= International recognition of Kosovo =

Map of states that have recognised Kosovo's independence (as of 19 December 2025) Kosovo States that have recognised Kosovo as independent States that have not recognised Kosovo as independent States that have recognised Kosovo and were later reported to have withdrawn recognition

International governments are divided on the issue of recognition of the independence of Kosovo from Serbia, which was declared in 2008. The Government of Serbia does not diplomatically recognise Kosovo as a sovereign state, although the two countries have enjoyed normalised economic relations since 2020 and have agreed not to try to interfere with the other's accession to the European Union.

As of 19 December 2025, at least 110 out of 193 (57%) United Nations member states, 22 out of 27 (81.5%) European Union member states, 28 out of 32 (87.5%) NATO member states and 37 out of 57 (64.9%) Organisation of Islamic Cooperation member states have recognised Kosovo. In total, Kosovo has received 110 diplomatic recognitions by UN member states, however conflicts have arisen regarding the exact number of countries recognising Kosovo. Kosovo claims that the number of countries recognising its independence is 120, whilst Serbia claims the number is 84, stating that some countries have withdrawn recognition. Third party sources give the number of recognising countries as around 110.

Among the G20 countries, eleven (including all seven G7 countries) have recognised Kosovo as an independent state: Australia, Canada, France, Germany, Italy, Japan, Saudi Arabia, South Korea, Turkey, the United Kingdom, and the United States. Eight (including all five founding BRICS countries), however, have not recognised Kosovo as an independent state: Argentina, Brazil, China, India, Indonesia, Mexico, Russia, and South Africa.

In 2013, the two sides began to normalise relations in accordance with the Brussels Agreement. In September 2020, Serbia and Kosovo agreed to normalise economic ties. Serbia also agreed to suspend its efforts to encourage other states to either not recognise Kosovo or to revoke recognition for one year, while Kosovo agreed to not apply for new membership of international organisations for the same period. In February 2023, Serbia and Kosovo agreed on a proposed normalisation agreement in European Union mediated dialogue and through further negotiations accepted a roadmap and timescale for its implementation the following month. Under the terms of the agreement, Serbia committed to not oppose the membership of Kosovo in international organisations and recognised Kosovo's national symbols and official documents, including passports, diplomas, vehicle registration plates, and customs stamps.

== Background ==
A number of states expressed concern over the unilateral character of Kosovo's declaration, or explicitly announced that they would not recognise an independent Kosovo. The United Nations Security Council (UNSC) remains divided on this issue: of its five members with veto power, three (France, the United Kingdom, and the United States) have recognised the declaration of independence, while the People's Republic of China has expressed concern, urging the continuation of the previous negotiation framework. The Russian Federation (which has close ties with Serbia) has rejected the declaration and considers it illegal, and does not recognise Kosovo's independence.

In May 2008, Russia, China, and India released a joint statement calling for new negotiations between Belgrade and Pristina.

Although EU member states individually decide whether to recognise Kosovo, by consensus the EU has commissioned the European Union Rule of Law Mission in Kosovo (EULEX) to ensure peace and continued external oversight. Due to the dispute in the United Nations Security Council (UNSC), the reconfiguration of the United Nations Interim Administration Mission in Kosovo (UNMIK) and partial handover to the EULEX mission met with difficulties. Despite Russian and Serbian protests, the UN Secretary-General Ban Ki-moon proceeded with the reconfiguration plan. On 15 July 2008, he stated: "In the light of the fact that the Security Council is unable to provide guidance, I have instructed my Special Representative to move forward with the reconfiguration of UNMIK ... in order to adapt UNMIK to a changed reality." According to the Secretary-General, the "United Nations has maintained a position of strict neutrality on the question of Kosovo's status". On 26 November 2008, the UNSC gave the green light to the deployment of the EULEX mission in Kosovo. The EU mission is to assume police, justice, and customs duties from the UN, while operating under the United Nations Security Council Resolution 1244 (UNSCR 1244) that first placed Kosovo under UN administration in 1999.

Recognition of Kosovo by UN member states over time (total members 193)

A United Nations General Assembly (UNGA) resolution adopted on 8 October 2008 backed the request of Serbia to seek an International Court of Justice advisory opinion on Kosovo's declaration of independence. On 22 July 2010, the ICJ ruled that the declaration of independence of Kosovo did not violate international law "because international law contains no prohibition on declarations of independence", and that its authors were not bound by the Constitutional Framework (promulgated by UNMIK) or by UNSCR 1244, that is addressed only to United Nations Member States and organs of the United Nations.

Within the EU, key supporters of Kosovo's statehood include France and Germany. The strongest opponents to Kosovo's statehood within the EU include Spain and Greece. The Spanish non-recognition of Kosovo is linked to the Spanish government's opposition to the Basque and Catalan independence movements, while the Greek non-recognition of Kosovo is linked to the Cyprus dispute and Greece's historic relationship to Serbia.

== Serbia's reaction ==
Due to Serbian claims that Kosovo is part of its sovereign territory, its initial reactions included recalling ambassadors from countries that recognised Kosovo for several months, indicting Kosovar leaders on charges of high treason, and litigating the case at the International Court of Justice (ICJ). Serbia also expelled ambassadors from countries that recognised Kosovo after the UNGA vote adopting Serbia's initiative to seek an ICJ advisory opinion.

In December 2012, as a result of European Union mediated negotiations on Kosovo's status, Serbian Prime Minister Ivica Dačić agreed to appoint a liaison officer to Kosovo. In March 2013, Dačić said that while his government would never recognise Kosovo's independence, "the Serbian president cannot go to Kosovo, nor the prime minister, nor ministers, nor the police or army. Serbs can only leave Kosovo. That's how much Kosovo is ours and what our constitution and laws mean there".

In April 2013, Kosovo and Serbia reached an agreement to normalise relations, and thereby allow both nations to eventually join the European Union. On 17 June 2013 Kosovo and Serbia exchanged liaison officers.

However, the process of normalisation stalled in November 2018, after which Kosovo imposed a 100 percent tax on importing Serbian goods. On 1 April 2020, Kosovo withdrew the tax.

In September 2020, under an agreement brokered by the United States, Serbia and Kosovo agreed to normalise economic ties. Serbia also agreed to suspend its efforts to encourage other states to either not recognise Kosovo or to revoke recognition for one year, while Kosovo agreed to not apply for new membership of international organisations for the same period.

In February 2023, Serbia and Kosovo agreed to a proposed normalisation agreement in European Union-mediated dialogue and, through further negotiations, accepted a roadmap and timescale for its implementation the following month. Under the terms of the agreement, Serbia committed to not oppose the membership of Kosovo in international organisations and recognised Kosovo's national symbols and official documents, including passports, diplomas, vehicle registration plates, and customs stamps.

In December 2023, the head of Serbia's office for Kosovo, Petar Petković, announced that the Serbian Government had decided to enable the free movement of all vehicles with Kosovo plates into Serbian territory, starting from 1 January 2024.

== International Court of Justice advisory opinion ==
On 27 March 2008, Serbian Foreign Minister Vuk Jeremić said Serbia would request the International Court of Justice to review the legality of Kosovo's declaration of independence. On 8 October 2008, the UN General Assembly adopted Serbia's resolution, with 77 votes in favour, 6 votes against and 74 abstentions. The court delivered its opinion on 22 July 2010; by a vote of 10 to 4, it held that "the adoption of the declaration of independence of 17 February 2008 did not violate general international law because international law contains no 'prohibition on declarations of independence', nor did the adoption of the declaration of independence violate UN Security Council Resolution 1244, since this did not describe Kosovo's final status, nor had the Security Council reserved for itself the decision on final status.

== Positions taken by UN member states and other entities ==
According to a 2020 study, states which have stronger ties to the United States are more likely to recognise Kosovo, whereas states with stronger ties to Russia are less likely to recognise Kosovo.

=== Countries which have recognised Kosovo as an independent state ===
==== Member states of the United Nations ====
Same-day recognitions are sorted alphabetically by default.

No.	Country	Date of recognition	Ref.	Diplomatic relations (Note: The information in this column is taken from Foreign relations of Kosovo.)	Relevant membership, further details
1	Costa Rica	17 February 2008		Yes	
2–8	Afghanistan	18 February 2008		Yes	IOC
2–8	Albania (Note: Albania recognized Kosovo as an independent state, initially on 22 October 1991, with the recognition on 18 February 2008 serving as a formal confirmation.)	18 February 2008		Yes	OIC, NATO; Albania–Kosovo relations
2–8	France	18 February 2008		Yes	EU, NATO; France–Kosovo relations
2–8	Senegal	18 February 2008		Yes	IOC
2–8	Turkey	18 February 2008		Yes	IOC, NATO; Kosovo–Turkey relations
2–8	United Kingdom	18 February 2008		Yes	NATO; Kosovo–United Kingdom relations
2–8	United States	18 February 2008		Yes	NATO, Kosovo–United States relations
9	Australia	19 February 2008		Yes	Australia–Kosovo relations
10–11	Latvia	20 February 2008		Yes	EU, NATO; Kosovo–Latvia relations
10–11	Germany	20 February 2008		Yes	EU, NATO; Germany–Kosovo relations
12–15	Estonia	21 February 2008		Yes	EU, NATO; Estonia–Kosovo relations
12–15	Italy	21 February 2008		Yes	EU, NATO; Italy–Kosovo relations
12–15	Denmark	21 February 2008		Yes	EU, NATO; Denmark–Kosovo relations
12–15	Luxembourg	21 February 2008		Yes	EU, NATO; Kosovo–Luxembourg relations
16	Peru	22 February 2008		No	Kosovo–Peru relations
17	Belgium	24 February 2008		Yes	EU, NATO; Belgium–Kosovo relations
18	Poland	26 February 2008		No	EU, NATO; Kosovo–Poland relations
19	Switzerland	27 February 2008		Yes	Kosovo–Switzerland relations
20	Austria	28 February 2008		Yes	EU; Austria–Kosovo relations
21	Ireland	29 February 2008		Yes	EU; Ireland–Kosovo relations
22	Sweden	4 March 2008		Yes	EU, NATO; Kosovo–Sweden relations
23	Netherlands	4 March 2008		Yes	EU, NATO; Kosovo–Netherlands relations
24	Iceland	5 March 2008		Yes	NATO; Iceland–Kosovo relations
25	Slovenia	5 March 2008		Yes	EU, NATO; Kosovo–Slovenia relations
26	Finland	7 March 2008		Yes	EU, NATO; Finland–Kosovo relations
27–28	Canada	18 March 2008		Yes	NATO; Canada–Kosovo relations
27–28	Japan	18 March 2008		Yes	Japan–Kosovo relations
29–31	Monaco	19 March 2008		Yes	
29–31	Hungary	19 March 2008		Yes	EU, NATO; Hungary–Kosovo relations
29–31	Croatia	19 March 2008		Yes	EU, NATO; Croatia–Kosovo relations
32	Bulgaria	20 March 2008		Yes	EU, NATO; Bulgaria–Kosovo relations
33	Liechtenstein	25 March 2008		Yes	
34–35	South Korea	28 March 2008		No	Kosovo–South Korea relations
34–35	Norway	28 March 2008		Yes	NATO; Kosovo–Norway relations
36	Marshall Islands	17 April 2008		Yes	
37	Burkina Faso	23 April 2008		Yes	OIC Further details In January 2023, Serbian President Aleksandar Vučić announced that Burkina Faso, amongst eight other nations, had withdrawn its recognition of Kosovo's independence. In December 2023, this claim was confirmed.
38	Lithuania	6 May 2008		Yes	EU, NATO; Kosovo–Lithuania relations
39	San Marino	12 May 2008		Yes	
40	Czech Republic	21 May 2008		Yes	EU, NATO; Czech Republic–Kosovo relations
41	Liberia	30 May 2008		Yes	Further details In June 2018, following a meeting between Liberian Foreign Minister Gbehzohngar Milton Findley and Serbian Foreign Minister Ivica Dačić, a note from the Ministry of Foreign Affairs of Liberia was published which stated in part that it "annuls its letter of recognition of Kosovo". A few days later, Liberia's MFA posted a notice on its website saying that it wished "to refute reports in some international and social media of its revocation of diplomatic relations with the Republic of Kosovo".
42	Sierra Leone	11 June 2008		Yes	OIC Further details Recognition was withdrawn on 2 March 2020. In April 2025, at the Antalya Diplomacy Forum 2025, the President of Kosovo, Vjosa Osmani, met with the president of Sierra Leone Julius Maada Bio. According to Osmani statement, both leaders expressed their commitment to strengthening bilateral relations and extended invitations to each other for official visits to Kosovo and Sierra Leone. According to Sierra Leone's government press statement, President Bio "affirmed Sierra Leone’s readiness to collaborate meaningfully with Kosovo, particularly in sectors such as trade, agriculture, education, health, and tourism".
43	Colombia	4 August 2008		Yes	Colombia–Kosovo relations
44	Belize	7 August 2008		Yes	
45	Malta	22 August 2008		Yes	EU
46	Samoa	15 September 2008		Yes	
47	Portugal	7 October 2008		Yes	EU, NATO; Kosovo–Portugal relations
48–49	Montenegro	9 October 2008		Yes	NATO; Kosovo–Montenegro relations
48–49	North Macedonia	9 October 2008		Yes	NATO; Kosovo–North Macedonia relations
50	United Arab Emirates	14 October 2008		Yes	OIC; Kosovo–United Arab Emirates relations
51	Malaysia	30 October 2008		Yes	OIC; Kosovo–Malaysia relations
52	Federated States of Micronesia	5 December 2008		Yes	
53	Panama	16 January 2009		Yes	
54	Maldives	19 February 2009		Yes	OIC; Kosovo–Maldives relations Further details In January 2023, Serbian President Aleksandar Vučić announced that the Maldives, amongst eight other nations, had withdrawn its recognition of Kosovo's independence. In May 2023, Maldives denied this claims. Maldives confirms recognition in February 2024 and February 2025 again.
55	Palau	6 March 2009		Yes	Recognition withdrawn 18 January 2019, resumed 20 October 2023. Kosovo–Palau relations
56	Gambia	7 April 2009		Yes	OIC
57	Saudi Arabia	20 April 2009		Yes	OIC; Kosovo–Saudi Arabia relations
58	Comoros	14 May 2009		Yes	OIC Further details Recognition withdrawn 1 November 2018. In February 2021, the former Minister of Foreign Affairs of Kosovo, Behgjet Pacolli, posted on the social network Facebook a letter from the Minister of Foreign Affairs of the Comoros. He commented that "I have received a letter from the Comorian Minister of Foreign Affairs assuring me that the recognition once established between us remains intact and sound, just as it was when it was first achieved". However, the letter states that "the Comorian authorities have taken note of Kosovo’s request to establish diplomatic relations with the Union of the Comoros. The Ministry expresses its goodwill and readiness to engage in discussions with the authorities of Kosovo within the time frame agreed upon by both parties". Diplomatic relations, however, had already been established in 2015.
59	Bahrain	19 May 2009		Yes	OIC
60	Jordan	7 July 2009		Yes	OIC; Jordan–Kosovo relations
61	Dominican Republic	10 July 2009		Yes	
62	New Zealand	9 November 2009		Yes	Kosovo–New Zealand relations
63	Malawi	14 December 2009		Yes	
64	Mauritania	12 January 2010		Yes	OIC
65	Eswatini	12 April 2010		No	Further details In January 2023, Serbian President Aleksandar Vučić announced that Eswatini, amongst eight other nations, had withdrawn its recognition of Kosovo's independence. In the same month, Kosovo's Ambassador to the United Kingdom, Ilir Kapiti, met with Eswatini’s High Commissioner Thandazile P. Mbuyisa. According to Kapiti’s post, they "are looking forward to strengthening relations Eswatini-Kosovo by exploring economic opportunities". In May 2023, State Secretary at the Ministry of Defence Nemanja Starović met Ambassador of the Kingdom of Eswatini, Sibusisive Mngomezulu. According to MD Serbia during meeting Starović expressed "his gratitude to Eswatini for withdrawing the recognition of unilaterally declared independence of Kosovo, and for the support for the territorial integrity and sovereignty of Serbia". In September 2025, Minister of Defence Bratislav Gašić met with Prince Sicalo Nkopolo Dlamini, Principal Secretary of the Ministry of National Defence and Security of the Kingdom of Eswatini. During the meeting, Gašić expressed "his gratitude for Eswatini’s support for Serbia’s territorial integrity and sovereignty, particularly in light of Eswatini’s decision to withdraw its recognition of independence of Kosovo".
66	Vanuatu	28 April 2010		Yes	
67	Djibouti	8 May 2010		Yes	OIC
68	Somalia	19 May 2010		Yes	OIC Further details In January 2023, Serbian President Aleksandar Vučić announced that Somalia, amongst eight other nations, had withdrawn its recognition of Kosovo's independence. During the same month, the Embassy of Kosovo in Turkey reported that Kosovan Ambassador Agon Vrenezi met with his Somali counterpart Jama A. Mohamed, stating that they had "discussed the possibilities of deepening cooperation between the two countries". In March 2023, Kosovo's president Vjosa Osmani met Abshir Omar Huruse, the foreign minister of Somalia. According to Osmani's statement, both sides "reaffirmed our excellent bilateral relations". In November 2024, during a joint press conference with Somalia’s Minister of Internal Security, Abdullahi Sheikh Ismail, Serbian Interior Minister Ivica Dačić reiterated that Somalia had revoked its recognition of Kosovo, expressing gratitude for Somalia’s respect for Serbia’s territorial integrity. According to the Tanjug news agency, in March 2025 Serbian Foreign Minister Marko Đurić held a telephone conversation with Somali Foreign Minister Ahmed Moalim Fiqi, thanking Somalia for supporting Serbia’s sovereignty and territorial integrity. Đurić emphasised that "Serbia highly appreciates Somalia’s support regarding the autonomous province of Kosovo and Metohija". In September 2025, it was claimed that Somalia had rejected recognition of Kosovo. On 17 February 2026, Somalia’s President sent a letter to Kosovo’s President congratulating the Republic of Kosovo on the 18th anniversary of its independence confirming that Somalia continues to recognise Kosovo's independence.
69	Honduras	3 September 2010		Yes	
70	Kiribati	21 October 2010		No	
71	Tuvalu	18 November 2010		Yes	
72	Qatar	7 January 2011		Yes	OIC; Kosovo–Qatar relations
73	Guinea-Bissau	10 January 2011		Yes	OIC; Recognition withdrawn 21 November 2017, withdrawal was annulled 2 February 2018.
74	Oman	4 February 2011		Yes	OIC; Kosovo–Oman relations Further details There are conflicting reports on whether Oman has recognised Kosovo or not. On 4 February 2011, the MFA of Kosovo announced that it received a note from Oman which stated that it "will welcome Kosovo's membership to the United Nations, as well as to other international and regional organizations" and commented on it by the foreign minister Vlora Çitaku as recognition of independence and the establishment of diplomatic relations. However, in September 2011 new Kosovo's deputy Foreign Minister Petrit Selimi accepted that it had misread this as recognition and posted that "Oman had never recognized as Vlora (Çitaku) clarified in a statement in Feb. They sent warm letter of wishing us to enter UN". In the same month Serbia's Foreign Minister Vuk Jeremić announced that Oman never recognised Kosovo. He said that "a note from Oman has informed us that Oman’s position on Kosovo has not changed". Later that month, Kosovo's MFA announced that Oman's Foreign Minister Yusuf bin Alawi bin Abdullah had informed them of his country's recognition of Kosovo. But even this statement has been cast into doubt. In February 2012, Rexhep Boja, the chargé d’affaires at the Kosovo embassy in Saudi Arabia, stated that "five GCC states, including Saudi Arabia, have recognized our independence", adding that "Kosovo is still waiting for Oman to recognize it". In September 2020, Kosovo’s Foreign Minister Meliza Haradinaj-Stublla held a videoconference with her Omani counterpart, Sayyid Badr bin Hamad bin Hamood Al Busaidi. According to the MFA of Kosovo, Haradinaj-Stublla discussed with Al Busaidi "the need to deepen relations between Kosovo and Oman". But press release also confirms that "the Republic of Kosovo and Oman have not yet established diplomatic relations". Then, three official meetings took place here between representatives of Kosovo and Oman, as reported by the Omani Ministry of Foreign Affairs. In September 2021, Kosovo’s President Vjosa Osmani and Foreign Minister Donika Gërvalla-Schwarz held a videoconference with her Omani counterpart, Sayyid Badr Albusaidi. During the meeting, the two sides "stressed the importance of working continuously to expand and diversify common interests in various fields". Omani MFA referred to Osmani and Gërvalla-Schwarz as the president and FM of the "Republic of Kosovo". In March 2024, Kosovo’s Foreign Minister Donika Gërvalla-Schwarz met with Mohammed bin Awadh Alhassan, Oman’s Permanent Representative to the United Nations in New York. Gërvalla-Schwarz called for "strengthening the bonds of cooperation and friendship between Oman and Kosovo". In September 2025, Kosovo’s Prime Minister Albin Kurti met with Omani Foreign Minister Sayyid Badr Albusaidi in New York. Kurti expressed his country’s "interest in benefiting from Oman’s experience and in strengthening practical cooperation in the fields of education, tourism, and investment". The issues of Kosovo’s recognition and the establishment of diplomatic relations were not mentioned in the press releases.
75	Andorra	8 June 2011		Yes	
76	Guinea	12 August 2011		Yes	OIC Further details In January 2023, Serbian President Aleksandar Vučić announced that Guinea, amongst eight other nations, had withdrawn its recognition of Kosovo's independence.
77	Niger	15 August 2011		Yes	OIC
78	Benin	18 August 2011		No	OIC
79	Saint Lucia	19 August 2011		Yes	Further details In January 2023, Serbian President Aleksandar Vučić announced that Saint Lucia, amongst eight other nations, had withdrawn its recognition of Kosovo's independence. In December 2023, Alva Baptiste, Foreign Minister of Saint Lucia, met in Belgrade with Serbian Foreign Minister Ivica Dačić. Dačić told, that "we especially thank St. Lucia for its decision to withdraw its recognition of Kosovo". In June 2025 Alva Baptiste met with Serbian new Foreign Minister Marko Đurić. Đurić extended his gratitude to Saint Lucia for its support for the territorial integrity and sovereignty of Serbia, underscoring that such a position reaffirms the country’s commitment to the core principles of international law and the United Nations Charter“.
80	Gabon	15 September 2011		Yes	OIC Further details In January 2023, Serbian President Aleksandar Vučić announced that Gabon, amongst eight other nations, had withdrawn its recognition of Kosovo's independence. In the same month, the Kosovan Ambassador to Canada, Adriatik Kryeziu, met with his counterpart from Gabon, Engone Rosine Epouse Oliveira. According to Kryeziu’s post they had "discussion on Kosovo-Gabon current bilateral relations and future cooperation". In April 2023, during an official visit by the Gabonese Foreign Minister Yolande Nyonda, Serbian Defence Minister Miloš Vučević expressed his gratitude to Gabon for withdrawing its recognition of Kosovo's independence. In May 2024, a Gabonese government delegation paid an official visit to Serbia. According to the Ministry of Defence of Serbia, during the meeting between the defence ministers of Serbia and Gabon, Serbian Minister Bratislav Gašić thanked Gabon for "supporting the territorial integrity and sovereignty of Serbia, as well as for withdrawing its recognition of the unilaterally declared independence of the so-called Kosovo". Furthermore, after a meeting between the Prime Ministers of Serbia, Miloš Vučević, and Gabon, Raymond Ndong Sima, it was stated at their joint press conference that Gabon had previously recognised Kosovo but now recognises the territorial integrity of Serbia.
81	Ivory Coast	16 September 2011		Yes	OIC
82	Kuwait	11 October 2011		Yes	OIC
83	Ghana	23 January 2012		Yes	Ghana–Kosovo relations Further details Recognition was withdrawn on 7 November 2019. The 2022 Kosovo Diplomatic List in 2022 still stated that the Ghanaian embassy in Ankara, Turkey is accredited to the Republic of Kosovo with the Ghanaian ambassador in Ankara being described as "Ambassador Extraordinary and Plenipotentiary – Non resident in Pristina". In April 2025, secretary of the former President of Kosovo Behgjet Pacolli, Jetlir Zyberaj, met the President of Ghana John Mahama. According to Zyberaj’s post president Mahama "confirmed his country's position that the recognition of Kosovo’s independence is in line with the values represented by Ghana and that the reports previously released by the Serbian state about its withdrawal are untrue". In July 2025, during his official three-day visit to Ghana, Serbia’s Foreign Minister Marko Đurić met with his Ghana’s counterpart, Samuel Okudzeto Ablakwa, with the President John Mahama, the Speaker of Parliament, and the Minister of Defence. Đurić expressed "deep appreciation for Ghana’s consistent support of Serbia’s territorial integrity and sovereignty, emphasizing the principled stance Ghana maintains on this matter". In September 2025, Albanian President of Kosovo Bajram Begaj met President of Ghana John Mahama. According to Bajram Begaj’s post he "met with Ghana’s President Mahama to discuss advancing our bilateral and multilateral cooperation, and confirming Ghana’s recognition for Kosova".
84	Haiti	10 February 2012		No	
85	Brunei	25 April 2012		Yes	OIC
86	Chad	1 June 2012		Yes	OIC
87	Timor-Leste	20 September 2012		Yes	Kosovo–Timor-Leste relations
88	Fiji	19 November 2012		Yes	
89	Saint Kitts and Nevis	28 November 2012		Yes	
90	Pakistan	24 December 2012		Yes	OIC; Kosovo–Pakistan relations
91	Tanzania	29 May 2013		Yes	
92	Guyana	13 June 2013		Yes	OIC
93	Yemen	11 June 2013		Yes	OIC
94	Egypt	26 June 2013		No	OIC; Egypt–Kosovo relations
95	Thailand	24 September 2013		Yes	Kosovo–Thailand relations
96	Grenada	25 September 2013		Yes	Further details Recognition has been officially suspended 30 October 2018. In March 2019, Serbia's Foreign Minister Ivica Dačić met with his Grenadian counterpart Charles Peter David. According to MFA Serbia, Minister David declared after meeting that "Grenada firmly stands by its decision to withdraw the recognition of Kosovo’s independence and wishes to wait for the outcome of the dialogue". In September 2023, Kosovan president Vjosa Osmani met Grenada's Prime Minister Dickon Mitchell. According to Office of the Prime Minister of Grenada’s post, they "discussed fostering strong diplomatic ties, exploring tourism opportunities & other avenues for collaboration" and referred to Osmani as the president of the "Republic of Kosovo". In June 2025 Serbia's Foreign Minister Marko Đurić meet with his Grenada's counterpart Joseph Andall. During meeting, according to MFA Serbia, Djuric reiterated "Serbia’s appreciation for Grenada’s stance on the issue of the unilaterally declared independence of Kosovo", emphasising that "through its consistent position, Grenada has demonstrated a firm commitment to the core principles of international law and the Charter of the United Nations".
97	Libya	25 September 2013		Yes	OIC; Kosovo–Libya relations Further details In January 2023, Serbian President Aleksandar Vučić announced that Libya, amongst eight other nations, had withdrawn its recognition of Kosovo's independence. In the same month, Kosovo's Ambassador to Belgium, Agron Bajrami, met with the Libyan Ambassador to Belgium, Amel Jerary. According to Bajrami’s post, they "agreed about need for deepening Kosovo-Libya relations".
98	Tonga	20 January 2014		Yes	
99	Lesotho	11 February 2014		No	Further details Recognition withdrawn 16 October 2018. A few days later, according to gazetametro.net, Lesotho Prime Minister, Motsoahae Thomas Thabane, when asked by the Presheva Jone news agency about the withdrawal of his country's recognition of Kosovo, said that "I hear it now. Regardless of who wrote it or said it, this is not valid. We have recognized the status of Kosovo and we do not intend to change this position, on the contrary, we will expand cooperation between the two countries". In December 2023, Kosovan president Vjosa Osmani met King Letsie III and Queen 'Masenate Mohato Seeiso of Lesotho. According to Osmani’s post they "are committed to deepening relations between our countries, as well as to work together to address common global challenges".
100	El Salvador	18 October 2014		Yes	
101	Antigua and Barbuda	20 May 2015		Yes	Further details In January 2023, Serbian President Aleksandar Vučić announced that Antigua and Burbuda, amongst eight other nations, has withdrawn its recognition of Kosovo's independence. In June 2025, the Governor General of Antigua and Barbuda Rodney Williams made an official visit to and met with president Vjosa Osmani. According to Osmani’s post she "expressed deep gratitude for the recognition his country gave to Kosovo in 2015, an act that strengthened our international position and demonstrated principled support for our statehood". In the same month, Serbian Foreign Minister Marko Đurić held a bilateral meeting with the Minister of Foreign Affairs of Antigua and Barbuda, Paul Chet Greene. According to MFA of Serbia, Djuric "expressed special gratitude to Antigua and Barbuda for its decision to withdraw recognition of the unilaterally declared independence of the so-called Kosovo".
102	Suriname	8 July 2016		No	OIC; Kosovo–Suriname relations Further details Recognition withdrawn 27 October 2017. In June 2022, Kosovo's Foreign Minister Donika Gërvalla-Schwarz met with her Surinamese counterpart Albert Ramdin. According to the MFA of Kosovo's posts, they talked about enhancing the co-operation between the two countries. In July 2023, a delegation led by Albert Ramdin, paid an official visit to Serbia. It was confirmed that Suriname "recognized the territorial integrity of Serbia, thereby demonstrating its respect for the fundamental principles of international law". The President of the National Assembly of Serbia, Vladimir Orlić, met Albert Ramdin, and thanked him for his country’s decision to withdraw its recognition of Kosovo in 2017. According to Kosovo Online, during his meeting with Albert Ramdin, Serbian President Aleksandar Vučić emphasised that "Serbia highly values Suriname for its decision to revoke the recognition of Kosovo’s independence".
103	Singapore	1 December 2016		Yes	Kosovo–Singapore relations
104	Bangladesh	27 February 2017		Yes	OIC; Bangladesh–Kosovo relations
105	Barbados	15 February 2018		Yes	
106	Israel	4 September 2020		Yes	Israel–Kosovo relations
107	Kenya	26 March 2025		No	Kenya–Kosovo relations
108	Sudan	12 April 2025		No	OIC; Kosovo–Sudan relations
109	Syria	29 October 2025		No	OIC; Kosovo–Syria relations
110	Bahamas	19 December 2025		Yes	The Bahamas–Kosovo relations

==== Non-UN countries ====
No.	Country	Date of recognition	Ref.	Diplomatic relations	Relevant membership, further details
1	Republic of China (Taiwan)	19 February 2008		No	Kosovo–Taiwan relations
2	Cook Islands	18 May 2015		Yes	
3	Niue	23 June 2015		Yes	

=== Countries which have recognised Kosovo but have subsequently been reported to have withdrawn recognition ===
Some countries have recognised Kosovo, but later have been reported to have withdrawn their recognition. These are:

No.	Country	Date of		Ref.	Relevant membership, further details
No.	Country	Recognition	Withdrawal	Ref.	Relevant membership, further details
1	Burundi	16 October 2012	15 February 2018		
2	Papua New Guinea	3 October 2012	5 July 2018		
3	Dominica	11 December 2012	2 November 2018		
4	Solomon Islands	13 August 2014	28 November 2018		
5	Madagascar	24 November 2017	7 December 2018		
6	Togo	11 July 2014	28 June 2019		OIC Further details 16 January 2023, Togo confirmed its withdrawal of recognition of Kosovo.
7	Central African Republic	22 July 2011	24 July 2019		
8	Nauru	23 April 2008	13 November 2019		

The Serbian Foreign Ministry claimed in March 2020 that a total of 18 countries had withdrawn their recognition: aside from the 8 listed above, Serbia also mentioned: Grenada, Guinea-Bissau, Liberia, Palau, São Tomé and Príncipe, and Suriname. In some of those cases, Kosovo's foreign ministry has called it "fake news" and "Serbian propaganda".

=== Countries which have not recognised Kosovo as an independent state ===
Diplomatic recognition is an explicit, official, unilateral act in the foreign policy of states regarding another party. Not having issued such a statement does not necessarily mean the state has objections to the existence, independence, sovereignty, or government of the other party. Some states, by custom or policy, do not extend formal recognition on the grounds that a vote for membership in the UN or another organisation whose membership is limited to states is itself an act of recognition.

==== Member states of the United Nations ====
===== A =====
Country	Position
Algeria	Main article: Algeria–Kosovo relations In March 2008, Mourad Medelci, Algerian Foreign Minister, stated that while Algeria sympathised with all Muslim countries, it believed that international laws had to be adhered to. A year later, Medelci reaffirmed the Algerian position of Kosovo being an integral part of Serbia.
Angola	On 23 June 2008, Angolan president José Eduardo dos Santos sent a message to his Serbian counterpart, Boris Tadić, regarding Kosovo's declaration of independence. It reiterated the solidarity of dos Santos and Angola with Serbia in regard to the preservation of its sovereignty and integrity.
Argentina	Main article: Argentina–Kosovo relations In February 2008, Argentine Foreign Minister, Jorge Taiana said "if we were to recognize Kosovo, which has declared its independence unilaterally, without an agreement with Serbia, we would set a dangerous precedent that would seriously threaten our chances of a political settlement in the case of the Falkland Islands". He said that Argentina will not recognise it because it "supports the principle of territorial integrity", and he stressed that UNSCR 1244 called for the mutual agreement of both parties to solve the dispute. At the International Court of Justice, the Argentine delegation argued that Kosovo's declaration of independence "breaches the obligation to respect the territorial integrity of Serbia, the obligation of peaceful settlement of disputes and the principle of non-intervention", and that any solution "did not, and could not, abolish Serbia's sovereignty over Kosovo".
Armenia	Main article: Armenia's reaction to the 2008 Kosovo declaration of independence On 12 March 2008, Armenian president Serzh Sargsyan stated that Armenia's possible recognition of Kosovo's independence would not strain Armenia–Russia relations, but also noted that "Kosovo recognition issue needs serious discussion ... Armenia has always been an adherent to the right of nations to self-determination and in this aspect we welcome Kosovo's independence", but in September 2008 Sargsyan stated that Armenia had not recognised Kosovo's independence because "Armenia can not recognize another entity in the same situation as long as it has not recognized the Nagorno-Karabakh Republic". On 4 April 2011 Sargsyan said that Armenia would not recognise the independence of Kosovo against Serbia's interests. On 20 December 2024, Armenia recognised Kosovo passports as valid travel documents, allowing Kosovo nationals to visit to the country. On 3 May 2026, Kosovo's acting Prime Minister Albin Kurti visited Armenia and met with Prime Minister Nikol Pashinyan, discussing bilateral co-operation.
Azerbaijan	Main article: Azerbaijan–Kosovo relations In February 2008, a spokesman of the Foreign Ministry of Azerbaijan, Khazar Ibrahim, said "We view this illegal act as being in contradiction with international law. Proceeding from this, Azerbaijan's position was clear: it does not recognise [Kosovo's] independence". Azerbaijan has also withdrawn peacekeepers from Kosovo. In 2009, Azerbaijan said, regarding Kosovo, that entities that declare secession while violating the internal laws of the state can not be considered to be states, and that a fait accompli may not be accepted. In May 2010, President of Azerbaijan Ilham Aliyev stated that the proclaimed independence of Kosovo was unilateral and an illegal move.

===== B =====
Country	Position
Belarus	Main article: Belarus–Kosovo relations In February 2008, Belarusian President Alexander Lukashenko wrote in a letter to Serbian President Boris Tadić that "Belarus expresses its solidarity with the Serbians' intention to defend their sovereignty and territorial integrity". The National Assembly of Belarus had issued a statement condemning the declaration of independence and encouraged all nations to call the move "illegal" under international law.
Bhutan	On 19 September 2012, the representative of Bhutan to the UN, Lhatu Wangchuk, said that his country was deliberating the issue of Kosovo.
Bolivia	Main article: Bolivia–Kosovo relations In February 2008, Bolivian president Evo Morales refused to recognise Kosovo's independence and compared Kosovo separatists to the leaders of four eastern Bolivian states who had demanded greater autonomy from the national government. In a 4 December 2009 hearing at the ICJ, the Bolivian delegation said that Kosovo was an integral part of Serbia, that the Republic of Kosovo did not exist, and that a "unilateral declaration of independence cannot change the international regime established by the UNSC resolution, or decide the outcome of negotiations".
Bosnia and Herzegovina	Main article: Bosnia and Herzegovina–Kosovo relations Bosnia and Herzegovina's reaction to Kosovo's independence has been mixed. Bosniak and Croat members of the Presidency want to recognise it, but Serb members refuse to do so, citing the possibility of secession of Bosnia's Republika Srpska on the same grounds of national self-determination (the Kosovo precedent).
Botswana	In October 2010, Botswana's foreign minister Phandu Skelemani said that Botswana had not yet made a decision on recognition of Kosovo pending a ruling of the European Union, and that Kosovo had promised support in the establishment of a medical school in return for its recognition.
Brazil	Main article: Brazil–Kosovo relations Brazil has not recognised the independence of Kosovo, stating that any change should be reached under the auspices of the United Nations and the legal framework of UNSCR 1244.

===== C =====
Country	Position
Cambodia	On 6 October 2008, the Europe Department Director at the Ministry of Foreign Affairs and International Cooperation of Cambodia, Kao Samreth, stressed that Cambodia does not wish to encourage secession in any country and therefore does not support the independence of Kosovo. Kao drew parallels to independence claims for South Ossetia and stated that Cambodia would not encourage tension within a country by supporting independence claims. In February 2009, Secretary of State at Ministry of Foreign Affairs and International Cooperation of Cambodia, Ouch Borith, reiterated an earlier Cambodian Ministry of Foreign Affairs statement that Kosovo was a sensitive issue which they are studying carefully. Borith questioned, "if Kosovo is recognized, what about South Ossetia?" In April 2009, it was stated that Cambodia had no plans to file a brief (either supportive of Serbia or Kosovo) in the ICJ case.
Cameroon	Main article: Cameroon–Kosovo relations In January 2011, the General Secretary of Cameroon's Ministry of Foreign Affairs, Ferdinand Ngoh Ngoh, reportedly said that his government could not deny that Kosovo's independence was irreversible, but that it would have to be careful on how to proceed in order not to create a situation that would damage Cameroon's interests and position in the world. In 2018, Cameroon was one of 51 countries to vote against Kosovo's bid to joint Interpol, effectively blocking it from becoming a member country of the organisation.
Cape Verde	In December 2010, Cape Verde's National Director of Political Affairs and Co-operation, José Luis Rocha, said that his country would wait until there was consensus at the United Nations Security Council before considering its position.
Chile	In a 27 February 2008 press release, the Foreign Ministry of Chile called on the parties concerned to achieve, by peaceable means, through dialogue and adherence to the international law, a solution that respects the principles and purposes of the United Nations Charter. Chile has declared that it would continue to analyse the discussions that have taken place both in the United Nations Security Council and in the Council of Ministers of the European Union.
China	Main article: China's reaction to the 2008 Kosovo declaration of independence The People's Republic of China supports Serbia's position on Kosovo, seeing parallels to its own claim over Taiwan.
DR Congo	Main article: Democratic Republic of the Congo–Kosovo relations
Congo Republic	
Cuba	Main article: Cuba–Kosovo relations On 29 February 2008, writing in his personal "Reflections of Fidel" column, which was published in the official newspaper of the Communist Party of Cuba, Granma Internacional, Fidel Castro accused Javier Solana of being the ideological father of Kosovo's "independence" (Castro's quotes) and, by doing so, of putting at risk the ethnic cohesion and the very state integrity of Spain or the UK, both of which experienced separatist movements of their own.
Cyprus	Main article: Cyprus–Kosovo relations On 11 February 2008, the Cypriot Foreign Minister Erato Kozakou-Marcoullis, stated that "Cyprus will never recognize a unilateral declaration of independence outside the U.N. framework, and in particular by side-stepping the role of the Security Council". This stance was reiterated in October 2009 by the President of Cyprus Dimitris Christofias, who said Cyprus would not recognise Kosovo, even if all other EU members did so. Cyprus recognises travel documents issued by Kosovo.

===== E =====
Country	Position
Ecuador	Main article: Ecuador–Kosovo relations In response to a request from the University of Oxford regarding the analysis of developments related to the independence of Kosovo, in August 2008 the Ecuadorian Foreign Ministry stated that there should be "unrestricted compliance with the rules and principles of the United Nations Charter and International Law".
Equatorial Guinea	On 1 September 2010, Equatorial Guinea's Permanent Representative to the UN, Anatolio Ndong Mba, said during a press conference that his country's foreign policy favours Kosovo's independence. In September 2011, the President of Equatorial Guinea, Teodoro Obiang Nguema Mbasogo, is reported to have responded positively to a request for recognition by Kosovo. During a visit of Teodoro Nguema Obiang Mangue to Belgrade on 8 June 2022, it was stated that Equatorial Guinea has not changed its position about not recognising Kosovo.
Eritrea	On 4 September 2008, the Director of the Euro-Americas Division at the Eritrean Ministry of Foreign Affairs, Tsehaye Fassil, said that his Government had not decided whether it would recognise Kosovo's independence.
Ethiopia	Main article: Ethiopia–Kosovo relations In January 2009, Ethiopia's Ambassador to Austria reportedly stated that the Ethiopian government would decide on the recognition of Kosovo "at the right time". According to Serbia, Skënder Hyseni, Kosovo's Foreign Minister, and other members of his delegation were denied entry into Ethiopia in January 2010. They allegedly wanted to attend an African Union summit in order to lobby African nations to recognise Kosovo. The Serbian Foreign Minister, Vuk Jeremić, said that their visas were denied after pressure from the Serbian government. Jeremić, who attended the summit, thanked his Ethiopian counterpart for denying the visas and supporting Serbia's cause. However, Kosovo's Foreign Ministry denies that they submitted any requests for visas. In December 2014, amid a diplomatic dispute with Serbia, Ethiopia threatened to recognise Kosovo.

===== G =====
Country	Position
Georgia	Main article: Georgia–Kosovo relations The Foreign Minister of Georgia, David Bakradze, said on 18 February 2008 that Tbilisi would not recognise Kosovo's independence. On 29 March 2008 the prime minister, Lado Gurgenidze, gave a recorded interview in Estonia, in which he clearly said in English that as Georgia's friends have recognised Kosovo, it was only natural that eventually Georgia would do likewise. The printed publication of the interview elicited demands by the opposition to impeach him, and the government spokesman stated that the prime minister had been misinterpreted, after which the Estonian paper Postimees, which conducted and printed the interview, released the audio publicly.
Greece	Main article: Greece's reaction to the 2008 Kosovo declaration of independence As of 2022, Greece does not recognise the independence of Kosovo. In 2018, Greece was one of 51 countries that voted against Kosovo's bid to join Interpol. Greece recognises travel documents issued by Kosovo.
Guatemala	Main article: Guatemala–Kosovo relations In March 2008, the Guatemalan Foreign Minister, Haroldo Rodas, had said that he had objected to the recognition of Kosovo in deference to Russian concerns. At a meeting on 26 March 2009 with Kosovo's Foreign Minister, Skënder Hyseni, the Ambassador of Guatemala to the UN, Gert Rosenthal, said that his country's government was carefully studying the developments in Kosovo, and the ongoing preparations to present a case to the ICJ. He also said that Guatemala was working with others in Latin America to reach a decision.

===== I =====
Country	Position
India	Main articles: India–Kosovo relations and India's reaction to the 2008 Kosovo declaration of independence India has consistently refused to recognise the independence of Kosovo. An India-Kosovo Commercial Economic Office was opened in New Delhi in 2022.
Indonesia	Main article: Indonesia's reaction to the 2008 Kosovo declaration of independence Indonesia's reaction to Kosovo's independence has been mixed. In 2018, Indonesia was one of 51 countries that voted against Kosovo's bid to join Interpol.
Iran	Main article: Iran–Kosovo relations On 13 March 2008, Iranian president Mahmoud Ahmadinejad said that Iran, after considering the region's issues and conditions, had not recognised the independence of Kosovo.
Iraq	Main article: Iraq–Kosovo relations At a meeting on 28 May 2009 with Kosovo's Foreign Minister, Skënder Hyseni, the representative of Iraq to the UN, Hamid Al Bayati, reportedly said that Kosovo deserves to be recognised by other states and that Iraq's decision to recognise would come at a suitable time.

===== J =====
Country	Position
Jamaica	Main article: Jamaica–Kosovo relations The Jamaican Government in 2009 refused a request from the United States to recognise Kosovo. On 23 July 2009, the Under Secretary for Multilateral Affairs at the Jamaican Ministry of Foreign Affairs and Foreign Trade, Ambassador Vilma McNish, indicated that she expected no change in the government of Jamaica's decision not to extend formal diplomatic recognition to Kosovo. Following April 2010 meetings with Jamaican officials, Serbian Foreign Minister Vuk Jeremić stated that Serbia could count on Jamaica's continued support in the "preservation of its sovereignty and territorial integrity". On 20 February 2020, the president of Kosovo, Hashim Thaçi, stated on Twitter thanking Jamaica for recognising Kosovo as a sovereign and independent country. However, this was denied by Jamaica's Minister of Foreign Affairs and Foreign Trade Kamina Johnson-Smith the same day.

===== K =====
Country	Position
Kazakhstan	Kazakhstan has opposed the independence of Kosovo and has taken Serbia's position on the issue. In December 2008, Kazakh Prime Minister Karim Masimov stated that "We have an official position. Kazakhstan did not recognise Kosovo and does not recognise Abkhazia and South Ossetia. We consider that borders are defined and Kazakhstan will not recognise any new states". In 2022, during a public discussion at the St. Petersburg International Economic Forum, Kazakh president Kassym-Jomart Tokayev, while stating that Kazakhstan would not recognise the independence of breakaway states of Donetsk and Luhansk People's Republics in Eastern Ukraine, also stated that Kazakhstan will also not recognise the independence of Kosovo and other states with limited recognition, claiming that "if the right to self-determination is put into practice all over the world, then there would be chaos."
North Korea	In March 2017, North Korean Ambassador Ri Pyong Du visited Belgrade and affirmed North Korean support for Serbia's territorial integrity.
Kyrgyzstan	In February 2008, a statement issued by Kyrgyz Foreign Ministry stated that Kyrgyzstan would not recognise Kosovo's independence and considered it a dangerous precedent for separatist organisations in the world.

===== L =====
Country	Position
Laos	On 27 February 2008, the Lao Foreign Ministry issued a statement saying that "The Lao PDR urged all sides to respect the resolution of the UN Security Council No 1244, dated 10 June 1999, recognizing Kosovo as a Serbian province".
Lebanon	Main article: Kosovo–Lebanon relations On 29 November 2018, Lebanese Foreign Minister Gebran Bassil visited Belgrade and affirmed in a joint press conference with his Serbian counterpart, Ivica Dačić, that Lebanon supported "the sovereignty and territorial integrity" of Serbia.

===== M =====
Country	Position
Mali	Main article: Kosovo–Mali relations Following the August 2012 publication of a note verbale recognising Kosovo's independence, purportedly signed by acting President of Mali, Dioncounda Traoré, state run media in Mali issued a statement in which the Presidency of Mali denied recognising Kosovo and claimed that the document was a fabrication. Pacolli claimed that the Malian Army, who had recently seized control of the state in a coup d'état due to dissatisfaction over the government's handling of their own separatist uprising in Azawad, had intervened to reverse the recognition granted by the civilian president. On Pacolli's return to Mali to seek clarification on the issue, state leaders promised to reconfirm their recognition.
Mauritius	On 8 May 2008, Mauritian Secretary General for Foreign Affairs, Anand Neewoor, stated that the Government of Mauritius would not recognise Kosovo any time soon because of their concerns that it would have implications for their "fight to regain the Chagos Islands". In June 2009, the Mauritian prime minister, Navin Ramgoolam reportedly called the US embassy in Port Louis to say that he had decided that Mauritius would recognise Kosovo, despite opposition from his foreign ministry. However, the recognition did not take place.
Mexico	On 19 February 2008, the Mexican Secretariat of Foreign Affairs issued a statement saying that Mexico was closely paying attention to the situation as it develops in order to adopt, at an opportune moment, a position on the declaration of independence. The same statement called on all parties to agree peacefully, through dialogue, on the final status of Kosovo and to reach an agreement on the rights of minorities and the maintenance of peace and security in the Balkans. Mexican government officials have since then said that Mexico does not intend to recognise Kosovo.
Moldova	Kosovo's declaration creates "deep concerns in the Republic of Moldova," the Moldovan government said in a February 2008 statement, and that Moldova would not recognise Kosovo's independence. In December 2013, Moldovan Defence Minister Vitalie Marinuța stated on a visit to Serbia that Moldova will not recognise Kosovo. In the lead up to the 2nd summit of the European Political Community which Moldova is to host on 1 June 2023, legislation has been progressed in the Moldovan parliament that if enacted will recognise Kosovar passports as valid travel documents allowing holders to apply for electronic visas to enter Moldova.
Mongolia	Main article: Kosovo–Mongolia relations On 8 May 2009, Kosovo's president Fatmir Sejdiu met Nyamaa Enkhbold, the Mongolian Deputy Parliament Speaker, to request recognition of Kosovo by Mongolia. Enkhbold reportedly promised to deal with the request once he had returned home. In a 17 July 2012 meeting with Kosovo's deputy prime minister, Edita Tahiri, both the Mongolian president and the Minister of Foreign Affairs and Trade, Tsakhiagiin Elbegdorj and Gombojav Zandanshatar, said that Mongolia would consider recognising the independence of Kosovo.
Morocco	Main article: Kosovo–Morocco relations In June 2011, Moroccan government representatives explained that they had difficulty in recognising Kosovo due to the political context of Western Sahara.
Mozambique	Main article: Kosovo–Mozambique relations In February 2008, Mozambican Deputy Foreign Minister Henrique Banze said in reference to Kosovo's declaration of independence, "We shall wait for the appropriate moment. It's a very sensitive matter and like all matters of this kind, it demands a lot of thought. Our government will work so that it may make the most appropriate decision in this case". In September 2012, Mozambique's Minister for Foreign Affairs and Co-Operation, Oldemiro Julio Marques Baloi, said that his government would reconsider recognising Kosovo. In February 2025, President of Kosovo, Vjosa Osmani, met with the Prime Minister of Mozambique, Maria Benvinda Levy, where they discussed common challenges and opportunities to strengthen co-operation between the two countries.
Myanmar	In January 2014, it was reported that Myanmar's Ministry of Foreign Affairs had sent a note to officials in Kosovo informing them that they had recognised Kosovo's independence. However, Pacolli and Hoxhaj quickly denied that they had received any such note.

===== N =====
Country	Position
Namibia	In September 2010, following talks with Namibian officials, Serbian Foreign Minister Vuk Jeremić stated that Namibia has no intentions of recognising Kosovo. The Foreign Minister of Namibia Utoni Nujoma said that the most important thing was to continue to search for a peaceful solution to the problem of Kosovo and that opportunities should be sought for reconciliation between nations in the Balkans.
Nepal	A leaked 2009 cable from the US embassy in Kathmandu states that during a meeting with US Assistant Secretary Richard Boucher, the Foreign Secretary of Nepal, Gyan Chandra Acharya, said that the Government of Nepal had yet to decide if it would recognise the independence of Kosovo. Acharya acknowledged that Nepal understood the US interest in Kosovo's recognition but could not make a decision at the time because of regional sensitivities.
Nicaragua	In February 2008, Nicaragua's Foreign Minister, Samuel Santos, said that his country maintained a position of "observation" to the unilateral declaration of independence of Kosovo. "Nicaragua is watching the issue of Kosovo's independence, we have friends who are in agreement with this independence and other friends who disagree, there are some who are saying that [independence] is a threat to peace in that tender area. We just look at [this case and] we have no opinion on this issue."
Nigeria	Main article: Nigeria's reaction to the 2008 Kosovo declaration of independence In July 2009, Umaru Yar'Adua, President of Nigeria, said that Nigeria will not recognise Kosovo as an independent nation. He said the decision not to recognise Kosovo was informed by Nigeria's historical experience of the civil war of 1967 to 1970.

===== P =====
Country	Position
Paraguay	In February 2008, the Ministry of Foreign Relations of Paraguay published a statement saying that Paraguay took note of the independence declaration and was analysing the situation. In April 2010, it was reported that the Paraguayan president had told Kosovan pilot James Berisha, who was on an awareness-raising journey around Central and South America, that Paraguay had already recognised Kosovo's independence but had not made this known so as not to jeopardise their relationship with Russia.
Philippines	In February 2008, Foreign Affairs Secretary Alberto Romulo said in a statement: "Considering the existing sensibilities in the region, continued dialogue should be encouraged among all the parties concerned to ensure regional stability". He also said the Philippines was not willing to recognise Kosovo as an independent nation. On 19 February 2008, Romulo stated that recognition could complicate peace talks with Muslim separatists in Mindanao. He said that "while the Philippines does not oppose the idea of independence for Kosovo, it would prefer a settlement ... taking into account the internationally accepted principles of sovereignty and territorial integrity". In a November 2012 meeting with Kosovo's Foreign Minister, Enver Hoxhaj, Foreign Affairs Undersecretary, Rafael E. Seguis, pledged support for Kosovo, saying that his country has full understanding for the independence of Kosovo and that he would consider the request for recognition.

===== R =====
Country	Position
Romania	Main article: Romania's reaction to the 2008 Kosovo declaration of independence Romania has historically maintained a close relation with Serbia, which it borders for 546 kilometres. While this is an important factor, the main reason Romania does not recognise the independence of Kosovo remains the Székely Land problem, Székely Land being a mostly Hungarian inhabited zone of Romania that has historically called for autonomy within Romania. On 18 February 2008, a joining sitting in the Parliament of Romania firmly voted against the recognition of Kosovo, with 357 votes against recognising and only 27 votes for recognising. All the major parties, excluding the Democratic Alliance of Hungarians in Romania (UDMR), opposed recognition, as well as the president Traian Băsescu and prime-minister Călin Popescu-Tăriceanu. A potential reversion of the 2008 decision came in 2015, when Prime Minister Victor Ponta highlighted the changes that occurred in both Kosovo and Romania over the past years and hinted that Romania may follow the general position of the European Union regarding Kosovo. Romania is one of the five countries that are members of the European Union but do not recognise Kosovo. While official relations do not exist, Romania maintains a liaison office in Pristina. Kosovar citizens can travel to Romania visa-free and Romania recognises the Kosovar passport as legitimate.
Russia	Main article: Russia's reaction to the 2008 Kosovo declaration of independence Russia has strongly opposed Kosovo's independence. But in 2014, when it recognised the Declaration of Independence of the Republic of Crimea, Russia's Ministry of Foreign Affairs cited Kosovo's declaration and the ICJ decision as evidence that unilateral declarations of independence are not inconsistent with international law (the Kosovo independence precedent).
Rwanda	On 11 February 2009, the Director of International Organisations at Rwanda's Foreign Ministry, Ben Rutsinga, said that the African Union had no unified position on Kosovo independence and that Rwanda would not reach an "individual determination" in advance of such a unified position. On 18 September 2009, the Rwandan Foreign Minister, Rosemary Museminali, said that some countries would be likely to criticise a Rwandan recognition of Kosovo, accusing Rwanda of taking that stance in order to lay the basis for a similar breakaway by parts of eastern Democratic Republic of the Congo. She added that the Government of Kosovo had requested a meeting with her, but she had not responded.

===== S =====
Country	Position
Saint Vincent and the Grenadines	In February 2008, when asked about Kosovo, the Prime Minister of St. Vincent & the Grenadines, Ralph Gonsalves, said that "if the people of a country want independence, then I think they should have it". At a meeting in August 2011 with U.S. Representative, Eliot Engel, both St. Vincent & the Grenadines' Prime Minister and Foreign Minister, Ralph Gonsalves and Louis Straker, took on board the case for recognition of Kosovo and promised to review the issue.
São Tomé and Príncipe	In March 2012, São Tomé and Príncipe's Council of Ministers under then Prime Minister Patrice Trovoada adopted a resolution recognising Kosovo's independence. In January 2013, President Manuel Pinto da Costa issued a communication stating that the recognition was invalid as he had not been consulted on the decision, as required by the country's Constitution. New Prime Minister Gabriel Costa said that the process of recognition was an anomalous situation. Kosovo Foreign Minister, Enver Hoxhaj, insisted that the recognition remains valid. First Deputy Prime Minister of Kosovo Behgjet Pacolli said that he received a note verbale recognising Kosovo from Trovoada and that it was a closed issue.
Serbia	See above
Seychelles	In September 2012, the Seychelles' Foreign Minister, Jean-Paul Adam, said that his country was not against Kosovo's independence, and that formal recognition would occur very soon. In September 2014, Adam said that Seychelles would consider the recognition of Kosovo with utmost seriousness.
Slovakia	Main article: Slovakia's reaction to the 2008 Kosovo declaration of independence Slovakia has not recognised Kosovo, but has given indications that its stance could change in the future, especially if independence will be agreed with Serbia. Slovakia recognises travel documents issued by Kosovo.
South Africa	Main article: South Africa's reaction to the 2008 Kosovo declaration of independence South Africa's reaction to the independence of Kosovo has been mixed.
South Sudan	Main article: Kosovo–South Sudan relations In July 2011, Kosovo's First deputy prime minister, Behgjet Pacolli, was invited to attend South Sudan's independence ceremony. In September 2012, South Sudan's vice-president, Riek Machar Teny, invited Kosovo's prime minister, Hashim Thaçi, to South Sudan to discuss building bilateral relations between the two countries. During an October 2012 meeting with Pacolli, South Sudan's president Salva Kiir stated his country's desire to maintain friendly relations with Kosovo. He reiterated the position that South Sudan supports the right of the citizens of Kosovo to build and consolidate their state. In September 2013, the Foreign Minister of South Sudan, Barnaba Marial Benjamin, confirmed that the recognition of Kosovo was a matter of time. In April 2014, Benjamin said that positive news regarding improving relations with Kosovo should be expected. In September 2014, Benjamin said that South Sudan was considering with seriousness the recognition of the independence and would follow all the procedures to do so. On 2 March 2024, Kosovo's president Vjosa Osmani met South Sudanese foreign minister James Pitia Morgan and discussed the strengthening of co-operation between the two countries. A statement from the South Sudanese foreign ministry referred to Osmani as the "President of the Republic of Kosovo" implying acknowledgement of the Republic of Kosovo as a state.
Spain	Main article: Spain's reaction to the 2008 Kosovo declaration of independence Spain has been the only major country in Western Europe that has not recognised Kosovo, originally because of objections to the legality of its unilateral declaration of independence under international law, and also due to concerns about possible implications regarding its own issues with domestic independence movements. In 2022, Spanish Prime Minister Pedro Sánchez reaffirmed Spain's nonrecognition of Kosovo, stating that their declaration of independence violated international law. In January 2024, with the liberalisation of visas for Kosovo passports in the Schengen area, Spain recognised Kosovar passports, although Spanish Foreign Minister José Manuel Albares stated that Spain's position of non-recognition of Kosovo's independence would remain unchanged.
Sri Lanka	Main article: Kosovo–Sri Lanka relations In February 2008, the Foreign Ministry of Sri Lanka called Kosovo's declaration of independence a violation of the UN Charter and emphasised its concern that the act "could set an unmanageable precedent in the conduct of international relations, the established global order of sovereign States and could thus pose a grave threat to international peace and security".

===== T =====
Country	Position
Tajikistan	In February 2008, the Chairman of the International Affairs Committee of the Tajik Assembly of Representatives, Asomudin Saidov, stated that Tajikistan will not recognise Kosovo's independence as it considers it to be a violation of legal norms and a danger for Europe. According to leaked US cables, Tajikistan does not want to take a position on Kosovo due to concerns with the precedent for Abkhazia and South Ossetia.
Trinidad and Tobago	On 20 February 2008, Trinidad and Tobago's Foreign Minister Paula Gopee-Scoon took a positive stance and promised the US Ambassador that she would pursue the matter of Kosovo's recognition. At a meeting on 25 March 2009 with Kosovo's Foreign Minister, Skënder Hyseni, the Ambassador of Trinidad and Tobago to the UN, Maria Annette Valere, said that her country knows how important the process of international recognition is for Kosovo, and that the government of Trinidad and Tobago would address the request for recognition in the near future.
Tunisia	Main article: Kosovo–Tunisia relations At a meeting in October 2012 with Albanian Foreign Minister and Chairman of the Committee of Ministers of the Council of Europe, Edmond Panariti, the Tunisian Foreign Minister, Rafik Abdessalem, said that his government was seriously considering the issue of the recognition of Kosovo.
Turkmenistan	In a September 2010 meeting with Albanian Prime Minister Sali Berisha, Turkmen president Gurbanguly Berdimuhamedow said that his country would consider the recognition of Kosovo at the right time.

===== U =====
Country	Position
Uganda	Main article: Kosovo–Uganda relations In February 2008, a senior Ugandan official said that the Ugandan government was carefully studying Kosovo's declaration of independence before it makes a decision to recognise it as a state or not. On 30 July 2023, President of Uganda Yoweri Museveni visited Belgrade and was thanked by his Serbian counterpart for his support for Serbian territorial integrity.
Ukraine	Main article: Ukraine's reaction to the 2008 Kosovo declaration of independence Ukraine has, as of August 2020, not recognised the independence of Kosovo. On 6 August 2022, a resolution was presented in the Verkhovna Rada by the European Solidarity party, which would recognise Kosovo as an independent state if passed.
Uruguay	According to Últimas Noticias, in March 2008, "Uruguay has not recognised Kosovo's declaration of independence, because doing so would not be in accordance with its required three pillars of recognition: the principle of territorial integrity of states, achieving a solution through dialogue and consensus, and recognition by international organisations." On 27 September 2010, Uruguayan Deputy Foreign Minister Roberto Conde, stated that Uruguay would never recognise the independence of Kosovo.
Uzbekistan	In February 2008, the Uzbek government stated that questions of independence should be decided in the UN assembly. As for Kosovo, Uzbekistan has yet to come up with a final position.

===== V =====
Country	Position
Venezuela	Main article: Kosovo–Venezuela relations In February 2008, Venezuelan president Hugo Chávez announced that Venezuela did not recognise Kosovo's independence on the grounds that it had been achieved through United States pressure. On 24 March 2008, Chávez accused Washington of trying to "weaken Russia" by supporting independence for Kosovo. He called Kosovo's prime minister, Hashim Thaçi, a "terrorist" put in power by the United States.
Vietnam	In February 2008, the Vietnamese UN Ambassador Le Luong Minh "reaffirmed Vietnam policy that the fact that Kosovo's unilateral declaration of independence is not a correct implementation of the U.N. Security Council Resolution 1244 and that will only complicate the situation in Kosovo and the Balkan region". In a 23 February 2011 meeting with Serbian Foreign Minister Vuk Jeremić, Vietnamese deputy prime minister, Pham Gia Khiem, reaffirmed Vietnam's position of supporting "Kosovo-related issues under the United Nations Security Council's decree to gain comprehensive measures in terms of respecting national sovereignty and territorial integrity, and assuring the benefits of involved nations". In a 24 November 2011 meeting with Albanian deputy prime minister and Foreign Minister, Edmond Haxhinasto, Vietnam's Foreign Minister, Pham Binh Minh, said that Vietnam was following the developments in Kosovo, and that Serbia and Kosovo should continue the dialogue to find common ground that will be acceptable to both parties.

===== Z =====
Country	Position
Zambia	Main article: Kosovo–Zambia relations In March 2008, Zambian Foreign Minister, Kabinga Pande, said that Zambia had not decided its position on the declaration of Kosovo's independence. Pande said the government needed more time to analyse the matter. According to leaked US cables, Zambia did not want to take a position on Kosovo due to concerns with the precedent for the Lozi tribe, an ethnic group primarily inhabiting western Zambia, which had an active separatist movement for independence from Zambia.
Zimbabwe	In April 2011, Claudius Nhema, Deputy Director of Protocol in the Foreign Ministry of Zimbabwe, reportedly told Kosovan pilot James Berisha that Zimbabwe would be considering Kosovo's recognition, but that they should wait for a recommendation from the Zimbabwean UN representative who should bring it to the Foreign Ministry after which it would be taken to Parliament for ratification. In February 2013, the then Prime Minister of Zimbabwe, Morgan Tsvangirai, said that he would consider recognising Kosovo.

==== Other states and entities ====
Country	Position
Abkhazia	In February 2008, Abkhazian president Sergei Bagapsh, regarded "the promotion of Kosovo by the U.S.A. and some European states towards the declaration of independence as a visible demonstration of the policy of double standards". "Why does not the world community put any attention to the violent actions against ethnic minorities living in Kosovo..., the lack of interethnic reconciliation...", Bagapsh noted. "We are solidly convinced of the fact that [now] we have got an even wider moral base for the recognition of our independence." On 5 September 2008, the Abkhazian Foreign Minister Sergei Shamba said he was ready to recognise Kosovo's independence, "if Kosovo agrees to recognize our own (Abkhazia) independence, we will certainly recognize them as well".
Holy See	Main article: Holy See's reaction to the 2008 Kosovo declaration of independence The Holy See does not recognise Kosovo and supports the territorial respect and integrity of Serbia and per UN 1244, part of agreement with Eastern Orthodox Church, and this has led to a warming of Holy See-Serbia relations. The Cardinal Walter Kasper, President of the Pontifical Council for Promoting Christian Unity, stated that the Holy See had not recognised the independence of Kosovo and did not intend to do so in the future.
Northern Cyprus	In February 2008, the President of Northern Cyprus Mehmet Ali Talat welcomed Kosovo's independence, but a presidential spokesman said that the Turkish Republic of Northern Cyprus was not planning to recognise Kosovo.
Palestine	In February 2008, two senior Palestinian officials representing the Mahmoud Abbas West Bank-controlling government, who are also part of the team negotiating with Israel, disagreed on what the Kosovo events implied for Palestine. Yasser Abed Rabbo said, "If things are not going in the direction of continuous and serious negotiations, then we should take the step and announce our independence unilaterally. Kosovo is not better than us. We deserve independence even before Kosovo, and we ask for the backing of the United States and the European Union for our independence". Saeb Erekat responded that the Palestine Liberation Organization had already declared independence in 1988. "Now we need real independence, not a declaration," said Erekat, "We need real independence by ending the occupation. We are not Kosovo. We are under Israeli occupation and for independence we need to acquire independence". During a July 2009 state visit to Serbia, President of the Palestinian National Authority, Mahmoud Abbas, when discussing both the situations in the Middle East and Kosovo said, "We are looking for a way to resolve these problems in a peaceful way, by upholding international law. We cannot impose solutions nor can we accept imposed solutions. That is why we must negotiate". In September 2011, during the meeting of Foreign Ministers of the Non-Aligned Movement summit in Belgrade, the Palestinian Ambassador to the UN Riyad Mansour said that Palestine was a "typical foreign occupation which cannot be compared to the issue of Kosovo" as confirmed by international law and the UN.
Sahrawi Republic	The Polisario Front, which governs the Sahrawi Arab Democratic Republic, has stated that the speedy recognition of Kosovo's independence by many countries shows the double standards of the international community, considering that the Western Sahara issue remains unsolved after three decades.
Somaliland	In 2010, the President of Somaliland, Ahmed Mahamoud Silanyo, said, "We are heartened by Kosovo and what's happened to Southern Sudan that means it opens the door for us. The principle that countries should remain as they were at the time of independence has changed so why should it not work for us as well".
South Ossetia	In February 2008, the South Ossetian president, Eduard Kokoity, stated that it is not fair to compare this breakaway region with Kosovo because South Ossetians have far more right to a state of their own than Kosovo Albanians. He said that "Kosovo Albanians got independence after NATO's aggression on Serbia. Americans and NATO member countries took away Serbia's province. I feel sincerely for the Serb people," and that "Serbs had a well-organized state that provided for a normal life for Albanians. For this reason, what Americans have done to the Serbs was injustice".
Transnistria	Transnistria has no policy towards Kosovo, but the Transnistrian Foreign Ministry has said that "The declaration and recognition of Kosovo are of fundamental importance, since thereby a new conflict settlement model has been established, based on the priority of people's right to self-determination. Pridnestrovie [Transnistria] holds that this model should be applicable to all conflicts which have similar political, legal, and economic bases".

== Positions taken by intergovernmental organisations ==
Intergovernmental organisations do not themselves diplomatically recognise any state; their member states do so individually. However, depending on the intergovernmental organisation's rules of internal governance and the positions of their member states, they may express positive or negative opinions as to declarations of independence, or choose to offer or withhold membership to a partially recognised state.

International organisation	Position
Arab League	In May 2009, the Secretary General of the Arab League, Amr Moussa, welcomed a request by Kosovo's Foreign Minister, Skënder Hyseni, to establish regular communications. At a meeting on 18 June 2009 with Hyseni, the representative of the Arab League to the UN, Yahya Mahmassani, said that the Kosovo issue was being discussed at the Arab League, and that there would be gradual movement towards recognition as most Arab states are supportive of Kosovo. Member states (16 / 22) Algeria • Bahrain ^{†} • Comoros ^{†} • Djibouti ^{†} • Egypt ^{†} • Iraq • Jordan ^{†} • Kuwait ^{†} • Lebanon • Libya ^{†} • Mauritania ^{†} • Morocco • Oman ^{†} • Palestine • Qatar ^{†} • Saudi Arabia ^{†} • Somalia ^{†} • Sudan ^{†} • Syria ^{†} • Tunisia • United Arab Emirates ^{†} • Yemen ^{†}^{†} – Have recognised Kosovo.
Caribbean Community (CARICOM)	In August 2010, Albanian Parliament Speaker Jozefina Topalli received a letter from the chairman of the Grenadian Parliament, George J. McGuire, stating that CARICOM members would soon make a joint decision on the recognition of Kosovo. On 19 August 2011, it was reported that the CARICOM members had made a joint decision to recognise Kosovo, but that each state would announce official recognition separately. Member states (11 / 15) Antigua and Barbuda ^{†} • Bahamas ^{†} • Barbados ^{†} • Belize ^{†} • Dominica • Grenada ^{†} • Guyana ^{†} • Haiti ^{†} • Jamaica • Montserrat ^{‡} • Saint Kitts and Nevis ^{†} • Saint Lucia ^{†} • Saint Vincent and the Grenadines • Suriname ^{†} • Trinidad and Tobago^{†} – Have recognised Kosovo.^{‡} – British Overseas Territory; the UK (which recognises Kosovo) represents its foreign affairs.
Council of Europe (CoE)	Kosovo plans to apply for membership in the CoE since it considers that it fulfills the statutory requirements to do so. If Kosovo receives positive votes from 2/3 of the member countries, it will be admitted to the CoE. Kosovo has already been recognised by 2/3 of the CoE members, thus it should be able to join the organisation. In May 2012, the Chairman of the Committee of Ministers of the CoE, Edmond Haxhinasto, pledged to work for a stronger role for Kosovo during the Albanian chairmanship of the Council. Haxhinasto added that Kosovo would in the near future be a part of the family of states of the Council of Europe. However, the Secretary-General of the CoE, Thorbjørn Jagland, commented that membership of Kosovo depends on the willingness of members. The Council of Europe Development Bank's board of directors voted in favour of Kosovo's membership on 14 June 2013 during their meeting in Malta. In June 2014, Kosovo became a member state of the Venice Commission, an advisory body of the Council of Europe. On 24 April 2023, the first phase of Kosovo's bid to join the Council of Europe was completed, when it was accepted by the Committee of Ministers with a two-thirds majority. However, since May 2024, Germany (supported by France and Italy) have blocked a final vote on Kosovo's membership until the Kosovo government submits a revised draft statute of the proposed Community of Serb Municipalities to the Constitutional Court of Kosovo for review, a step which the Kosovo government has thus far been unwilling to take. Member states (34 / 46) Albania ^{†} • Andorra ^{†} • Armenia • Austria ^{†} • Azerbaijan • Belgium ^{†} • Bosnia and Herzegovina • Bulgaria ^{†} • Croatia ^{†} • Cyprus • Czech Republic ^{†} • Denmark ^{†} • Estonia ^{†} • Finland ^{†} • France ^{†} • Georgia • Germany ^{†} • Greece • Hungary ^{†} • Iceland ^{†} • Ireland ^{†} • Italy ^{†} • Latvia ^{†} • Liechtenstein ^{†} • Lithuania ^{†} • Luxembourg ^{†} • Malta ^{†} • Moldova • Monaco ^{†} • Montenegro ^{†} • Netherlands ^{†} • North Macedonia ^{†} • Norway ^{†} • Poland ^{†} • Portugal ^{†} • Romania • San Marino ^{†} • Serbia • Slovakia • Slovenia ^{†} • Spain • Sweden ^{†} • Switzerland ^{†} • Turkey ^{†} • Ukraine • United Kingdom ^{†}^{†} – Have recognised Kosovo.
European Bank for Reconstruction and Development (EBRD)	A resolution, agreeing to the membership of Kosovo in the EBRD, was approved by its Board of Governors on 16 November 2012, providing that, by 17 December 2012, it has completed the necessary internal procedures. On 8 February 2013, Kosovo's Foreign Minister, Enver Hoxhaj, and the President of EBRD, Suma Chakrabarti, signed an agreement on economic co-operation and activities.
European Union (EU)	Main article: Accession of Kosovo to the European Union The EU, like other IGOs, does not possess the legal capacity to diplomatically recognise any state; member states do so individually. The majority of member states have recognised Kosovo. To articulate a common EU policy of either support or opposition to Kosovo's independence would require unanimity on the subject from all 27 member states, which does not presently exist. On 18 February 2008, the EU officially stated that it would "take note" of the resolution of the Kosovo assembly. The EU sent a EULEX mission to Kosovo, which included a special representative and 2,000 police and judicial personnel. Although the European Parliament has not been formally vested with the authority to shape the EU's foreign policy, it was seen to be expressing its acceptance of Kosovan independence when it hosted the Kosovan Assembly in an interparliamentary meeting on 30 May 2008. This was also the first time Kosovo's flag was officially hoisted at an EU institution. On 5 February 2009, the European Parliament adopted a resolution that encouraged all EU member states to recognise Kosovo. The resolution also welcomed the successful deployment of EULEX across Kosovo, and rejected the possibility of Kosovo's partition. It was passed with 424 votes in favour and 133 against. Some Romanian and Communist representatives called for a new international conference on Kosovo's status or to allow the northern part of the country to join Serbia. On 8 July 2010, the European Parliament adopted a resolution welcoming "the recognition by all Member States of the independence of Kosovo", and stating that EU member states should "step up their common approach towards Kosovo". The resolution rejected the possibility of a partition of Kosovo. On 29 March 2012, the European Parliament adopted a resolution that urged the five EU member states that had not recognised Kosovo's independence to do so. Member states (22 / 27) Candidates (4 / 5) Austria ^{†} • Belgium ^{†} • Bulgaria ^{†} • Cyprus • Croatia ^{†} • Czech Republic ^{†} • Denmark ^{†} • Estonia ^{†} • Finland ^{†} • France ^{†} • Germany ^{†} • Greece • Hungary ^{†} • Ireland ^{†} • Italy ^{†} • Latvia ^{†} • Lithuania ^{†} • Luxembourg ^{†} • Malta ^{†} • Netherlands ^{†} • Poland ^{†} • Portugal ^{†} • Romania • Slovakia • **Slovenia** ^{†} • Spain • Sweden ^{†} Candidates: Albania ^{†} • Montenegro ^{†} • North Macedonia ^{†} • Serbia • Turkey ^{†} **Bold** – Presiding the Council of the European Union at time of declaration^{†} – Have recognised Kosovo.
International Monetary Fund (IMF)	On 15 July 2008, the IMF issued a statement saying "It has been determined that Kosovo has seceded from Serbia as a new independent state and that Serbia is the continuing state," thus acknowledging the separation of Kosovo from Serbia. After their membership was approved in a secret ballot by 108 states, Kosovo signed the IMF's Articles of Agreement on 29 June 2009 to become a full member of the fund.
Interpol	To become a member of Interpol, a country would need the votes of 2/3 of Interpol's 195 members. Kosovo has tried to join Interpol on three different occasions, most recently in November 2018, when it received positive votes from 68 countries, falling short of the two-thirds majority needed.
International Organization for Migration (IOM)	At a meeting on 30 March 2012 with Kosovo's Deputy Foreign Minister, Petrit Selimi, deputy director of the IOM, Laura Thomson, expressed readiness to continue advanced discussions with the representatives of Kosovo to further advance the prospects for membership.
North Atlantic Treaty Organization (NATO)	Main article: Kosovo–NATO relations NATO maintains that its ongoing Kosovo Force mission and mandate remain unchanged and that "NATO reaffirms that KFOR shall remain in Kosovo on the basis of UNSCR 1244, as agreed by Foreign Ministers in December 2007, unless the UN Security Council decides otherwise". Member states (28 / 32) Candidates (0 / 1) Albania ^{†} • Belgium ^{†} • Bulgaria ^{†} • Canada ^{†} • Croatia ^{†} • Czech Republic ^{†} • Denmark ^{†} • Estonia ^{†} • Finland ^{†} • France ^{†} • Germany ^{†} • Greece • Hungary ^{†} • Iceland ^{†} • Italy ^{†} • Latvia ^{†} • Lithuania ^{†} • Luxembourg ^{†} • Montenegro ^{†} • Netherlands ^{†} • North Macedonia ^{†} • Norway ^{†} • Poland ^{†} • Portugal ^{†} • Romania • Slovakia • Slovenia ^{†} • Spain • Sweden ^{†} • Turkey ^{†} • United Kingdom ^{†} • United States ^{†} Candidates: Bosnia and Herzegovina^{†} – Have recognised Kosovo.
Organisation of Islamic Cooperation (OIC)	In February 2008, Secretary General of the OIC Ekmeleddin İhsanoğlu said "Kosovo has finally declared its independence after a long and determined struggle by its people. As we rejoice this happy result, we declare our solidarity with and support to our brothers and sisters there. The Islamic Umma wishes them success in their new battle awaiting them which is the building of a strong and prosperous a state capable of satisfying of its people". The OIC did not call on its individual member states to extend recognition, as some member states, including Azerbaijan, Egypt, Indonesia and Sudan, were firmly against any issuance of such a statement. On 25 May 2009, at the OIC's 36th session of the Council of Foreign Ministers in Damascus, the 57 member states adopted a resolution that noted Kosovo's declaration of independence, upheld the role of the UN in Kosovo, reaffirmed the strong interest of the OIC regarding Muslims in the Balkans, welcomed the co-operation of Kosovo with the OIC Economic and Financial institutions, and called on the international community to continue contributing to the fostering of Kosovo's economy. It has been reported that an earlier draft of the resolution (tabled by Saudi Arabia) had called for recognition of Kosovo by Islamic countries, but this was rejected by some member states, including Syria, Egypt and Azerbaijan. The OIC mechanism is similar to the one adopted by the EU which leaves it up to member states to decide. In June 2011, the OIC adopted a resolution calling on member states to consider recognising Kosovo but once again it left the recognition issue to individual member states. In November 2012, the OIC adopted a resolution calling on member states to consider recognising Kosovo based on their free and sovereign rights as well as on their national practice. İhsanoğlu expressed support for strengthening the international subjectivity of the Republic of Kosovo. In February 2013, the OIC renewed the previous resolution and urged all of its member states to recognise Kosovo. Member states (37 / 57) Afghanistan ^{†} • Albania ^{†} • Algeria • Azerbaijan • Bahrain ^{†} • Bangladesh ^{†} • Benin ^{†} • Burkina Faso ^{†} • Brunei ^{†} • Cameroon • Chad ^{†} • Comoros ^{†} • Côte d'Ivoire ^{†} • Djibouti ^{†} • Egypt ^{†} • Gabon ^{†} • Gambia ^{†} • Guinea ^{†} • Guinea-Bissau ^{†} • Guyana ^{†} • Indonesia • Iran • Iraq • Jordan ^{†} • Kuwait ^{†} • Kazakhstan • Kyrgyzstan • Lebanon • Libya ^{†} • Maldives ^{†} • Malaysia ^{†} • Mali • Mauritania ^{†} • Morocco • Mozambique • Niger ^{†} • Nigeria • Oman ^{†} • Pakistan ^{†} • Palestine • Qatar ^{†} • Saudi Arabia ^{†} • Senegal ^{†} • Sierra Leone ^{†} • Somalia ^{†} • Sudan ^{†} • Suriname ^{†} • Syria ^{†} • Tajikistan • Togo • Tunisia • Turkey ^{†} • Turkmenistan • Uganda • United Arab Emirates ^{†} • Uzbekistan • Yemen ^{†}^{†} – Have recognised Kosovo.
Organization for Security and Co-operation in Europe (OSCE)	On 19 February 2008, Chairman Ilkka Kanerva and OSCE Minorities Commissioner Knut Vollebæk called for Kosovo's government to vigorously implement agreed-upon frameworks regarding minorities. Serbia has vowed to oppose OSCE membership for Kosovo and is calling for the organisation to condemn the declaration of independence. Member states (36 / 56) Albania ^{†} • Andorra ^{†} • Armenia • Austria ^{†} • Azerbaijan • Belarus • Belgium ^{†} • Bosnia and Herzegovina • Bulgaria ^{†} • Canada ^{†} • Croatia ^{†} • Cyprus • Czech Republic ^{†} • Denmark ^{†} • Estonia ^{†} • Finland ^{†} • France ^{†} • Georgia • Germany ^{†} • Greece • Hungary ^{†} • Iceland ^{†} • Ireland ^{†} • Italy ^{†} • Kazakhstan • Kyrgyzstan • Latvia ^{†} • Liechtenstein ^{†} • Lithuania ^{†} • Luxembourg ^{†} • Malta ^{†} • Moldova • Monaco ^{†} • Montenegro ^{†} • Netherlands ^{†} • North Macedonia ^{†} • Norway ^{†} • Poland ^{†} • Portugal ^{†} • Romania • Russia • San Marino ^{†} • Serbia • Slovakia • Slovenia ^{†} • Spain • Sweden ^{†} • Switzerland ^{†} • Tajikistan • Turkey ^{†} • Turkmenistan • Ukraine • United Kingdom ^{†} • United States ^{†} • Uzbekistan • Vatican City^{†} – Have recognised Kosovo.
United Nations (UN)	Russia called an emergency session of the United Nations Security Council on 17 February 2008, but the council members, given differences in stated position between permanent members, failed to reach a consensus. Russia requested another meeting on 18 February. In March 2008 the UNMIK mission in Kosovo told the Serbian government to cease its interference in North Kosovo after local Serbs burned down a customs office set up by the Republic of Kosovo. In order for Kosovo to attain a UN seat, it would require the agreement of the five permanent members of the Security Council, of which only three currently recognise Kosovo: UK, France, and the US. On 17 January 2012, the President of Kosovo, Atifete Jahjaga, had a meeting with the president of the United Nations General Assembly, Nassir Abdulaziz Al-Nasser, who stated that he will continue to support Kosovo in all initiatives and processes through which it is running. On 11 July 2012, the elected President of the United Nations General Assembly, Serb Vuk Jeremić, said that Kosovo's move to join the UN during his upcoming presidency of the UN General Assembly would be "an act of pointless provocation". "As long as Serbia presides over the UN, and that's for the next year, this could only happen over my dead body," Jeremić said. However, Secretary-General Ban Ki-moon said that Jeremić should have stated this as an official of Serbia, not as the President of the UN General Assembly. **Member states (110 / 193)** Permanent members of Security Council (3 / 5) China • France ^{†} • Russia • United Kingdom ^{†} • United States ^{†}^{†} – Have recognised Kosovo.
World Bank	On 29 June 2009, the Republic of Kosovo became a full member of the World Bank.
World Customs Organization	On 3 March 2017, the Republic of Kosovo became a full member of the World Customs Organization.

== Positions taken by other actors ==
=== Autonomous regions and secessionist movements ===
Entity	Position
Balochistan	In August 2010, former Baloch separatist leader Jumma Khan Marri welcomed the independence of Kosovo and the advisory opinion by the ICJ that the declaration of independence by Kosovo was not in violation of international law. However, Jumma Khan Marri has since distanced himself from the movement and now advocates against secession. In October 2010, former Minister of Fisheries and opposition member of the Balochistan Assembly Kachkol Ali hailed the decision of the International Court of Justice on Kosovo's declaration of Independence as "a glorious judgment for the national liberation movements". He said that it was a beacon of hope for enslaved nations.
Basque Government	The regional Basque government, unlike the central Spanish government in Madrid, responded very positively to Kosovo's declaration of independence. A regional government spokeswoman said that "It's a lesson to be followed when it comes to peaceful and democratic solutions of the identity and allegiance problems ... It shows that respect of the citizens' will is the key to solving difficult political problems".
Catalonia	In July 2010, following the ICJ decision, the Catalan nationalist parties expressed that there are clear parallels between their case and Kosovo's. Joan Puigcercós, the President of the Republican Left of Catalonia, stated that the ICJ decision shows that Catalonia's independence could be legal and recognised at an international level. The Democratic Convergence of Catalonia party asked the Spanish Government to recognise Kosovo's independence and the right of self-determination of the people. On 23 July 2010, José Montilla, President of the Generalitat of Catalonia, said that Catalonia and Kosovo have little in common. In March 2012 during a fierce debate with Spanish prime minister Mariano Rajoy, Convergence and Union general secretary Josep Antoni Duran i Lleida asked for the immediate recognition of Kosovo by Spain, and stated that the reasons for non-recognition "are not international but internal".
Kabyle Government in Exile (government in exile)	On October 25, 2025 the Kabyle Government in Exile cited the 2010 advisory opinion of the International Court of Justice on Kosovo as the basis for their right of independence from Algeria. Also the Kabyle government in exile said that the Kabyle people have been, since 1962, victims of a policy of forced assimilation, economic marginalization and systematic repression which has, on several occasions, taken on a genocidal and ecocidal character, attacking life, dignity and the integrity of the Kabyle territory. They also said that considering that all internal peaceful means have been exhausted, the Algerian government having refused any dialogue, any negotiation and any organization of a referendum on self-determination of the Kabyle people, the Kabyle government has declared full independence and demands recognition from the United States and the European Union.
Chechen Republic of Ichkeria (government in exile)	Usman Ferzauli, the Foreign Minister of the Chechen Republic of Ichkeria, said that his country "welcome the declaration of state independence by Kosovo and do not question the right of the people of Kosovo to distance themselves from the state that terrorized it". The Prime Minister of the Chechen Republic of Ichkeria, Akhmed Zakayev, stated in an April 2010 interview that to him and his nation, Kosovo represented a hope, and also made reference to a letter he had apparently sent to Kosovo's prime minister Hashim Thaçi congratulating the latter.
Central Tibetan Administration (government in exile)	In June 2008, an article was published on the website of the Central Tibetan Administration saying that if Kosovo has a right to independence then Tibet has every right to become an independent nation and Tibetans are fully entitled to the right of self-determination. In April 2010, the 14th Dalai Lama, then joint executive authority within the government in exile, sent a telegram of congratulations to Kosovo's prime minister, Hashim Thaçi, saying that he is satisfied with the independence of Kosovo and that he prays that Kosovo's democratic state will be a model for others to follow.
East Turkistan Government in Exile (government in exile)	On 18 February 2008, Ansar Yusuf Turani, the representative of the government-in-exile, released a press statement saying "On behalf of the people of East Turkistan, the East Turkistan Government in Exile hereby recognizes Kosovo as an independent and sovereign state and wishes peace and prosperity for the people of Kosovo".
Jammu Kashmir Liberation Front	On 11 March 2008, the Jammu Kashmir Liberation Front staged a demonstration in Brussels in front of the European Commission building. It was headed by one of its leaders, Barrister Abdul Majeed Tramboo, and its agenda cited Kosovo's independence, demanding equal treatment and commensurate application of the same solution by the EU in the Kashmir dispute involving India, Pakistan, and China. Protesters included EU Parliament members, students, and various NGO constituents and representatives.
Mejlis of the Crimean Tatar People	Mustafa Dzhemilev, the Chairman of the Mejlis of the Crimean Tatar People, declared that he supported the right of self-determination for every nation, including Kosovo. He also added that the Crimean Tatars will not start a secession process from Ukraine if their rights are respected. Cemilev stated that he believes the motive for the Kosovars to declare independence was the anti-Albanian situation in Kosovo.

=== International non-governmental organisations ===
International organisation	Position
European Broadcasting Union (EBU)	Radio Television of Kosovo (RTK) is not an active member of the EBU, and therefore, they cannot participate in the Eurovision Song Contest and sister projects. However, there is a co-operation agreement between RTK and the EBU and they were allowed to participate in the Eurovision Young Dancers 2011 competition. On 30 March 2012, during a meeting in Geneva with Kosovo's Deputy Foreign Minister Petrit Selimi, Ingrid Delterne, executive director of the EBU, expressed readiness for Kosovo's membership in the ITU.
International Olympic Committee (IOC)	The Olympic Committee of Kosovo became a full member of the International Olympic Committee on 9 December 2014. The Olympic Committee of Kosovo has been in existence since 1992. Kosovo was a provisional member of the IOC from 22 October 2014 through 9 December 2014.
Fédération Internationale de Football Association (FIFA)	Kosovo played their first official match in 2014, against Haiti. In April 2016, Kosovo was voted into UEFA, and on 13 May 2016, at the 66th FIFA congress in Mexico City, Kosovo (along with Gibraltar) was voted into the organisation. Only 23 associations voted against Kosovo's membership. They took part in their first World Cup qualifier in their 1–1 draw with Finland.
Unrepresented Nations and Peoples Organization (UNPO)	UNPO issued a statement on 18 February 2008: "for regions in similar conditions, Kosova's independence represents new hope for the future of their own potential statehood". In the days that followed, several African UNPO members expressed their own individual secession-minded reactions to Kosovo's independence.
Norwegian Nobel Committee	After former President of Finland Martti Ahtisaari received the 2008 Nobel Peace Prize "for his important efforts ... to resolve international conflicts", including his work in Kosovo as a UN special envoy, the Norwegian Nobel Committee Secretary, who had been also the Director of the Norwegian Nobel Institute, Geir Lundestad, said that the committee believed "there is no alternative to an independent Kosovo".
International Organization for Standardization (ISO)	Kosovo is not a member of the governing structures for the ISO. Independently of its ISO membership status, ISO will also potentially issue a standardised country code for Kosovo. According to rules of procedure followed by the ISO 3166 Maintenance Agency based in Geneva, a new ISO 3166-1 code for Kosovo will only be issued once it appears in the UN Terminology Bulletin Country Names or in the UN Statistics Division's list of Country and Region Codes for Statistical Use. To appear in the terminology bulletin, it must either (a) be admitted into the UN, (b) join a UN Specialised Agency or (c) become a state party to the Statute of the International Court of Justice. Criterion (b) was met when Kosovo joined the International Monetary Fund and World Bank; a terminology bulletin has yet to be circulated.
Internet Corporation for Assigned Names and Numbers (ICANN)	ICANN, through its Country Code Names Supporting Organization, is responsible for adding new country code top-level domains (ccTLDs) for use in Internet addressing. Rules of procedure dictate Kosovo must first receive an ISO 3166-1 code (discussed above) before the ccTLD can be introduced; speculation has centred on ".ks" as the likeliest candidate.
International Road and Transport Union (IRU)	Kosovo officially became the 181st member of the IRU in May 2009.
International Bar Association (IBA)	Kosovo officially became a member of the IBA on 28 May 2009.

== See also ==
- Foreign relations of Kosovo
- List of diplomatic missions in Kosovo
- List of diplomatic missions of Kosovo
- Membership of Kosovo in international organisations
- Membership of Kosovo in international sports federations
- Advisory opinion on Kosovo's declaration of independence
- Reactions to the International Court of Justice advisory opinion on Kosovo's declaration of independence
- Kosovo–Serbia relations
- Belgrade–Pristina negotiations
- List of states with limited recognition
