= Ghana–Kosovo relations =

- Ghana: Kosovo

Ghana–Kosovo relations are the bilateral relations between Ghana and Kosovo.

== History ==
Kosovo declared its independence from Serbia on 17 February 2008. On 23 January 2012, Ghana officially recognized Kosovo as an independent and sovereign state.

Media reports in 2019 claimed that Ghana had withdrawn recognition of Kosovo. However, the 2022 Kosovo Diplomatic List states that the Ghanaian embassy in Ankara, Turkey is accredited to the Republic of Kosovo with the Ghanaian ambassador in Ankara being described as "Ambassador Extraordinary and Plenipotentiary – Non resident in Pristina".

On 16 April 2025, the President of Ghana John Mahama, through the secretary of the former President of Kosovo Behgjet Pacolli, confirmed his country's position that the recognition of Kosovo's independence is in line with the values represented by Ghana, and that the earlier reports released by the Serbian state about its withdrawal are untrue.

== See also ==
- Foreign relations of Ghana
- Foreign relations of Kosovo
