= Kosovo–South Korea relations =

- Kosovo: South Korea

Kosovo–South Korea relations are the bilateral relations between Kosovo and South Korea.

Kosovo declared its independence from Serbia on 17 February 2008. The South Korean government recognized Kosovo as an independent state on 28 March 2008. However, due to the complex international situation surrounding Kosovo's international recognition, diplomatic relations have not yet been established. In the South Korean government, the South Korean Embassy in Austria and the Permanent Mission to International Organizations in Vienna concurrently handle consular affairs for Kosovo, while in the Kosovar government, the Kosovar Embassy in Japan concurrently handles consular affairs for South Korea.

Kosovar President Hashim Thaçi of Kosovo visited South Korea to attend the opening ceremony of the 2018 Winter Olympics held in Pyeongchang, South Korea on 9 February 2018. These Olympics also marked Kosovo's first-ever participation in the Winter Olympic Games.

== See also ==
- Foreign relations of Kosovo
- Foreign relations of South Korea
