= Kosovo–Qatar relations =

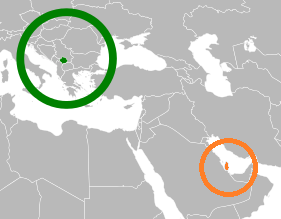

- Kosovo: Qatar

Diplomatic mission
- Embassy of Kosovo, Doha: none

Envoy
- Ambassador Fuad Morina: none

Kosovo–Qatar relations are foreign relations between Kosovo and Qatar. Kosovo declared its independence from Serbia on 17 February 2008 and Qatar recognized it on 7 January 2011. Since then, the two countries have developed a relationship with mutual recognition and shared interests, in political and economic areas.

== History ==
The case of Kosovo War was discussed by members of the Organisation of Islamic Cooperation in Qatar in 1998. On 7 January 2011, Qatar became the 73rd country to officially recognize the independence of Kosovo. Nearly in the same time Qatar voted in favor of Kosovo's membership on the World Bank. In May 2015 Deputy Foreign Minister of Kosovo Petrit Selimi visited Qatar, where he discussed with Qatari officials about existing opportunities to further the cooperation in areas such as economy and education. Some Kosovar young people work in Qatar, mainly in the service sector, attracted by good job opportunities and high salaries. This has caused among parts of Kosovo society concerns about exploitation of young workers in illegal activities.

== Political relations ==
Following Qatar's recognition of Kosovo, the two nations continued to develop and maintain relations with one another. Soon after in September 2019, Kosovo opened their embassy in Doha in the State of Qatar, aiming to strengthen their bilateral ties and enhance cooperation with one another.

Kosovo and Qatar continued to develop ties together with high-level engagements. In March 2022, the president of Kosovo at the time, Vjosa Osmani, visited Qatar thanking them for their continuous support even after Qatar's recognition. Osmani especially the evolving bilateral relations between the two countries and the existing political commitment of the two leaders to improve on their cooperation.

On 31 January 2024, Osmani made a post on X announcing the decision made in cooperation with Hamad bin Khalifa Al Thani of the agreement of a soon mutual visa waive, allowing Qatari and Kosovan citizens to freely visit each other countries.

== Economic relations ==
Qatar and Kosovo's economic relations have continued to only improve amid high-level engagements and agreements, which in turn lead to more trade and investment. In February 2024, president Osmani visited Qatar in order to promote more opportunities of investment in Kosovo. She emphasized the benefits of investment in certain sectors, such as agriculture energy and hospitality. The Qatari state then acknowledged the benefits Qatar businessmen could experience under investment in Kosovo, especially the mining and energy industry.

Following such positive discussions, a memorandum of understanding (MoU) was soon eventually signed on 21 November 2024. The agreement was signed between the Kosovo Chamber of Commerce and the Qatar Chamber. The agreement signed aims to strengthen trade and economic relations between Qatar and Kosovo. The two countries plan to achieve this by facilitating information exchange, organizing business meetings and exhibitions, as well as promoting collaboration among businessmen and investors from both countries, while encouraging foreign investment opportunities in Kosovo.

== Cultural and educational relations ==
Qatar has frequently provided several scholarships to students from Kosovo, giving talented students a change to pursue higher education studies at prestigious institutions in Doha. These acts being performed by the Qatar Scholarships initiative, which is led by the Qatar Fund for Development group, have collaborated with several unique academic partners in order to offer talented students internationally such great opportunities, including the ones from Kosovo.

High-level meetings have also taken place between officials from both Qatar and Kosovo, further enhancing these ties. In August 2022, Qatar's minister of culture, Sheikh Abdulrahman bin Hamad Al Thani, attended a meeting with the Kosovo Minister of Culture, Youth, and Sport, Hajrulla Çeku, aiming to improve on their cultural relations, along with other areas of common interest.
