= Kosovo–Zambia relations =

Kosovar–Zambian relations
- Kosovo: Zambia

Kosova–Zambia relations are the bilateral relations between Kosovo and Zambia.

== History ==
In March 2008, Zambian Foreign Minister, Kabinga Pande, said that Zambia had not decided its position on the declaration of Kosovo's independence. Pande said the government needed more time to analyse the matter.

In a September 2010 meeting with Kosovo's Foreign Minister, Skënder Hyseni, Pande said that Zambia was carefully studying the opinion of the ICJ and that the request for recognition would be processed soon. In a subsequent meeting with the Albanian Foreign Minister, Edmond Haxhinasto, Pande said that Kosovo's independence was an irreversible reality and that the decision of the ICJ's opinion eased the decision on recognition of Kosovo for many African countries.

On 27 February 2011, regarding a request to recognise Kosovo, Pande stated that "We will evaluate that request. It will have to undergo scrutiny like we always do".

In September 2012, Zambian Foreign Minister, Given Lubinda, said that his country had no reason not to recognise Kosovo.

Zambia's Minister of Home Affairs, Edgar Lungu, stated in December 2013 that his government would thoroughly discuss and clear all the grey areas before any decision could be made over Kosovo, and that recognition of Kosovo was Zambia's priority.

== See also ==
- Foreign relations of Kosovo
- Foreign relations of Zambia
- International recognition of Kosovo
