= Argentina–Kosovo relations =

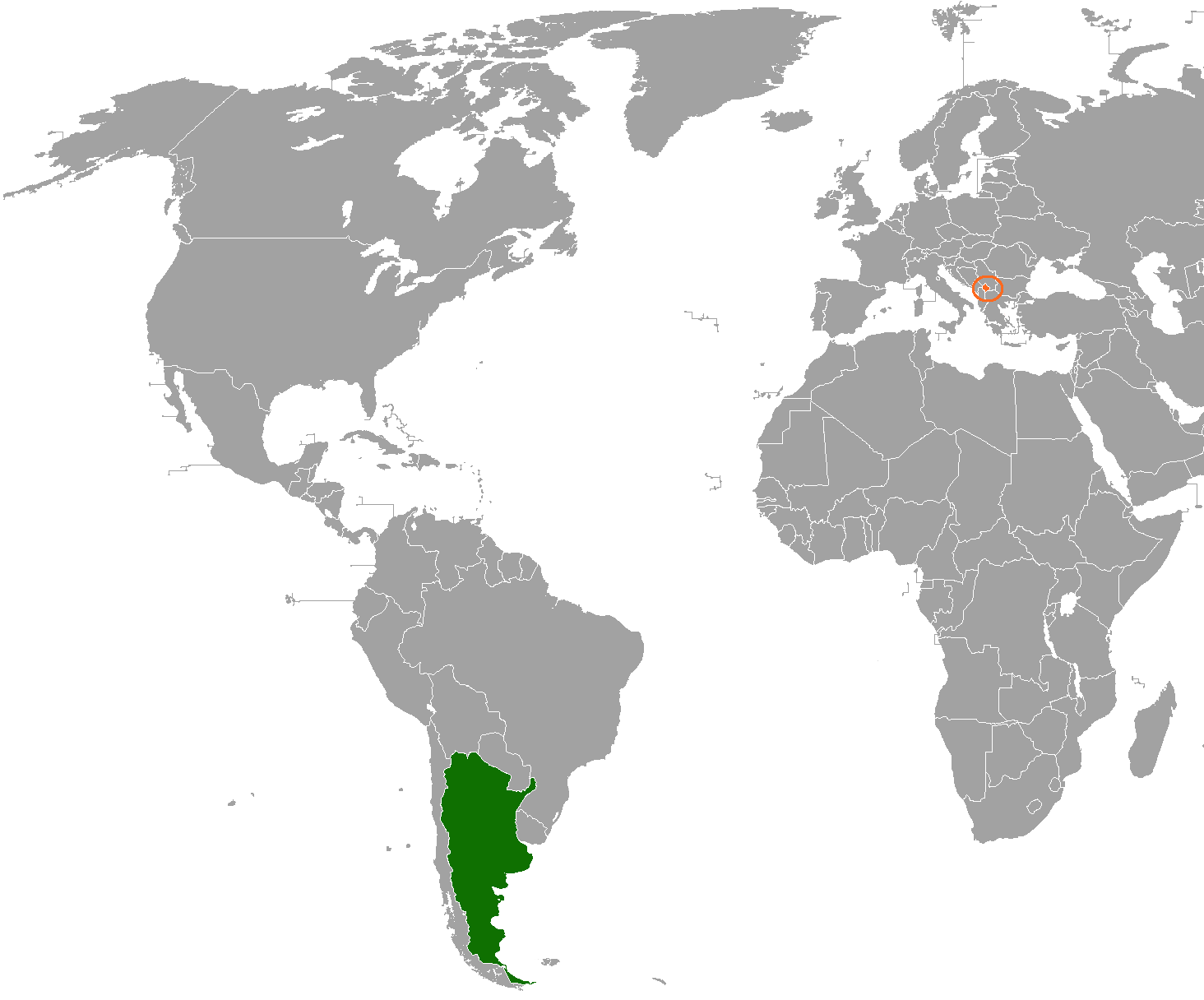
- Argentina: Kosovo

Argentina–Kosovo relations are foreign relations between Argentina and Kosovo. Formal diplomatic relations between two states are non-existent as Argentina does not recognize Kosovo as a sovereign state.

== History ==
In February 2008, Argentine Foreign Minister, Jorge Taiana said "if we were to recognize Kosovo, which has declared its independence unilaterally, without an agreement with Serbia, we would set a dangerous precedent that would seriously threaten our chances of a political settlement in the case of the Falkland Islands". He said that president Cristina Fernández de Kirchner would not give any official statement on the issue, reiterating that there would be no recognition of Kosovo, that Argentina would not recognise also because it "supports the principle of territorial integrity", and that the 1999 UNSCR 1244 called for the mutual agreement of all parties to solve the dispute.

In a 2 December 2009 hearing at the International Court of Justice, the Argentine delegation said that Kosovo's declaration of independence "breaches an obligation to respect the territorial integrity of Serbia, the obligation of peaceful settlement of disputes and principle of non-intervention. The resolution has no legal basis in the principle of self-determination," and that it "did not, and could not, abolish Serbia's sovereignty over Kosovo".

== See also ==
- Foreign relations of Argentina
- Foreign relations of Kosovo
- Argentina–Serbia relations
- Falkland Islands sovereignty dispute
