= Bolivia–Kosovo relations =

Bolivian–Kosovar relations
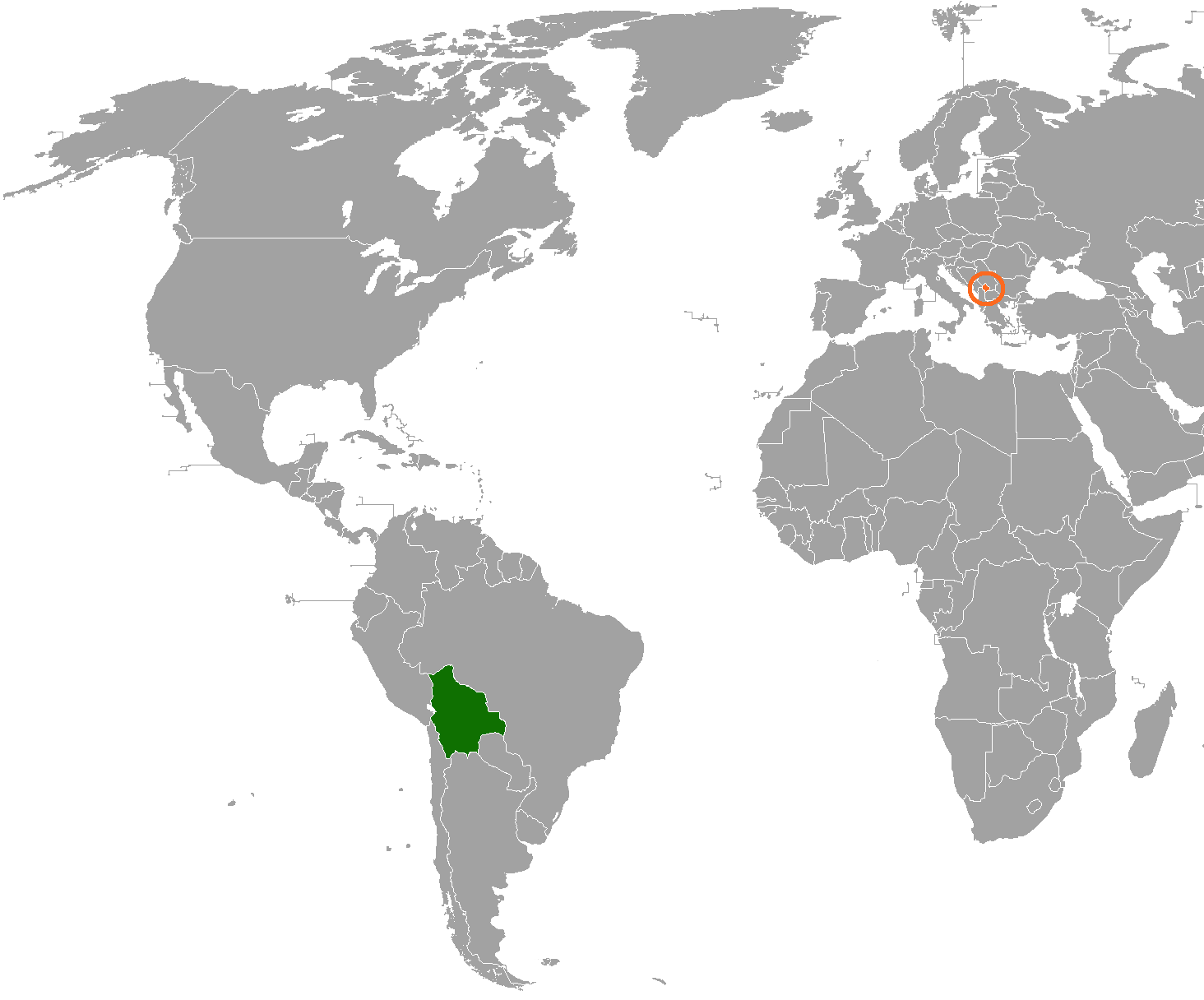
- Bolivia: Kosovo

Bolivia–Kosovo relations refers to the foreign relations between Bolivia and Kosovo. Formal diplomatic relations between two states are non-existent as Bolivia does not recognize Kosovo as a sovereign state.

== History ==
In February 2008, Bolivian president Evo Morales refused to recognise Kosovo's independence and compared Kosovo separatists to the leaders of four eastern Bolivian states who had demanded greater autonomy from the federal government. In a 4 December 2009 hearing at the International Court of Justice, the Bolivian delegation said that Kosovo was an integral part of Serbia, that the Republic of Kosovo did not exist, and that a "unilateral declaration of independence cannot change the international regime established by the UNSC resolution, or decide the outcome of negotiations".

== See also ==
- Foreign relations of Bolivia
- Foreign relations of Kosovo
