= Kosovo–Suriname relations =

- Kosovo: Suriname

Kosovo–Suriname relations are foreign relations between Kosovo and Suriname.

== History ==
Kosovo declared its independence from Serbia on 17 February 2008. On 8 July 2016, Suriname officially recognized Kosovo as an independent and sovereign state.

On 27 October 2017, the Serbian Foreign Minister at the time, Ivica Dačić, claimed that the recognition was withdrawn on 27 October 2017. On 10 June 2022, Kosovo's Foreign Minister Donika Gërvalla-Schwarz met with her Surinamese counterpart Albert Ramdin, where, according to Kosovo, they talked about enhancing the cooperation between the two countries. However, during his visit to Belgrade in July 2023, minister Ramdin said that his country supports Serbian territorial integrity.

== See also ==
- Foreign relations of Kosovo
- Foreign relations of Suriname
