= South Africa's reaction to the 2008 Kosovo declaration of independence =

Following Kosovo's declaration of independence in 2008, South Africa as a non-permanent member of the UNSC that year called for further negotiation between the government of Serbia and the Assembly of Kosovo. At a press conference on 19 February 2008, a spokesman from South Africa's Department for Foreign Affairs stated that the South African "government will be studying... the political and legal implications of this new development", that "there is no way South Africa can consciously not want to take a position on this. But you can only take a position in a matter that is not ongoing... It's a question of time before South Africa takes a definite position", and that "it's not a question of us being in the majority or minority, as it has never been. It's not a question of us being with Russia or China and it has never been and it will never be. We've got our own principles that guide us".

On 9 May 2009, Serbian Foreign Minister Vuk Jeremić met the new South African President Jacob Zuma and other officials. Afterwards, Jeremić said, "Serbia is grateful for the support and consistency of the Republic of South Africa not to recognize Kosovo's self-proclaimed independence".

In a 30 August 2010 meeting with Vuk Jeremić, South African International Relations and Cooperation Minister Maite Nkoana-Mashabane confirmed that her country will not change its decision not to recognise Kosovo.

In a 7 June 2011 interview for Radio Dukagjini, South Africa's Department of Foreign Affairs spokesman, Clayson Monyela, said that South Africa will not recognise Kosovo.

== See also ==
- South Africa–Serbia relations
- International recognition of Kosovo
- Foreign relations of Kosovo
- 2008 Kosovo declaration of independence
