= Jordan–Kosovo relations =

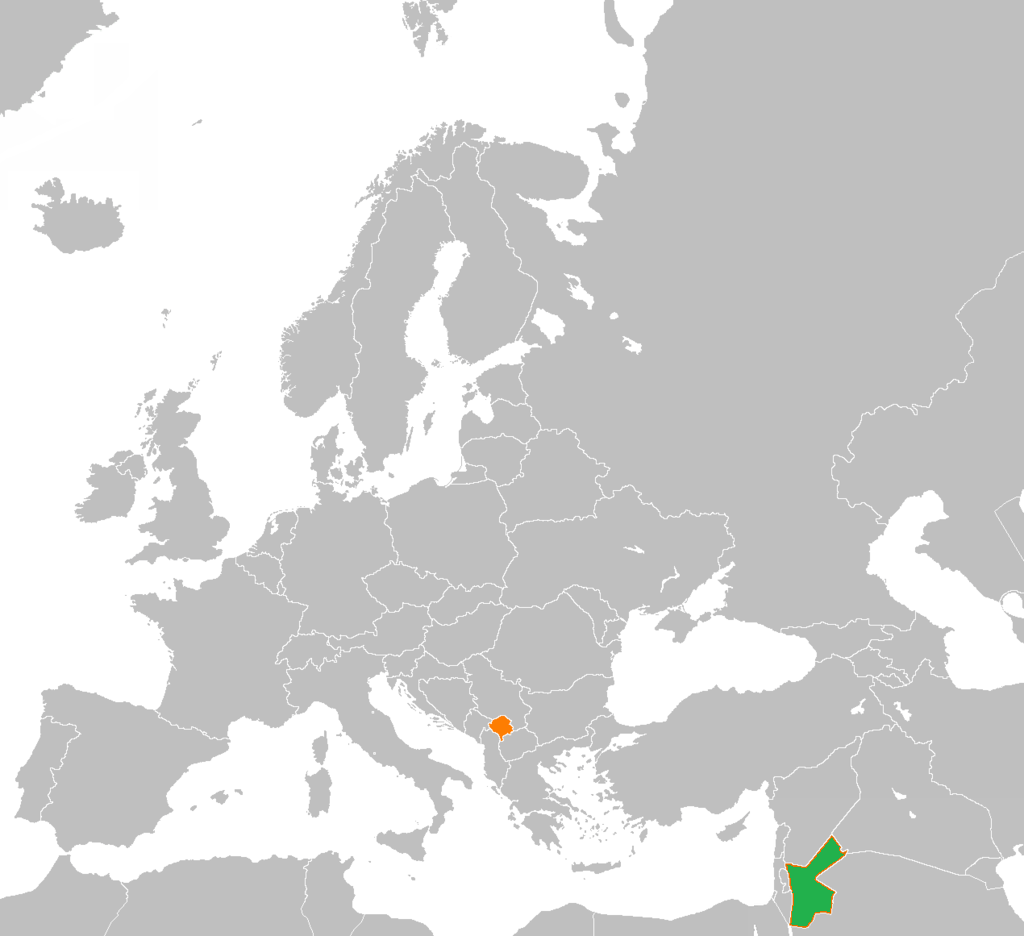

- Jordan: Kosovo

Jordan–Kosovo relations are foreign relations between Jordan and Kosovo. Kosovo declared its independence from Serbia on 17 February 2008 and Jordan recognized it on 7 July 2009. The two countries enjoy good and friendly relations. Atifete Jahjaga who served as the fourth President of Kosovo praised Jordan's assistance as one of the most important partnerships of Kosovo in the Middle East. King Abdullah II of Jordan praised the relations between the two countries declaring that his country's support for Kosovo will continue. He added that the Hashemite Kingdom will increase its foreign policy efforts to support Kosovo in the process of recognition.

== History ==
During the Kosovo War, Jordan showed its support for NATO intervention in Kosovo and withdrew its ambassador from Belgrade. In December 2009 Jordan supported Kosovo at the International Court of Justice's advisory opinion on Kosovo's declaration of independence. Prince Zeid bin Ra'ad raised the points:

- The authorities in Belgrade, guided by nationalistic intentions since 1989, denied the people of Kosovo the right to self-government and participation in government by systematic repression.
- The UNSC Resolution 1244 was adopted in order to end violence by the withdrawal of Serbian forces, and excluded the possibility that Kosovo would ever again become part of Serbia.
- The declaration of independence was exercised as a last resort, after all negotiating avenues were exhausted.

Jordan and Kosovo established full diplomatic relations on 5 June 2013.
