= Guatemala–Kosovo relations =

Guatemalan–Kosovar relations
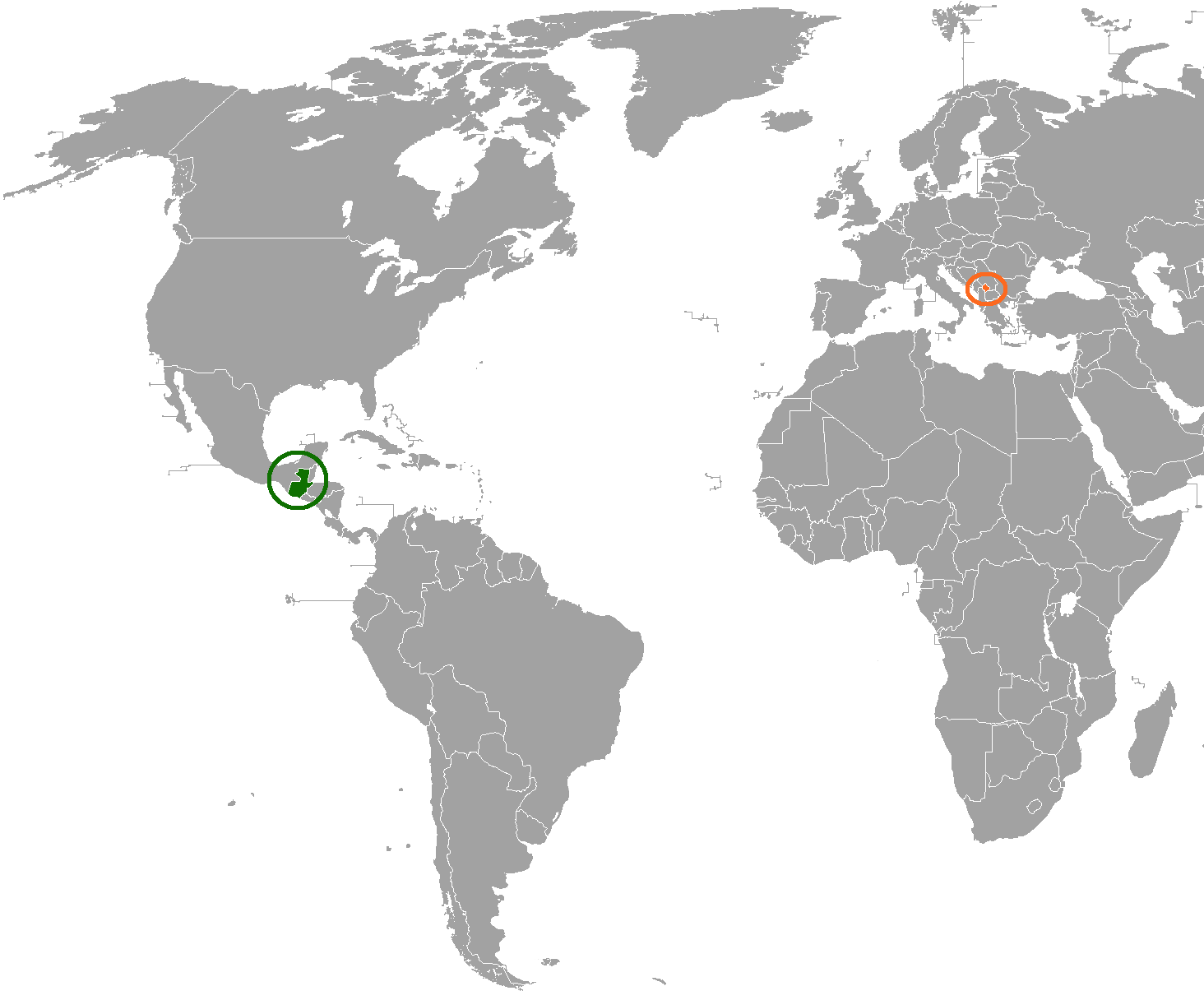
- Guatemala: Kosovo

Formal diplomatic relations between Guatemala and Kosovo have not been established as Guatemala has not recognized Kosovo as a sovereign state.

== History ==
In March 2008, the Guatemalan Foreign Minister, Haroldo Rodas, said that he had objected to the recognition of Kosovo in deference to Russian concerns. However, the government was still considering recognising Kosovo.

At a meeting on 26 March 2009 with Kosovo's Foreign Minister, Skënder Hyseni, the Ambassador of Guatemala to the United Nations, Gert Rosenthal, said that his country's government was carefully studying the developments in Kosovo, and the preparations to present a case to the International Court of Justice. He also said that Guatemala was working with others in Latin America to reach a decision.

In April 2014, Guatemalan President Otto Pérez Molina said that his country would consider recognising Kosovo.

== See also ==
- Foreign relations of Guatemala
- Foreign relations of Kosovo
