= Ecuador–Kosovo relations =

Ecuadorian–Kosovar relations
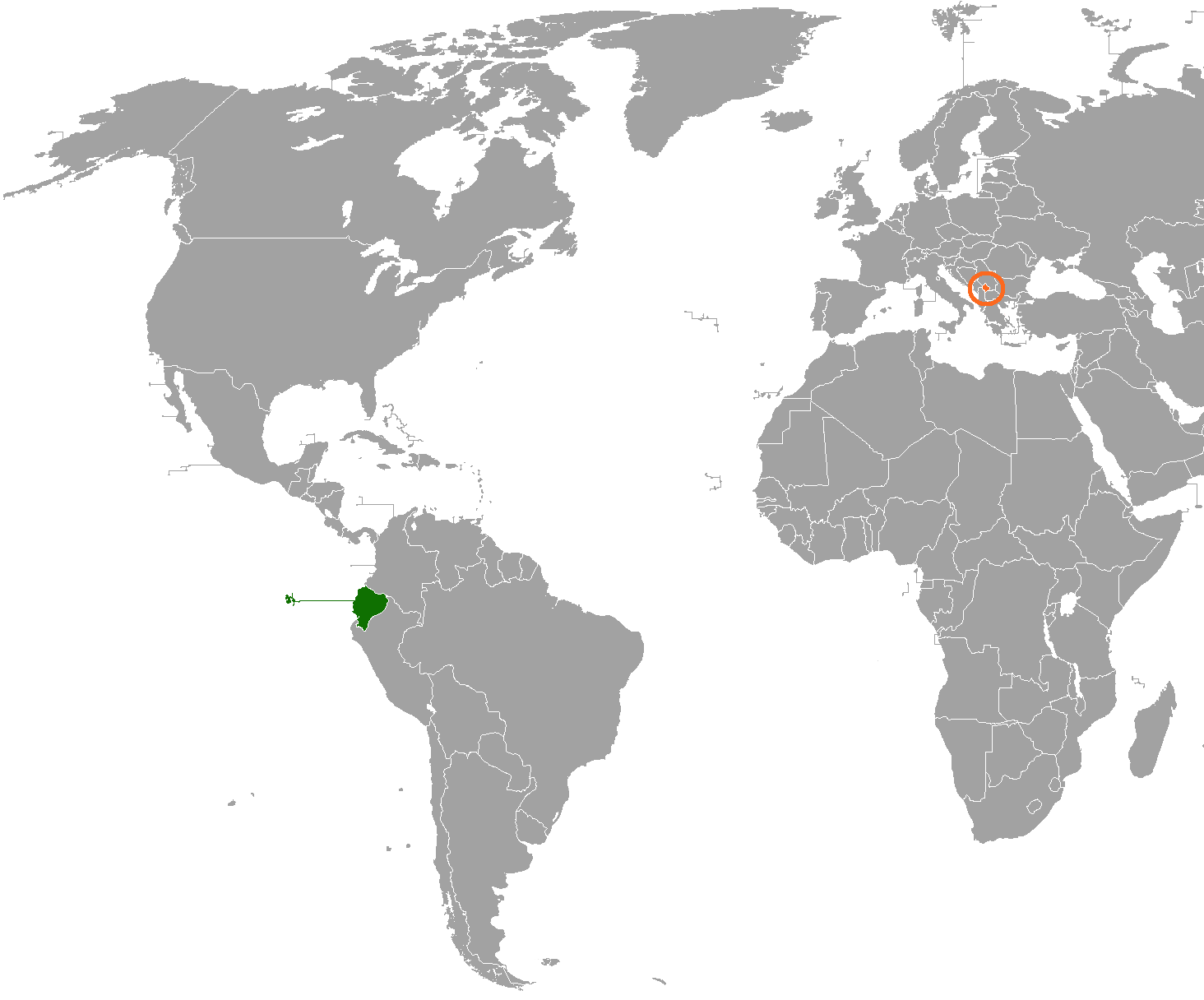
- Ecuador: Kosovo

Ecuador–Kosovo relations are foreign relations between Ecuador and Kosovo. Formal diplomatic relations between two states are non-existent as Ecuador does not recognize Kosovo as a sovereign state.

== History ==
In response to a request from the University of Oxford regarding the analysis of developments related to the independence of Kosovo, in August 2008 the Ecuadorian Foreign Ministry stated that there should be "unrestricted compliance with the rules and principles of the United Nations Charter and International Law".

At a meeting in January 2009 with Kosovo's Foreign Minister, Skënder Hyseni, Ecuador's Ambassador to Austria, María Elena Moreira, reportedly said that the government of her country has carefully followed developments in Kosovo, and taking into account the recognition of Kosovo by European and Latin American countries, and that Ecuador would consider seriously the request for recognition of Kosovo as an independent and sovereign country. At a meeting on 25 March 2009 with Hyseni, the Ambassador of Ecuador to the United Nations, Diego Morejón-Pazmino, reportedly said that Ecuador had been carefully following developments in Kosovo, and stressed the importance of building democratic institutions and a society with rights guaranteed to all communities. Morejón-Pazmino also said that Ecuador would carefully examine developments before making a decision on whether to recognise Kosovo.

== See also ==
- Foreign relations of Ecuador
- Foreign relations of Kosovo
