= Kosovo–Sri Lanka relations =

Kosovar–Sri Lankan relations
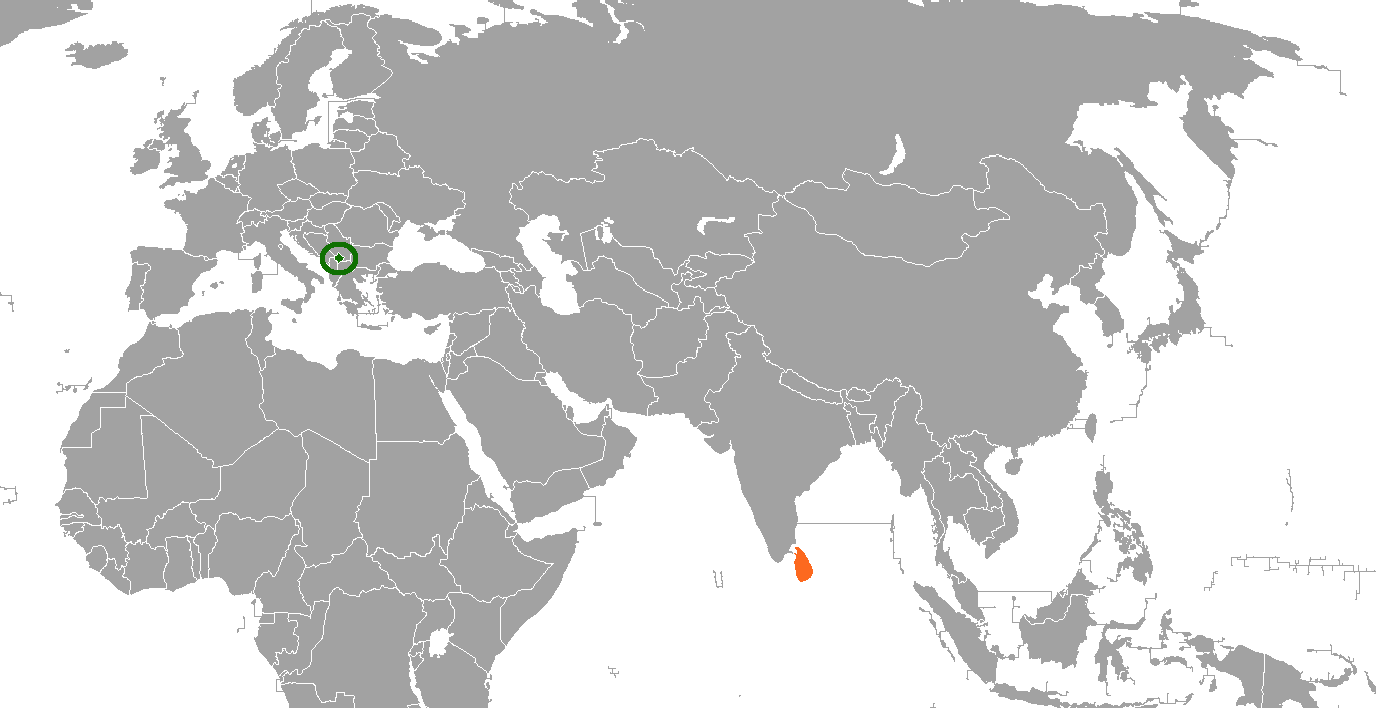

- Kosovo: Sri Lanka

Kosovar–Sri Lankan relations are foreign relations between Kosovo and Sri Lanka. There are no formal diplomatic relations between two states as Sri Lanka has not recognized Kosovo as a sovereign state.

== History ==
In February 2008, the Foreign Ministry of Sri Lanka called Kosovo's declaration of independence a violation of the United Nations Charter and emphasised its concern that the act "could set an unmanageable precedent in the conduct of international relations, the established global order of sovereign States and could thus pose a grave threat to international peace and security".

In a June 2009 meeting with Serbian president Boris Tadić, Sri Lankan president Mahinda Rajapaksa re-affirmed his country's solidarity with Serbia and stated that Sri Lanka remained firmly opposed to Kosovo's independence as it threatened the international order. Rajapaksa said that there could be no right for countries to be formed by secession, which was in violation of the UN Charter and the principles of national sovereignty.

In a September 2011 meeting with Kosovo's First deputy prime minister Behgjet Pacolli, Rajapaksa promised that Sri Lanka will continue to cooperate and expressed his willingness to continue contacts which would lead to the construction of interstate relations in the future. In February 2013, the Prime Minister of Sri Lanka, D. M. Jayaratne, stated that the recognition of Kosovo by Sri Lanka will be reviewed.

== See also ==
- Foreign relations of Kosovo
- Foreign relations of Sri Lanka
