= Georgia–Kosovo relations =

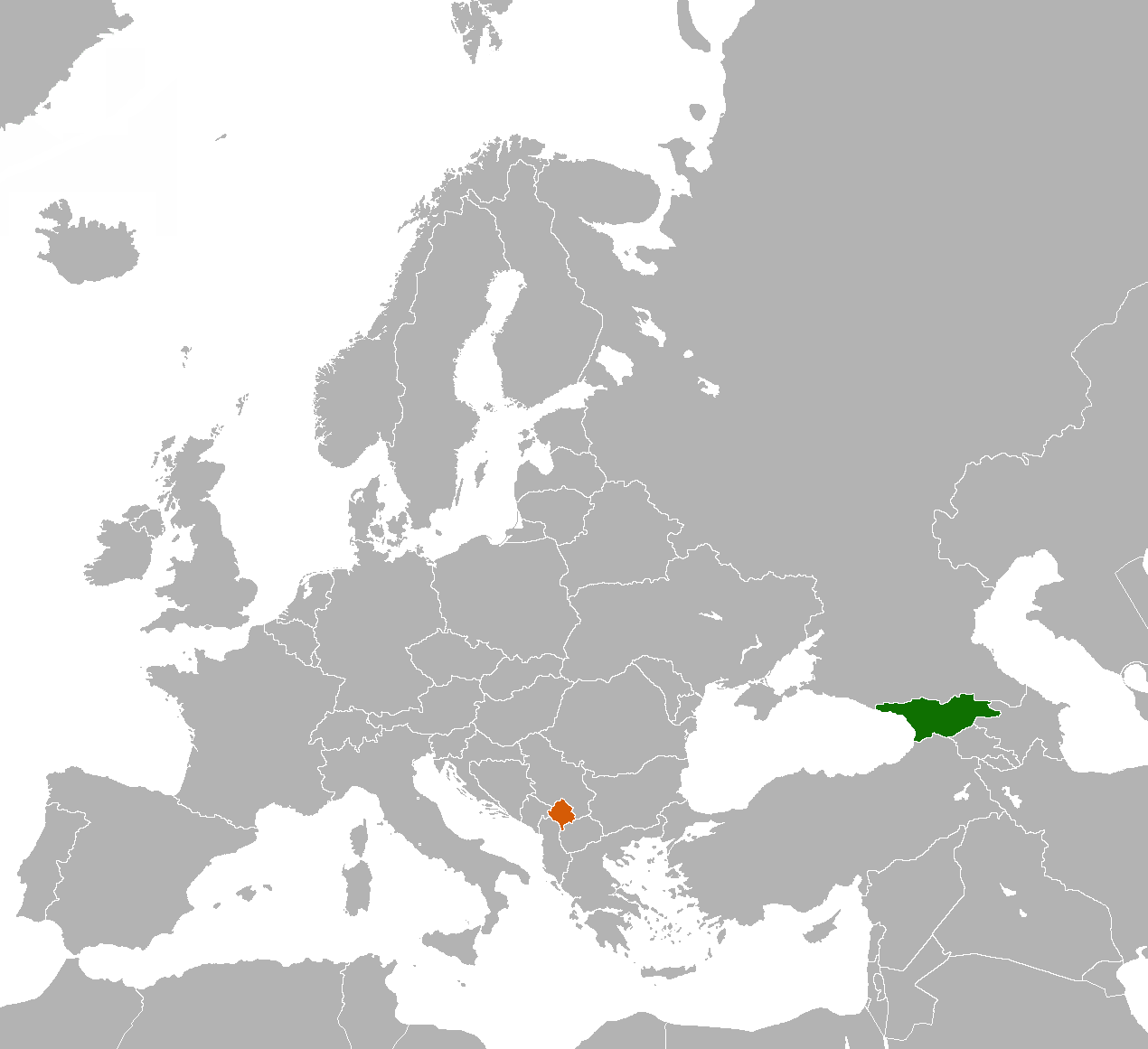
- Georgia: Kosovo

Georgia–Kosovo relations are foreign relations between Georgia and Kosovo. There are no formal diplomatic relations between two states as Georgia has not recognized Kosovo as a sovereign state.

== History ==
The Foreign Minister of Georgia, David Bakradze, said on 18 February 2008 that Tbilisi would not recognise Kosovo's independence, adding: "I think everyone in Georgia, regardless of political orientation, is unanimous on this". On 29 March 2008 the prime minister, Lado Gurgenidze, gave a recorded interview in Estonia, in which he clearly said in English that as Georgia's friends have recognised Kosovo, it is only natural that eventually Georgia will do likewise. The printed publication of the interview elicited demands by the opposition to impeach him, and the government spokesman stated that the prime minister was misinterpreted, after which the Estonian paper Postimees, which conducted and printed the interview, released the audio to the world. On 9 May 2008 President of Georgia, Mikheil Saakashvili, said "We are saying loud and clear that we have never planned to recognize Kosovo. Nor do we plan to do so in the future. The way out of the situation that has been chosen is not the best one. The Serbs should have been given more time for negotiations. The solution for Kosovo was a hasty one".

== See also ==
- Foreign relations of Georgia
- Foreign relations of Kosovo
- Georgia–Serbia relations
