= Azerbaijan–Kosovo relations =

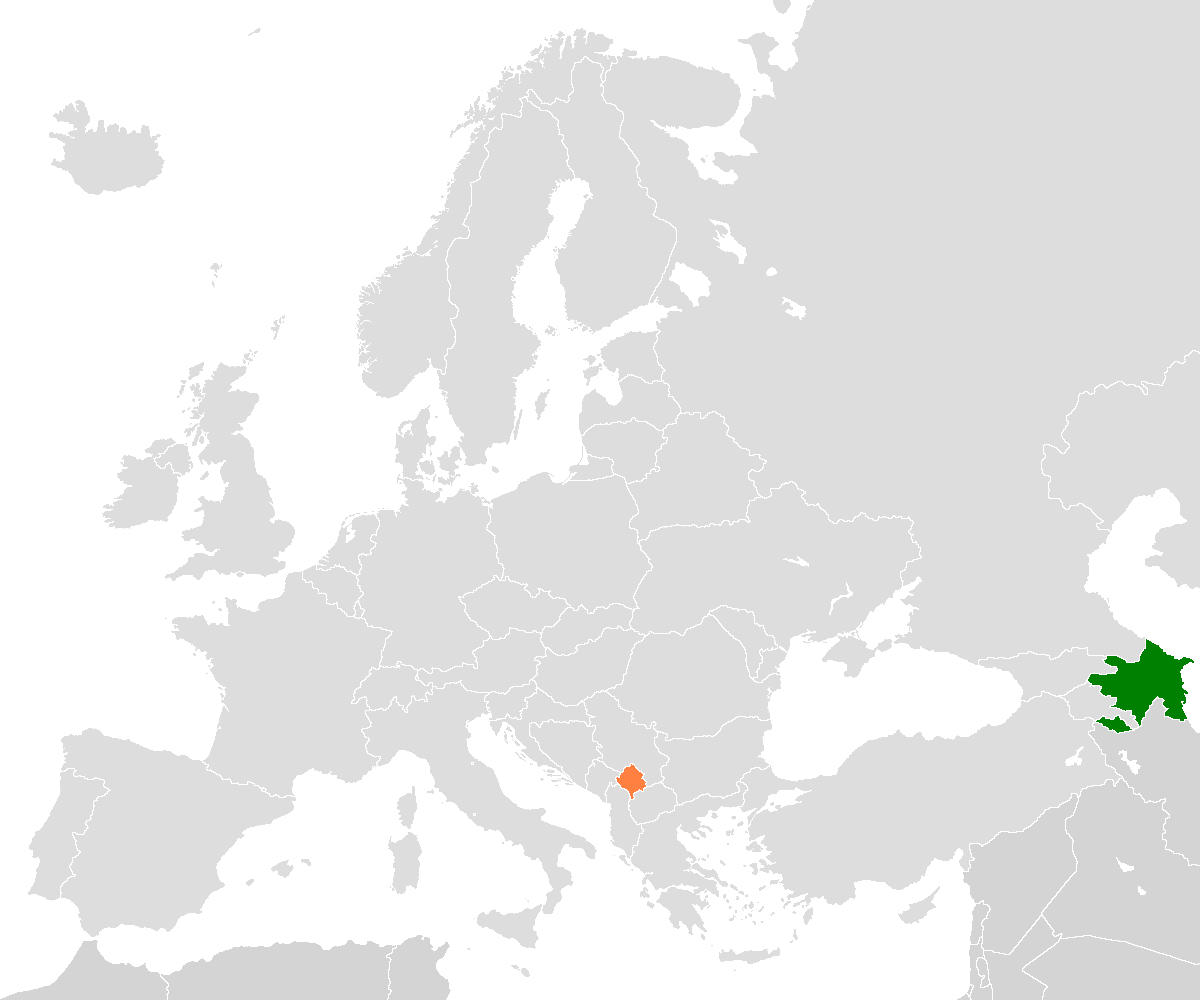

- Azerbaijan: Kosovo

Azerbaijan–Kosovo relations are the foreign relations between the Republic of Azerbaijan and the Republic of Kosovo. There are no formal diplomatic relations between the two states as Azerbaijan has not recognized Kosovo as a sovereign state.

== History ==
In February 2008, a spokesman for the Foreign Ministry of Azerbaijan, Khazar Ibrahim, said of potential Kosovan independence: "We view this illegal act as being in contradiction with international law. Proceeding from this, Azerbaijan's position is clear: it does not recognise [Kosovo's] independence". Azerbaijan also withdrew its peacekeepers from Kosovo. Zahid Oruj, a member of the parliamentary committee on defence and security, explained it by saying "Owing to the change of situation in Kosovo, the Azeri peacekeeping battalion performing its mission within the Turkish contingent will be withdrawn. Azerbaijan acts in compliance with the country's political stance". At the summit of the OIC on 10 March 2008, Azerbaijan opposed adoption of the document, proposed by Turkey, that would lend support to Kosovo's declaration of independence. On 19 June 2008, during the meeting of OIC, Azerbaijan was among countries that opposed the recognition of Kosovo as an independent country.

In a 3 December 2009 hearing at the International Court of Justice, the Azerbaijani delegation said that entities that declare secession while violating the internal laws of the state can not be considered to be states, and that a fait accompli may not be accepted – power is not the right, and the force is not the law.

At a meeting with Serbian president Boris Tadić in Baku in May 2010, President of Azerbaijan Ilham Aliyev said that Serbia and Azerbaijan mutually help each other in the international arena and that his country provides strong support for the territorial integrity of Serbia. He called the unilaterally proclaimed independence of Kosovo an illegal move and called on all UN member states to respect international law. In April 2023, Azerbaijan along with Cyprus, Georgia, Hungary, Romania, Serbia and Spain voted against approving Kosovo's membership in the Council of Europe.

== See also ==
- Foreign relations of Azerbaijan
- Foreign relations of Kosovo
- Azerbaijan–Serbia relations
