= Cameroon–Kosovo relations =

Cameroonian–Kosovar relations
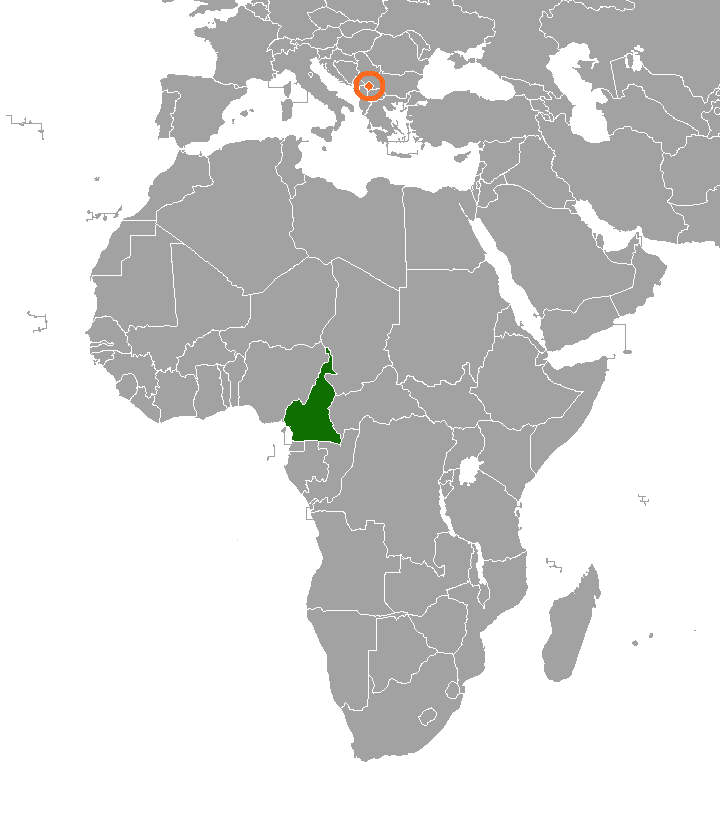
- Cameroon: Kosovo

Cameroonian–Kosovar relations are foreign relations between Cameroon and Kosovo. Formal diplomatic relations between two states do not exist as Cameroon has not recognized Kosovo as a sovereign state.

== History ==
In January 2011, the General Secretary of Cameroon's Ministry of Foreign Affairs, Ferdinand Ngoh Ngoh, reportedly said that his government could not deny that Kosovo's independence was irreversible, but that it would have to be careful on how to proceed in order not to create a situation that would damage Cameroon's interests and position in the world.

In November 2011, in a meeting with First Deputy Prime Minister of Kosovo, Behgjet Pacolli, Cameroon's prime minister, Philémon Yang, reportedly said that the recognition of Kosovo was underway.

In a 15 November 2012 meeting with Kosovo's Foreign Minister, Enver Hoxhaj, the Minister Delegate of Cameroon's Ministry of Foreign Affairs, Adoum Gargoum, said that his country has no political or legal reasons not to recognise Kosovo's independence, expressing the sympathy of his people for the people of Kosovo.

In 2018, Cameroon was one of 51 countries to vote against Kosovo's bid to joint Interpol, effectively blocking it from becoming a member country of the organization.

== See also ==
- Foreign relations of Cameroon
- Foreign relations of Kosovo
