= Kosovo–Sudan relations =

- Kosovo: Sudan

Kosovo–Sudan relations are foreign relations between Kosovo and Sudan. Sudan officially recognized Kosovo as an independent state in April 2025.

== Relations under the al-Nigaz regime ==
After Kosovo declared its independence from Serbia on 17 February 2008, during the summit of the Organization for Islamic Cooperation on 10 March 2008, Sudan, under the Omar al-Bashir regime, opposed adoption of the document, proposed by Turkey, that would lend support to Kosovo's declaration of independence. On 28 August 2008, Sudan's envoy to the UN Abdelmahmood Abdelhaleem stated that his government remains opposed to the independence of Kosovo.

== Post-Bashir relations after 2019 ==
On 12 April 2025, Sudan officially recognized the Republic of Kosovo as an independent and sovereign state with the decision of the Transitional Sovereignty Council being conveyed by Sudanese foreign minister Ali Youssif to Kosovo's president Vjosa Osmani at the 2025 Antalya Diplomacy Forum. The recognition of Kosovo took place six years after the fall of Omar al-Bashir in 2019.

== See also ==
- Foreign relations of Kosovo
- Foreign relations of Sudan
