= Cuba–Kosovo relations =

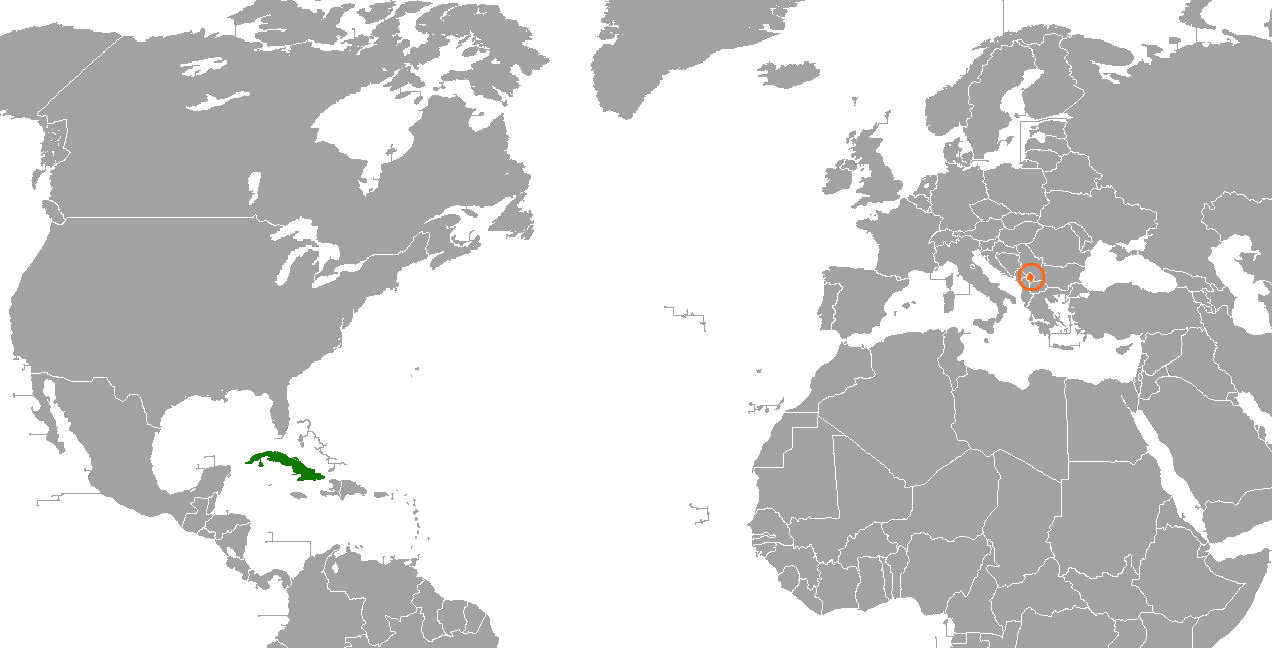

- Cuba: Kosovo

Cuba–Kosovo relations are foreign relations between Cuba and Kosovo. Formal diplomatic relations between two states are non-existent as Cuba does not recognize Kosovo as a sovereign state.

== History ==
Cuba has supported Serbia in its stance towards Kosovo, considering Kosovo independence an "illegitimate act" and a "violation of norms of international law and principles of the United Nations Charter".

On 29 February 2008, writing in his personal "Reflections of Fidel" column, which was published in the official newspaper of the Communist Party of Cuba, Granma Internacional, Fidel Castro accused Javier Solana of being the ideological father of Kosovo's "independence" (Castro's quotes) and, by doing so, of putting at risk the ethnic cohesion and the very state integrity of Spain or the United Kingdom, both of which experienced separatist movements of their own.

In December 2009, Ambassador of Cuba to Serbia, Mercedes Martínez Valdés, reportedly said that Cuba supported the "territorial integrity and sovereignty of Serbia" regarding the issue of Kosovo and "advocated for the respect of international law".

== See also ==
- Foreign relations of Cuba
- Foreign relations of Kosovo
- Cuba–Serbia relations
