= Brazil–Kosovo relations =

Brazilian–Kosovar relations
- Brazil: Kosovo

Brazilian–Kosovar relations are foreign relations between Brazil and Kosovo.

== History ==
Brazil has not recognized the independence of Kosovo, stating that it believes that an agreement should be reached under the auspices of the UN and the legal framework of UNSCR 1244.

In February 2008, the Brazilian government reaffirmed its belief that a peaceful solution for the issue of Kosovo must continue to be sought through dialogue and negotiation, under the auspices of the UN and the legal framework of UNSCR 1244. Then Foreign Minister Celso Amorim defended that Brazil should await a UNSC decision before defining its official position on the matter of Kosovo's independence.

In September 2009, Ambassador of Brazil to Serbia Dante Coelho de Lima said that "Our fundamental position is that we respect Serbia's territorial integrity. We supported Security Council resolution 1244, under which Kosovo is a part of Serbia. We also think that the principle of self-determination should not run counter to respect for international law".

In a 4 December 2009 hearing at the ICJ, the Brazilian delegation said that the unilateral declaration of independence ignored not only the authority of the UNSC, but also the principle of protecting the territorial integrity of states, that there was "no basis to justify the unilateral declaration of independence in the UNSC resolution 1244 because it predicted a solution agreed by both parties", and that since such an agreement was not reached, the Kosovo dispute could be decided only by the UNSC.

In 2015, Atifete Jahjaga, then president of Kosovo, cancelled a visit to Brazil, where she was to participate in the Global Summit of Women in São Paulo. The reason for the cancellation was her refusal to accept an entry visa to the country, which listed her nationality as "Serbian".

== See also ==
- Foreign relations of Brazil
- Foreign relations of Kosovo
- Brazil–Serbia relations
- International recognition of Kosovo
