= Kosovo–Mozambique relations =

Kosovar–Mozambican relations
- Kosovo: Mozambique

Kosovar–Mozambican relations are foreign relations between and Kosovo and Mozambique.

== History ==
In February 2008, Mozambican Deputy Foreign Minister Henrique Banze said in reference to Kosovo's declaration of independence, "We shall wait for the appropriate moment. It's a very sensitive matter and like all matters of this kind, it demands a lot of thought. Our government will work so that it may make the most appropriate decision in this case". In November 2008 Mozambique's ambassador to the UN, Filipe Chidumo, stated that his government is monitoring developments, and that it "understands Kosovo's people's will for freedom and independence".

At a meeting on 18 June 2009 with Kosovo's Foreign Minister, Skënder Hyseni, Ambassador Chidumo reportedly said that the issue of Kosovo continues to remain on Mozambique's agenda and that he would resubmit the request for recognition to his government.

In September 2012, Mozambique's Minister for Foreign Affairs and Co-Operation, Oldemiro Julio Marques Baloi, said that his government would reconsider recognising Kosovo.

== See also ==
- Foreign relations of Kosovo
- Foreign relations of Mozambique
