= Kosovo–Mongolia relations =

- Kosovo: Mongolia

Kosovo–Mongolia relations are foreign relations between and Kosovo and Mongolia.

== History ==
On 8 May 2009, Kosovo's president Fatmir Sejdiu met Nyamaa Enkhbold, the Mongolian Deputy Parliament Speaker, to request Mongolia's recognition of Kosovo. Enkhbold reportedly promised to deal with the request once he had returned home.

== Required visa ==
For citizens of Mongolia who have the wish to enter the republic of Kosovo to visit or work, visa is needed.

== Cooperation in international organizations ==
Kosovo and Mongolia are joint members of several organizations. World Bank Kosovo has been a member since 29 June 2009 while Mongolia has been a member since 14 February 1991.

The Egmont Group of Financial Intelligence Units comprises various groups that oversee and/or contribute to its main operations and overall goal of strengthening information-sharing mechanisms among its members to combat money laundering, terrorist financing, and associated predicate crimes. Kosovo is a member since 1 February 2017 through the Financial Intelligence Unit, while Mongolia is a member since 28 May 2009 through the Financial Information Unit of Mongolia.

Another organization that both Mongolia and Kosovo participate together is the World Customs Organization. Kosovo won membership in this organization since 25 January 2017 meanwhile Mongolia has won membership since 17 September 1991.

== Sports organization ==
Kosovo and Mongolia participate in the same sport organization that we know as FIFA, with Kosovo being a member since 2016, and Mongolia being a member since 1998.

== See also ==
- Foreign relations of Kosovo
- Foreign relations of Mongolia
- Mongolia–Yugoslavia relations
