= Foreign relations of Timor-Leste =

After the referendum on independence on 30 August 1999, Timor-Leste became an independent nation on 20 May 2002 and began initiating diplomatic relations with the rest of the global community.

== Policy ==
The foreign policy of Timor-Leste has been defined by its position as a small state surrounded by two much larger powers. Rather than formally aligning with any particular state or bloc, Timor-Leste has sought a diverse set of positive relationships. Upon independence foreign policy was shaped by José Ramos-Horta, who has previously campaigned internationally for East Timorese independence. Ramos-Horta was a proponent of Internationalism, and held sway until 2012. Following elections in 2012, leaders such as Xanana Gusmão and Taur Matan Ruak pursued a slightly more nationalistic foreign policy.

Timor-Leste has pursued membership in a variety of multilateral forums, positioning itself as a reliable international actor. This promotion of international law is tied to the countries own security needs. Its broad global relations are shaped by its history, with its ties outside of its immediate region influenced by Catholicism, and by Portuguese colonial history. Regionally, its relations are influenced by cultural links to nearby regions, as well by the need to ensure security and independence in the light of the power imbalance between Timor-Leste and its neighbours, Australia and Indonesia. Upon independence, it sought membership of ASEAN, despite historical ASEAN support of the Indonesian position and cultural links with Melanesia that were part of the East Timorese identity.

== Diplomatic relations ==
List of countries which Timor-Leste maintains diplomatic relations with:

#	Country	Date
1	China	20 May 2002
2	Norway	20 May 2002
3	Thailand	20 May 2002
4	Algeria	20 May 2002
5	Angola	20 May 2002
6	Australia	20 May 2002
7	Brazil	20 May 2002
8	Brunei	20 May 2002
9	Colombia	20 May 2002
10	Cuba	20 May 2002
11	Czech Republic	20 May 2002
12	Germany	20 May 2002
13	Ghana	20 May 2002
14	Guinea-Bissau	20 May 2002
—	Holy See	20 May 2002
15	Israel	20 May 2002
16	Japan	20 May 2002
17	Malaysia	20 May 2002
18	Mozambique	20 May 2002
19	New Zealand	20 May 2002
20	Philippines	20 May 2002
21	Portugal	20 May 2002
22	Russia	20 May 2002
—	Sahrawi Arab Democratic Republic	20 May 2002
23	São Tomé and Príncipe	20 May 2002
24	Singapore	20 May 2002
25	South Korea	20 May 2002
26	Spain	20 May 2002
27	Sweden	20 May 2002
28	Turkey	20 May 2002
29	United States	20 May 2002
30	Canada	May 2002
31	Qatar	May 2002
32	Bangladesh	7 June 2002
33	Cyprus	20 June 2002
34	Finland	20 June 2002
35	Indonesia	2 July 2002
36	Papua New Guinea	22 July 2002
37	Vietnam	28 July 2002
38	Cambodia	29 July 2002
39	France	29 July 2002
40	Laos	29 July 2002
41	Palau	16 August 2002
42	Vanuatu	21 August 2002
43	Fiji	22 August 2002
44	Chile	16 September 2002
45	Switzerland	16 September 2002
46	Austria	20 September 2002
47	Peru	30 September 2002
48	Belgium	3 October 2002
49	Slovakia	17 October 2002
50	Argentina	11 October 2002
51	North Korea	5 November 2002
52	Poland	18 November 2002
53	Maldives	26 November 2002
54	Tonga	26 November 2002
55	Romania	20 December 2002
—	Cook Islands	2002
56	Italy	2002
57	Pakistan	2002
58	United Kingdom	2002
59	Bulgaria	21 January 2003
60	Hungary	21 January 2003
61	India	24 January 2003
62	Ireland	31 January 2003
63	South Africa	3 February 2003
64	Croatia	5 February 2003
65	Denmark	12 February 2003
66	Mauritius	20 March 2003
67	North Macedonia	25 March 2003
68	Slovenia	3 April 2003
69	Greece	4 April 2003
70	Belize	15 April 2003
71	Costa Rica	14 May 2003
72	Cameroon	20 May 2003
73	Malta	20 May 2003
74	El Salvador	23 May 2003
75	Mexico	26 September 2003
76	Ukraine	27 September 2003
77	Namibia	1 October 2003
78	Mongolia	28 October 2003
79	Iran	10 November 2003
80	Netherlands	17 November 2003
81	Iceland	4 December 2003
82	Kuwait	16 December 2003
83	Armenia	23 December 2003
—	State of Palestine	1 March 2004
84	Azerbaijan	5 April 2004
85	Samoa	27 July 2004
86	Nigeria	2004
87	Bosnia and Herzegovina	22 March 2005
88	Lebanon	April 2005
89	Tajikistan	4 October 2005
90	Venezuela	5 October 2005
91	Estonia	21 December 2005
92	Egypt	16 April 2006
—	Sovereign Military Order of Malta	18 September 2006
93	Myanmar	26 September 2006
94	Republic of the Congo	7 November 2006
95	Luxembourg	27 September 2007
96	Dominican Republic	24 October 2007
97	Nicaragua	2 November 2007
98	Uruguay	23 September 2008
99	United Arab Emirates	13 November 2009
100	Cape Verde	18 November 2009
101	Monaco	19 February 2010
102	Montenegro	24 September 2010
103	Ecuador	8 September 2011
104	Andorra	20 September 2011
105	San Marino	7 October 2011
106	South Sudan	13 October 2011
107	Solomon Islands	21 December 2011
108	Georgia	22 December 2011
109	Tuvalu	8 September 2012
110	Haiti	October 2012
111	Trinidad and Tobago	24 September 2013
112	Latvia	27 September 2013
113	Lithuania	27 September 2013
114	Jamaica	27 September 2014
115	Belarus	1 October 2014
116	Equatorial Guinea	2014
117	Saudi Arabia	29 January 2015
118	Marshall Islands	25 September 2019
119	Bahrain	27 September 2019
120	Dominica	15 November 2021
121	Serbia	20 December 2021
122	Nepal	11 February 2022
—	Kosovo	9 March 2022
123	Oman	30 March 2022
124	Sri Lanka	4 May 2022
125	Paraguay	18 September 2022
126	Panama	20 September 2022
127	Guatemala	3 April 2023
128	Benin	10 October 2023
129	Saint Lucia	8 November 2023
130	Bolivia	26 July 2024
131	Uganda	13 August 2024
132	Jordan	22 November 2024
133	Burundi	19 January 2026
134	Kenya	16 March 2026
135	Sierra Leone	14 April 2026
136	Moldova	14 May 2026
137	Kyrgyzstan	25 May 2026
138	Federated States of Micronesia	24 June 2026
139	Kazakhstan	24 September 2026

== Bilateral relations ==
Country	Formal Relations Began	Notes
Australia		See Australia–Timor-Leste relations
Brazil		See Brazil–Timor-Leste relations
China		See China–Timor-Leste relations
Georgia		Georgia is represented in Timor by its embassy in Jakarta.
India		See India–Timor-Leste relations Relations between Timor-Leste and India date back to the early modern period. Indian traders traveled to the island in search of sandalwood. Trade links increased after the Portuguese colonisation of Timor-Leste and portions of India. The Portuguese set up various garrisoned centres in India to carry out this trade, and all of Portugal's territories in Asia, including Timor-Leste, were governed by the Portuguese Viceroy in Goa. Portuguese-trained Goan missionaries arrived in Timor-Leste in the early 17th century, and were influential in spreading Catholicism in the country. Indians also traveled to Timor-Leste to serve as soldiers, colonial bureaucrats, and missionaries. Some Indians arrived in Timor-Leste in the late 19th century to work as migrant labour. A small community of Timorese nationals of Goan descent trace their heritage back to these previous generations of immigrants. India was the second country to recognize the independence of Timor-Leste. Minister of State for External Affairs Omar Abdullah led a high-level delegation representing India at Timor-Leste's Independence Day celebrations in May 2002. Abdullah presented letters of felicitations from the President, Prime Minister Atal Bihari Vajpayee and Foreign Minister. Diplomatic relations between the two countries was formally established on 24 January 2003. At the UN General Assembly in 2003, Timor-Leste Prime Minister Alkatiri announced his country's support for India's candidature for a permanent seat in the UN Security Council. India diplomats Kamlesh Sharma and Atul Khare served as the Special Representative of Secretary General (SRSG) in Timor-Leste until 2004 and 2009 respectively. India's DPR in New York was a member of the UN Security Council appointed team that visited Timor-Leste in November to assess the situation on the ground and seek feedback from the all parties regarding the withdrawal of the United Nations Integrated Mission in Timor-Leste (UNMIT)'s and the situation in the country post-withdrawal. Timor-Leste voted for India's candidature for a non-permanent seat during 2011–12. The country also supported the election of Poonam Khetrapal Singh for the post of Regional Director, South East Asia Regional office (SEARO), WHO in September 2013. Timor-Leste co-sponsored a resolution moved by India at the UN General Assembly in January 2015, to declare 21 June as International Yoga Day. Several high-level visits between officials of the two countries have taken place. East Timorese Vice Minister of Health Natalia D. Araujo visited Delhi to participate in the International Conference on Traditional Medicine for South East Asian Countries in February 2013, and is the first East Timorese government official to visit India. Finance Minister Emilia Pires visited India in May 2013 to attend the ADB Governors' Meeting. Hernani Coelho was the first East Timorese Foreign Minister to India. He arrived in the country on a two-day visit in 27–29 March 2016 and met with the Foreign Minister Sushma Swaraj, Minister of State (VKS) and the Minister of Health & Family Welfare. At the ASEAN-India Summit 2023 in Jakarta, Prime Minister Narendra Modi made an announcement that India will soon opening its new embassy in Timorese capital Dili.
Indonesia		See Indonesia–Timor-Leste relations Despite the traumatic past, relations with Indonesia are very good. Indonesia is by far the largest trading partner of Timor-Leste (Approximately 50% of imports, 2005) and is steadily increasing its share. The East Timor-Indonesia Boundary Committee meets to survey and delimit land boundary; and Indonesia is seeking resolution of East Timorese refugees in Indonesia.
Israel		See Israel–Timor-Leste relations
Japan		See Japan–Timor-Leste relations: Timor-Leste has an embassy in Tokyo.; Japan has an embassy in Dili.
Kosovo	10 March 2022	See Kosovo–Timor-Leste relations Timor-Leste recognised the independence of Kosovo on 20 September 2012. The two countries established diplomatic relations on 10 March 2022.
Malaysia		See Malaysia–Timor-Leste relations Malaysia has contributed to many UN peacekeeping missions on the country, such as one are the Operation Astute during the 2006 East Timorese crisis. Malaysia also has provided assistance to Timor-Leste in the area of human resources development through various training programmes and providing assistance to Timor-Leste in its nation building efforts. Currently, Malaysia has been consider by East Timorese as a model to develop their countries. Timor-Leste has an embassy in Kuala Lumpur, and Malaysia has an embassy in Dili.
Mexico	26 September 2003	See Mexico–Timor-Leste relations: Timor-Leste is accredited to Mexico from its embassy in Washington, D.C., United States.; Mexico is accredited to Timor-Leste from its embassy in Jakarta, Indonesia.
Philippines		See Philippines–Timor-Leste relations On 6 June 2013, both countries signed three agreements in Manila concerning infrastructure development, defence and education.
Portugal		See Portugal–Timor-Leste relations Timor-Leste was a colony of Portugal for over 400 years. As a former Portuguese colony, Timor-Leste has a significant proportion of Portuguese speakers. Portuguese is one of the two official languages of Timor and it is a full member of the Community of Portuguese Language Countries. From 1986, Portugal started to make the self-determination of Timor-Leste a major concern of its diplomatic policy, at a time when the occupation of this country by Indonesia was still a matter forgotten by the international community. The diplomatic efforts from Portugal were able to achieve a growing international support, including from countries, as Australia and the US, that hitherto implicitly supported the Indonesian occupation. This efforts would eventually lead to a referendum and the independence of Timor-Leste in 2002. Other ties include connections between the National University of Timor-Leste and Coimbra University, and between the military forces of Timor-Leste and Portugal. Timor-Leste opened its first Embassy abroad in Lisbon on 5 July 2002: Timor-Leste has an embassy in Lisbon.
Russia		See Russia–Timor-Leste relations Russia was one of the first countries to recognise Timor-Leste's independence and took part in nearly all UN aid programs, providing food and relief personnel, including civil and transport aviation pilots.
Serbia		Serbia is represented in Timor by its embassy in Jakarta.
Singapore	20 May 2002	Both countries established diplomatic relations on May 20, 2002. The Democratic Republic of Timor-Leste set up an embassy in Singapore on 1 December 2010 During a meeting with his Timorese counterpart, Bendito dos Santos Freitas on July 24, 2023, Singapore FM Dr Vivian Balakrishnan officially announced to open embassy in Dili.
South Korea		In 2023, around 3,700 East Timorese worked in South Korea. There are plans to increase cooperation between South Korea's island province of Jeju with Timor-Leste's island municipality Atauro.
Turkey		See Timor-Leste–Turkey relations Turkey is represented in Timor by its embassy in Jakarta.
United Kingdom	2002	See Timor-Leste–United Kingdom relations Timor-Leste established diplomatic relations with the United Kingdom on 2002.: Timor-Leste maintains an embassy in London.; The United Kingdom is accredited to Timor-Leste from its embassy in Jakarta; there is no British embassy in Timor-Leste. On 29 February 2024, the UK announced its intentions to re-open an embassy in Dili.; The United Kingdom committed its support for the accession of Timor-Leste to ASEAN.
United States		See Timor-Leste–United States relations The United States has a large bilateral development assistance program, $20.6 million in 2007, and also contributes funds as a major member of a number of multilateral agencies such as the Asian Development Bank and the World Bank. The US Peace Corps has operated in Timor-Leste since 2002, but it suspended operations in May 2006 due to unrest and instability.: Timor-Leste has an embassy in Washington, D.C.; United States has an embassy in Dili.
Vietnam	28 July 2002	Vietnam has an embassy in Dili.; Timor-Leste has an embassy in Hanoi.

== Multilateral relations ==
=== Association of Southeast Asian Nations ===
Timor-Leste was one of the only countries in Southeast Asia that was not a member of Association of Southeast Asian Nations (ASEAN). However, Timor-Leste expressed its intention of gaining observer status to ASEAN in July 2002 and in 2006 it was considered to take six years to join. However, Timor-Leste attended many meetings of ASEAN regardless. In 2007 Timor-Leste signed the ASEAN Treaty on Amity and Co-operation. On October 26, 2025, Timor-Leste became the 11th member state of ASEAN with the signing of the Declaration on the Admission of Timor-Leste into ASEAN.

== See also ==
- Foreign aid to Timor-Leste
- List of diplomatic missions in Timor-Leste
- List of diplomatic missions of Timor-Leste

== Literature ==
- Sahin, Selver B. (2014). "Timor-Leste's Foreign Policy: Securing State Identity in the Post-Independence Period". Journal of Current Southeast Asian Affairs. 33 (2): 3–25. doi:10.1177/186810341403300201. hdl:11693/12429. S2CID 54546263.
