= Neuss I =

Federal electoral district of Germany

107 Neuss I
- Electoral district for the Bundestag
- Neuss I in 2025
- State: North Rhine-Westphalia
- Population: 295,300 (2019)
- Electorate: 213,250 (2021)
- Major settlements: Neuss; Dormagen; Grevenbroich
- Area: 347.5 km^{2}

Current electoral district
- Created: 1949
- Party: CDU
- Member: Carl-Philipp Sassenrath
- Elected: 2025

Neuss I is an electoral constituency (German: Wahlkreis) represented in the Bundestag. It elects one member via first-past-the-post voting. Under the current constituency numbering system, it is designated as constituency 107. It is located in western North Rhine-Westphalia, comprising the southeastern part of the district of Rhein-Kreis Neuss.

Neuss I was created for the inaugural 1949 federal election. From 2005 to 2025, it was represented by Hermann Gröhe of the Christian Democratic Union (CDU). Since 2025 it has been represented by Carl-Philipp Sassenrath of the CDU.

== Geography ==
Neuss I is located in western North Rhine-Westphalia. As of the 2021 federal election, it comprised the municipalities of Dormagen, Grevenbroich, Neuss, and Rommerskirchen from the Rhein-Kreis Neuss district.

== History ==
Neuss I was created in 1949, then known as Neuss-Grevenbroich. In the 1965 through 1976 elections, it was named Neuss-Grevenbroich I. It acquired its current name in the 1980 election. In the 1949 election, it was North Rhine-Westphalia constituency 21 in the numbering system. From 1953 through 1961, it was number 80. From 1965 through 1976, it was number 77. From 1980 through 1998, it was number 76. From 2002 through 2009, it was number 109. In the 2013 through 2021 elections, it was number 108. Since the 2025 election, it has been number 107.

Originally, the constituency comprised the independent city of Neuss and the district of Grevenbroich. From 1965 through 1976, it comprised the independent city of Neuss and the municipalities of Dormagen, Kaarst, Korschenbroich, and Meerbusch from Grevenbroich district. From 1980 through 1998, it comprised the municipalities of Neuss and Dormagen from Rhein-Kreis Neuss. It acquired its current borders in the 2002 election.

Election	No.	Name	Borders
1949	21	Neuss-Grevenbroich	Neuss city; Grevenbroich district
1953	80	Neuss-Grevenbroich	Neuss city; Grevenbroich district
1957	80	Neuss-Grevenbroich	Neuss city; Grevenbroich district
1961	80	Neuss-Grevenbroich	Neuss city; Grevenbroich district
1965	77	Neuss-Grevenbroich I	Neuss city; Grevenbroich district (only Dormagen, Kaarst, Korschenbroich, and Meerbusch municipalities)
1969	77	Neuss-Grevenbroich I	Neuss city; Grevenbroich district (only Dormagen, Kaarst, Korschenbroich, and Meerbusch municipalities)
1972	77	Neuss-Grevenbroich I	Neuss city; Grevenbroich district (only Dormagen, Kaarst, Korschenbroich, and Meerbusch municipalities)
1976	77	Neuss-Grevenbroich I	Neuss city; Grevenbroich district (only Dormagen, Kaarst, Korschenbroich, and Meerbusch municipalities)
1980	76	Neuss I	Rhein-Kreis Neuss district (only Neuss and Dormagen municipalities)
1983	76	Neuss I	Rhein-Kreis Neuss district (only Neuss and Dormagen municipalities)
1987	76	Neuss I	Rhein-Kreis Neuss district (only Neuss and Dormagen municipalities)
1990	76	Neuss I	Rhein-Kreis Neuss district (only Neuss and Dormagen municipalities)
1994	76	Neuss I	Rhein-Kreis Neuss district (only Neuss and Dormagen municipalities)
1998	76	Neuss I	Rhein-Kreis Neuss district (only Neuss and Dormagen municipalities)
2002	109	Neuss I	Rhein-Kreis Neuss district (only Dormagen, Grevenbroich, Neuss, and Rommerskirchen municipalities)
2005	109	Neuss I	Rhein-Kreis Neuss district (only Dormagen, Grevenbroich, Neuss, and Rommerskirchen municipalities)
2009	109	Neuss I	Rhein-Kreis Neuss district (only Dormagen, Grevenbroich, Neuss, and Rommerskirchen municipalities)
2013	108	Neuss I	Rhein-Kreis Neuss district (only Dormagen, Grevenbroich, Neuss, and Rommerskirchen municipalities)
2017	108	Neuss I	Rhein-Kreis Neuss district (only Dormagen, Grevenbroich, Neuss, and Rommerskirchen municipalities)
2021	108	Neuss I	Rhein-Kreis Neuss district (only Dormagen, Grevenbroich, Neuss, and Rommerskirchen municipalities)
2025	107	Neuss I	Rhein-Kreis Neuss district (only Dormagen, Grevenbroich, Neuss, and Rommerskirchen municipalities)

== Members ==
The constituency has been held by the Christian Democratic Union (CDU) during all but one Bundestag term since 1949. It was first represented by Richard Muckermann from 1949 to 1961. He was succeeded by Josef Rommerskirchen from 1965 to 1976, followed by Heinz Günther Hüsch until 1990. Bertold Mathias Reinartz served two terms from 1990 to 1998. Hermann Gröhe was then elected in 1998, but defeated in 2002 by Kurt Bodewig of the Social Democratic Party (SPD). Hermann Gröhe regained the constituency in 2005, and was re-elected in 2009, 2013, 2017, and 2021. In 2025 Carl-Philipp Sassenrath, of the CDU, was elected.

Election	Member	Party	%
1949	Richard Muckermann	CDU	47.3
1953	Richard Muckermann	CDU	63.2
1957	Richard Muckermann	CDU	67.1
1961	Josef Rommerskirchen	CDU	59.1
1965	Josef Rommerskirchen	CDU	58.8
1969	Josef Rommerskirchen	CDU	52.3
1972	Josef Rommerskirchen	CDU	48.3
1976	Heinz Günther Hüsch	CDU	51.4
1980	Heinz Günther Hüsch	CDU	47.3
1983	Heinz Günther Hüsch	CDU	53.9
1987	Heinz Günther Hüsch	CDU	49.5
1990	Bertold Mathias Reinartz	CDU	50.2
1994	Bertold Mathias Reinartz	CDU	49.5
1998	Hermann Gröhe	CDU	45.9
2002	Kurt Bodewig	SPD	44.7
2005	Hermann Gröhe	CDU	47.5
2009	Hermann Gröhe	CDU	47.8
2013	Hermann Gröhe	CDU	51.6
2017	Hermann Gröhe	CDU	44.0
2021	Hermann Gröhe	CDU	35.8
2025	Carl-Philipp Sassenrath	CDU	36.3

== Election results ==
=== 2025 election ===
Federal election (2025): Neuss I
Notes:	Blue background denotes the winner of the electorate vote. Pink background denotes a candidate elected from their party list. Yellow background denotes an electorate win by a list member, or other incumbent. A ✓ or ✗ denotes status of any incumbent, win or lose respectively.						
Party	Candidate	Votes	%	±%	Party votes	%	±%
CDU	Carl-Philipp Sassenrath	62,250	36.3	▲0.5	56,600	32.9	▲2.9
SPD	Daniel Rinkert	46,410	27.1	▼5.0	32,057	18.6	▼8.6
AfD	Marcel Titzer	29,039	16.9	▲10.2	29,147	16.9	▲9.9
Greens	Katharina Janetta	14,559	8.5	▼2.8	18,439	10.7	▼2.9
Left	Roland Sperling	12,035	7.0	▲4.4	12,781	7.4	▲4.5
BSW					7,389	4.3	
FDP	Bijan Djir-Sarai	7,267	4.2	▼3.8	9,019	5.2	▼7.4
Tierschutzpartei					2,418	1.4	▼0.1
Volt					1,023	0.6	▲0.3
PARTEI				▼2.3	919	0.5	▼0.8
FW					706	0.4	▼0.1
dieBasis				▼1.3	499	0.3	▼0.8
Team Todenhöfer					418	0.2	▼0.6
PdF					329	0.2	▲0.2
BD					176	0.1	
Values					125	0.1	
MERA25					87	0.1	
MLPD					49	0.0	0.0
Pirates							▼0.4
Gesundheitsforschung							▼0.1
Humanists							▼0.1
ÖDP							▼0.1
Bündnis C							▼0.1
SGP						0.0	0.0
Informal votes		1,601			980		
Total valid votes		171,560			172,181		
Turnout		173,161	82.1	▲6.1			
CDU hold	Majority	15,840	9.2				

=== 2021 election ===
Federal election (2021): Neuss I
Notes:	Blue background denotes the winner of the electorate vote. Pink background denotes a candidate elected from their party list. Yellow background denotes an electorate win by a list member, or other incumbent. A ✓ or ✗ denotes status of any incumbent, win or lose respectively.						
Party	Candidate	Votes	%	±%	Party votes	%	±%
CDU	✓ Hermann Gröhe	57,445	35.8	▼8.2	48,166	29.9	▼6.0
SPD	Daniel Rinkert (Note: Rinkert entered the Bundestag on the SPD list after the death of Rainer Keller in September 2022.)	51,391	32.0	▲3.4	43,760	27.2	▲3.6
Greens	Petra Schenke	18,051	11.2	▲6.1	21,951	13.6	▲7.6
FDP	Bijan Djir-Sarai	12,932	8.1	▲0.8	20,333	12.6	▼2.2
AfD	Stefan Hrdy	10,801	6.7	▼1.9	11,298	7.0	▼2.4
Left	Falk vom Dorff	4,153	2.6	▼2.8	4,771	3.0	▼3.3
Tierschutzpartei					2,367	1.5	▲0.6
PARTEI	Lisa Granderath	3,617	2.3		1,774	1.1	▲0.3
dieBasis	Bastian Schönbeck	2,052	1.3		1,748	1.1	
Team Todenhöfer					1,393	0.9	
FW					861	0.5	▲0.2
Pirates					607	0.4	▼0.1
Volt					480	0.3	
LIEBE					234	0.1	
Gesundheitsforschung					231	0.1	▲0.1
LfK					166	0.1	
V-Partei3					149	0.1	0.0
NPD					132	0.1	▼0.1
Humanists					125	0.1	0.0
Independent	Ernst Herbert	120	0.1				
ÖDP					108	0.1	0.0
du.					72	0.0	
Bündnis C					61	0.0	
PdF					50	0.0	
DKP					44	0.0	0.0
LKR					31	0.0	
MLPD					29	0.0	0.0
SGP					25	0.0	0.0
Informal votes		1,605			1,201		
Total valid votes		160,561			160,966		
Turnout		162,167	76.0	▲1.5			
CDU hold	Majority	6,054	3.8	▼11.6			

=== 2017 election ===
Federal election (2017): Neuss I
Notes:	Blue background denotes the winner of the electorate vote. Pink background denotes a candidate elected from their party list. Yellow background denotes an electorate win by a list member, or other incumbent. A ✓ or ✗ denotes status of any incumbent, win or lose respectively.						
Party	Candidate	Votes	%	±%	Party votes	%	±%
CDU	✓ Hermann Gröhe	69,658	44.0	▼7.6	56,983	35.9	▼9.6
SPD	Daniel Rinkert	45,314	28.6	▼1.9	37,438	23.6	▼4.3
AfD	Dirk Helmut Kranefuß	13,675	8.6	▲5.9	14,887	9.4	▲5.3
FDP	Bijan Djir-Sarai	11,471	7.2	▲4.9	23,585	14.9	▲8.7
Left	Roland Sperling	8,535	5.4	▲1.5	9,895	6.2	▲1.3
Greens	Peter Gehrmann	8,131	5.1	▲0.4	9,583	6.0	▼0.1
Tierschutzpartei					1,313	0.8	
PARTEI					1,225	0.8	▲0.5
AD-DEMOKRATEN					848	0.5	
Pirates					723	0.5	▼1.9
FW	Annette Anni Gisela Elster	1,508	1.0	▲0.4	553	0.3	▼0.1
NPD					335	0.2	▼0.8
DiB					222	0.1	
V-Partei³					198	0.1	
BGE					163	0.1	
ÖDP					159	0.1	0.0
DM					158	0.1	
Gesundheitsforschung					141	0.1	
Volksabstimmung					141	0.1	▼0.1
Die Humanisten					102	0.1	
MLPD					82	0.1	0.0
DKP					28	0.0	
SGP					13	0.0	0.0
Informal votes		1,758			1,275		
Total valid votes		158,292			158,775		
Turnout		160,050	74.4	▲2.6			
CDU hold	Majority	24,344	15.4	▼5.6			

=== 2013 election ===
Federal election (2013): Neuss I
Notes:	Blue background denotes the winner of the electorate vote. Pink background denotes a candidate elected from their party list. Yellow background denotes an electorate win by a list member, or other incumbent. A ✓ or ✗ denotes status of any incumbent, win or lose respectively.						
Party	Candidate	Votes	%	±%	Party votes	%	±%
CDU	✓ Hermann Gröhe	78,712	51.6	▲3.8	69,480	45.5	▲8.1
SPD	Klaus Krützen	46,619	30.6	▲1.1	42,604	27.9	▲3.0
Greens	Lars Erik Schellhas	7,226	4.7	▼2.0	9,363	6.1	▼2.1
Left	Walter Hans Rogel-Obermanns	5,983	3.9	▼2.0	7,606	5.0	▼1.6
Pirates	Bianca Staubitz	3,891	2.6		3,666	2.4	▲0.7
FDP	Bijan Djir-Sarai	3,507	2.3	▼6.3	9,418	6.2	▼11.3
AfD	Bodo Dirk Aßmuth	4,155	2.7		6,276	4.1	
NPD	Reinhold Schäben	1,665	1.1	▼0.4	1,503	1.0	▼0.1
FW	Carsten Thiel	808	0.5		646	0.4	
PARTEI					464	0.3	
PRO					358	0.2	
Volksabstimmung					297	0.2	▲0.1
REP					226	0.1	▼0.2
BIG					201	0.1	
ÖDP					187	0.1	▲0.1
Nichtwahler					168	0.1	
Party of Reason					107	0.1	
RRP					92	0.1	▼0.1
BüSo					54	0.0	0.0
MLPD					39	0.0	0.0
PSG					39	0.0	0.0
Die Rechte					26	0.0	
Informal votes		1,878			1,635		
Total valid votes		152,566			152,809		
Turnout		154,444	72.0	▲1.9			
CDU hold	Majority	32,093	21.0	▲2.7			

=== 2009 election ===
Federal election (2009): Neuss I
Notes:	Blue background denotes the winner of the electorate vote. Pink background denotes a candidate elected from their party list. Yellow background denotes an electorate win by a list member, or other incumbent. A ✓ or ✗ denotes status of any incumbent, win or lose respectively.						
Party	Candidate	Votes	%	±%	Party votes	%	±%
CDU	✓ Hermann Gröhe	70,787	47.8	▲0.1	55,419	37.4	▼3.0
SPD	Hubert Eßer	43,614	29.5	▼10.8	36,812	24.8	▼10.5
FDP	Bijan Djir-Sarai	12,763	8.6	▲4.9	25,944	17.5	▲6.2
Greens	Ingo Kolmorgen	9,935	6.7	▲3.6	12,133	8.2	▲2.2
Left	Felizitas Wennmacher	8,709	5.9	▲2.5	9,755	6.6	▲2.6
Pirates					2,556	1.7	
NPD	Reinhold Schäben	2,168	1.5	▲0.4	1,543	1.0	▲0.2
Tierschutzpartei					989	0.7	▲0.2
FAMILIE					813	0.5	▲0.2
RENTNER					603	0.4	
REP					530	0.4	0.0
Centre					509	0.3	0.0
RRP					242	0.2	
Volksabstimmung					133	0.1	0.0
ÖDP					107	0.1	
DVU					85	0.1	
MLPD					30	0.0	0.0
BüSo					22	0.0	0.0
PSG					22	0.0	0.0
Informal votes		1,966			1,695		
Total valid votes		147,976			148,247		
Turnout		149,942	70.1	▼7.2			
CDU hold	Majority	27,173	18.3	▲10.9			

=== 2005 election ===
Federal election (2005): Neuss I
Notes:	Blue background denotes the winner of the electorate vote. Pink background denotes a candidate elected from their party list. Yellow background denotes an electorate win by a list member, or other incumbent. A ✓ or ✗ denotes status of any incumbent, win or lose respectively.						
Party	Candidate	Votes	%	±%	Party votes	%	±%
CDU	Hermann Gröhe	77,781	47.7	▲4.1	60,704	43.2	▼2.3
SPD	✗ Kurt Bodewig	65,603	40.3	▼4.5	57,537	35.3	▼3.3
FDP	Bijan Djir-Sarai	51994	3.7	▼2.4	18,411	11.3	▲1.0
Left	Roland Sperling	5,464	3.4	▲2.5	6,484	4.0	▲3.0
Greens	Ingo Kolmorgen	5,111	3.1	▼0.4	9,806	6.0	▼1.0
NPD	Willibrord Osmers	1,673	1.0		1,392	0.9	▲0.7
Centre	Hans-Joachim Woitzik	1,297	0.8	▲0.4	577	0.4	▲0.1
Tierschutzpartei					786	0.5	▲0.2
GRAUEN					648	0.4	▲0.2
Familie					635	0.4	▲0.2
REP					550	0.3	
From Now on... Democracy Through Referendum					144	0.1	
PBC					101	0.1	
Socialist Equality Party					72	0.0	
BüSo					44	0.0	
MLPD					67	0.0	0.0
Informal votes		1,570			1,476		
Total valid votes		162,923			163,017		
Turnout		164,493	77.3	▼2.9			
CDU gain from SPD	Majority	12,178	7.4				
