= Hermann Gröhe =

German politician (born 1961)

Hermann Gröhe MdB
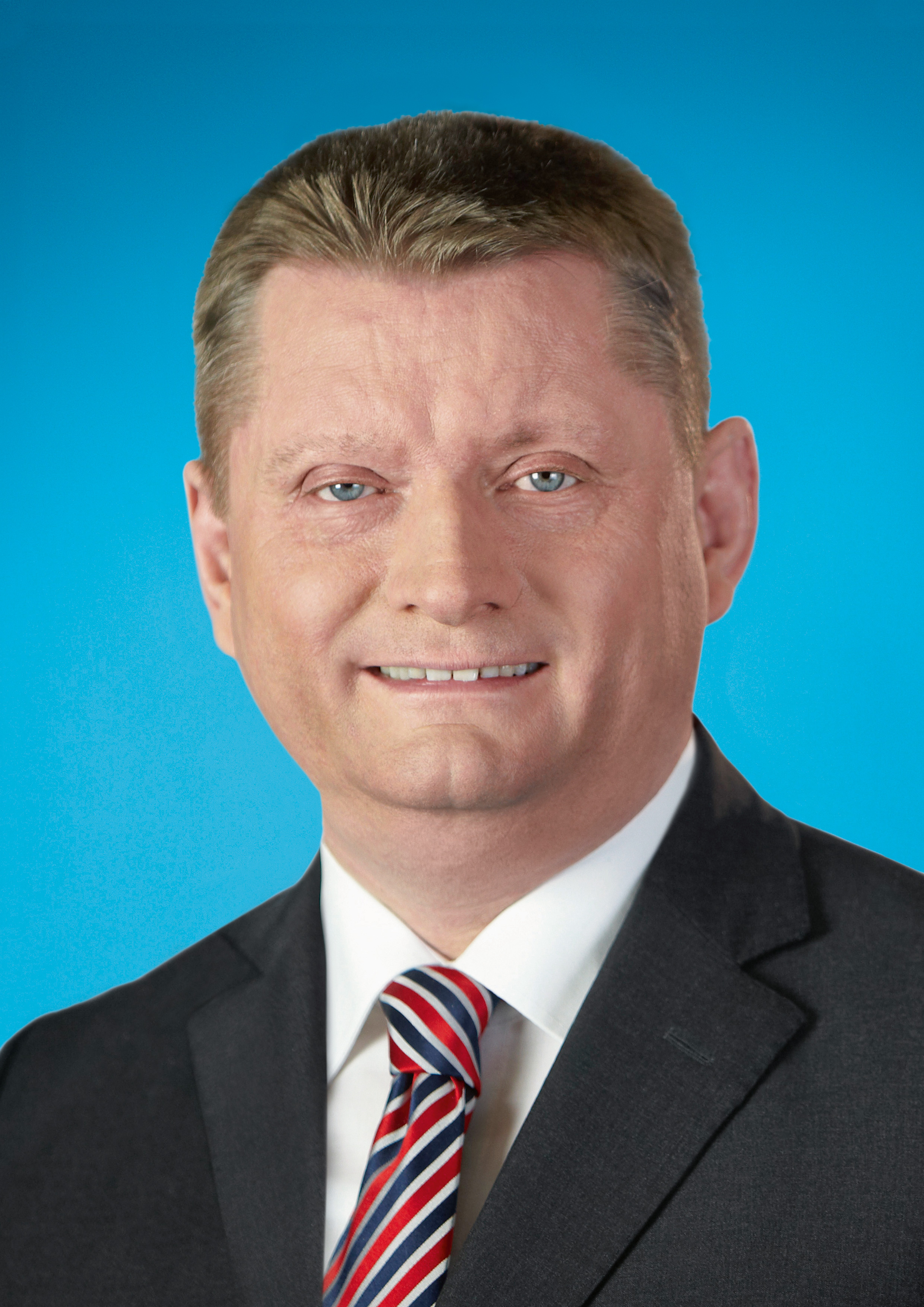

Federal Minister of Health
- In office 17 December 2013 – 14 March 2018
- Chancellor: Angela Merkel
- Preceded by: Daniel Bahr
- Succeeded by: Jens Spahn

General Secretary of the Christian Democratic Union
- In office 28 October 2009 – 17 December 2013
- Leader: Angela Merkel
- Preceded by: Ronald Pofalla
- Succeeded by: Peter Tauber

Minister of State for the Federal Chancellery
- In office 1 October 2008 – 28 October 2009
- Chancellor: Angela Merkel
- Preceded by: Hildegard Müller
- Succeeded by: Eckart von Klaeden

Member of the Bundestag for North Rhine-Westphalia
- In office 10 November 1994 – 23 February 2025
- Succeeded by: Carl-Philipp Sassenrath
- Constituency: Neuss I (1998–2002; 2005–2025); State Wide Party List (1994–1998; 2002–2005)

Personal details
- Born: Gottfried Hermann Gröhe; 25 February 1961 (age 65) Uedem, West Germany
- Party: CDU
- Education: University of Cologne

Gottfried Hermann Gröhe (born 25 February 1961) is a German lawyer and politician of the Christian Democratic Union (CDU) who served as Minister of Health in the third cabinet of Chancellor Angela Merkel from 2013 until 2018.

Following his departure from active politics, Gröhe took office as President of the German Red Cross (DRK) in 2025.

== Early life and career ==
Gröhe finished law school at the University of Cologne and was a research assistant at the university from 1987 to 1993. He also worked as a trainee lawyer at a local court in Cologne from 1991 until 1993. He has been a licensed lawyer since 1997.

== Political career ==
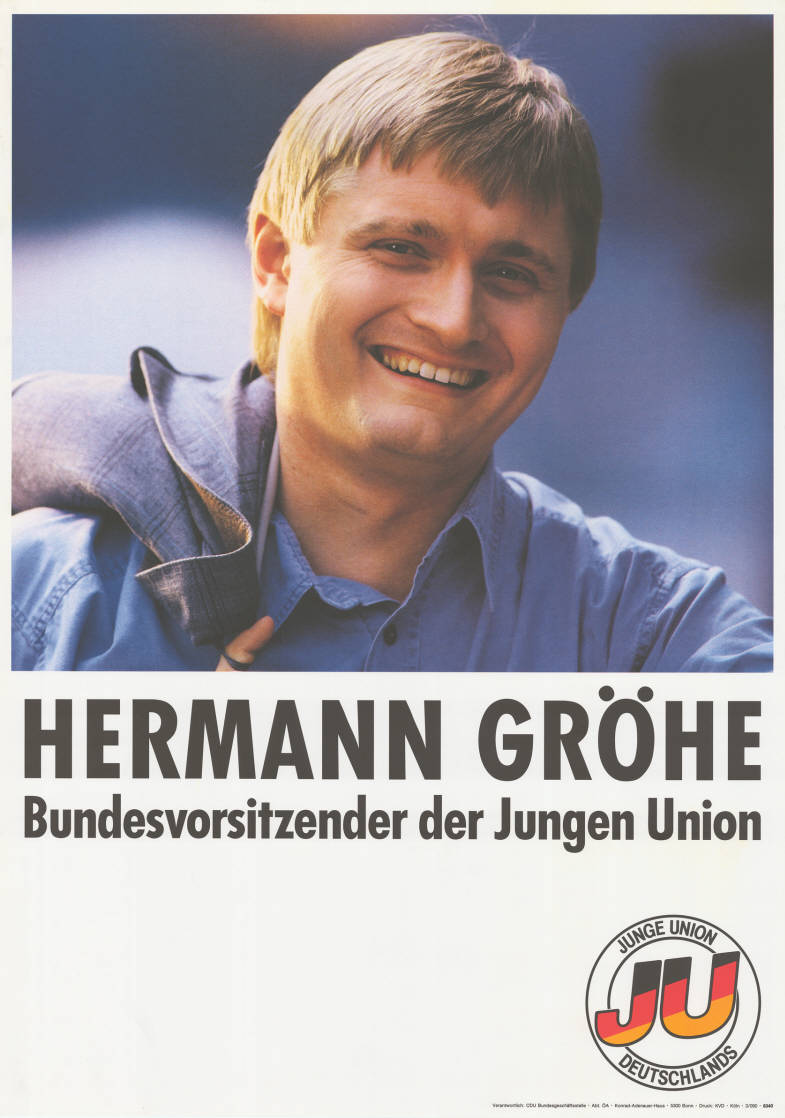
Gröhe on an advertising of the Jungen Union, 1990

Gröhe was active member of Junge Union (JU) the youth organization of CDU which he joined as a schoolboy 1975. He led the JU as federal chairman from 1989 till 1994.

Becoming a member of CDU in 1977, Gröhe has been a member of the German Bundestag since the 1994 elections, representing the Neuss I constituency. Between 1998 and 2005, he was his parliamentary group's spokesperson on human rights and humanitarian aid. He subsequently served on the Committee on Foreign Affairs from 2005 until 2008.

From 2008 until 2009, Gröhe briefly served as Minister of State at the Federal Chancellery under Chancellor Angela Merkel. In the negotiations to form a coalition government following the 2009 federal elections, he was a member of the working group on economic affairs and energy, led by Karl-Theodor zu Guttenberg and Rainer Brüderle.

=== Secretary General of the CDU, 2009–2013 ===
As successor of Ronald Pofalla, Gröhe was secretary general of the CDU 2009–2013; serving as the campaign manager in the 2013 elections. He was credited with marshalling Angela Merkel’s electoral victory that year, the party's best result since German reunification in 1990. In the negotiations to form a coalition government following the elections, Gröhe was part of the 15-member leadership circle chaired by Merkel, Horst Seehofer and Sigmar Gabriel.

=== Federal Minister of Health, 2013–2018 ===
Following the formation of the third cabinet of Chancellor Angela Merkel, Gröhe took office as Federal Minister of Health. His deputies were Ingrid Fischbach and Annette Widmann-Mauz.

In October 2014, Gröhe's elderly care reform bill, which is supposed to better fit the individual needs of those in care and expected to cost the government a further 1.2 billion euro ($1.5 billion), was passed by the Bundestag.

In December 2014, Gröhe was surprisingly contested by Jens Spahn for a place on the CDU's ruling council, in a move that was widely seen as crystallizing the generational tensions within the party. Spahn's election bid was backed by the then 72-year-old finance minister, Wolfgang Schäuble. Shortly before the vote at the annual CDU party conference, Gröhe withdrew his candidacy and Spahn was elected.

During his time in office, Gröhe also focused heavily on global health issues. Alongside his colleague Gerd Müller, he travelled to Ghana and Liberia right after the West African Ebola virus epidemic in 2015. That same year, he accompanied Merkel when she spoke at the opening of the annual World Health Assembly in Geneva on the need for reforming the World Health Organization (WHO) to ensure there is prompt response to health emergencies. As part of Germany's G7 presidency in 2015, he brought together G7 Health Ministers to adopt a declaration addressing antimicrobial resistance (AMR).

In March 2016, Gröhe was appointed by United Nations Secretary-General Ban Ki-moon to the High-Level Commission on Health Employment and Economic Growth, which was co-chaired by presidents François Hollande of France and Jacob Zuma of South Africa. He later led Germany's delegation to the 2016 High Level Meeting on Ending AIDS in New York.

Ahead of the 2017 elections, Gröhe was elected to lead his party's campaign in the state of North Rhine-Westphalia, Germany's most populous state. In the negotiations to form a fourth coalition government under Merkel, he led the working group on health policy, alongside Malu Dreyer and Georg Nüßlein.

=== Later career ===
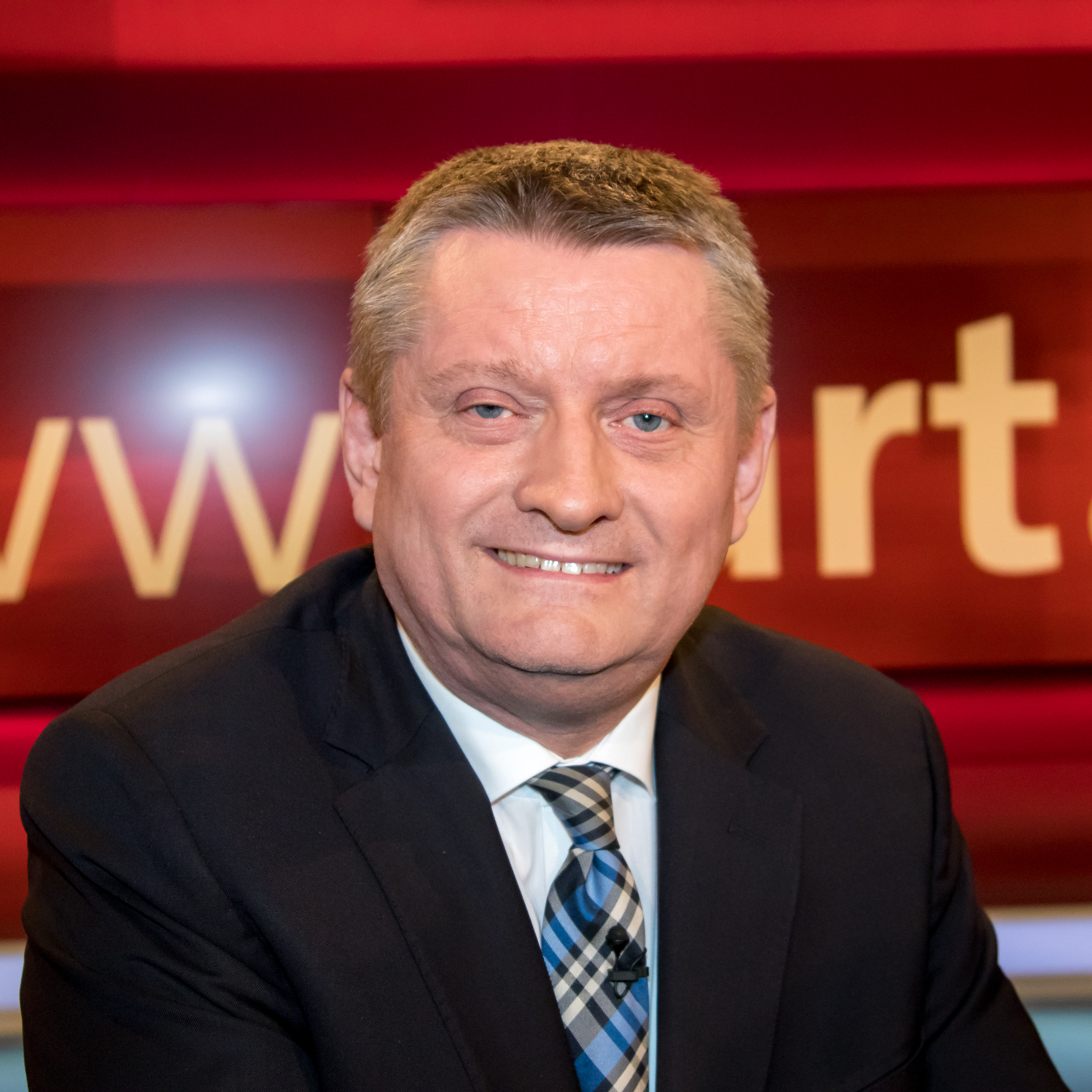
Gröhe during the TV show hart aber fair, 2017

From March 2018, Gröhe served as deputy chairman of the CDU/CSU parliamentary group under the leadership of Volker Kauder (2017–2018), Ralph Brinkhaus (2018–2022) and Friedrich Merz (2022–2025). In this capacity, he oversaw the group's initiatives on social affairs and development policy. He was also appointed to the Pension Commission of the Federal Ministry of Labour and Social Affairs, a body mandated to draft recommendations for Germany's old-age pension system.

In July 2024, Gröhe announced that he would not stand in the 2025 federal elections but instead resign from active politics by the end of the parliamentary term.

== Other activities ==
=== Corporate boards ===
- Ecclesia Gruppe, Member of the Supervisory Board (since 2019)

=== Non-profit organizations ===
- Deutsche Nationalstiftung, Member of the Board
- Hermann Kunst Foundation for the Promotion of New Testament Textual Research, Member of the Board of Trustees
- Internationales Bildungs- und Begegnungswerk (IBB), Member of the Board of Trustees
- German Forum for Crime Prevention (DFK), Ex-Officio Member of the Board of Trustees (2013–2018)
- Chrismon, Co-editor (2000–2009)
- Evangelical Church in Germany (EKD), Member of the Council (1997–2009)
- German Institute for Human Rights (DIMR), Member of the Board of Trustees (2001–)
- Konrad Adenauer Foundation (KAS), Member of the Board (since 2001)
- ZDF, Member of the Television Board

== Political positions ==
=== Domestic politics ===
Ahead of the Christian Democrats' leadership election in 2018, he publicly endorsed Annegret Kramp-Karrenbauer to succeed Angela Merkel as the party's chair. For the 2021 leadership election, he later endorsed Armin Laschet.

=== Human rights ===
Addressing a United Nations "interfaith" meeting in 2008, Gröhe defended the right to convert to another faith, a right not recognized in some Muslim countries; he called it "unacceptable that up until now laws in some countries threaten those who want to convert with the death penalty."

After an 18-month-old boy died of measles in Berlin in 2015, Gröhe warned publicly that "those who refuse to vaccinate their children endanger not only them but others, threatening serious health problems."

In June 2017, Gröhe voted against Germany's introduction of same-sex marriage.

In April 2020, Gröhe co-signed – alongside around 50 other members of his parliamentary group – a letter to President of the European Commission Ursula von der Leyen which called on the European Union to take in children who were living in migrant camps across Greece.

== Personal life ==
Gröhe is married to former hospital administrator Heidi Oldenkott-Gröhe; they have three sons and one daughter. He is a Protestant.
