= Husch =

Husch or Hüsch is a German surname. Notable people with the surname include:

- Gerhard Hüsch (1901–1984), German singer
- Hanns Dieter Hüsch (1925–2005), German author, cabaret artist, actor, songwriter and radio commentator
- Heinz Günther Hüsch (1929-2023), German lawyer and politician
