= India–Timor-Leste relations =

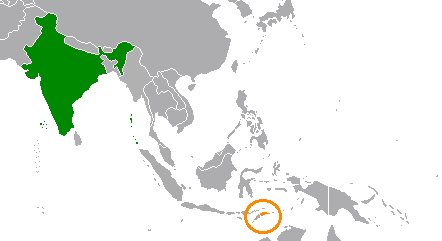

- India: Timor-Leste

India–Timor-Leste relations are the international relations that exist between India and Timor-Leste. India maintains an embassy in Dili, while Timor-Leste maintains an embassy in New Delhi. India previously announced on 7 September 2023 that it would open its embassy in Dili.

== History ==
Relations between Timor-Leste and India date back to the early modern period. Indian traders traveled to the island in search of sandalwood. Trade links increased after the Portuguese colonisation of East Timor and portions of India. The Portuguese set up various garrisoned centres in India to carry out this trade, and all of Portugal's territories in Asia—including East Timor—were governed by the Portuguese Viceroy in Goa. Portuguese-trained Goan missionaries arrived in East Timor in the early 17th century, and were influential in spreading Catholicism in the country. Indians also traveled to East Timor to serve as soldiers, colonial bureaucrats, and missionaries. Some Indians arrived in East Timor in the late 19th century to work as migrant labour. A small community of Timorese nationals of Goan descent trace their heritage back to these previous generations of immigrants.

India was the second country to recognize the independence of Timor-Leste. Minister of State for External Affairs, Omar Abdullah led a high-level delegation representing India at Timor-Leste's Independence Day celebrations in May 2002. Abdullah presented letters of felicitations from the President of India, Prime Minister Atal Bihari Vajpayee and the External Affairs Minister. Diplomatic relations between the two countries were formally established on 24 January 2003. At the UN General Assembly in 2003, Timor-Leste Prime Minister Mari Alkatiri announced his country's support for India's candidature for a permanent seat in the UN Security Council.

Indian diplomats Kamlesh Sharma and Atul Khare served as the Special Representative of Secretary General (SRSG) in Timor-Leste until 2004 and 2009 respectively. India's DPR in New York was a member of the UN Security Council appointed team that visited Timor-Leste in November to assess the situation on the ground and seek feedback from the all parties regarding the withdrawal of the United Nations Integrated Mission in Timor-Leste (UNMIT)’s and the situation in the country post-withdrawal.

Timor-Leste voted for India's candidature for a non-permanent seat during 2011-12. The country also supported the election of Poonam Khetrapal Singh for the post of Regional Director, South East Asia Regional office (SEARO),WHO, in September 2013. Timor-Leste co-sponsored a resolution moved by India at the UN General Assembly in January 2015, to declare 21 June as International Yoga Day.

Several high-level visits between officials of the two countries have taken place. East Timorese Vice Minister of Health Natalia D. Araujo visited Delhi to participate in the 'International Conference on Traditional Medicine for South East Asian Countries' in February 2013, and is the first East Timorese government official to visit India. Finance Minister Emília Pires visited India in May 2013 to attend the ADB Governors’ Meeting. Hernâni Coelho was the first East Timorese Foreign Minister to India. He arrived in the country on a two-day visit in 27–29 March 2016 and met with the Minister of External Affairs Sushma Swaraj, Minister of State for External Affairs Vijay Kumar Singh and the Minister of Health and Family Welfare.

In January 2024, José Ramos-Horta made the first visit by an East Timorese president to India. Accompanied by Minister of Foreign Affairs and Cooperation Bendito Freitas, he attended the 10th biennial Vibrant Gujarat summit. In August 2024, president Droupadi Murmu made the first visit by an Indian head of state to Timor-Leste, as part of a series of visits to Pacific region countries.

== Trade ==
Bilateral trade between Timor-Leste and India totaled US$3.45 million in 2015–16, declining by 3% from the previous fiscal. India exported $3.42 million worth of goods to Timor-Leste, and imported $30,000. The main commodities exported by India to Timor-Leste are pharmaceuticals, plastics and electrical machinery. The major commodity imported by India from Timor-Leste is chemical products.

The first ever Indian business delegation to Timor-Leste visited the country in October 2014, led by the Indian Ambassador to Indonesia. India provides Timor-Leste with unilateral duty free tariff preferential (DFTP) market access for export of goods and services.

Some Indian firms have made investments in Timor-Leste's oil & gas industry. They are active in oil and gas exploration off the coast of Timor-Leste. Reliance Petroleum was awarded the rights to explore oil in two blocks (EEZ and the JPDA) in 2006 off the coast of Timor-Leste. Reliance Petroleum began gas exploration in the Timor Sea in late 2010. Indian microfinance institution BASIX provided technical assistance to Timorese microfinance institution Tuba Rai Metin.

Tata Motors supplied 400 vehicles for use by the Timorese police and other government agencies in 2006.

== Cultural relations ==
As of December 2016, around 25 Indians are employed as advisors in the various Ministries, UN agencies and international donors based in Timor-Leste. There are also some Indian entrepreneurs, and others involved in trading and the restaurant business. There is a small community of Timorese nationals of Goan descent in Timor-Leste. Some members of the community have achieved prominence in the country such as former Defense Minister Roque Rodrigues. Manuel Longuinhos was a Prosecutor General and the first-ever surgeon in Timor-Leste. There are also a few prominent Indian ecumenical and business families.

Several East Timorese students study at Father Muller's educational institutions in Mangalore, Karnataka.

== Foreign aid ==
Assam-based Cane and Bamboo Technology Centre (CBTC) served as the technical partner for a project to establish a bamboo skills development and demonstration centre in Timor-Leste that was initially begun by the United Nations Industrial Development Organization (UNIDO) in October 2004. The $1 million project is aimed at establishing bamboo as an important sector in Timor-Leste, and was completed in May 2012.

The Government of India approved a grant in aid for infrastructure projects in Timor-Leste in October 2008. The Indian Embassy in Jakarta donated $100,000 to Timor-Leste in March 2010. In March 2014, India offered to establish a Centre of Excellence in Information Technology (CEIT) in Timor-Leste. India donated a fully equipped ambulance unit which can serve as a mobile operation theatre, funded at a cost of $71,0000 by the Indian Ministry of External Affairs, to the Timor-Leste Health Ministry in January 2016.

IBSA will provide funding for the “Conservation Agriculture, Permaculture and Sustainable Fisheries Management: Enhancing Food and Nutrition Security and Reducing Risk Disaster in TL" project developed by FAO and two NGOs.

Citizens of Timor-Leste are eligible for scholarships under the Indian Technical and Economic Cooperation Programme, the Indian Council for Cultural Relations, and the General Cultural Scholarship Scheme (GCSS). East Timorese diplomats have also attended the Professional Course for Foreign Diplomats (PCFD) organised by the Foreign Service Institute of the Ministry of External Affairs. India also provided training for East Timorese women in association with the East Timor Development Agency.

== See also ==
- Foreign relations of India
- Foreign relations of Timor-Leste
