= List of ambassadors of Israel to Timor-Leste =

== List of ambassadors ==
- Eli Vered Hazan - 2023 -
- Sagi Karni - 2019 - 2023 .
- Simona Halperin 2017 - 2019.

== See also ==
- East Timor–Israel relations
