= Russia–Timor-Leste relations =

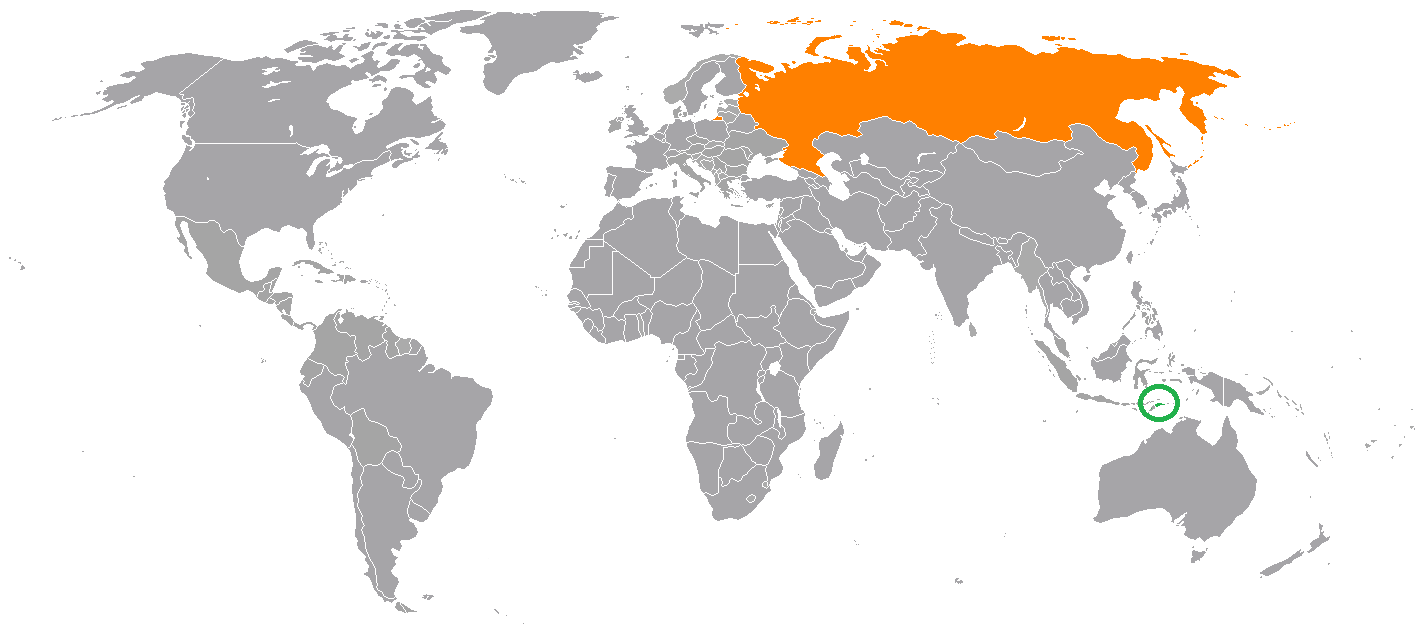

- Timor-Leste: Russia

Russia–Timor-Leste relations (Russian: Российско-восточнотиморские отношения) are the bilateral relations between Russia and Timor-Leste. Neither country has a resident ambassador. Russia was one of the first countries to recognize Timor-Leste's independence and took part in nearly all UN aid programs, providing food and relief personnel, including civil and transport aviation pilots.

== Diplomatic ties ==
On 20 May 2002, Russian president Vladimir Putin signed an ukaz recognising the independence of Timor-Leste, and instructed the Russian Ministry of Foreign Affairs to establish diplomatic relations with the newly independent state. On 24 June 2002, Alexander Vladimirovich Yakovenko of the Russian Foreign Ministry announced that following negotiations with East Timorese representatives, it was confirmed that Russia had established diplomatic relations with Timor-Leste. Russia is represented in Timor-Leste through its embassy in Jakarta (Indonesia).

After the 2022 Russian invasion of Ukraine had begun, Timor-Leste expressed concern and called on the parties to the conflict to agree to an immediate ceasefire and seek a diplomatic solution. According to an official statement by the Ministry of Foreign Affairs and Cooperation, "Ukraine's independence must be respected." At the eleventh emergency special session of the United Nations General Assembly on 2 March 2022, Timor-Leste voted to condemn Russia for attacking Ukraine and to demand an immediate withdrawal of Russian troops from Ukraine. Timor-Leste also supported the suspension of Russia's membership of the UN Human Rights Council.

== Humanitarian ties ==
In June 2001, Russian airline TyumenAviaTrans (now known as UTair), was awarded a one-year contract to supply the United Nations Mission of Support to East Timor with helicopter support utilising the Mil Mi-26, in a contract worth US-Dollar 6.5 million.

== See also ==
- Foreign relations of Timor-Leste
- Foreign relations of Russia
