= Daniel Rinkert =

German politician (born 1987)

Daniel Rinkert (born 11 December 1987) is a German politician from the SPD. He became a member of the Bundestag in October 2022, replacing Rainer Keller who died.

== Political career ==
Rinkert unsuccessfully contested the Neuss I constituency in the 2017 and 2021 elections.

== See also ==
- List of members of the 20th Bundestag
