= Japan–Timor-Leste relations =

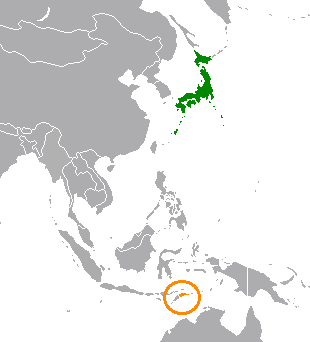

- Japan: Timor-Leste

Japan–Timor-Leste relations are foreign relations between Japan and Timor-Leste. Diplomatic relations were established in September 2002. East Timor has an embassy in Tokyo. Japan has an embassy in Dili.

== History ==
Japan–Timor-Leste relations were established on May 20, 2002, when UN Administration of the Area was abolished, replaced by the Government of Timor-Leste. The Japanese government has had an "ambassadorial-level representative office in Dili on the day. Japan is the third aid donor to Timor-Leste.

== See also ==
- Foreign relations of Timor-Leste
- Foreign relations of Japan
