= Timor-Leste–United Kingdom relations =

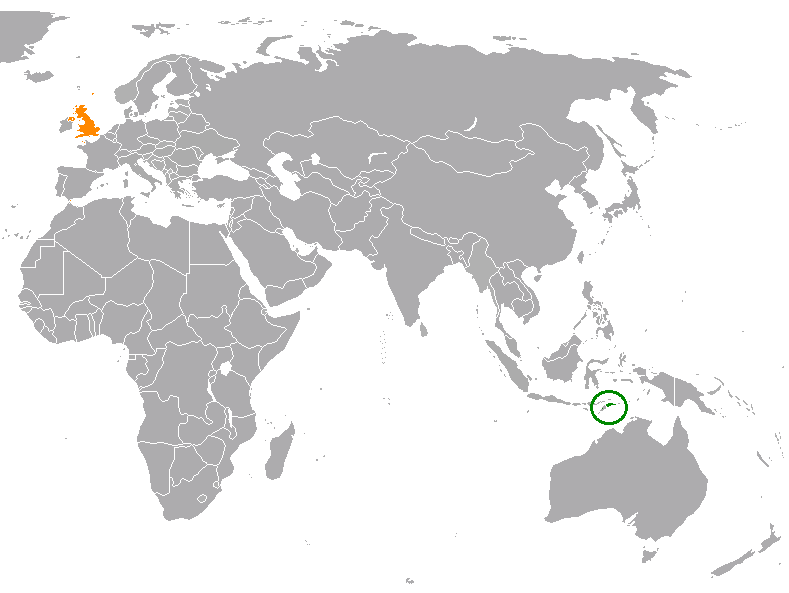

- Timor-Leste: United Kingdom

Diplomatic mission
- Embassy of Timor-Leste, London: none

Timor-Leste–United Kingdom relations refer to the diplomatic, historical, and bilateral relations between the Democratic Republic of Timor-Leste (East Timor) and the United Kingdom of Great Britain and Northern Ireland. The two countries formally established diplomatic relations following East Timor’s independence in 2002.

Both countries share common membership of the International Criminal Court, the United Nations, and the World Trade Organization.

== History ==
The United Kingdom was supportive of East Timor's transition to independence from Indonesia, especially during the 1999 East Timorese crisis. British diplomatic efforts aligned with international calls for peacekeeping and humanitarian intervention. The UK contributed personnel to the International Force East Timor (INTERFET) under Australian command, which was instrumental in restoring stability during the post-referendum violence.

Following the restoration of independence, the UK recognised East Timor and established diplomatic relations, initially through non-resident accreditation from the British Embassy in Jakarta, Indonesia. In 2011, the United Kingdom opened a resident diplomatic mission in Dili, the capital of East Timor, although it later transitioned back to non-resident accreditation.

The United Kingdom committed its support for the accession of Timor-Leste to ASEAN. The UK provided in-depth technical assistance to the government of Timor-Leste on meeting ASEAN's free trade agreement requirements, including through a workshop on developing preferential rules of origin legislation. This boosted Timor-Leste's progress towards implementing an origin certification scheme for ‘Made in Timor-Leste’ products to benefit from trade preferences.

== Diplomatic missions ==
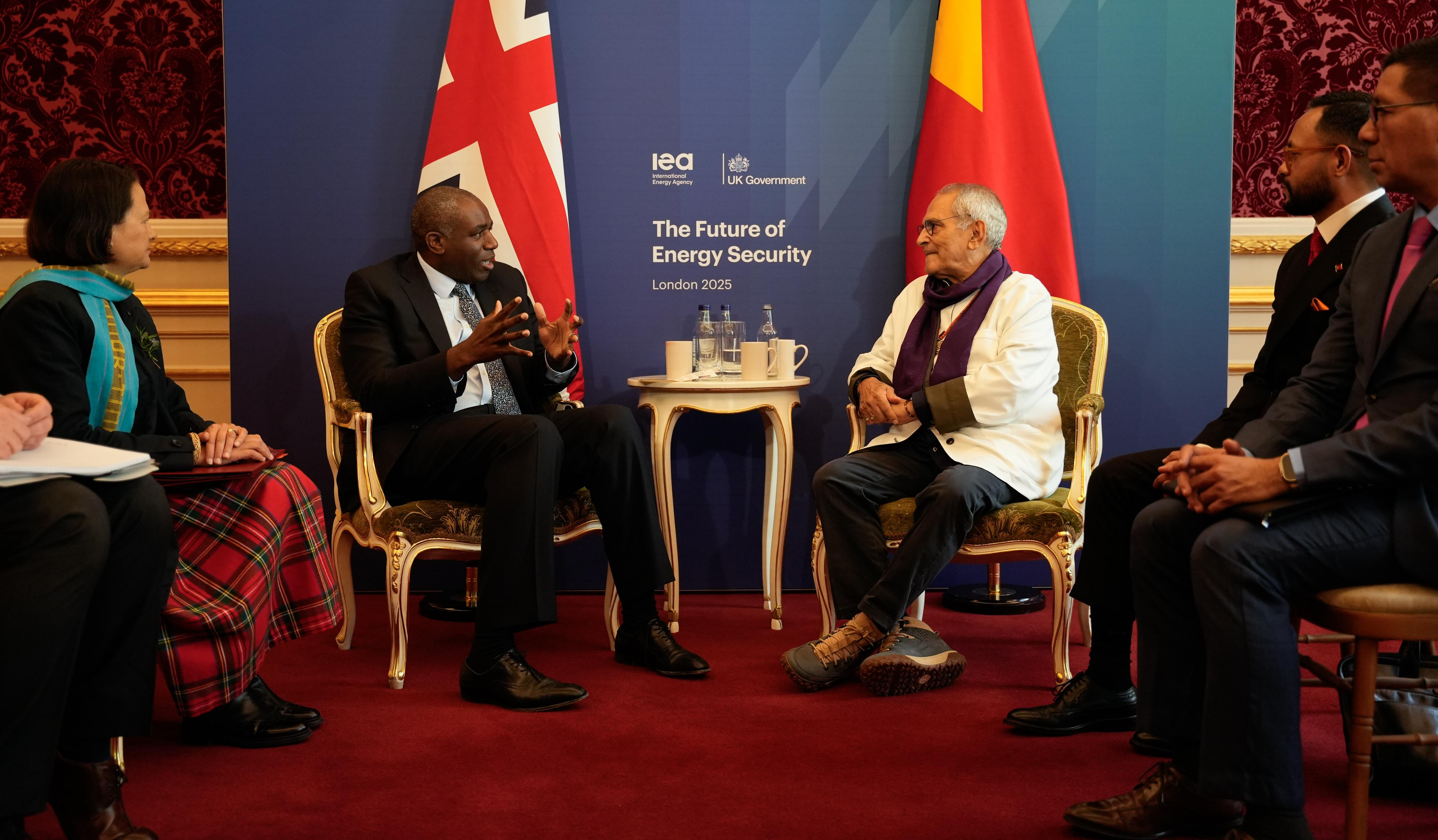
British Foreign Secretary David Lammy with East Timorese President José Ramos-Horta in London, April 2025.

Timor-Leste established diplomatic relations with the United Kingdom on 2002.

- Timor-Leste maintains an embassy in London.
- The United Kingdom is accredited to Timor-Leste from its embassy in Jakarta; there is no British embassy in Timor-Leste. On 29 February 2024, the UK announced its intentions to re-open an embassy in Dili.

== See also ==
- Foreign relations of Timor-Leste
- Foreign relations of the United Kingdom
