= Carl-Philipp Sassenrath =

German politician (born 1990)

Member of the Bundestag
- Assuming office 2025
- Succeeding: Hermann Gröhe
- Constituency: Neuss I

Personal details
- Born: 1990 (age 35–36)
- Party: Christian Democratic Union
- Education: University of Heidelberg; University of Münster

Carl-Philipp Sassenrath (born 1990) is a German politician of the Christian Democratic Union (CDU) who has been serving as a member of the Bundestag since the 2025 elections, representing the Neuss I district.

== Education and early career ==
Sassenrath studied law. As part of his education, he completed internships at the Federal Chancellery of Germany and the Federal Foreign Office.

After graduating from university in 2020, Sassenrath worked for the Federal Ministry for Economic Affairs and Climate Action and as advisor to minister Jens Spahn at the Federal Ministry of Health. From 2022 to 2025, he worked as advisor to Spahn in his capacity as deputy chair of the CDU/CSU parliamentary group.

== Political career ==
In parliament, Sassenrath has been a member of the Committee on Transport, the Committee on Legal Affairs and Consumer Protection and its Subcommittee on European Law. In addition to his committee assignments, he has been serving as deputy chair of the Parliamentary Friendship Group for Relations with the Maghreb States.
