= 2016 High Level Meeting on Ending AIDS =

UN meeting concerning AIDS prevention

The 2016 High Level Meeting on Ending AIDS was one of the annual United Nations Meetings on HIV and AIDS, starting on 8 June, and ending 2 days later, on 10 June 2016, in New York. It was co-facilitated by Switzerland and Zambia, and the United Nations President of the General Assembly. In another side-event, 30 New York mayors declared the AIDS epidemic would be ended by 2030.

The ban of 11 LGBT organizations by 51 Muslim states caused protests by the United States, Canada, the European Union and LGBT communities. 57 countries including Egypt, Iran, Saudi Arabia and the United Arab Emirates from the Organisation of Islamic Cooperation requested the removal of LGBT associations in a letter giving no explicit reason for it.

The official website for this meeting is archived, but it can be found here:

Side events were also hosted, before, and after the meeting, seen below. The goals set during the main meeting were:

To have fewer than 500,000 newly infected with AIDS by 2020 (Achieved. The AIDS epidemic was considered to be ended by the WHO at the end of 2019.)

To have fewer than 500,000 people dying from AIDS by 2020.(Failed. 690,000 people died from AIDS-related causes at the end of 2019.)

To eliminate HIV-related discrimination (Failed.)

== Side events of the meeting ==
=== Elimination of mother-to-child transmission of HIV and syphilis: celebrating country success ===
This event was held on 7 June 2016, at the hours 5:00 pm to 6:30 pm, located in the Delegates Lounge of the United Nations. The event celebrated the removal of mother-to-child transmission of HIV & syphilis. The members were:

- Poonam Khetrapal Singh (WHO Regional Director for South East Asia)
- Ren Minghui (former WHO Assistant-Director-General of HIV & AIDS)
- Michel Sidibe (former UNAIDS Executive Director)

In the WHO's official website and flyer, it also included these groups as members, but names were not specified:

- Senior Representatives from UNICEF and UNFIPA
- Ministers of Health from successful countries (what was 'successful' in the context provided was unknown)

=== Ending TB deaths among PLHIV: time for action ===
This was the second side-event of the meeting, held on a Wednesday, 8 June 2016, from 8:00 am to 9:30 am, at Room CR7 of the United Nations. It was a ministerial panel (small group) meeting organized by WHO in collaboration with the Stop TB partnership. The meeting was aimed to intensify and add more efforts to stop the spread of TB among people living with HIV.

Eric Goosby (UN Special Envoy on TB)

Speakers included:

- Ren Minghui, (former WHO assistant director-general)
- Aaron Motsoaledi (Minister of Health of South Africa)
- Tedros Adhanom Ghebreyesus (Stop TB Partnership Board Chair)
- Isaac Adewole (Minister of Foreign Affairs of Ethiopia)
- Ariel Pablos-Méndez (Minister of Health of Nigeria)
- Assistant Administrator for Global Health (Unknown who this is)
- Elhadj As Sy, (Child and Maternal Survival Coordinator, USAID)
- Joanne Carter (Secretary General)
- Mark Dybul (executive director)
- Thokozile Beatrex Nkhoma (executive director of The Global Fund to Fight AIDS, TB and Malaria)
- Malawi (Community Representative)

=== "Treat-all" from policy to action – what will it take? ===
This was the third event of the 2016 meeting. It lasted from 1:00 pm to 2:30 pm on 9 June 2016, in Conference Room 11 of the United Nations. It was cosponsored by Côte d'Ivoire, South Africa, Thailand, and the United States of America. The event, according to WHO, would highlight the elimination of the AIDS disease by 2030, and featured presentations by senior UN delegates that showcased multiple possible methods to eliminate AIDS.

Members who joined were:

- Ren Minghui (former WHO Assistant Director-General)
- Aaron Motsoaledi (Minister of Health of South Africa.)

Speakers included:

- Piyasakol Sakolsatayadorn, (Minister of Public Health of Thailand)
- Raymonde Goudou Coffie (Minister of Health)
- Côte d'Ivoire (Marisol Touraine)
- Minister of Health of France; (Ambassador Deborah Birx,)
- PEPFAR: USA
- Wu Zunyou, (former Department of Disease Control of China)
- Loyce Matur, (Africaid Zvandiri, Zimbabwe.)

The side-event was moderated by Gottfried Hirnschall, (Director of WHO Department of HIV).
