= Timor-Leste–Turkey relations =

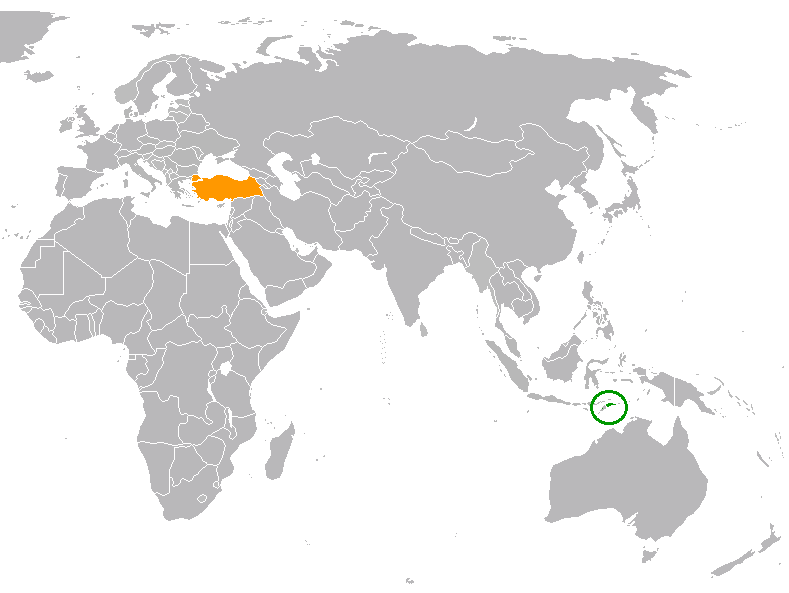

- Timor-Leste: Turkey

Timor-Leste–Turkey relations are the foreign relations between Timor-Leste and Turkey. The Turkish ambassador in Jakarta, Indonesia is also accredited to Timor-Leste since 2003.

Turkey and Timor-Leste cooperate through the Community of Portuguese Language Countries, where Turkey became an Associate Observer.

== Diplomatic relations ==
Timor-Leste and Turkey established diplomatic relations on 20 May 2002.

Turkey has assisted Timor-Leste under the Frente Revolucionária de Timor-Leste Independente government in developing agriculture. Even though improving agricultural productivity is a stated priority for the government, only 2% of the government budget has been allocated to agriculture.

In response to the lack of support for agricultural development, Turkey has initially cooperated with Bishop Alberto Ricardo da Silva of Dili, by providing food to south-eastern districts during a drought in January 2005. Following this assistance, Turkey, cooperating with the United Nations, started initiatives including rehabilitation and reconstruction of irrigation systems, introduction of water harvesting techniques, wider distribution of improved seeds of cereal crops, fruits and vegetables, livestock health, aquaculture projects, and sustainable management of forests and other natural resources.

== Economic relations ==
- Trade volume between the two countries was negligible in 2019.

== See also ==
- Foreign relations of Timor-Leste
- Foreign relations of Turkey

== See also ==
- Auweraert, Peter Van der. Dealing with the 2006 internal displacement crisis in Timor-Leste. https://www.ictj.org/sites/default/files/ICTJ-BrookingsDisplacement-Timor-Leste-CaseStudy-2012-English.pdf. 2012.
- Berthe, Louis. 1972. Bei Gua itinéraire des ancêtres. Mythes des Bunaq de Timor [Bei Gua itinerary of the ancestors...]. Paris: CNRS.
- Boxer, Charles Ralph. 1948, rep. 1968. Turbulent Timor. In Fidalgos in the Far East 1550–1770, pp. 174–198. Oxford: Oxford University Press. p. 31.
- Carey, Peter. East Timor at the crossroads: The forging of a nation. Honolulu, Hawaii: University of Hawai’i Press. Chap. 5. “The War in the Hills, 1975–1985: A Fretilin Commander Remembers”/Paulino Gama (Mauk Muruk). 1995.
- Chopra, Jarat. The UN's Kingdom of East Timor. Survival 42: pp. 27–39 London. 2000.
- Chrystello, J. Timor Leste: The secret files 1973–1974. Lisbon: Contemporânea. 1974.
- Cotton, James. East Timor, Australia and regional order. Intervention and its aftermath in Southeast Asia. London: Routledge. 2004.
- Cotton, James. East Timor and Australia—25 years of the policy debate in East Timor and Australia. AIIA contributions to the policy debate, ed. J. Cotton, pp. 1–20. Canberra: Australian Defence Force Academy. 1999.
- Cristalis, Irena. East Timor. A nation's bitter dawn, 2nd ed. London: Zed Books. 2009.
- Fernandes, Clinton. The independence of East Timor. Multi-dimensional perspectives-occupation, resistance, and international political activism. Brighton: Sussex Academic Press. 2011.
- Fernandes, Francisco M. Radiografia de Timor Lorosae [A radiography of Timor Lorosae]. Macau: University of Saint Joseph. 2011.
- Fox, James. Diversity and differential development in East Timor: Potential problems and future possibilities. In East Timor. Development challenges for the world's newest nation, ed. Hal Hill and João Mariano Saldanha, pp. 155–173. Singapore: ISEAS and Asia Pacific Press. 2011.
- Fox, James. The articulation in tradition in Timor-Leste. In Democratic Governance in Timor-Leste: Reconciling the local and the national, ed. David Mearns, pp. 241–257. Darwin: Charles Darwin University Press. 2018.
- Gonçalves, S. Intergenerational perceptions of human rights in Timor-Leste: Memory, kultura and modernity. PhD thesis, University of Wollongong. 2015.
- Kingsbury, Damien. East Timor. The price of liberty. New York: Palgrave Macmillan. 2019.
- Molnar, Andrea. Timor Leste: Politics, history, and culture. London: Routledge. 2010.
- Ormeling, Ferdinand. The Timor problem: A geographical interpretation of an underdeveloped Island. Gravenhage: Martinus Nilhoff. 1956.
- Schulte Nordholt. The Political system of the Atoni of Timor. The Hague: Martinus Nijhoff, Ebook Springer. 1971.
- Smith, Michael. Peacekeeping in East Timor: The path to independence. Boulder, Co: Lynne Rienner. 2003.
