= Brazil–Timor-Leste relations =

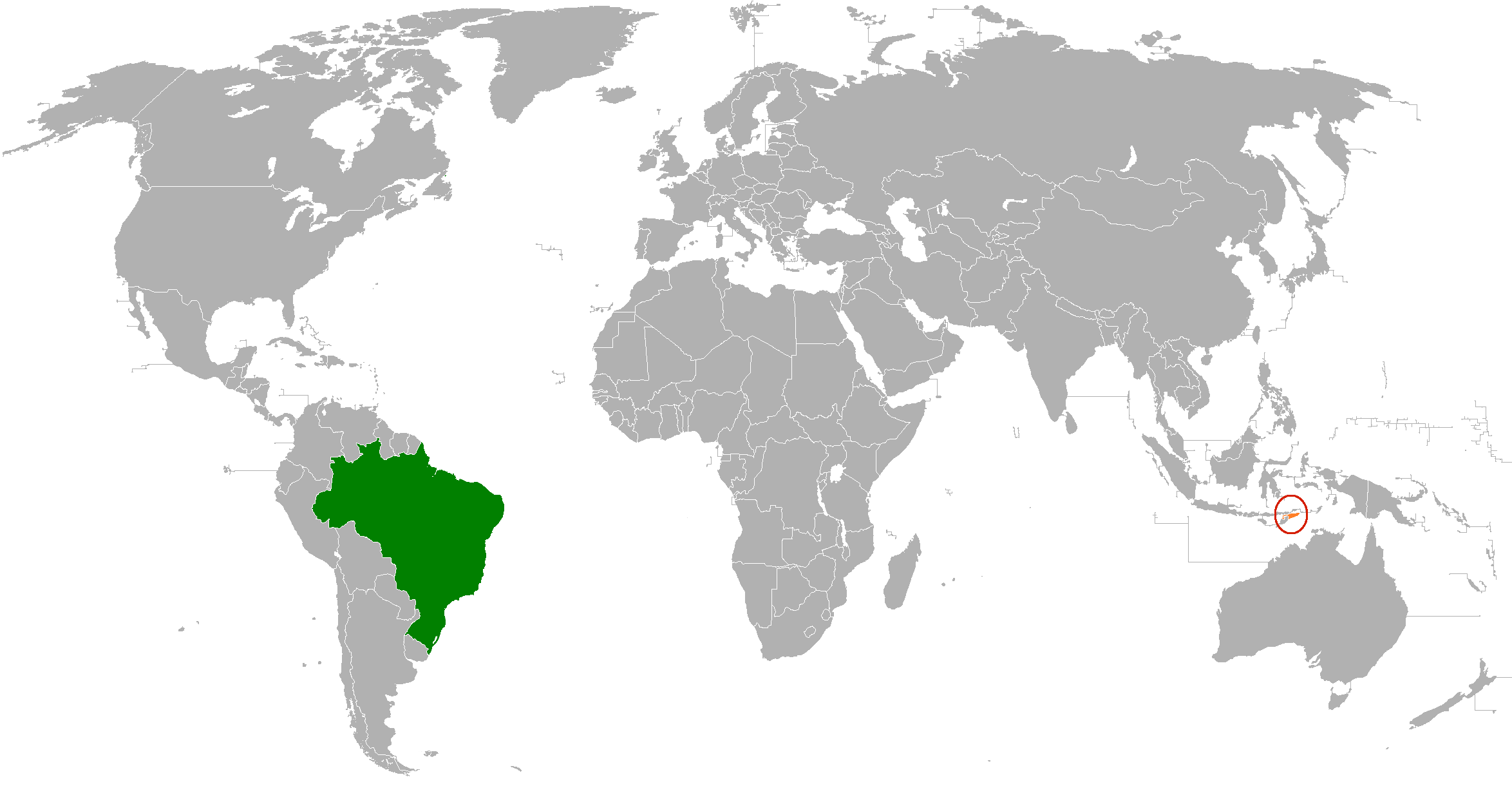

- Brazil: Timor-Leste

Brazil–Timor-Leste relations are the bilateral relations between Brazil and Timor-Leste. Brazil has an embassy in Dili and Timor-Leste has its own only South American embassy in Brasília. Both countries are members of the Community of Portuguese Language Countries. Due to their shared history as a Portuguese colony, Brazil and Timor-Leste have had formal relations since before Timor-Leste became an independent state in 2002. The predominant avenues for their relations are via economic capacity building programs provided by Brazil in Timor-Leste and as a part of both countries participation in the Community of Portuguese Language Countries. Brazil has been supportive of Timor-Leste's development as an independent democracy, and the two have cooperated on programs as diverse as technological training programs, Portuguese language instruction, and football.

== Political ties ==
Formal relations between Brazil and Timor-Leste began in 1999 before Timor-Leste became independent when the Brazilian government created a variety of programs to contribute to reconstruction. For example, the Brazilian Agency for Cooperation has facilitated economic capacity building programs, including training infrastructure departments, improving the capabilities of Timorese defense attorneys, prosecutors and judges in order to strengthen the judicial branch's capabilities and effectiveness (see Economic ties).

Brazil has also interacted with Timor-Leste via organizations they are both members of, such as the UN. In fact, since 1999, Brazil has participated in five peace keeping missions in Timor-Leste. Brazil's involvement in these missions is consistent with its contribution to interventions in Portuguese-speaking states, such as Mozambique and Angola. Increasing the country's stake in Timore-Leste's independence allowed Brazil “to actively demonstrate its independent foreign policy, its commitment to self-determination, and its expansion of economic ties with the Global South”.

Timor-Leste has received Brazilian presidents twice, once before official statehood and once after. Former President Fernando Henrique Cardoso visited the country in early 2001 to demonstrate Brazil's commitment "to the efforts towards building a democratic and stable Timor-Leste". During this visit, Cardoso laid the ground work for several cooperation and assistance initiatives.

In 2008, several significant events happened. In January, Former Timorese President José Ramos-Horta visited Brazil for the first time, and the spirit of the event reaffirmed the importance of collaboration between the two states. A few bilateral agreements were made, including the extension of an exchange program for Brazilian teachers to Timor-Leste and a commitment to train football coaches in Timor-Leste. It was also during this visit that Ramos-Horta announced the creation of an embassy in Brasília.

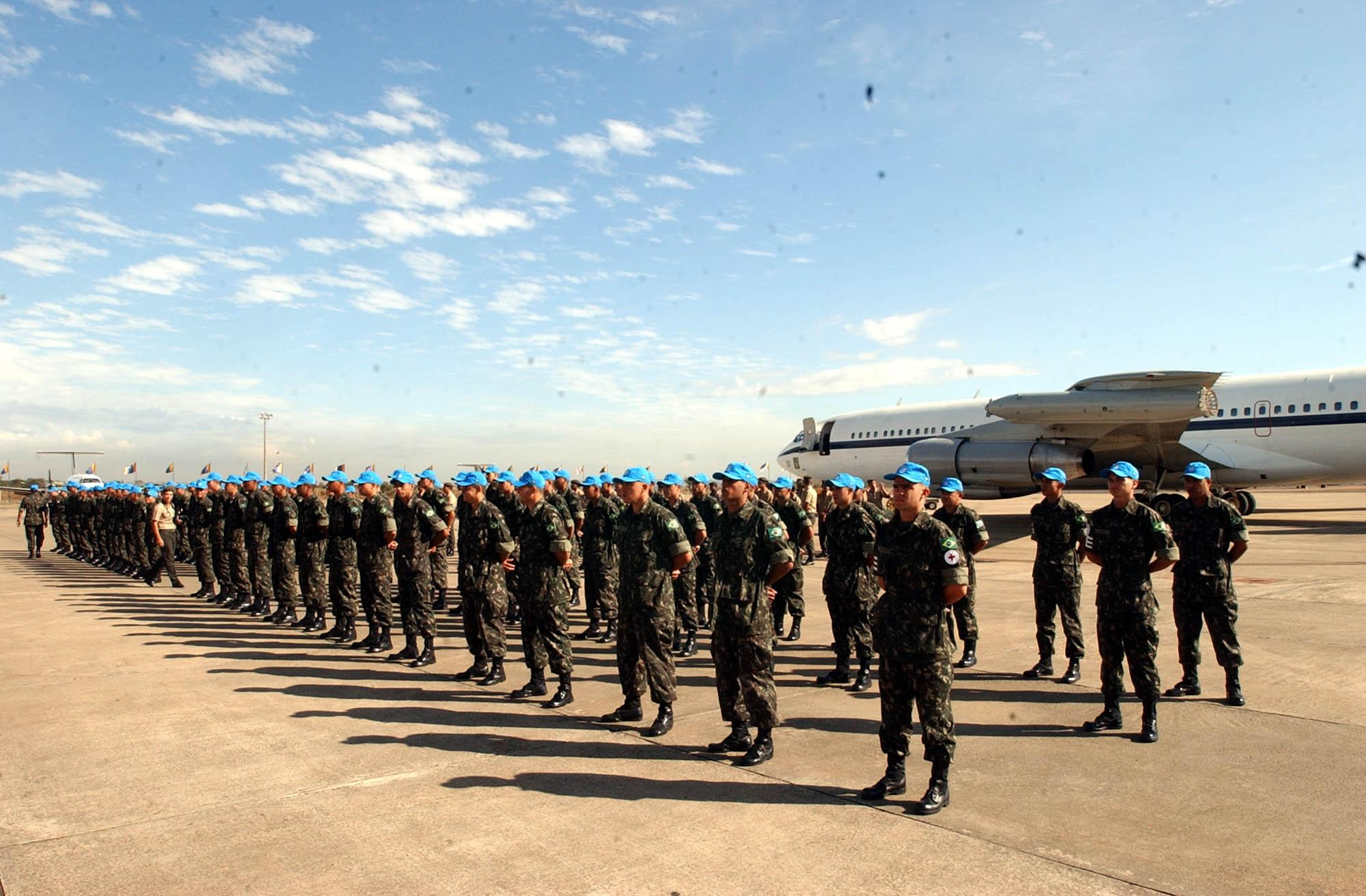
Brazilian troops in East Timor as part of United Nations Mission of Support to East Timor

Shortly after Ramos-Horta's return to Timor-Leste, an assassination attempt was carried out on him and Prime Minister Xanana Gusmão by renegade soldiers in what some have called a coup attempt. The attempt on Ramos-Horta's life in February prompted a public reaction on the international stage from Brazil. The Brazilian government, shocked and concerned for the security of the still new state, “strongly condemned the attacks” and rejected “all forms of violence as a method to settle political differences”. At the time, Brazil and Timor-Leste had more than a dozen cooperative programs in action. Ramos-Horta recovered within a matter of weeks and returned to office.

Several months afterward in July 2008, Former Brazilian President Luiz Inácio Lula da Silva visited Timor-Leste. During this trip, Lula expressed that the “bonds between Brazil and Timor-Leste are strong and reflect a deep sense of friendship and solidarity, as well as a shared heritage” in addition to signing six accords. As the first visit by another head of state after the attacks, it represented symbolic importance in addition to reaffirming cooperation programs on “agriculture, fisheries and judicial administration”.

== High-level visits ==
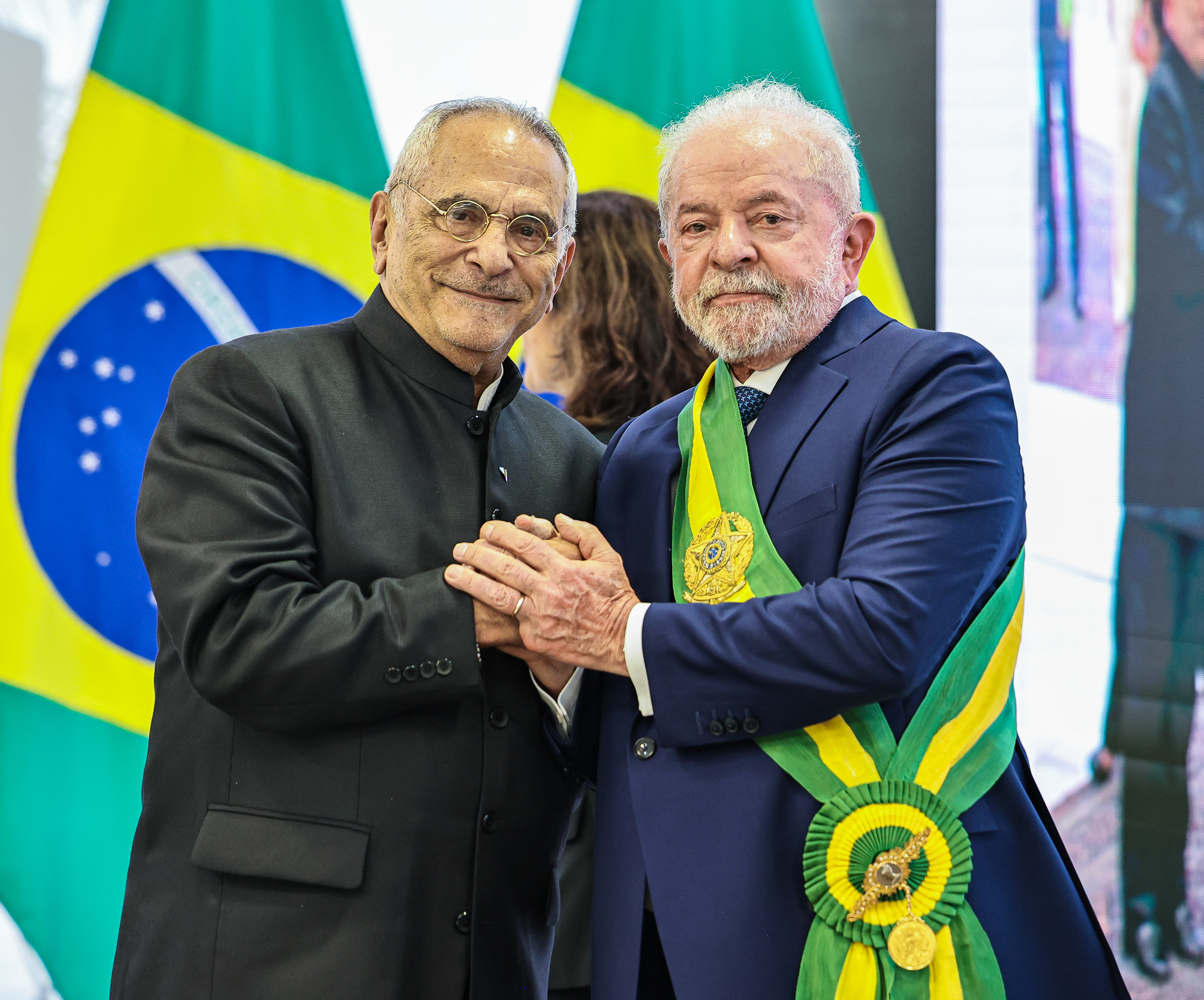
Timorese President José Ramos-Horta attending the inauguration of Brazilian President Luiz Inácio Lula da Silva in Brasília; January 2023.

High-level visits from Brazil to Timor-Leste

- President Fernando Henrique Cardoso (2001)
- Foreign Minister Celso Amorim (2007)
- President Luiz Inácio Lula da Silva (2008)
- Foreign Minister Mauro Vieira (2015)

High-level visits from Timor-Leste to Brazil

- President Xanana Gusmão (2002)
- Foreign Minister José Ramos-Horta (2004)
- President José Ramos-Horta (2008, 2023)
- Prime Minister Xanana Gusmão (2011)

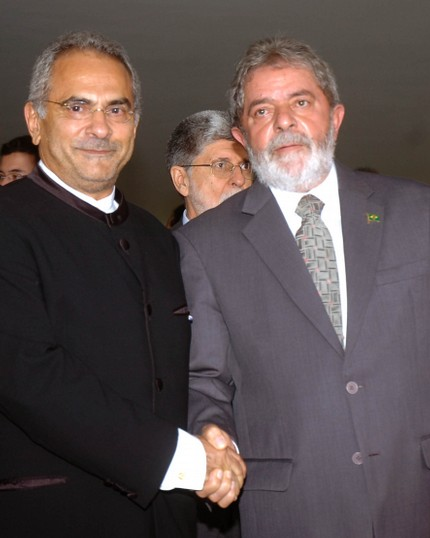
President Luiz Inácio Lula da Silva and President José Ramos-Horta; 2008.

President Dilma Rousseff and Prime Minister Xanana Gusmão in Brasília; March 2011.

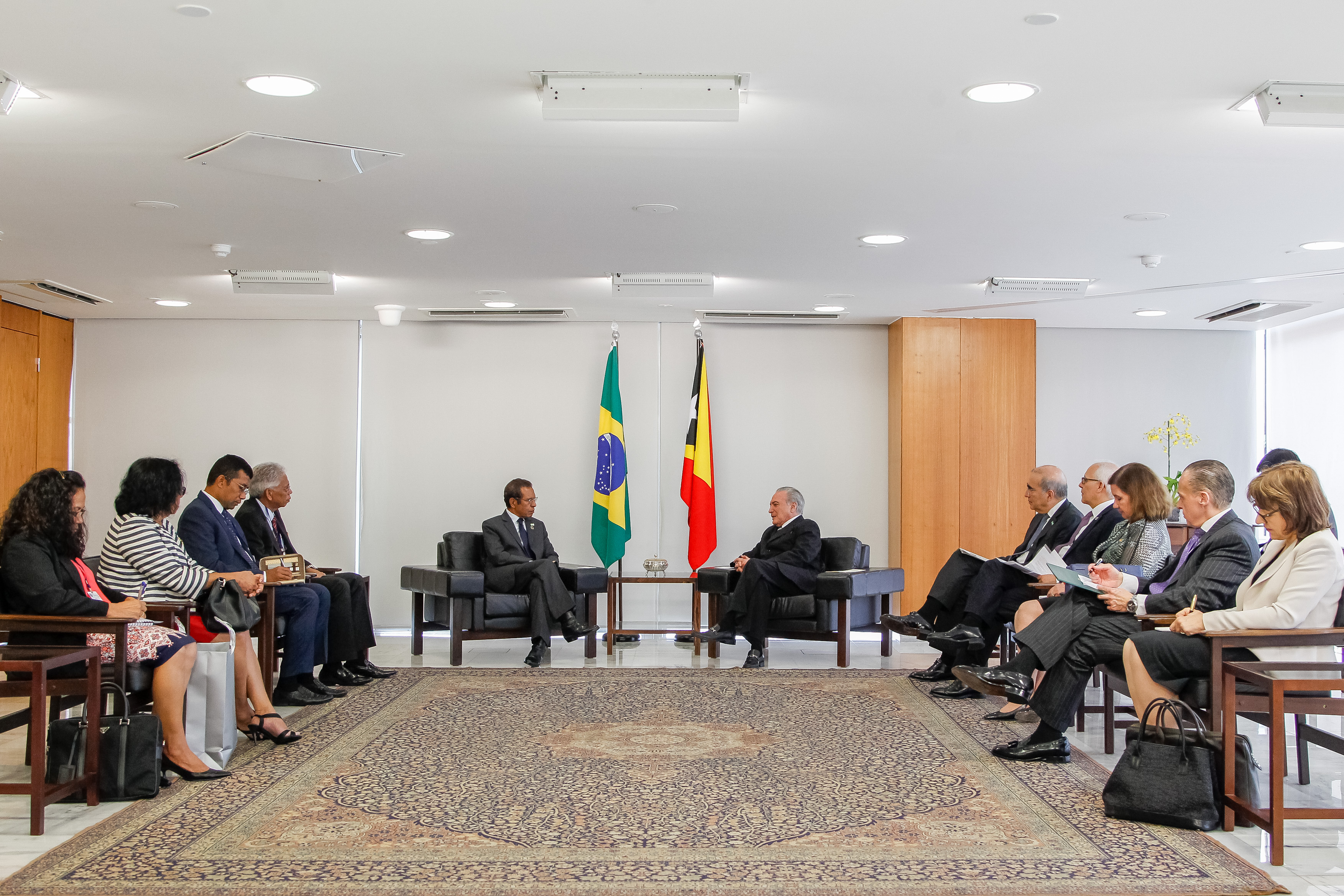
President Taur Matan Ruak and President Michel Temer in Lisbon; October 2016.

== Economic relations ==
These support programs primarily focused on economic development (see below) and assistance with infrastructure, such as training civil engineers and developing the electricity system. For example, one project established a center to enhance the human capital in technical professions and by the end of 2011 had trained 2200 professionals in the above industries. However, a significant commitment between the two states has been the Brazil Technical Cooperation Program (Programa de Cooperação Técnica Brasil), which includes $8 million invested in training programs on ten thematic areas: labor, justice, national security, culture, agriculture, education, governance, sports, the environment and health. Examples of some of these programs in education are:

- PROCAPES: aims to ensure that teachers have sufficient teaching materials in Portuguese
- ELPI: offers resources and education to Portuguese language teachers
- PG-UNTL: a post-graduate program for administration and management in education for principles and other post-graduate degrees in education.
- PROFEP: trains unlicensed high school teachers to improve teaching quality and practices

These programs and others are ongoing, and are intended to continue for the foreseeable future, with potential for additional projects focusing on the justice system, education, agriculture, and others.

However, trade between the two states is relatively low. Only 0.39% of Timor-Leste's imports come from Brazil and it exports nearly nothing to Brazil. Further, Brazil's exports to and imports from Timor-Leste are so low as to register as 0% of Brazil's foreign.

== Cultural relations ==
The shared Portuguese language has been an important linkage between these two states. As mentioned above, the Brazilian government has facilitated training programs for Portuguese language teachers to work with Portuguese teachers in Timor-Leste. Brazil's commitment to this program has appeared several times in the relations between these states.

Due to their shared history as Portuguese colonies, both Brazil and Timor-Leste are member states of the Community of Portuguese Language Countries. The CPLP not only acts as a cultural tie, but also as a political bloc for political cooperation with the following general objectives: political and diplomatic coordination, namely to reinforce its presence on the international stage; cooperation on a variety of governance areas; creation of project to promote the diffusion of the Portuguese language. For example, the Tenth Summit of Heads of State and Government of the Community of Portuguese Language Countries was held in July 2014 in Dili, Timor-Leste. Key policies resulting from this summit included the launch of Juntos Contra A Fome (Together Against Hunger) and the accession of Equatorial Guinea to the organization.

An interesting note is the involvement of a prominent Brazilian born diplomat, Sérgio Vieira de Mello during the establishment of Timor-Leste as an independent state. Acting as the Special Representative of the Secretary General overseeing the transition to peace, Vieira de Mello spent three years overseeing the successful effort to build the state's institutional framework. The Timorese Parliament even established a Sérgio Vieira de Mello Human Rights Award.

== Resident diplomatic missions ==
- Brazil has an embassy in Dili.
- Timor-Leste has an embassy in Brasília.

== See also ==
- Lusophony Games
- Foreign relations of Timor-Leste
- United Kingdom of Portugal, Brazil and the Algarves
- Foreign relations of Brazil
