= Portugal–Timor-Leste relations =

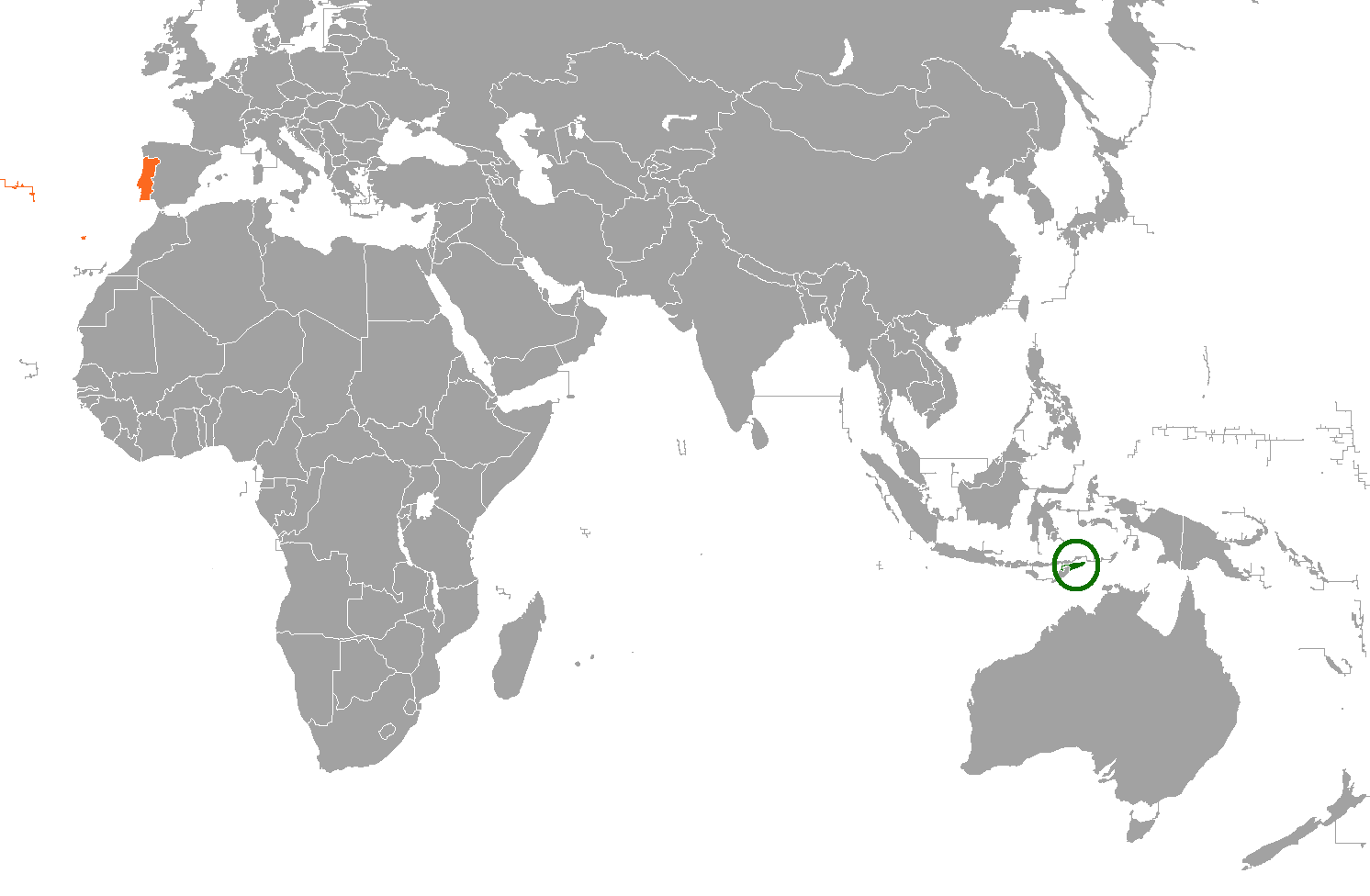

- Timor-Leste: Portugal

Portugal–Timor-Leste relations are foreign relations between Portugal and Timor-Leste (formerly East Timor). Timor-Leste has an embassy in Lisbon whilst Portugal has an embassy in Dili. East Timor was a colony of Portugal for over 400 years. Both countries belong to the Community of Portuguese Language Countries.

== History ==
The Portuguese, in search of spices, first settled Timor in 1520. By the 17th century, the Dutch arrived, settling the western half of the island of Timor. A treaty in 1859 formalized the division. East Timor is a predominantly Roman Catholic region, a legacy of Portugal's rule Portugal had effective control of East Timor only after the second half of the 20th century.

Following fighting between rival groups seeking independence from Portugal, Indonesia invaded East Timor and annexed it in 1976 after East Timor declared itself independent from Portugal on 28 November 1975. The invasion resulted in Portugal severing diplomatic ties with Indonesia.

In 1987, then Portuguese Prime Minister Aníbal Cavaco Silva accused Indonesia of abusing the "most elementary human rights" in East Timor and of preparing to rig upcoming elections in East Timor. Cavaco Silva went on to say that his government supported self determination for East Timor.

In the early 1990s, the UN still regarded Portugal as the administrative authority in East Timor. For their part, Portuguese officials saw a "moral obligation" to continue involvement in the affairs of a former colony. Portugal tried to get the Indonesian government to agree to a settlement, and even independence, for East Timor. However, Indonesia refused the offer because of fears that other secessionist movements could be emboldened.

== State visits ==
In 2007 and 2010, East Timorese President José Ramos Horta (who himself is half Portuguese) visited Portuguese Prime Minister José Sócrates. Sócrates said that Portugal will strengthen relations with Timor-Leste in various sectors, including education, justice, technology and politics, adding that those sectors are vital for Timor-Leste's future.

== Portuguese aid ==
Portugal is the biggest aid donor to Timor-Leste, having granted over US$350 million since it voted for independence from Indonesia in 1999.

== Agreements ==
In 2005, the two countries signed a programme on military-technical cooperation.

== Security assistance ==
Following the outbreak of violence in 2006, then East Timorese Foreign Minister, José Ramos Horta, asked for troops and police to be sent from Australia, New Zealand, Malaysia and Portugal to help calm unrest around Dili.

Prime Minister José Sócrates said that Portugal was planning to send a contingent of paramilitary police to Timor-Leste if the mandate of the United Nations mission there was extended. Later that month, Portuguese President Aníbal Cavaco Silva said the situation in Timor-Leste was very serious, and Portugal would unite with the East Timorese people and do all it could to restore peace. Portugal then sent a detachment of its Republican National Guard of 120 military police. By November 2006, Timor-Leste made a formal request to the UN and Portuguese government for the doubling of police numbers. The commitment of military police is ongoing in Timor-Leste. In 2007, President José Ramos Horta said after meeting his Portuguese counterpart that Timor-Leste will need international forces to maintain security for "another few years".

== Resident diplomatic missions ==
- Portugal has an embassy in Dili.
- Timor-Leste has an embassy in Lisbon.
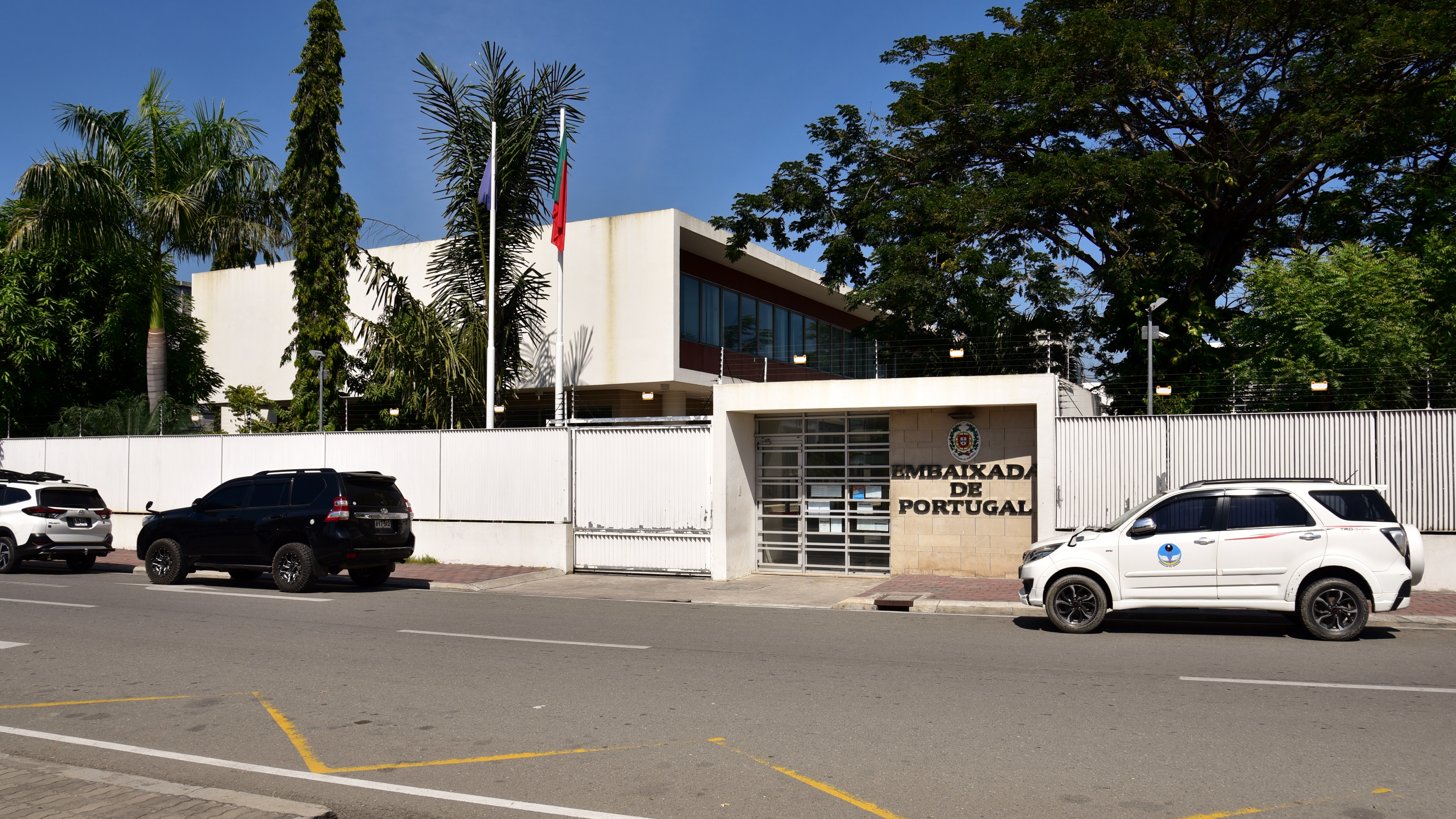
Embassy of Portugal in Dili

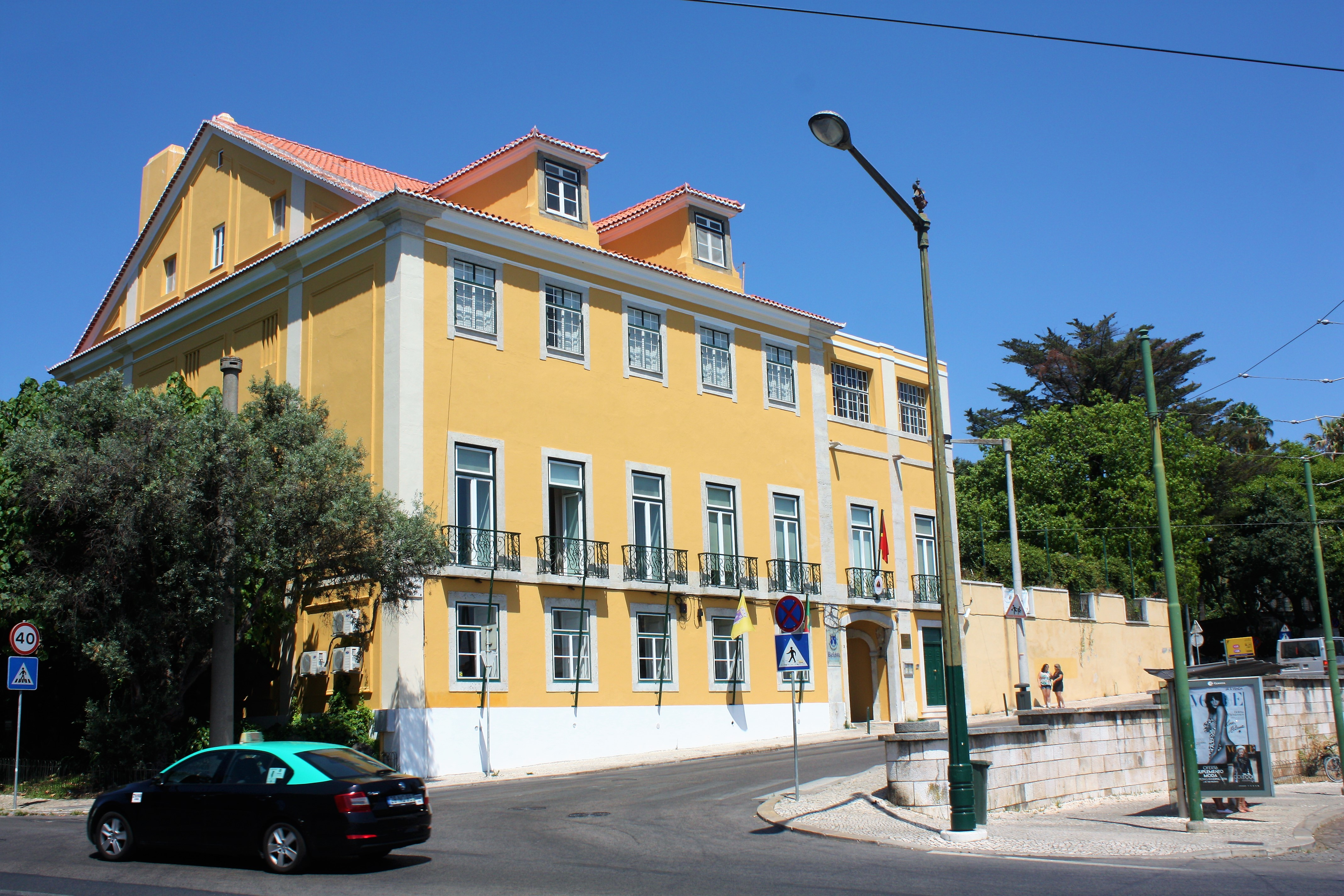
Embassy of Timor-Leste in Lisbon

== See also ==
- Foreign relations of Timor-Leste
- Foreign relations of Portugal
- Portuguese people
