= Kosovo–Timor-Leste relations =

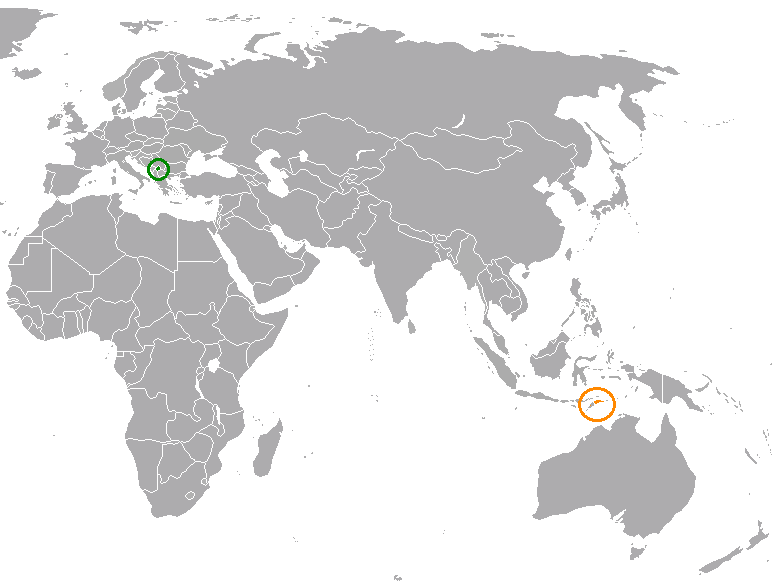

- Kosovo: Timor-Leste

Diplomatic mission
- Embassy of Kosovo, Canberra: n/a

Envoy
- Jetmira Bërdynaj: n/a

Kosovo–Timor-Leste relations are the bilateral relations between Kosovo and Timor-Leste.

== History ==
Timor-Leste recognized Kosovo as an independent, sovereign state on 20 September 2012. The two states established formal diplomatic relations on 9 March 2022.

Both countries have previously been under United Nations administration, East Timor between 1999 and 2002 and Kosovo between 1999 and unilaterally declaring independence in 2008.

== Representation ==
Kosovo is represented in Timor-Leste by a non-resident ambassador based in Canberra, Australia.
