= Richard Muckermann =

German politician (1891–1981)

Member of the Bundestag
- In office 7 September 1949 – 15 October 1961

Personal details
- Born: 28 November 1891
- Died: 2 February 1981 (aged 89)
- Party: CDU
- Occupation: Politician

Richard Muckermann (28 November 1891 – 2 February 1981) was a German politician of the Christian Democratic Union (CDU) and former member of the German Bundestag.

== Life ==
In the first state elections in North Rhine-Westphalia in 1947, Muckermann won a mandate for the Center, which he continued to hold until the end of the legislative period on 17 June 1950, even after his move to the CDU. On behalf of the Christian Democrats, he entered the German Bundestag in the first federal elections in 1949 and was a member of parliament until 1961. He was always directly elected in the Neuss - Grevenbroich constituency.

== Literature ==
Herbst, Ludolf; Jahn, Bruno (2002). Vierhaus, Rudolf (ed.). Biographisches Handbuch der Mitglieder des Deutschen Bundestages. 1949–2002 [Biographical Handbook of the Members of the German Bundestag. 1949–2002] (in German). München: De Gruyter - De Gruyter Saur. p. 1715. ISBN 978-3-11-184511-1.
