= Israel–Timor-Leste relations =

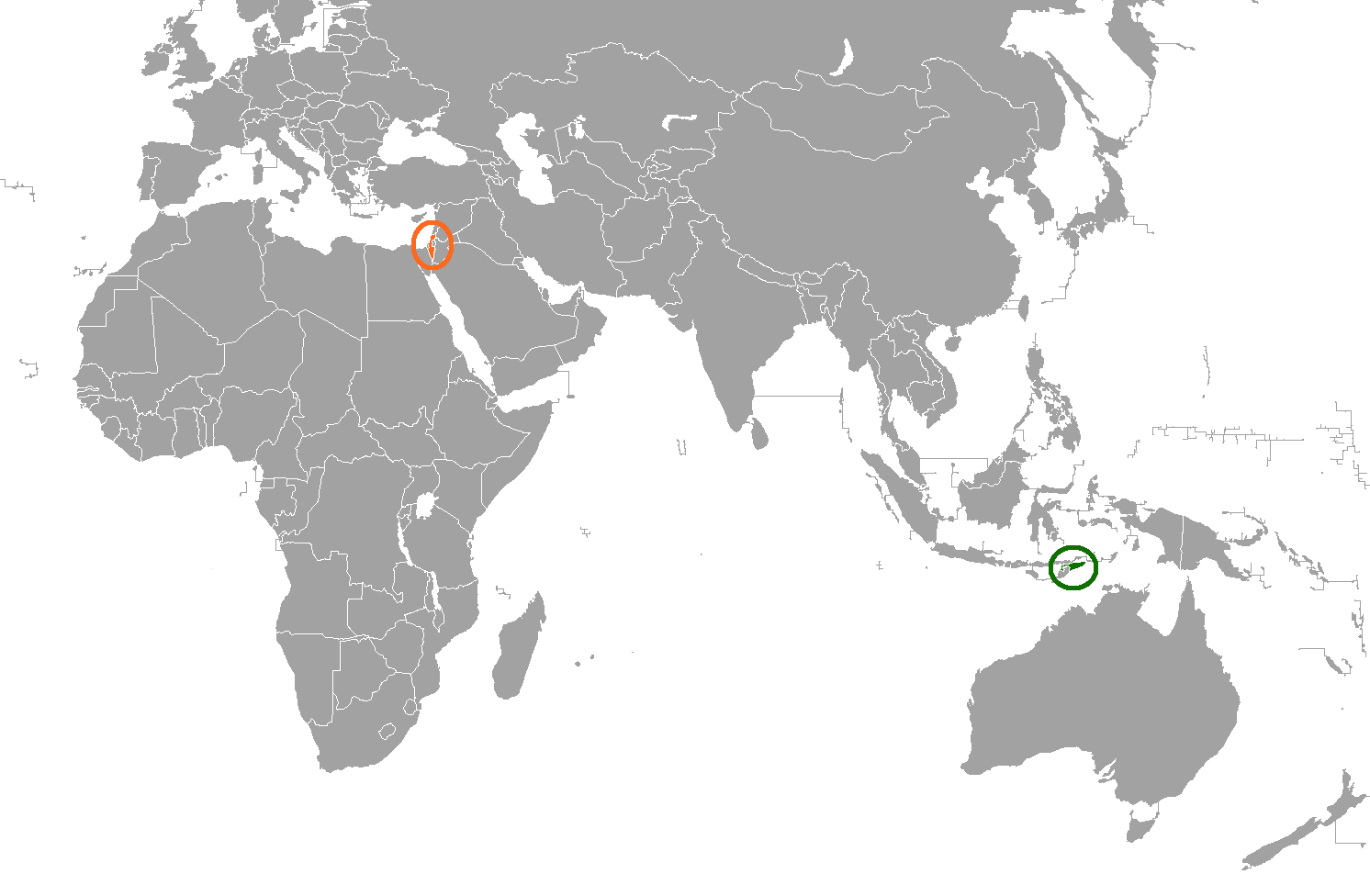

- Timor-Leste: Israel

Diplomatic mission
- Embassy of Israel in Singapore: -

Envoy
- Non-resident Ambassador Eliyahu Vered Hazan: -

Israel–Timor-Leste relations refers to diplomatic ties between Timor-Leste and Israel.

== History ==
Timor-Leste established diplomatic relations with the State of Israel in August 2002. Israel is represented in Timor-Leste through its embassy in Singapore.

President of Timor-Leste, José Ramos-Horta, visited Israel in 2011. He also delivered a lecture to students at the Hebrew University of Jerusalem. While in Israel, Horta met with Israeli president Shimon Peres. Timor-Leste is particularly interested in strategic cooperation with Israel in the spheres of agriculture and naval security.

Eli Vered Hazan is Israel's non resident ambassador to Timor-Leste based in Singapore.

== See also ==
- List of ambassadors of Israel to Timor-Leste
