= Bijan Djir-Sarai =

German politician (born 1976)

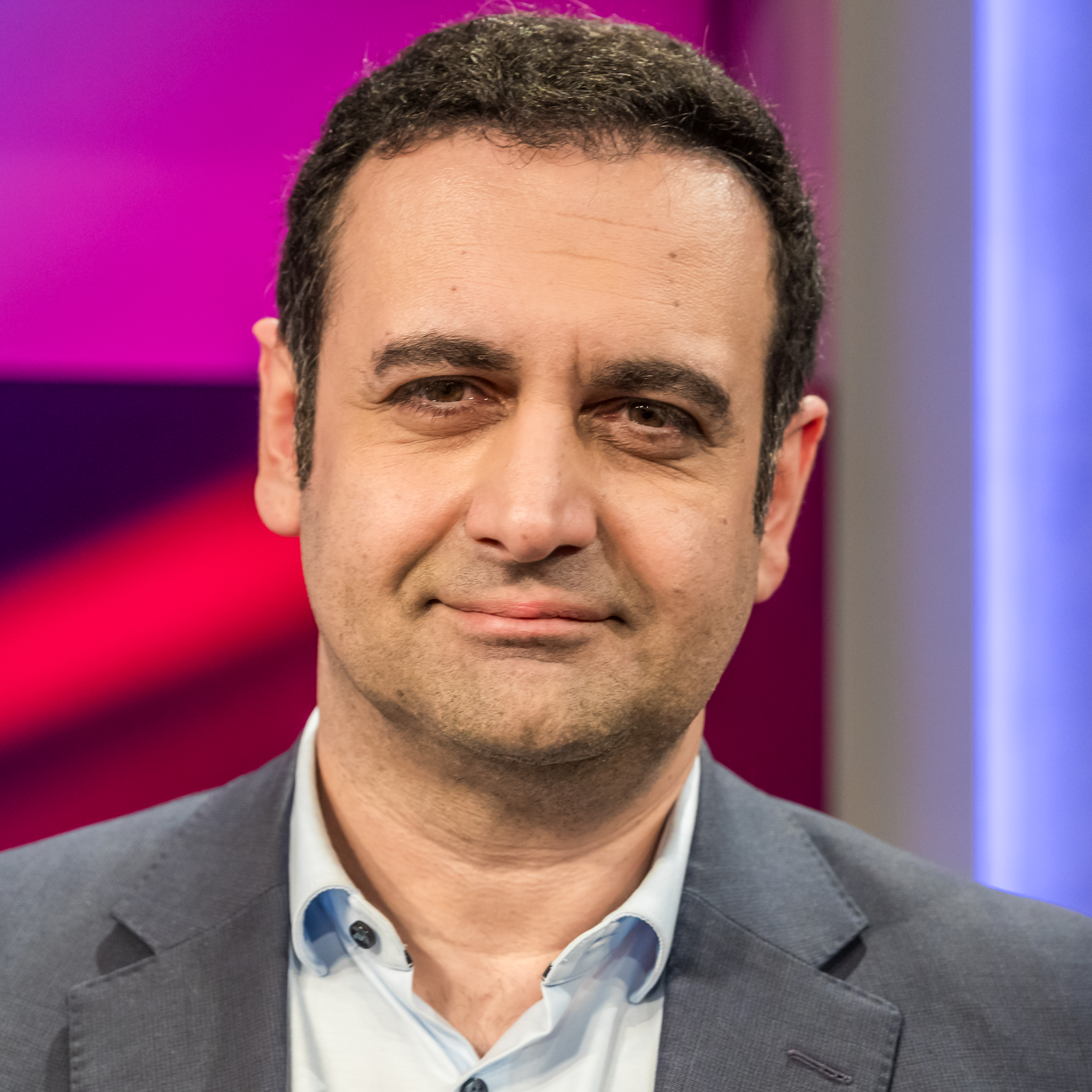

Member of the Bundestag for Nordrhein-Westfalen
- In office 24 October 2017 – November 2024
- In office 27 October 2009 – 22 September 2013

Personal details
- Born: 6 June 1976 (age 50) Tehran, Iran
- Citizenship: German
- Party: Free Democratic Party (FDP)
- Education: University of Cologne
- Occupation: Politician

Bijan Djir-Sarai (Persian: بیژن جیرسرایی; born 6 June 1976) is a German politician of the Free Democratic Party (FDP) who has served as a member of the Bundestag from 2009 until 2013 and since 2017 until March 2025.

== Background and education ==
Djir-Sarai was born on 6 June 1976 in Tehran. He was sent to Germany to live with an uncle at the age of 11 by his Iranian family. He is a member of the Protestant Church. The University of Cologne withdrew Djir-Sarai's doctoral degree on 5 March 2012 because his thesis did not sufficiently cite its sources.

== Political career ==
Djir-Sarai joined the FDP in 1996. He first became a member of the German Parliament in the 2009 elections. From 2009 and 2013, he served on the Committee on Foreign Relations. In the 2013 elections, he lost his mandate.

Djir-Sarai was re-elected in the 2017 elections and subsequently served on the Committee on Foreign Affairs again. He served as his parliamentary group's spokesperson on foreign policy. In addition to his committee assignments, he chaired the German-Iranian Parliamentary Friendship Group.

In the negotiations to form a so-called traffic light coalition of the Social Democratic Party (SPD), the Green Party and the FDP following the 2021 federal elections, Djir-Sarai was part of his party's delegation in the working group on foreign policy, defence, development cooperation and human rights, co-chaired by Heiko Maas, Omid Nouripour and Alexander Graf Lambsdorff. In April 2022 he was elected as the General Secretary of the FDP. He resigned from the position on 29 November 2024 amid controversy over the FDP's departure from the governing coalition.

== Other activities ==
=== Corporate boards ===
- Sparkasse Neuss, Member of the Supervisory Board

=== Non-profit organizations ===
- Walther Rathenau Institute, Member of the Board (since 2022)
- Europa-Union Deutschland (EUD), Member
- German Council on Foreign Relations (DGAP), Member of the Steering Committee

== Political positions ==
Djir-Sarai opposes Boycott, Divestment and Sanctions (BDS) against Israel and favors the recognition of Hezbollah as a terrorist organization.

In a joint letter initiated by Norbert Röttgen and Anthony Gonzalez ahead of the 47th G7 summit in 2021, Djir-Sarai joined some 70 legislators from Europe and the US in calling upon their leaders to take a tough stance on China and to "avoid becoming dependent" on the country for technology including artificial intelligence and 5G.
