= Mexico–Timor-Leste relations =

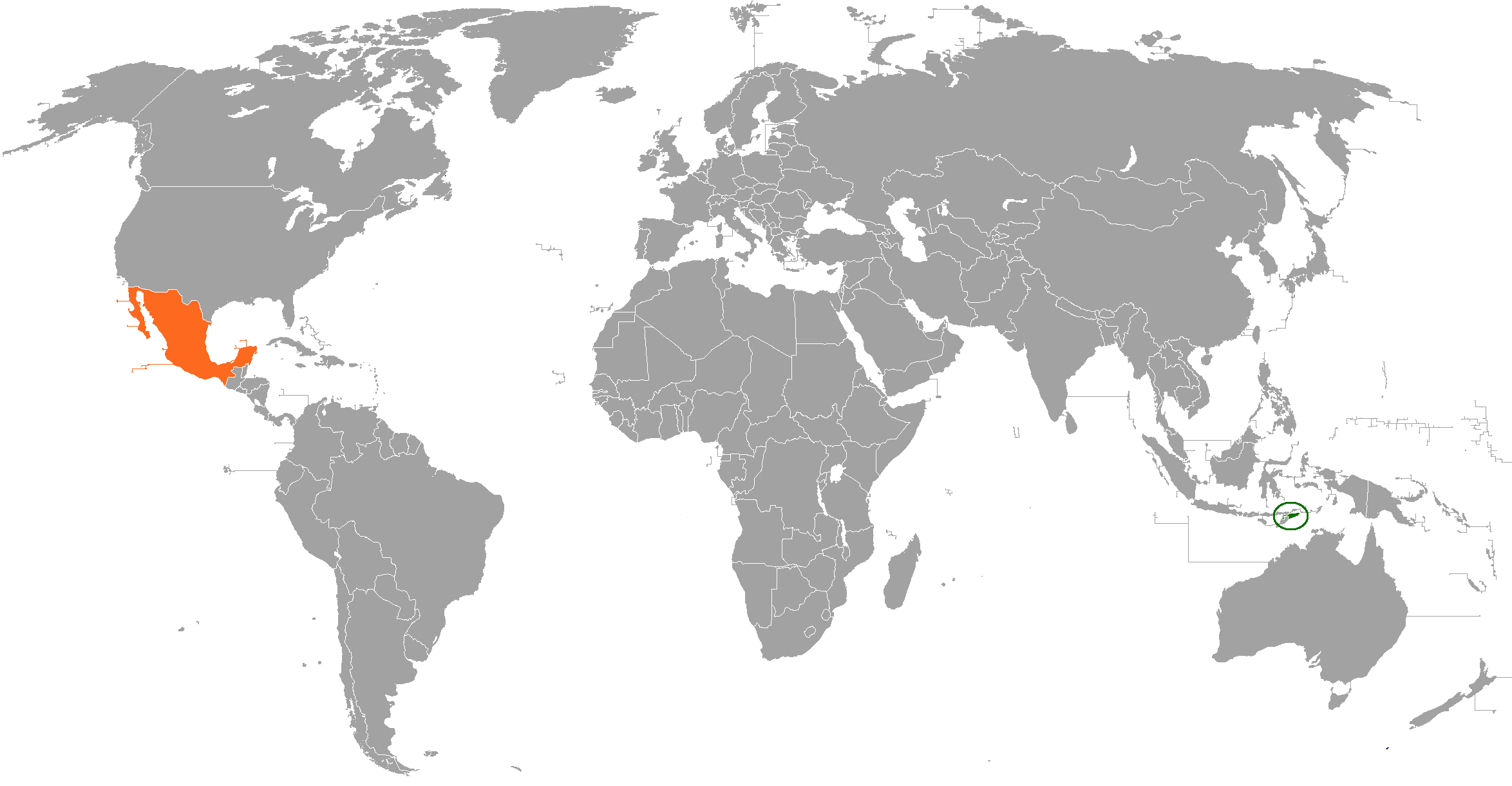

- Timor-Leste: Mexico

The nations of Mexico and Timor-Leste established diplomatic relations in 2003. Both nations are members of the United Nations.

== History ==
During the 1999 East Timorese independence referendum, violence in East Timor (Timor-Leste) intensified. Internal pressure led UNAMET to work in forced marches until 30 August 1999, the day the referendum was to take place. To conduct the referendum, the United Nations requested Mexico's Federal Electoral Institute to provide technical assistance to East Timor in two specific areas, in the creation of an electoral registry and in the logistics for the elections. Mexico's support began in June and ended in August of the same year.

On 20 May 2002, Timor-Leste obtained its independence from Indonesia. The independence ceremony was attended by Mexican Foreign Undersecretary Miguel Marín Bosch. Mexico immediately recognized the independence of Timor-Leste, becoming the second Latin American nation to do so. As a non-permanent member of the United Nations Security Council, Mexico approved Resolution 1414 to admit Timor-Leste to the United Nations. On 26 September 2003, both nations established diplomatic relations.

In May 2008, East Timorese Foreign Minister Zacarias da Costa paid an official visit to Mexico, becoming the highest-level government official from Timor-Leste to visit Mexico. During a meeting with Mexican Foreign Minister Patricia Espinosa Cantellano, both nations discussed an interest in strengthening the bilateral relationship between both nations. Both ministers agreed to cooperate within the framework of the UN, where issues of common interest could be found. In 2010, East Timorese Minister of the Economy, João Mendes Goncalves, attended the United Nations Climate Change Conference in Cancún.

In 2023, both nations celebrated 20 years of diplomatic relations.

== High-level visits ==
High-level visits from Mexico to Timor-Leste

- Foreign Undersecretary Miguel Marín Bosch (2002)

High-level visits from Timor-Leste to Mexico

- Foreign Minister Zacarias da Costa (2008)
- Minister of the Economy João Mendes Goncalves (2010)

== Trade ==
In 2021, trade between Mexico and Timor-Leste totaled US$164 thousand dollars. Timor-Leste's main exports to Mexico include: power transformers, air pumps and plastic articles. Mexico does not have any registered exports to Timor-Leste.

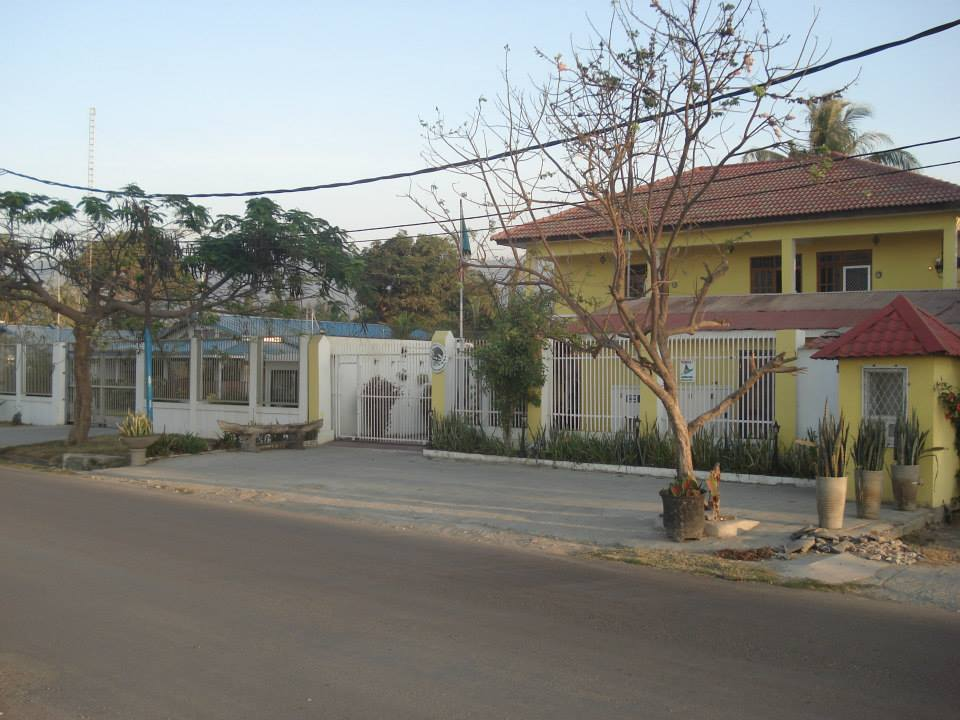
Honorary consulate of Mexico in Dili

== Diplomatic missions ==
- Mexico is accredited to Timor-Leste from its embassy in Jakarta, Indonesia and maintains an honorary consulate in Dili.
- Timor-Leste is accredited to Mexico from its embassy in Washington, D.C., United States.
