= Heinz Günther Hüsch =

German politician (1929–2023)

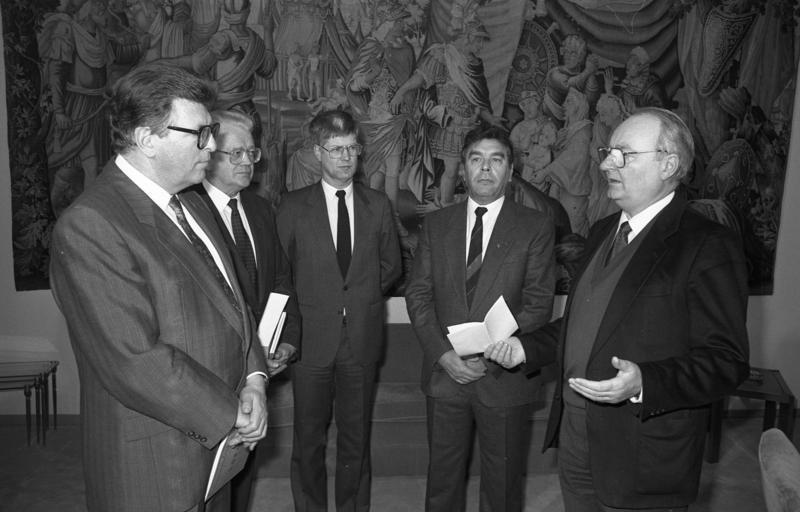
- Hüsch (right) in 1987

Member of the Bundestag
- In office 14 December 1976 – 20 December 1990

Personal details
- Born: 13 June 1929 Heinsberg, Rhine Province, Prussia, Germany
- Died: 24 October 2023 (aged 94) Neuss, North Rhine-Westphalia, Germany
- Party: CDU
- Education: University of Cologne
- Occupation: Lawyer

Heinz Günther Hüsch (13 June 1929 – 24 October 2023) was a German lawyer, and politician. A member of the Christian Democratic Union, he served in the Bundestag from 1976 to 1990.

Hüsch died in Neuss on 24 October 2023, at the age of 94.
