= Poonam Khetrapal Singh =

Former Regional director of WHO south-east Asia

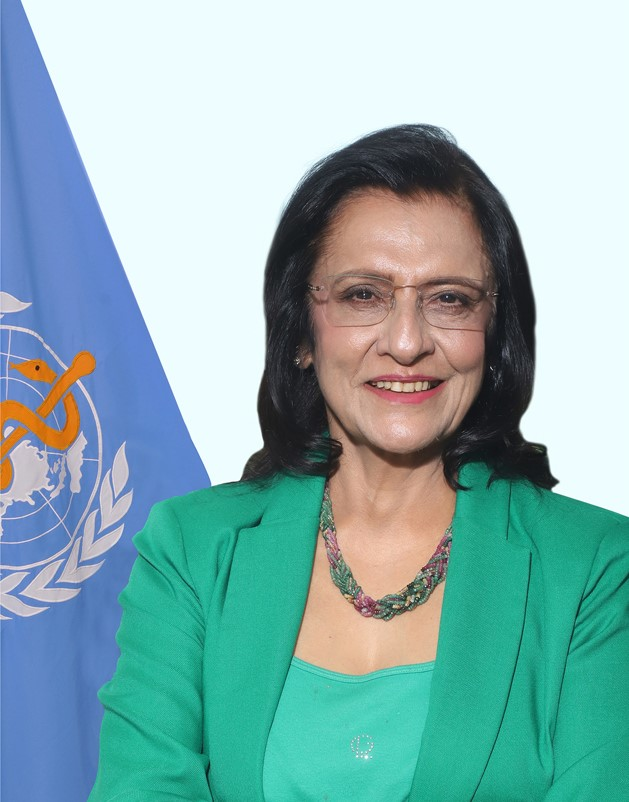

Poonam Khetrapal Singh (Hindi: पूनम खेत्रपाल सिंह) is the first Indian elected Regional Director of WHO’s South-East Asia Region. She was also the first woman in the region to assume the office of WHO Regional Director for South-East Asia in February 2014. In September 2018, she was unanimously elected for a second five-year term by the 71st Regional Committee and 144th Session of the WHO Executive Board.

== Education and early career ==
Singh has a PhD in Public Health and is a Fellow of the Royal College of Physicians (FRCP) of the University of Edinburgh.

Prior to her service as Regional Director of the WHO South-East Asia Region, for over two decades she was a civil servant in India as a member of the Indian Administrative Services (IAS) belonging to the 1975 Batch. This included roles as Secretary of the Department of Health and Family Welfare; Secretary of the Department of Personnel and General Administration; Managing Director of Punjab Financial Corporation and Punjab Industrial development corporations in the State of Punjab. She has also worked in the Health, Population and Nutrition Department of The World Bank and joined WHO headquarters in 1998 as Executive Director, Sustainable Development and Healthy Environments Cluster, and a member of the Director-General’s Cabinet. Dr Singh was the first Indian Women to serve as an Executive Director at WHO headquarters in Geneva. In February 2013, she joined the Government of India’s Ministry of Health & Family Welfare as Advisor for International Health, where her principal task was to strengthen global health outcomes and to take forward the international health agenda.

== Regional Director of WHO South-East Asia ==
Singh’s term as the regional director of the South-East Asia Region of the World Health Organization is defined by the maxim "Sustain. Accelerate. Innovate." Each element complements her original "One by Four" plan and the seven (later eight) Flagship Priorities that have anchored region-wide progress since 2014.

Her term ended in 2023, and she was succeeded by Saima Wazed, who took over the position as the new Regional Director.

== Honours ==
- National Order of Merit (Bhutan), First Class (17 December 2023).

== Selected works and publications ==
- Jhalani, Manoj; Khetrapal Singh, Poonam (2020). "Safeguarding essential health services during emergencies: Lessons learnt from the COVID-19 pandemic". WHO South-East Asia Journal of Public Health. 9 (2): 93–94. doi:10.4103/2224-3151.293433. PMID 32978338. S2CID 221939967.
- Ofrin, Rodericoh; Khetrapal Singh, Poonam (2020). "Quo vadis after COVID-19: A new path for global emergency preparedness?". WHO South-East Asia Journal of Public Health. 9 (1): 1–4. doi:10.4103/2224-3151.282988. PMID 32341214. S2CID 216594279.
- Singh, Poonamkhetrapal (2020). "The research community must meet the coronavirus disease 2019 challenge". Indian Journal of Medical Research. 151 (2): 116–117. doi:10.4103/ijmr.IJMR_832_20. PMC 7357404. PMID 32270770.
- Singh, Poonam Khetrapal (2020). "Sustain, accelerate, innovate: The burden of liver disease and way forward in the WHO South-East Asia region". The Lancet Gastroenterology & Hepatology. 5 (2): 100–102. doi:10.1016/S2468-1253(19)30318-8. PMID 31852631. S2CID 209418746.
- Landry, Mark; Singh, Poonamkhetrapal (2019). "Harnessing the potential of digital health in the WHO South-East Asia Region: Sustaining what works, accelerating scale-up and innovating frontier technologies". WHO South-East Asia Journal of Public Health. 8 (2): 67–70. doi:10.4103/2224-3151.264848. PMID 31441439. S2CID 201618119.
- Arinaminpathy, Nimalan; Mandal, Sandip; Bhatia, Vineet; McLeod, Ross; Sharma, Mukta; Swaminathan, Soumya; Hyder, Khurshidalam; Mandal, Parthapratim; Sarkar, Swarupkumar; Singh, Poonamkhetrapal (2019). "Strategies for ending tuberculosis in the South-East Asian Region: A modelling approach". Indian Journal of Medical Research. 149 (4): 517–527. doi:10.4103/ijmr.IJMR_1901_18. PMC 6676838. PMID 31411176.
- Travis, Phyllida; Khetrapal Singh, Poonam (2019). "Time to deliver: Accelerating more equitable access to better quality primary health-care services in the WHO South-East Asia Region". WHO South-East Asia Journal of Public Health. 8 (1): 1–3. doi:10.4103/2224-3151.255341. PMID 30950422. S2CID 96435422.
- Travis, Phyllida; Khetrapal Singh, Poonam (2018). "Accelerating access to essential medicines in the WHO South-East Asia Region: Opportunities for greater engagement and better evidence". WHO South-East Asia Journal of Public Health. 7 (2): 59–61. doi:10.4103/2224-3151.239414. PMID 30136661. S2CID 52070651.
- Qadri, Firdausi; Azad, Abul Kalam; Flora, Meerjady Sabrina; Khan, Ashraful Islam; Islam, Md Taufiqul; Nair, G Balakrish; Singh, Poonam Khetrapal; Clemens, John D. (2018). "Emergency deployment of oral cholera vaccine for the Rohingya in Bangladesh". The Lancet. 391 (10133): 1877–1879. doi:10.1016/S0140-6736(18)30993-0. PMID 29781432. S2CID 29159499.
- Travis, Phyllida; Singh, Poonamkhetrapal (2018). "Universal health coverage in the World Health Organization South-East Asia Region: How can we make it "business unusual"?". WHO South-East Asia Journal of Public Health. 7 (1): 1–4. doi:10.4103/2224-3151.228420. PMID 29582842. S2CID 4386789.
- Singh, Poonam Khetrapal (2018). "Towards ending viral hepatitis as a public health threat: Translating new momentum into concrete results in South-East Asia". Gut Pathogens. 10: 9. doi:10.1186/s13099-018-0237-x. PMC 5836424. PMID 29515657.
- Sundar, Sudha; Khetrapal-Singh, Poonam; Frampton, Jon; Trimble, Edward; Rajaraman, Preetha; Mehrotra, Ravi; Hariprasad, Roopa; Maitra, Arindam; Gill, Paramjit; Suri, Vanita; Srinivasan, Radhika; Singh, Gurpreet; Thakur, J. S.; Dhillon, Preet; Cazier, Jean-Baptiste (2018). "Harnessing genomics to improve outcomes for women with cancer in India: Key priorities for research" (PDF). The Lancet Oncology. 19 (2): e102–e112. doi:10.1016/S1470-2045(17)30726-X. PMID 29413464. S2CID 206145439. (Erratum: doi:10.1016/S1470-2045(18)30330-9, PMID 29893259)
- Thamarangsi, Thaksaphon; Singh, Poonamkhetrapal (2017). "Accelerating tobacco control in South-East Asia in the sustainable development goal era". Indian Journal of Public Health. 61 (5): S1–S2. doi:10.4103/ijph.IJPH_229_17. PMID 28928310. S2CID 4858166.
- Singh, Poonam Khetrapal (2017). "Global Response to Combat Antimicrobial Resistance". Indian Journal of Medical Microbiology. 35 (1): 1–3. doi:10.4103/ijmm.IJMM_17_98. PMID 28303809. S2CID 31074799.
- Nadda, Jagat Prakash; Singh, Poonam Khetrapal (2016). "New evidence of the tuberculosis burden in Asia demands national action". The Lancet. 388 (10057): 2217–2219. doi:10.1016/S0140-6736(16)31853-0. PMID 27751565. S2CID 4818306.
- Senaratne, Rajitha; Singh, Poonam Khetrapal (2016). "Against the odds, Sri Lanka eliminates malaria". The Lancet. 388 (10049): 1038–1039. doi:10.1016/S0140-6736(16)31572-0. PMID 27613520. S2CID 4828716.
- Sidibé, Michel; Singh, Poonam Khetrapal (2016). "Thailand eliminates mother-to-child transmission of HIV and syphilis". The Lancet. 387 (10037): 2488–2489. doi:10.1016/S0140-6736(16)30787-5. PMID 27291996. S2CID 4861083.
- Singh, Poonamkhetrapal (2012). "Progress in health-related millennium development goals in the WHO South-East Asia Region". Indian Journal of Public Health. 56 (4): 259–268. doi:10.4103/0019-557X.106412. PMID 23354135.
- Sinha, Dhirendran; Thakur, JS; Singh, Poonamkhetrapal (2011). "Trend of Tobacco Use and Exposure to Secondhand Smoke Among Students Aged 13-15 Years in India and Selected Countries of the South-East Asia Region". Indian Journal of Community Medicine. 36 (5): S78-80. doi:10.4103/0970-0218.94714. PMC 3354907. PMID 22628918.
- Singh, Poonam Khetrapal; Ofrin, Roderico; Ravindran, P.; Paturussi, Idrus; Yasir, Ibrahim; Aung, Than; Kahandailyanage, H.A.P.; Kunaratanapruk, Suprachai (2005). "Session 1.2: National Health Perspectives of the Tsunami Crisis". Prehospital and Disaster Medicine. 20 (6): 382–384. doi:10.1017/s1049023x00002922. PMID 16496617. S2CID 22654078.
