= Kosovo–NATO relations =

Kosovo's relations with NATO

- NATO: Kosovo

The Republic of Kosovo and the North Atlantic Treaty Organization (NATO) do not have official bilateral relations. In 1999, NATO conducted a bombing campaign against Yugoslav forces to halt their ethnic cleansing of Kosovo Albanians. Since then, NATO has maintained the Kosovo Force in the country.

Since its independence in 2008, the leadership of Kosovo has repeatedly expressed its desire to join NATO, while public opinion in Kosovo overwhelmingly favors NATO membership. However, four out of NATO's 32 member states do not recognize Kosovo as a sovereign state—Greece, Romania, Slovakia, and Spain—impeding accession.

Kosovo's application to join NATO's Partnership for Peace has been pending since 2012.

== Kosovo War ==
Longstanding tensions existed in Kosovo between the majority ethnic Albanians, who wanted to secede from Yugoslavia and join Albania, and the minority Serbs, who were discriminated against. Under the 1974 Yugoslav Constitution, Kosovo was a largely autonomous province, first as SAPK and then as APKM. In 1989, Yugoslav president Slobodan Milošević ended Kosovo's autonomy, exacerbating tensions and contributing to the outbreak of the Kosovo War in 1998.

During the war, Yugoslav forces engaged in the ethnic cleansing of Kosovo Albanians. The United Nations Security Council (UNSC) passed a series of resolutions condemning Yugoslavia's actions and imposing an arms embargo on it. By June 1998, NATO announced that it would take military action against Yugoslavia if there were no improvement in conditions. In October 1998, NATO authorized airstrikes on the Yugoslav government. Before the airstrikes began, Milošević agreed to withdraw his forces from Kosovo and the airstrikes were called off.

In 1999, the war resumed with even greater intensity against Kosovo Albanians. The United States Ambassador to Yugoslavia warned that unless Yugoslavia ceased attacking Albanians, air strikes were imminent. In March 1999, NATO began an aerial bombing campaign against the FR Yugoslavia government. After two months, Yugoslav forces began to withdraw from Kosovo, NATO and Yugoslavia reached an agreement, and NATO halted the bombing.

Following the passage of UNSC Resolution 1244, in June 1999, 20,000 troops constituting the Kosovo Force (KFOR), a NATO peacekeeping force, entered Kosovo to secure the return of Kosovo Albanian refugees to their homes and to prevent a power vacuum. As of 2024, KFOR remains in Kosovo, with a strength of 4,500 troops.

== Kosovo's NATO aspirations ==
Since Kosovo's declaration of independence from Serbia in 2008, the government of Kosovo has consistently supported joining NATO. Every president of Kosovo has called for the country's accession to NATO. In 2009, Kosovo's first president, Fatmir Sejdiu, stated that becoming a member of NATO, as well as the European Union, was a "major objective" for Kosovo. In July 2012, Kosovo applied to join NATO's Partnership for Peace (PfP) program. In 2014, Foreign Minister Enver Hoxhaj stated that the country's goal was to become a NATO member by 2022.

In 2015, the second president, Atifete Jahjaga, stated that Kosovo was determined to join NATO. In December 2018, Prime Minister Ramush Haradinaj stated that Kosovo would apply for NATO membership after the formation of the Kosovo Armed Forces. In 2019, the country's third president, Hashim Thaçi, stated that it was "vital" for Kosovo to join NATO and that the country needed to move more quickly toward joining the alliance.

Following Russia's invasion of Ukraine in 2022, Defense Minister Armend Mehaj called for Kosovo's accession into NATO to be accelerated. The following month, a supermajority of the country's parliament, the Assembly of the Republic, passed a resolution urging the government to start the process of joining NATO. That month, the fourth president, Vjosa Osmani, also called Kosovo's membership in NATO "imperative" and requested the assistance of the United States in joining. In 2024, Prime Minister Albin Kurti stated that Kosovo's "goal for NATO membership has been clearly communicated; we are daily working towards that goal."

In 2014, Kosovo became an observer member of NATO Parliamentary Assembly, an organization independent of NATO. In 2024, its status was upgraded to associate member.

One impediment to Kosovo's NATO membership is the dispute over its sovereignty. Kosovo is not a member of the United Nations, which is considered necessary for NATO membership. Kosovo is also not recognized as a sovereign state by four NATO member states—Greece, Romania, Slovakia, and Spain, which impedes its accession.

== Public opinion ==
Opinion polls on NATO membership of Kosovo
Dates conducted	Pollster	Sample size	Support	Opposed	Neutral or DK	Lead	Ref.
October 2014	KCSS (Note: Kosovar Center for Security Studies)	1,100	88.7%	8.7%	2.6%	80%	
November 2018	IRI	1,019	81%	—	18% (Note: Options other than NATO membership included more cooperation, more communication, no relationship, and refused to answer)	63%	
September 2021	IRI	1,200	89%	3%	8%	86%	
24 February 2022	Russian invasion of Ukraine						
February–March 2023	IRI	1,200	95%	2%	4%	93%	
May 2024	IRI	1,200	94%	3%	3%	91%	

== Positions of NATO members ==
In 2008, while meeting with the president and prime minister of Kosovo, the president of the United States, George W. Bush, stated that the United States supported Kosovo's membership in NATO.

== Positions of non-NATO members ==
In September 2024, the president of Serbia, Aleksandar Vučić, stated that Serbia will not agree to Kosovo joining NATO.

== Kosovo's foreign relations with NATO member states ==
- Albania
- Belgium
- Bulgaria
- Canada
- Croatia
- Czech Republic
- Denmark
- Estonia
- Finland
- France
- Germany
- Greece
- Hungary
- Iceland
- Italy
- Latvia
- Lithuania
- Luxembourg
- Montenegro
- Netherlands
- North Macedonia
- Norway
- Poland
- Portugal
- Romania
- Slovakia
- Slovenia
- Spain
- Sweden
- Turkey
- United Kingdom
- United States

== See also ==
- Foreign relations of Kosovo
- Foreign relations of NATO
- Enlargement of NATO
- NATO open door policy
- Membership of Kosovo in international organizations
- Accession of Kosovo to the EU
- International recognition of Kosovo
- Kosovo–Russia relations
- Kosovo–United States relations
- Serbia–NATO relations
