= Foreign relations of Kosovo =

Foreign relations of Kosovo are accomplished by efforts of the Ministry of Foreign Affairs of Kosovo. Kosovo operates 33 embassies abroad and is host to 22 embassies in Pristina. Kosovo has membership in several international organisations.

On 17 February 2008, members of the Assembly of Kosovo declared independence from Serbia. This move was controversial among the international community. International supervision over the direction of the assembly ended in September 2012, and Kosovo became responsible for its own governance. The Republic of Kosovo has been recognised by 110 UN member states, the Republic of China (Taiwan), the Cook Islands, and Niue.

The current Foreign Minister of Kosovo is Donika Gërvalla-Schwarz.

== Status of diplomatic relations ==
The Ministry of Foreign Affairs of the Republic of Kosovo has initiated the process of establishing diplomatic relations with all states that have recognised Republic of Kosovo, either by opening new missions or through accreditation of non-resident ambassadors to these countries.

== Diplomatic relations ==
List of countries which Kosovo maintains diplomatic list with by date:

#	Country	Date
1	United States (Details)	18 February 2008
2	France (Details)	18 February 2008
3	Albania (Details)	18 February 2008
4	Turkey (Details)	18 February 2008
5	United Kingdom (Details)	18 February 2008
6	Germany (Details)	21 February 2008
7	Austria (Details)	28 February 2008
8	Denmark (Details)	6 March 2008
9	Monaco	19 March 2008
10	Sweden (Details)	28 March 2008
11	Switzerland (Details)	28 March 2008
12	Belgium (Details)	10 April 2008
—	Nauru (suspended)	23 April 2008
13	Estonia (Details)	24 April 2008
14	Italy (Details)	15 May 2008
15	Slovenia (Details)	15 May 2008
16	Australia (Details)	21 May 2008
17	Bulgaria (Details)	27 May 2008
18	Latvia (Details)	11 June 2008
19	Czech Republic (Details)	16 June 2008
20	Hungary (Details)	27 June 2008
21	Netherlands (Details)	27 June 2008
22	Croatia (Details)	30 June 2008
23	Lithuania (Details)	1 September 2008
24	Norway (Details)	25 October 2008
25	Ireland (Details)	11 November 2008
26	Finland (Details)	2 February 2009
27	Japan (Details)	25 February 2009
28	Palau (Details)	25 March 2009
29	Canada (Details)	7 April 2009
30	Maldives (Details)	15 April 2009
31	Saudi Arabia (Details)	7 August 2009
32	North Macedonia (Details)	18 October 2009
33	New Zealand (Details)	9 November 2009
34	Montenegro (Details)	15 January 2010
35	United Arab Emirates (Details)	27 April 2010
36	Mauritania	14 September 2010
37	Honduras	2 December 2010
38	Qatar (Details)	7 January 2011
39	Oman (Details)	4 February 2011
40	Malaysia (Details)	23 May 2011
41	Luxembourg (Details)	16 June 2011
42	Saint Lucia	19 August 2011
43	Andorra	14 September 2011
44	Malta	22 September 2011
45	Portugal (Details)	14 November 2011
46	San Marino	3 May 2012
47	Iceland (Details)	15 May 2012
48	Liechtenstein	28 June 2012
49	Ghana (Details)	4 October 2012
50	Burkina Faso	6 December 2012
51	Dominica	12 December 2012
52	Kuwait	16 January 2013
53	Niger	25 January 2013
54	Pakistan (Details)	27 January 2013
55	Fiji	13 February 2013
56	Djibouti	19 May 2013
57	Jordan (Details)	5 June 2013
58	Yemen	11 June 2013
59	Guyana	13 June 2013
60	Afghanistan	17 June 2013
61	Panama	28 August 2013
62	Federated States of Micronesia	17 September 2013
63	Costa Rica	23 September 2013
64	Grenada	25 September 2013
65	Marshall Islands	28 October 2013
66	Thailand (Details)	22 November 2013
67	Senegal	14 February 2014
68	Gabon	9 March 2014
69	Bahrain	12 March 2014
70	Tanzania	2 April 2014
71	Libya (Details)	5 May 2014
72	Vanuatu	19 May 2014
—	Togo (suspended)	27 July 2014
73	El Salvador	10 October 2014
—	Solomon Islands (suspended)	27 April 2015
—	Cook Islands	18 May 2015
74	Comoros	28 May 2015
75	Somalia	28 May 2015
—	Niue	23 June 2015
76	Sierra Leone	24 November 2015
77	Saint Kitts and Nevis	4 March 2016
78	Belize	29 April 2016
79	Malawi	21 July 2016
80	Ivory Coast	24 August 2016
81	Gambia	22 September 2016
82	Singapore (Details)	1 December 2016
83	Tuvalu	2016
84	Brunei	20 February 2017
85	Samoa	10 March 2017
86	Bangladesh (Details)	16 February 2018
87	Barbados	9 March 2018
88	Chad	27 May 2018
89	Liberia	27 May 2018
90	Guinea-Bissau	10 June 2018
91	Antigua and Barbuda	24 July 2019
92	Colombia	1 October 2019
93	Guinea	20 February 2020
94	Israel (Details)	1 February 2021
95	Timor-Leste (Details)	9 March 2022
96	Tonga	17 April 2024
97	Bahamas (Details)	19 December 2025

=== Consular relations ===
#	Country	Date
1	Poland (Details)	8 November 2022

== Membership in international organisations ==
International Organisation	Political Entity Represented	Application date	Admission date	Status
During United Nations administration
Southeast European Cooperative Initiative (SECI)	UNMIK			Observer
South East Europe Transport Observatory (SEETO)	Kosovo*		11 June 2004	Member
Energy Community	Kosovo*		1 July 2006	Member
European Common Aviation Area (ECAA)	UNMIK		30 November 2006	Member
Central European Free Trade Agreement (CEFTA)	Kosovo* (Note: Under the United Nations Interim Administration Mission in Kosovo until October 2024.)	6 April 2006	26 July 2007	Member
After the Declaration of Independence
International Monetary Fund (IMF)	Republic of Kosovo	10 July 2008	29 June 2009	Member
World Bank (WB)	Republic of Kosovo	10 July 2008	29 June 2009	Member
Adriatic Charter	Kosovo*	29 March 2012	2012	Observer
European Bank for Reconstruction and Development (ERBD)	Republic of Kosovo	2010 or 2009	17 December 2012	Member
Regional Cooperation Council (RCC)	Kosovo*		23 February 2013	Member
Council of Europe Development Bank (CEB)	Republic of Kosovo		14 June 2013	Member
Venice Commission	Republic of Kosovo		13 June 2014	Member
Organisation internationale de la Francophonie (OIF)	Republic of Kosovo		29 November 2014	Observer
South-East European Cooperation Process (SEECP)	Kosovo*		23 May 2015	Member
Parliamentary Assembly of the Council of Europe (PACE)	Kosovo*		28 January 2016	Observer
Egmont Group of Financial Intelligence Units	Republic of Kosovo		1 February 2017	Member
World Customs Organization (WCO)	Republic of Kosovo		3 March 2017	Member
Permanent Court of Arbitration (PCA)	Republic of Kosovo	6 November 2015	5 January 2016	Member
European Qualifications Framework Advisory Group (EQF)	Republic of Kosovo		18 December 2015	Member
International Federation of Arts Councils and Culture Agencies (IFACCA)	Republic of Kosovo		21 February 2017	Member
Bureau of International Expositions (BIE)	Republic of Kosovo		18 March 2017	Member
Assemblée parlementaire de la francophonie (APF)	Republic of Kosovo		9 July 2018	Observer
Organisation internationale de la Francophonie (OIF)	Republic of Kosovo	9 October 2018	11 October 2018	Associate
European Political Community (EPC)	Kosovo*		6 October 2022	Member
International Commission on Missing Persons	Republic of Kosovo		19 July 2023	Member
NATO Parliamentary Assembly	Kosovo		24 March 2024	Associate
Board of Peace	Republic of Kosovo		22 January 2026	Member

=== Ongoing applications ===
Enver Hoxhaj, Kosovo's Minister of Foreign Affairs during 2011–14 and 2016–17, stated in November 2013 that the country was considering making applications for membership in three United Nations specialized agencies in the first half of 2013, and that an application for membership of the Council of Europe in 2014 was being prepared. Deputy Prime Minister Hashim Thaçi reiterated the state's desire to join in December 2014. Kosovo is also preparing a membership application for the World Trade Organization. Joining NATO's Partnership for Peace is a priority of the government. Hoxhaj said in 2014 that Kosovo's goal is to be a full UN member state by 2020 and a NATO member state by 2022. On 15 December 2022 Kosovo filed a formal application to become a member of the European Union.

International Organisation	Political Entity Represented	Application date
Council of Bureaux (CoBx)	Republic of Kosovo	2011
NATO Partnership for Peace (PfP)	Republic of Kosovo	July 2012
International Criminal Police Organization (INTERPOL)	Republic of Kosovo	April 2015
Council of Europe (CoE)	Republic of Kosovo	12 May 2022
European Union (EU)	Republic of Kosovo	15 December 2022

== Names used to represent Kosovo ==
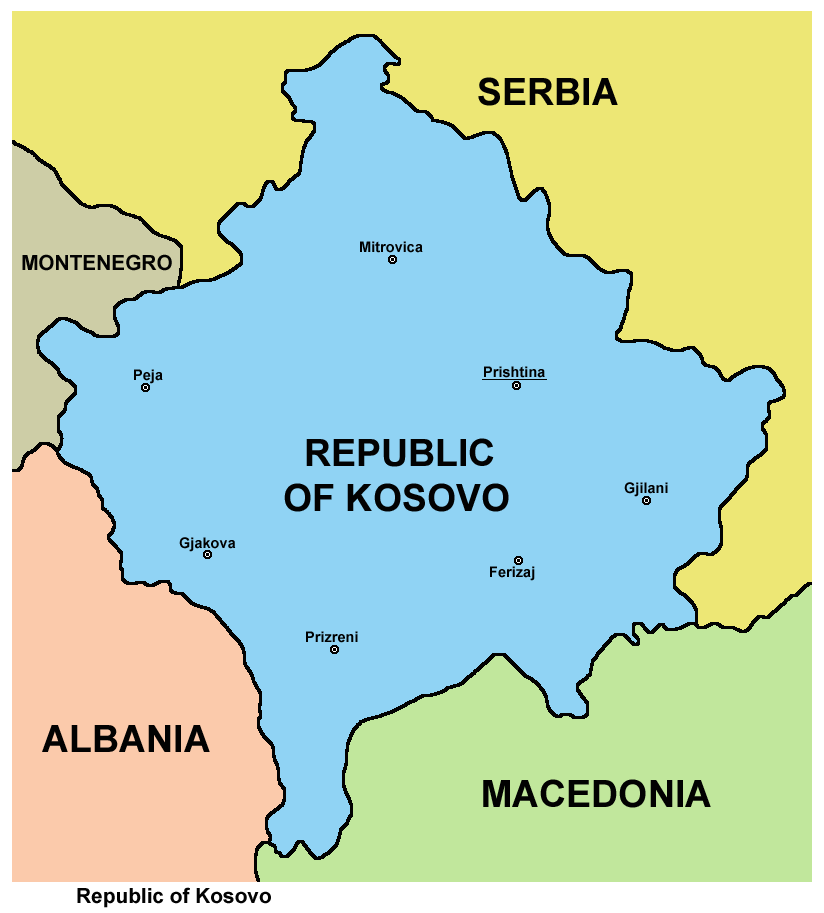
Map of the Republic of Kosovo

Kosovo is represented under the name:

- "Republic of Kosovo";
- "Kosovo*" (with an asterisk),

depending on the particular international forum. A list is set out above. The name "Republic of Kosovo" is self-explanatory and is the preferred nomenclature of the Pristina Government. The name "Kosovo*" with an asterisk is used in other fora. Where this name is used, the asterisk is linked to a footnote which reads:

This designation is without prejudice to positions on status and is in line with UNSCR 1244 and the ICJ opinion on Kosovo Declaration of Independence.

This "Kosovo*" designation was the outcome of an arrangement agreed to between Pristina and Belgrade in talks mediated by the European Union. This arrangement, which has been dubbed the "asterisk agreement" was agreed in an 11-point arrangement agreed on 24 February 2012.

"UNMIK" is an acronym for the United Nations Interim Administration Mission in Kosovo, which has joined several organisations on behalf of Kosovo.

== International treaties and conventions ==
International treaty or convention	Political Entity Represented	Signature	Ratification
Free Trade Agreement with Albania	UNMIK	7 July 2003	1 October 2003
Free Trade Agreement with North Macedonia	UNMIK		2 February 2006
Free Trade Agreement with Croatia	UNMIK	28 September 2006	1 November 2006
Free Trade Agreement with Bosnia and Herzegovina	UNMIK	19 October 2006	1 December 2006
EU Pan-EURO-MED RoO convention	Kosovo under UNSCR 1244		
Free Trade Agreement with Turkey	Kosovo	27 September 2013	1 September 2019
Stabilisation and Association Agreement (SAA) with the EU	Kosovo	22 October 2015	
UK/Kosovo: Partnership, Trade and Cooperation Agreement	Kosovo	20 December 2019	
EU Schengen Area non-visa agreement	Kosovo	26 April 2023	
13 agreements and declarations with Albania	Kosovo	6 July 2023	

== See also ==
- International recognition of Kosovo
- Membership of Kosovo in international organizations
- List of diplomatic missions of Kosovo
- Membership of Kosovo in international sports federations
- International Court of Justice advisory opinion on Kosovo's declaration of independence
- Kosovo–Serbia relations
- Bosnia and Herzegovina–Kosovo relations
- Accession of Kosovo to the European Union
- Kosovo–NATO relations
- Visa policy of Kosovo
- Foreign relations of Yugoslavia
