= Italy–Kosovo relations =

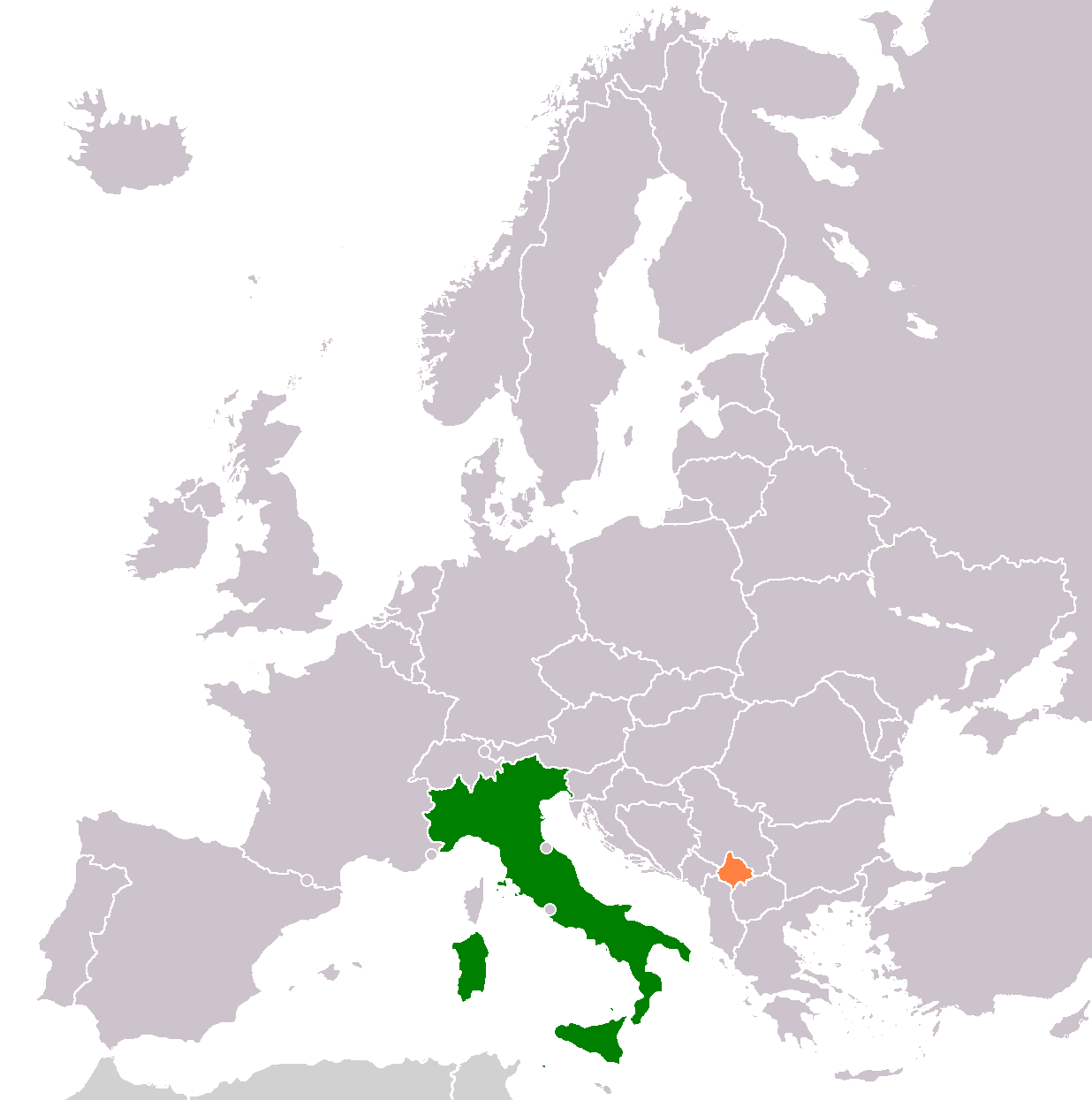
- Italy: Kosovo

Diplomatic mission
- Embassy of Italy, Pristina: Embassy of Kosovo, Rome

Envoy
- Ambassador Antonello De Riu: Ambassador Lendita Haxhitasim

Italy–Kosovo relations are foreign relations between the Italian Republic and the Republic of Kosovo. Kosovo declared its independence from Serbia on 17 February 2008 and Italy recognised it on 21 February 2008. Italy has an embassy in Pristina since 15 May 2008. Kosovo will open an embassy in Rome. The two countries enjoy friendly relations.

== Military ==
Italy participated in the 1999 NATO bombing of Yugoslavia, which resulted in a UN administration of Kosovo and then to eventual independence. Italy currently has 1,935 troops serving in Kosovo as peacekeepers in the NATO led Kosovo Force. Originally there was 5,000 Italian troops in KFOR. Carlo Cabigiosu was the 4th KFOR Commander from 16 October 2000 - 6 April 2001. Fabio Mini was the 7th KFOR Commander from 4 October 2002 - 3 October 2003. Giuseppe Valotto was the 10th KFOR Commander from 1 September 2005 - 1 September 2006. Also Giuseppe Emilio Gay is the current KFOR Commander since 29 August 2008.

Italy sent 600 Soldiers to serve as Peacekeepers in EULEX; an EU Police, Civilian and Law Mission in Kosovo.

== Economic relations ==
Italy is the second largest trading partner of Kosovo, after Germany and its trade relationship has grown steadily over the last few years. The most important sectors of exchange include energy, textiles, and information technology, with the facilitation of the use of the Euro as a common currency that simplifies the transaction of trade.

Italy has evinced a great interest in investment in Kosovo because of the very good business climate and a very young workforce. All this makes Kosovo an interesting target for the Italian company with interest in the emerging markets.

Apart from trade, Italy has been an active player in the EULEX for the strengthening of Kosovo's legal institutions and governance structures. This illustrates Italy's greater commitment toward ensuring a full implementation of rule of law and democratic principles within the region.

== Regional stability efforts ==
Italy is of primary importance in the stability perspective over the Western Balkans area, not only with its relations with Kosovo bilaterally. It has constantly favored the dialogue between Kosovo and Serbia because it perceived the need to settle the long-standing controversies for regional peace.

Italian diplomats have championed comprehensive agreements on sensitive issues such as minority rights, border disputes, and economic cooperation. Such a drive is in line with the Italian vision of an integrated Europe, where Western Balkan countries are potential EU members.

The Italian government uses military presence through NATO missions to combine diplomatic efforts for reconciliation and conflict prevention. This duality is a reflection of Italy's commitment to achieving enduring stability in the Balkans.

== Support for Kosovo ==
Italy became one of the first EU states to recognize Kosovo as a state in 2008, reaffirming Italy's commitment to self-determination and sovereignty. Such an approach is included within Italy's wider foreign policy toward the Balkans, namely stability and democratic governance.

Italy's position has sent its bilateral relations with Kosovo to the top, easing cooperation in security, economic development, and infrastructure projects. This support has raised several diplomatic challenges, especially in the relations with EU countries like Spain, Greece, and Cyprus, which, fearing for their territorial integrity, have opposed Kosovo's independence declaration.

In spite of these tensions, Italy is continuing to walk the thin line of balancing its relations with Kosovo and the EU non-recognizers, at the same time pressing for a common European policy position.

== Mediation role ==
Italy has been playing an active mediator role in disputes between Kosovo and Serbia. It calls for "full normalization" between Belgrade and Pristina to be able to overcome their outstanding issues and to advance along the road to EU membership.

Italian Foreign Minister Antonio Tajani has stressed that dialogue and compromise are the building blocks of peace in the Balkans. Italy's efforts have generally been well-received within the EU, though they occasionally create friction with member states more sympathetic to Serbia or cautious about Kosovo's statehood.

== Impact on EU cohesion ==
The Italian support for Kosovo illustrates broader challenges within the EU when it comes to foreign policy cohesion, divergent views among the Member States being divided over the question of recognizing Kosovo.

Despite these difficulties, Italy actively promotes a cohesive EU strategy that supports both Kosovo's development and Serbia's European aspirations. Encouraging cooperation and addressing internal EU concerns, Italy is seeking to maintain its leadership role in fostering regional stability and integration.

This structured analysis reflects the many-faceted relationship between Italy and Kosovo, which has to balance economic cooperation, diplomatic initiatives, and regional stability efforts. Italy's commitment to Kosovo underlines its broader vision for a peaceful and integrated Europe.

== See also ==
- Foreign relations of Italy
- Foreign relations of Kosovo
- Kosovo-NATO relations
- Accession of Kosovo to the EU
- Italy–Serbia relations
- Albania–Italy relations
- Italy–Taiwan relations
- Italy–Yugoslavia relations
