= Estonia–Kosovo relations =

Bilateral relations of Estonia and Kosovo

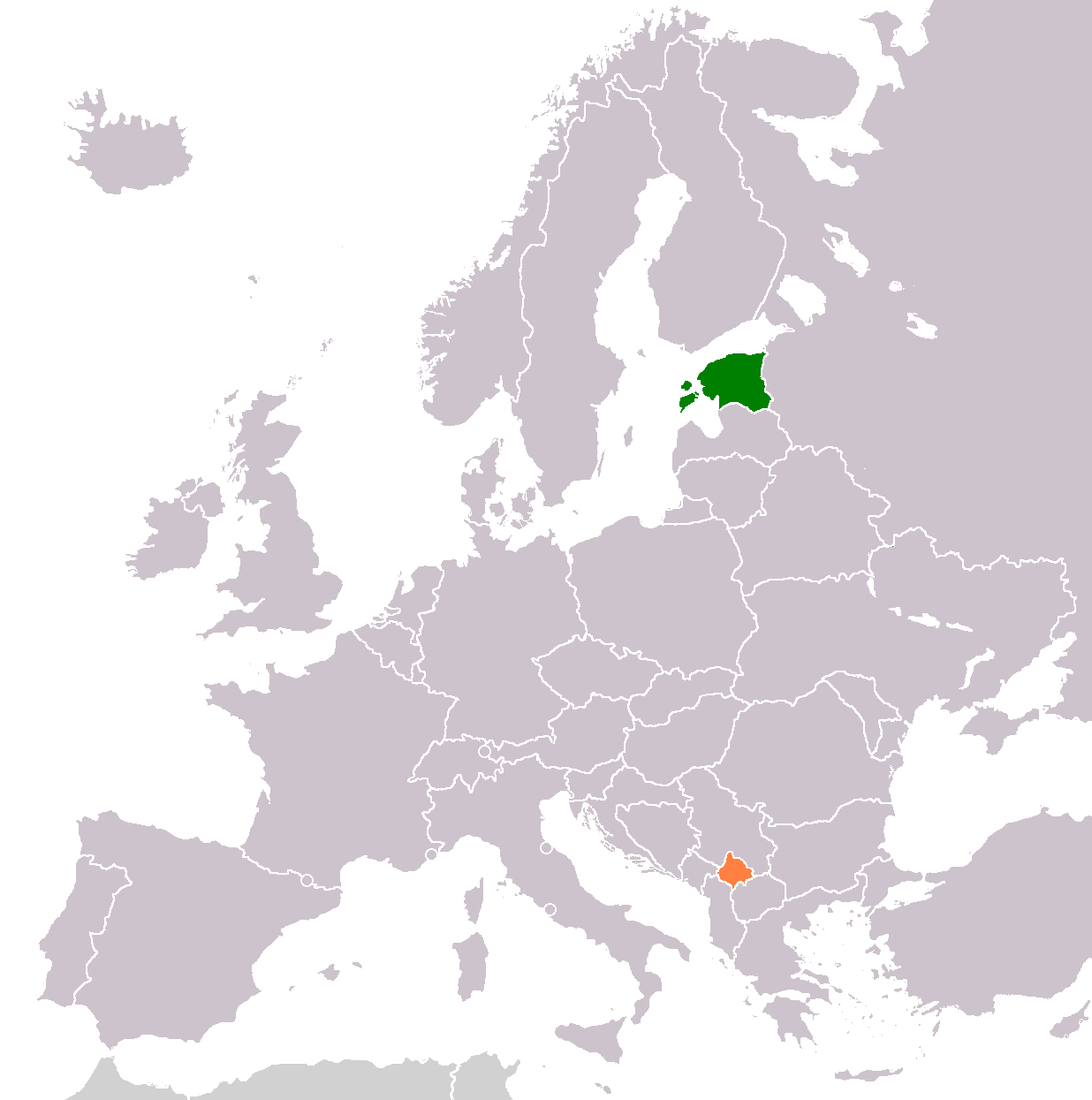
- Estonia: Kosovo

Estonia–Kosovo relations are foreign relations between Estonia and Kosovo. Kosovo unilaterally declared its independence from Serbia on 17 February 2008 and Estonia recognised it on 21 February 2008. The governments of the Republic of Estonia and the Republic of Kosovo established diplomatic relations in Tallinn on 24 April 2008.

== Military ==
Estonia currently has 30 troops serving in Kosovo as peacekeepers in the NATO led Kosovo Force.

== See also ==
- Foreign relations of Estonia
- Foreign relations of Kosovo
- Kosovo-NATO relations
- Accession of Kosovo to the EU
