= Canada–Kosovo relations =

- Canada: Kosovo

Diplomatic mission

Envoy
- Ambassador Adriatik Kryeziu: Ambassador Jessica Blitt

The relationship between Kosovo and Canada has been strong since Canada officially recognized Kosovo as an independent country on March 18, 2008, one month after Kosovo declared independence from Serbia. Since then, diplomatic ties have grown, with Canada supporting Kosovo in its development and integration into international organizations

Canada has played an important role in Kosovo’s post-war reconstruction and state-building efforts. It has provided financial assistance for democratic governance, economic development, and humanitarian aid. Many Kosovars hold Canada in high regard due to its contributions to peacekeeping efforts in the region, including participation in NATO-led KFOR (Kosovo Force).

== History ==
Canada

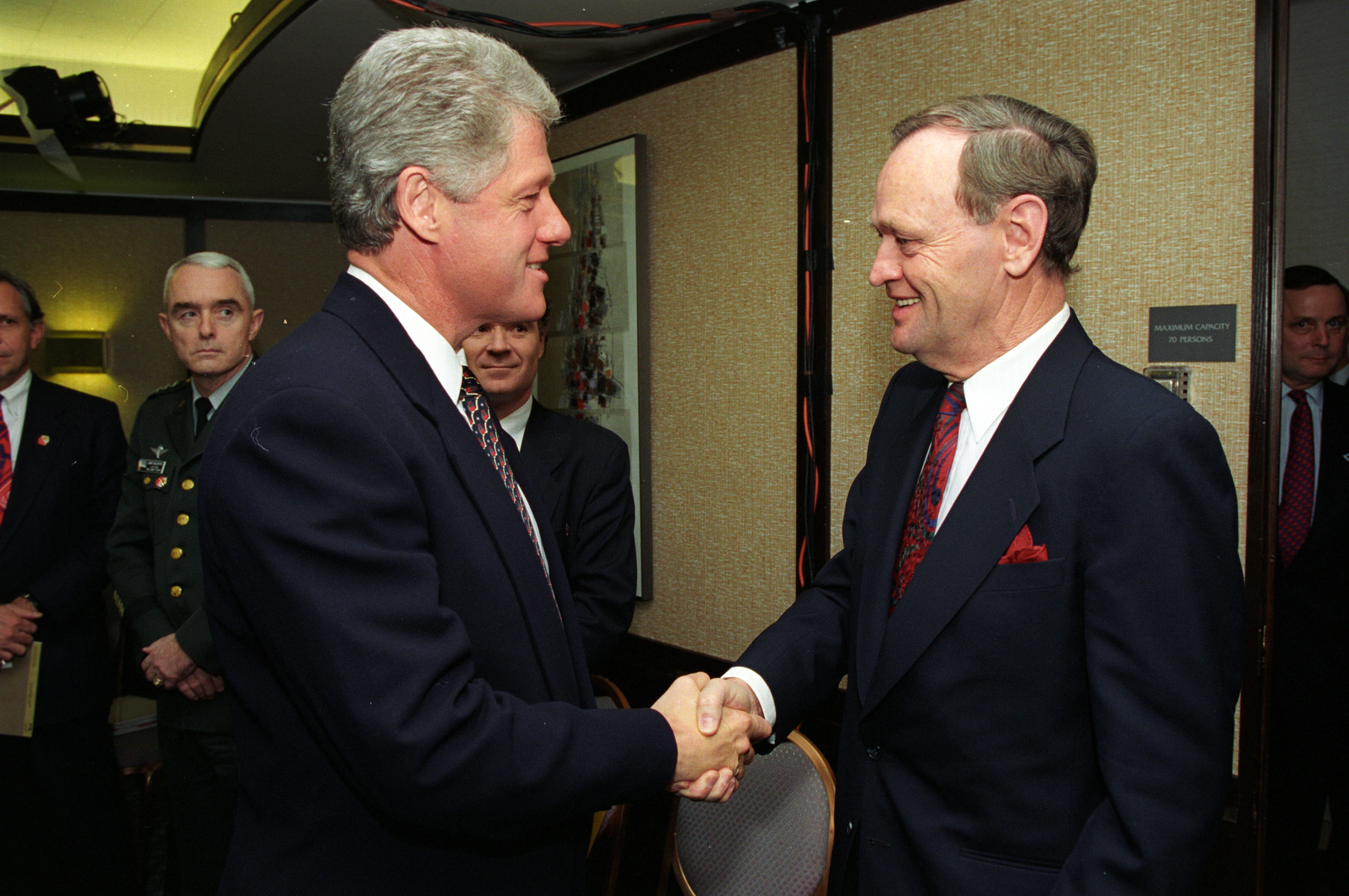
Former Prime Minister Jean Chrétien and Former President Bill Clinton worked together to help support Kosovo during and after the war in 1999.

Canada was one of the early supporters of Kosovo’s independence, officially recognizing the country on March 18, 2008. The Canadian government has consistently supported Kosovo’s sovereignty and its efforts for international recognition. Canada maintains diplomatic relations with Kosovo through its embassy in Zagreb, Croatia, and has an office in Prishtina.

The Canadian Armed Forces were involved in Kosovo as part of NATO’s intervention in 1999, which helped end the conflict and the humanitarian crisis in the region. Following the war, Canada contributed to stabilization efforts through KFOR and various international missions.

In the years following independence, Canada has provided development assistance to Kosovo, focusing on governance, human rights, and economic growth. Canada has also supported Kosovo’s integration into global institutions such as the United Nations and international financial organizations.

== Kosovo-Canada cooperation ==
The bilateral relationship between Kosovo and Canada includes economic, cultural, and educational cooperation. Canada has supported Kosovo in developing its democratic institutions, rule of law, and human rights frameworks. Canadian non-governmental organizations (NGOs) have also been active in Kosovo, working on projects related to gender equality, youth empowerment, and economic development.

Canada is home to a growing Kosovar diaspora, particularly in cities like Ottawa, Toronto, Calgary, B.C and Montreal. The Kosovar community in Canada plays a vital role in fostering people-to-people connections and strengthening bilateral ties. Many Kosovars have immigrated to Canada since the 1990s, contributing to Canadian society in various fields, including business, politics, and academia.

Canada has also provided scholarships and educational exchange opportunities for Kosovar students. Various Canadian universities have established partnerships with Kosovar institutions, offering programs and initiatives to enhance higher education in Kosovo.

== Political and diplomatic relations ==
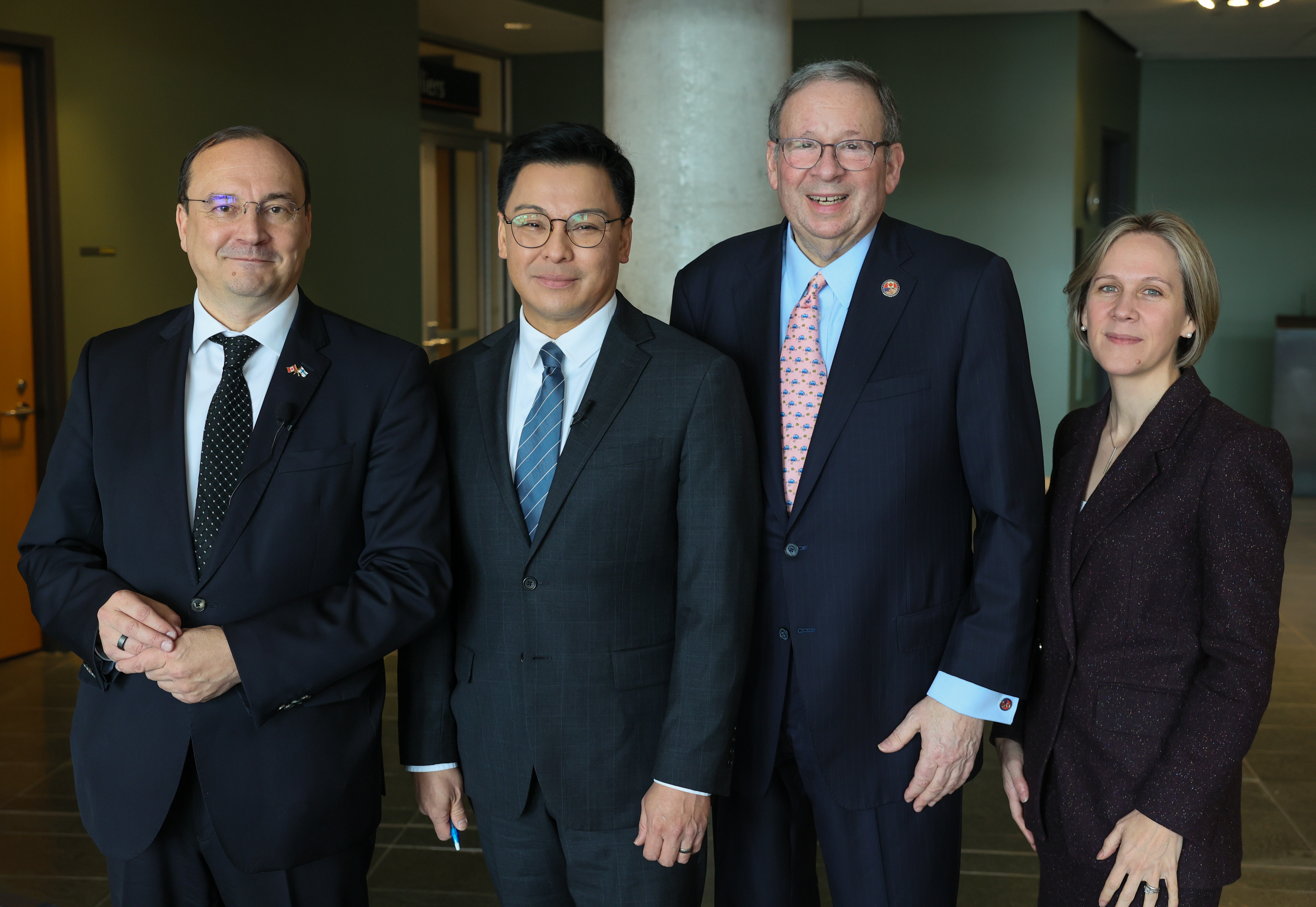

Kosovo and Canada share a commitment to democracy, human rights, and global security. Canada has supported Kosovo in its efforts to gain membership in international organizations, including the United Nations, and has consistently advocated for stability in the Western Balkans.

The Government of Canada continues to engage with Kosovo on various levels, supporting its Euro-Atlantic aspirations and working towards strengthening economic and trade relations. High-level diplomatic visits and meetings between officials from both countries have reinforced the partnership over the years.

Kosovar representatives frequently express gratitude towards Canada for its role in Kosovo’s development. Canada’s involvement in NATO-led operations and its continued diplomatic support have cemented its reputation as a key ally of Kosovo.

== Kosovo embassy and diplomatic missions ==
The Embassy of Kosovo in Canada is located in Ottawa, with consulates and honorary representatives in other Canadian cities. The current ambassador of Kosovo to Canada is Adriatik Kryeziu.

Canada does not have an embassy in Kosovo, but it maintains diplomatic relations through its embassy in Zagreb, Croatia, and its office in Pristina.

== See also ==
- Foreign relations of Canada
- Foreign relations of Kosovo
- Kosovo–NATO relations
- Canada-Yugoslavia Relations
- Canada–Serbia relations
