= Kosovo–Norway relations =

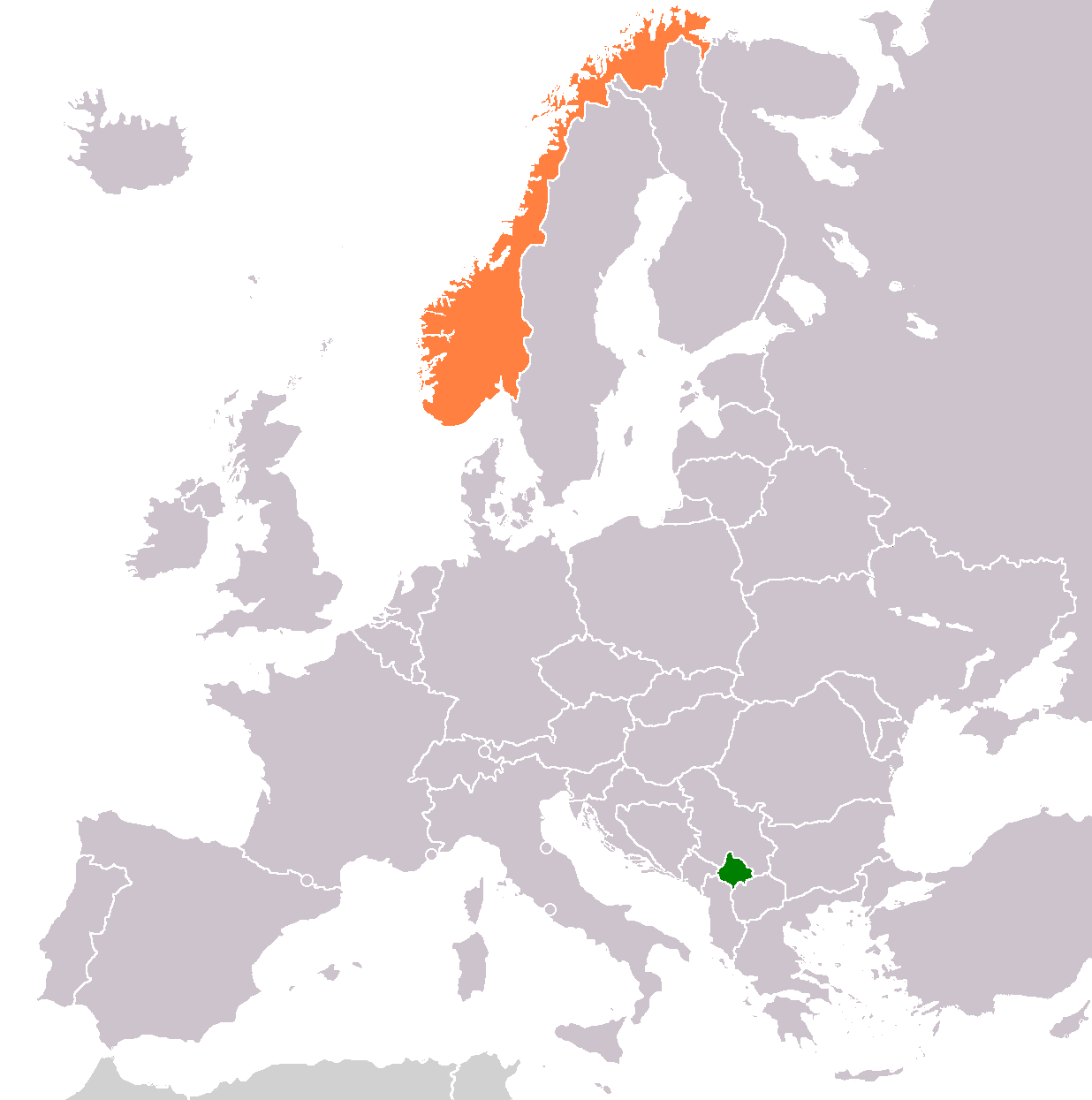
- Kosovo: Norway

Diplomatic mission
- Embassy of Kosovo, Oslo: Embassy of Norway, Pristina

Envoy
- Ambassador Nita Luci: Ambassador Jens Erik Grøndahl

Kosovo–Norway relations are foreign relations between the Republic of Kosovo and the Kingdom of Norway. Kosovo declared its independence from Serbia on 17 February 2008 and Norway recognised it on 28 March 2008. Norway has an embassy in Pristina, while Kosovo has hinted that it will include Norway in the second wave of embassy openings.

== Military ==
Norway currently has 8 soldiers serving in Kosovo as peacekeepers in the NATO-led Kosovo Force. Thorstein Skiaker was the 5th KFOR Commander from 6 April 2001 - 3 October 2001.

== See also ==
- Foreign relations of Kosovo
- Foreign relations of Norway
- Kosovo-NATO relations
- Norway–Serbia relations
- Norway–Yugoslavia relations
- Albanians in Norway
