= Belgium–Kosovo relations =

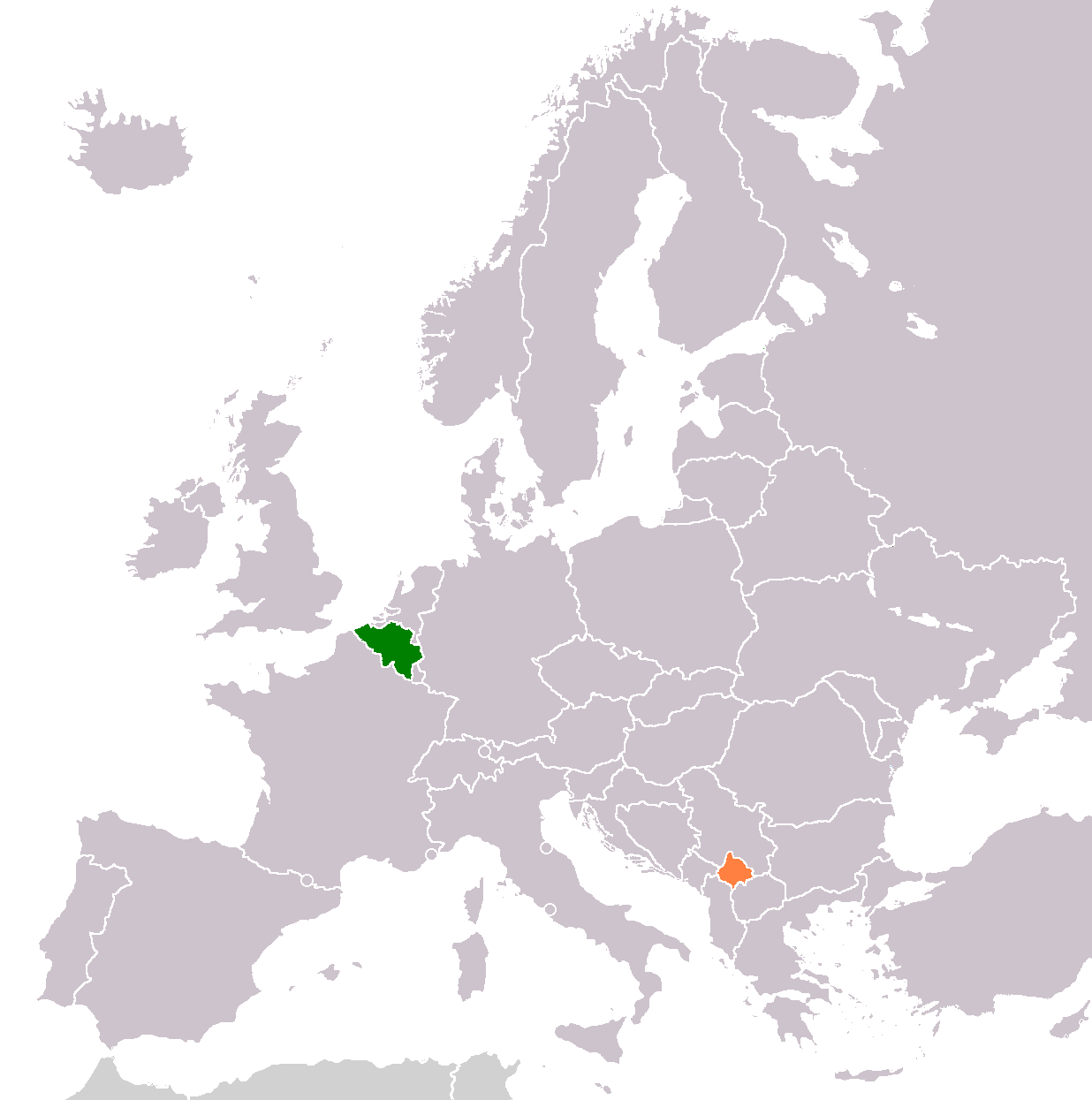
- Belgium: Kosovo

Diplomatic mission
- Liaison Office of Belgium, Pristina: Embassy of Kosovo, Brussels

Envoy
- Jean-Louis Servais: Ambassador Bernard Nikaj

Belgium–Kosovo relations refer to the bilateral relations of the Kingdom of Belgium and the Republic of Kosovo. Kosovo has an embassy in Brussels and Belgium has an embassy in Pristina.

Belgium was one of the first countries to recognise Kosovo's independence on 24 February 2008. As a European Union (EU) founder and member, Belgium supports Kosovo in its euro-integration path. Belgium played an important role in promoting peace in Kosovo, supporting NATO operations, and providing assistance to Kosovo Albanian refugees. The Albanian diaspora in Belgium raised awareness of the Kosovo issue and lobbied for independence. The two countries enjoy good relations, driven by their commitments to Western structures and alliances.

== Military Cooperation ==
Belgium has been a committed participant in the NATO-led Kosovo Force (KFOR) since its inception in June 1999. Following the Kosovo conflict, Belgium contributed approximately 1,100 soldiers to KFOR, playing a significant role in the mission's early peacekeeping efforts.

Over time, as the security situation in Kosovo improved, NATO adjusted KFOR's force posture, leading to a reduction in troop numbers. As of June 2024, KFOR comprises around 4,302 troops from 29 contributing nations. Belgium's involvement in KFOR reflects its dedication to collective security and regional stability in the Western Balkans. By contributing to KFOR, Belgium supports the mission's objectives of ensuring a safe and secure environment and freedom of movement for all communities in Kosovo.

In addition to its military contributions, Belgium has been involved in civil-military cooperation initiatives within Kosovo, aiming to support local communities and promote long-term stability. These efforts align with NATO's comprehensive approach to crisis management and peacebuilding in the region. Overall, Belgium's participation in KFOR and related initiatives highlights its commitment to international peacekeeping and the stabilization of Kosovo, contributing to broader efforts to ensure security and development in the Western Balkans.

== Economic relations ==
Belgium and Kosovo have developed modest economic ties since Kosovo's declaration of independence in 2008. According to the Belgian Foreign Trade Agency, the bilateral trade volume between the two countries remains limited, with Belgium exporting goods worth €2.3 million to Kosovo in 2023.

Kosovo's overall trade deficit was €4.7 billion in 2022, highlighting the country's reliance on imports. While specific data on Belgian investments in Kosovo is scarce, the two nations have signed agreements to promote economic cooperation, such as the 2010 Agreement on the Reciprocal Promotion and Protection of Investments between the Belgo-Luxembourg Economic Union and the Government of the Republic of Kosovo.

== Bilateral Agreements ==
Belgium and Kosovo have established several bilateral agreements to strengthen their relations:

- Social Security Agreement: This agreement regulates the applicability of social security legislations for employed and self-employed persons moving between the two countries.
- Investment Promotion and Protection Agreement: Signed in 2010 between the Belgo-Luxembourg Economic Union and Kosovo, this agreement aims to encourage and protect investments between the parties.

These agreements provide a framework for cooperation in social security and investment, facilitating smoother interactions between the two nations.

== Cultural and Educational Exchanges ==
Cultural and educational exchanges between Belgium and Kosovo have been facilitated through various programs, notably the European Union's Erasmus+ program, which enables Kosovan students to study in Belgian institutions. From 2015 to 2023, Kosovo's higher education institutions have benefited from 9,656 mobilities, encompassing both incoming and outgoing students and staff.

The Albanian diaspora in Belgium has played a significant role in promoting Kosovo's culture and raising awareness about its heritage. Diaspora entrepreneurs have developed political and cultural projects aimed at elevating Kosovo’s status abroad, including public diplomacy, the establishment of cultural centers, and educational exchanges.

== Challenges and Future Outlook ==
Despite positive relations, challenges persist, particularly regarding Kosovo's aspirations for European Union membership. Belgium supports Kosovo's EU integration; however, the non-recognition of Kosovo by five EU member states complicates this process. Belgium encourages Serbia and Kosovo to conclude a comprehensive and legally binding agreement to normalize their relations, which is crucial for regional stability and Kosovo's EU prospects.

Future cooperation is expected to focus on:

- Enhancing economic relations through increased trade and investment.
- Supporting Kosovo's EU integration efforts.
- Expanding cultural and educational exchanges to strengthen people-to-people connections.

== See also ==
- Foreign relations of Belgium
- Foreign relations of Kosovo
- Kosovo-NATO relations
- Accession of Kosovo to the EU
- Belgium–Serbia relations
- Belgium–Yugoslavia relations
