= Kosovo–Luxembourg relations =

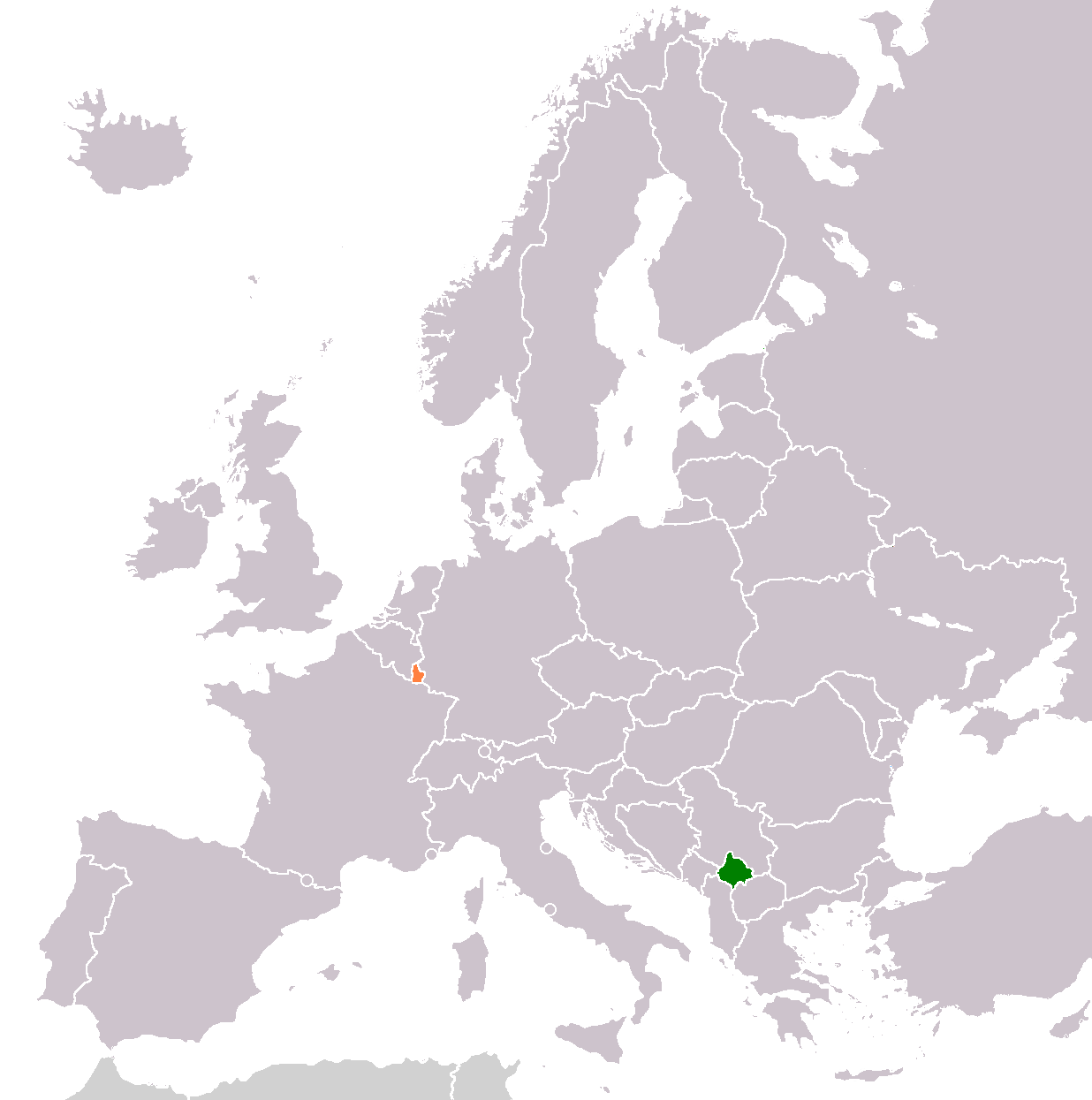

- Kosovo: Luxembourg

Diplomatic mission
- Embassy of Kosovo, Brussels: Embassy of the Luxembourg, Pristina

Envoy
- Ambassador Lirim Greiçevci: Ambassador Carin Lobbezoo

Kosovo–Luxembourg relations are foreign relations between Kosovo and the Luxembourg. Kosovo declared its independence on 17 February 2008 and the Luxembourg recognised it on 21 February 2008. Diplomatic relations were established on 16 June 2011

== High-level visits ==
=== High-level visits from Kosovo to Luxembourg ===
In June 2023, President Vjosa Osmani visited Luxembourg.

=== High-level visits from Luxembourg to Kosovo ===
In July 2023, Prime Minister Xavier Bettel visits Kosovan president Vjosa Osmani and Kosovan prime minister Albin Kurti in Pristina together with Dutch prime minister Mark Rutte in light of the increasing tensions between Serbia and Kosovo

== Resident diplomatic missions ==
- Kosovo is accredited to Luxembourg from its embassy in Brussels, Belgium.
- Luxembourg has an embassy in Pristina.

== See also ==
- Foreign relations of Kosovo
- Foreign relations of Luxembourg
- Kosovo-NATO relations
- Accession of Kosovo to the EU
- Luxembourg–Serbia relations
