= Kosovo–Poland relations =

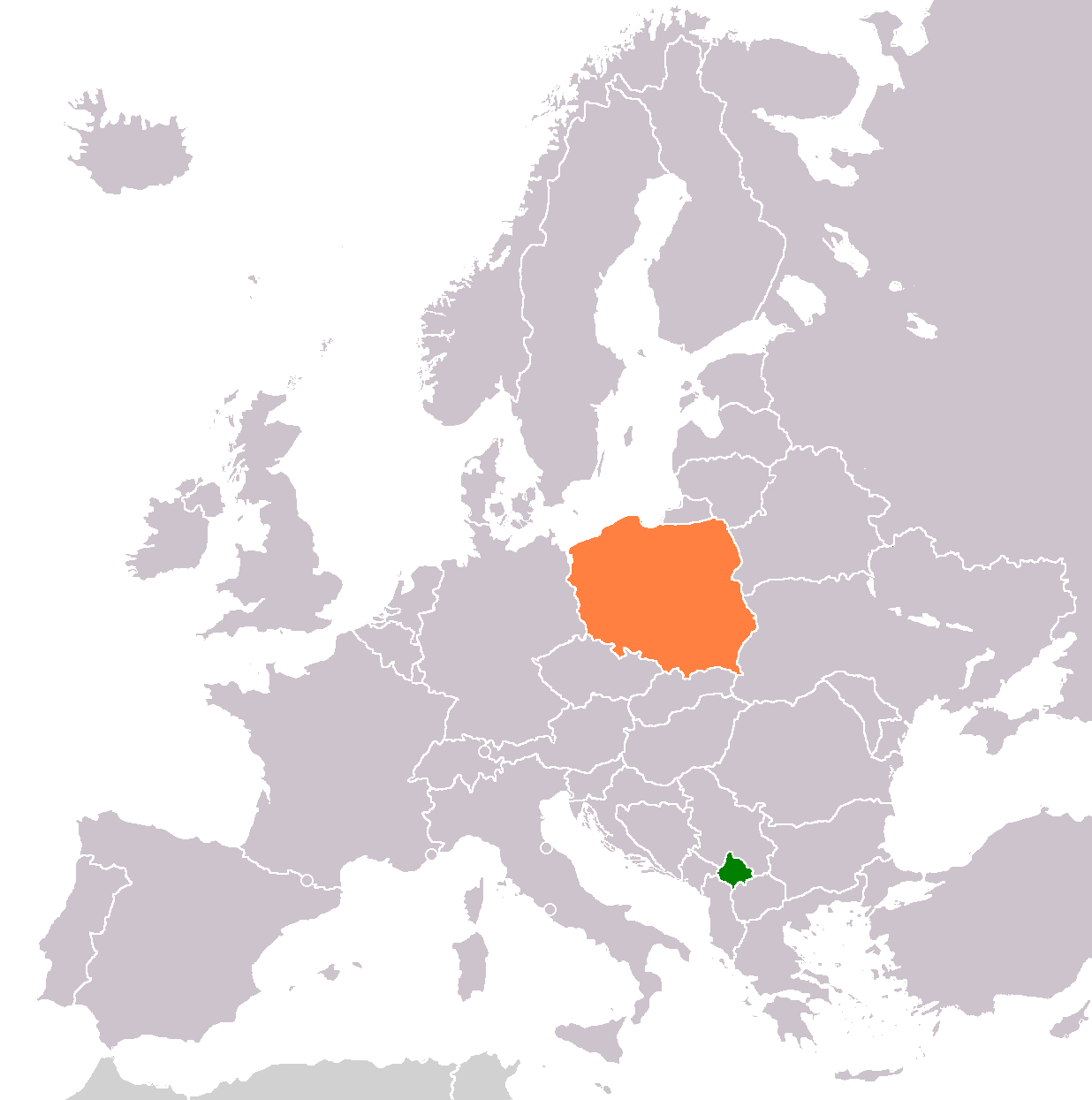
- Kosovo: Poland

Kosovo–Poland relations refer to the diplomatic, cultural, and economic interactions between the Republic of Kosovo and the Republic of Poland. These relations began in earnest following Kosovo's declaration of independence from Serbia on February 17, 2008. Poland was one of the first countries to recognize Kosovo's independence on February 26, 2008, becoming the first Slavic nation to do so. This recognition laid the groundwork for further bilateral collaboration and alignment within European frameworks. The relationship has since evolved to encompass peacekeeping, political support, and modest economic ties.

== Diplomatic relations ==
Poland has played a significant role in supporting Kosovo's statehood and its aspirations for integration into international organizations, including the European Union (EU) and NATO. Although Poland has not established an embassy in Pristina, diplomatic relations are maintained through its embassy in Skopje, North Macedonia. Meanwhile, Kosovo maintains its diplomatic presence in Poland through its Consulate General in Warsaw. Kosovo and Poland established consular-level diplomatic relations on 8 November 2022.

Since the recognition of Kosovo in 2008, Poland has advocated for the Western Balkans’ integration into the European Union. Polish diplomats emphasize the importance of stability in the region, viewing Kosovo as a key part of this strategy. Despite occasional political opposition within Poland from groups that support Serbia, Polish policy remains firmly aligned with Kosovo's sovereignty.

== Peacekeeping Efforts ==
Poland has been an active participant in the NATO-led Kosovo Force (KFOR) since its establishment in 1999. KFOR's mandate has been to ensure peace and security in Kosovo following the conflict in the late 1990s. At its peak, the Polish contingent included 800 troops, tasked with patrolling areas of ethnic tension and supporting local governance. Although the number of Polish troops has decreased over time, Poland continues to contribute personnel and resources to the mission.

The commitment to KFOR reflects Poland's broader interest in fostering stability in the Balkans. Polish officials have frequently highlighted the importance of long-term peacekeeping efforts to promote sustainable development and governance in Kosovo.

== Economic and Cultural Relations ==
Economic relations between Kosovo and Poland are relatively underdeveloped, with trade volumes remaining modest. Key areas for potential growth include agriculture, renewable energy, and technology. In recent years, both nations have expressed interest in enhancing economic cooperation. Polish companies have occasionally explored investment opportunities in Kosovo, although tangible outcomes have been limited so far.

Culturally, exchanges have played an essential role in fostering mutual understanding. Academic partnerships and student exchange programs have been initiated to strengthen ties between educational institutions in both countries. Kosovo's younger population has shown interest in studying in Poland, drawn by Poland's experience with EU integration and post-communist reforms. Cultural festivals and exhibitions also serve as platforms for showcasing shared values and traditions.

== Historical Context and Broader Implications ==
Poland's recognition of Kosovo in 2008 marked a significant moment in Balkan diplomacy, as Poland became the first Slavic nation to do so. This decision was influenced by Poland's historical experience with sovereignty struggles and its commitment to supporting democratic transitions. Poland views Kosovo's development as a parallel to its own journey from a communist state to a democratic member of the European Union.

Beyond bilateral relations, Kosovo is central to Poland's policy on the Western Balkans. By supporting Kosovo's statehood, Poland reinforces its stance on EU enlargement and regional stability. Polish leaders have consistently argued that integrating Balkan countries into the EU serves as a bulwark against external influences and secures Europe's southeastern flank.

== Kosovo in Poland's Foreign Policy ==
Poland's foreign policy toward Kosovo is shaped by its broader regional strategy, which emphasizes support for EU enlargement in the Western Balkans. This approach aligns with Poland's advocacy for solidarity among European nations. Polish officials have regularly called for greater commitment from the EU to integrate the Western Balkans, arguing that the region's stability directly impacts the EU's security and cohesion. Through its engagement with Kosovo, Poland continues to promote democratic values and European unity.

== See also ==
- Foreign relations of Kosovo
- Foreign relations of Poland
- Kosovo-NATO relations
- Accession of Kosovo to the EU
- Poland–Serbia relations
- Albania–Poland relations
- Poland–Yugoslavia relations
