= Ireland–Kosovo relations =

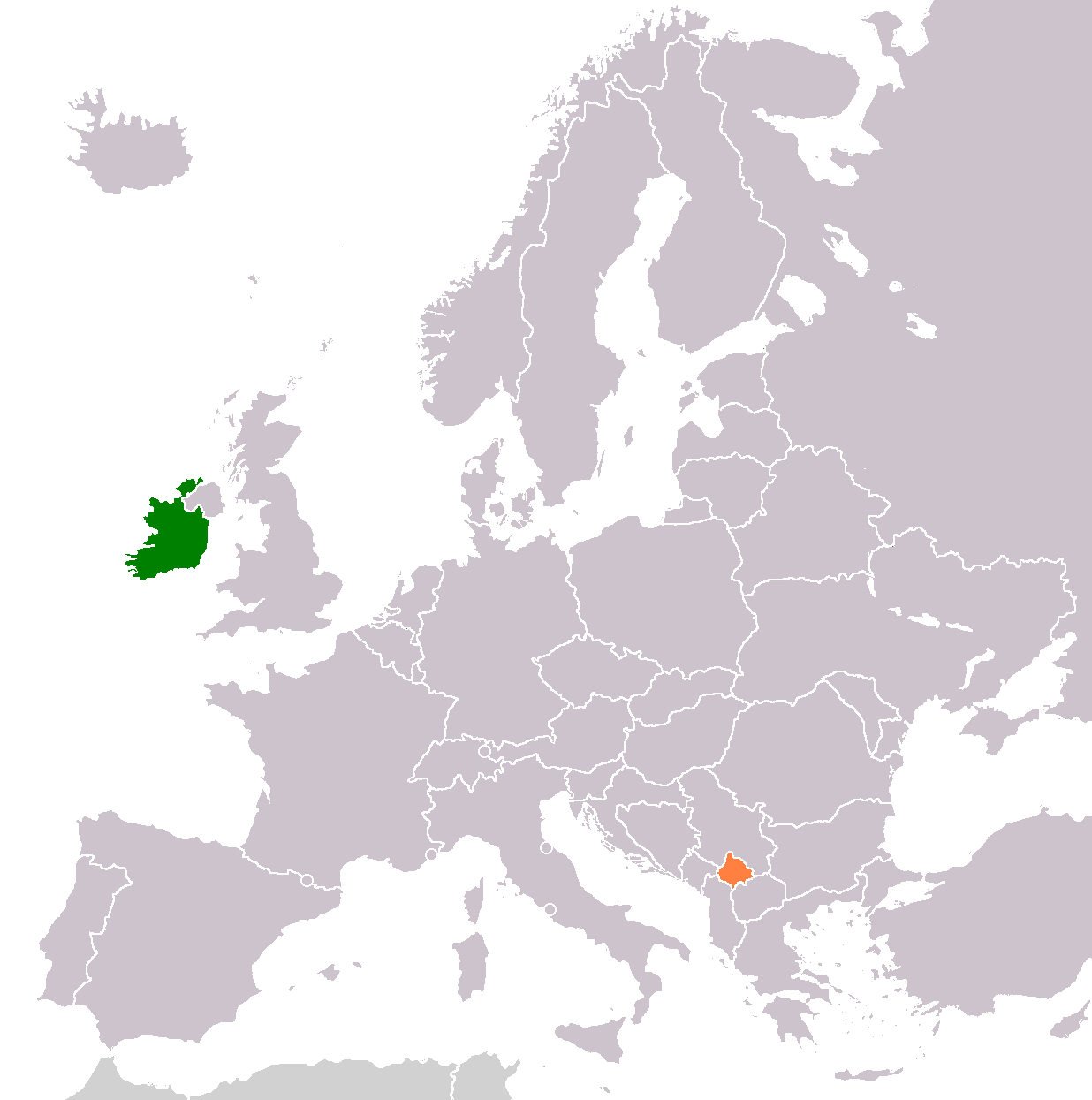

- Ireland: Kosovo

Ireland–Kosovo relations are the diplomatic, political, and economic foreign relations between Ireland and the Republic of Kosovo. Ireland was one of the first nations to formally acknowledge Kosovo's independence on February 29, 2008, after the country declared its independence from Serbia on February 17, 2008. This action reflects Ireland's long-standing commitment to supporting the self-determination and its role in fostering stability and peace in post-conflict areas, such as the Balkans. While highlighting Ireland's alignment with Ireland's broader international goals, this article examines the various dimensions of Irish-Kosovan relations while exploring Ireland's contribution to Kosovo's development.

== Relations ==
Ireland's diplomatic relations with Kosovo were officially formalized when Ireland's ambassador to Budapest, Hungary John Deady submitted his credentials to Pristina, Kosovo on 20 May 2011. Ireland does not maintain an official embassy in Kosovo. Instead, diplomatic affairs are handled through Ireland's embassy in Budapest. This strategy is typical for Ireland, which often handles relations with smaller or more recent states from regional embassies due to its limited diplomatic resources.

Ireland maintains strong diplomatic relations with Kosovo despite the absence of a resident, demonstrating its support for the country's ongoing development and integration into international organizations. This reflects Ireland's broader foreign policy goals of promoting human rights, peace, and stability throughout the world. Shared interests in promoting self-determination and peaceful conflict resolution has also shaped the Ireland's relationship with Kosovo.

== Refugees ==
Ireland participated in the international humanitarian response to the Kosovo War, by offering refuge to 1,000 Kosovars displaced by the violence. Although the Irish government's actions were praised domestically, this number was criticized by the United Nations Human Rights Commissioner and former President of Ireland Mary Robinson who pointed out that Ireland's response was limited compared to that of other European nations. She criticized the country for not doing enough to support war victims. This criticism highlights the ongoing discussion regarding Ireland's role in global humanitarian crises. Despite this, the acceptance of refugees from Kosovo is viewed as a positive step in its commitment to international human rights, providing shelter for those in dire need during a period of great upheaval.

== Peacekeeping ==
One of the most important aspects of Ireland's relation with Kosovo is its involvement in peacekeeping with the country. Ireland sent peacekeepers to serve in the NATO-led Kosovo Force (KFOR) after the World War ended. It was the first time Ireland has commanded such a force in a NATO-led United Nations mandated peace support operation.

In 2007, Irish Brigadier General Gerry Hegarty, took over command of one of the five multi-national task forces within KFOR. This marked a historic milestone for Ireland's military contributors to international peacekeeping, this was a historic turning point. The Irish role in KFOR exemplifies the nation's longstanding commitment to international peacekeeping missions and its willingness to support regional stability in the Balkans.

Because Kosovo was facing difficult political, economic, and security challenges, Ireland's peacekeeping with the country were crucial the during the early years. Irish troops were positioned throughout Kosovo, providing crucial security and support for the reconstruction process. A ceremony was held in Kosovo at noon on 15 April 2010 to mark the end of Ireland's major involvement in the KFOR peace mission.

== See also ==
- Foreign relations of the Republic of Ireland
- Foreign relations of Kosovo
- Accession of Kosovo to the EU
- Ireland–Yugoslavia relations
