= Czech Republic–Kosovo relations =

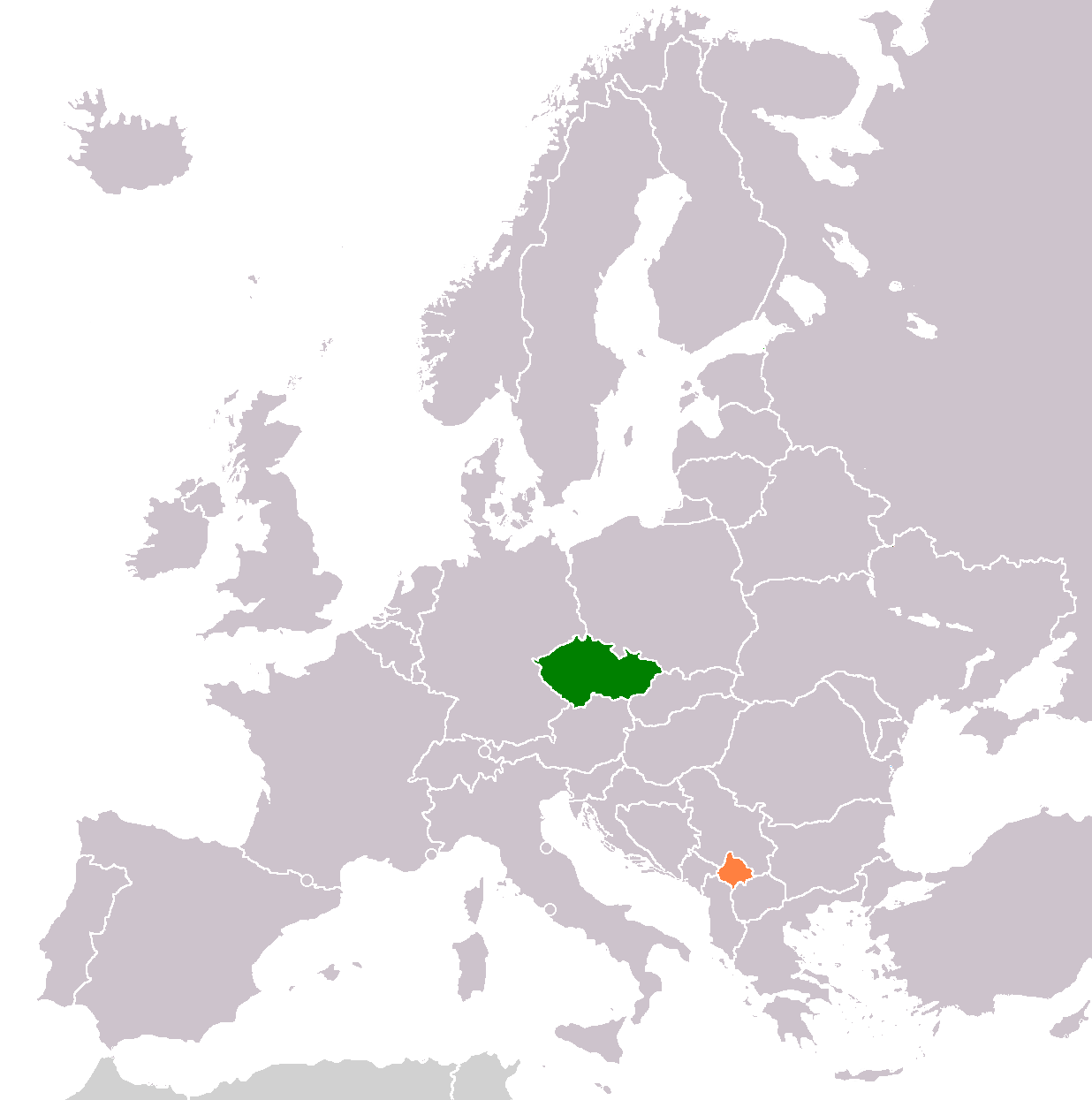
- Czech Republic: Kosovo

Diplomatic mission
- Embassy of Czech Republic, Pristina: Embassy of Kosovo, Prague

Envoy
- Ambassador Tomáš Szunyog: Ambassador Arbër Vllahiu

Czech Republic–Kosovo relations are foreign relations between the Czech Republic and the Republic of Kosovo. Kosovo declared its independence from Serbia on 17 February 2008 and Czech Republic recognized it on 21 May 2008. The Czech Republic opened an embassy in Pristina on 16 July 2008.

== Reaction to independence ==
When Kosovo declared independence from Serbia on 17 February 2008, the Czech government initially declared that they would not immediately recognise Kosovo as an independent state, instead the Czech Republic would wait for the European Union to come up with a common stance towards the declaration. It became clear shortly afterwards that the EU would have no common stand on recognition of Kosovo due to objections from members such as Spain, Romania, Greece, and Slovakia. Foreign Minister Karel Schwarzenberg then announced that the Czech Republic would take a wait and see approach; they would observe how many nations recognise Kosovo, and the way in which the Kosovo government behaves.

Prior to the 17 February declaration, the Czech Social Democratic Party and Communist Party of Bohemia and Moravia signaled their opposition to recognizing any unilateral declaration by Kosovo. Shortly after the declaration they stayed true to their pre-declaration words, with the two parties proclaiming a similarity between Kosovo's declaration and the 1938 Munich Agreement. President Václav Klaus also sympathised with the Serbian side, saying that the Czech Republic "must take into account the traditional friendly relations between the Czech and Serbian nations" and that the Serbian nation "has always sided with us in time of difficult historic trials".

Meanwhile, early supporters of recognising Kosovo as an independent state included Alexandr Vondra, the Minister of European Affairs. Vondra predicted that the Czech government would eventually recognise Kosovo, saying "It is sort of like dancing on eggshells, it is like handling a powder keg. In situations like this, I think it is better to be really careful. We will wait, we will evaluate the situation; there is no hurry. It will certainly not happen this week but let's be realists – we certainly won't wait for six months." Both Prime Minister Mirek Topolánek and Foreign Minister Karel Schwarzenberg eventually declared their support for recognizing Kosovo. Topolánek tried to get recognition through the cabinet of the Czech government just prior to the NATO summit in Bucharest. However, his attempt was unsuccessful because a significant part of the governing Civic Democratic Party opposed recognition.

According to an opinion poll published in early April 2008, 53% of a polled population believed that the independence declaration against Serbia's wishes would have negative consequences for stability in the Balkans, while 67% of them did not think that independence would help normalise relations between Serbs and Albanians in the slightest bit, but will rather exacerbate them further. Finally, 36% opposed Kosovo's unilateral independence declaration, 34% supported it, while the remaining 30% were undecided.

Encouraged by the results of the May 2008 parliamentary elections in Serbia in which the For a European Serbia coalition did much better than expected, previously skeptical ministers of the Czech government reconsidered their positions and began to support recognition of Kosovo. The "For a European Serbia" coalition is opposed to the unilateral declaration by the Kosovo government, however it also wants Serbia to join the EU. After three months of debate, on 21 May the Czech Republic recognised Kosovo as an independent nation because recognition will strengthen "the overall stability in the region" the government said.

After the recognition was announced by the Czech government, Serbia responded by recalling its ambassador from Prague. This was not an unusual move as, in an act of protest, Serbia had pulled all of their ambassadors from nations which recognized Kosovo. Before the Serbian ambassador left Prague, he met with President Václav Klaus. After the meeting Klaus said that he was especially alarmed by the words of Serbian Ambassador Vladimir Vereš that Serbs had not taken it personally when Kosovo was recognised by countries such as Finland and the Netherlands, but that they were hurt by the action of the Czech government. Klaus also said that he felt ashamed because of the Czech government's decision. As regards the opposition, their members still insisted that the recognition "is a shame and a violation of international law". Foreign Minister Karel Schwarzenberg, while admitting the decision is unpopular in some quarters, defended the government's decision by saying that independent Kosovo was a reality and Czech diplomacy would now be able to pursue active policies not only toward Kosovo, but also toward Serbia.

A month after recognising Kosovo as an independent state, this was still a hot political issue and the government was still advocating their decision from the opposers' critique. On 16 July 2008 the Czech government upgraded their liaison office in Prishtina to an embassy led by a chargé d'affaires. Belgrade also announced that its ambassadors will return to the EU countries that recognised Kosovo. The ambassador to the Czech Republic returned on 3 August 2008.

According to a poll published in July 2008, 30% of the polled population agreed with the government's decision to recognise independent Kosovo, 31% opposed it, and 39% were undecided. However, on March 31, 2009, the spokesperson of the Ministry of Foreign Affairs of the Czech Republic, Zuzana Opletalová, denied any such "de-recognition" moves and reiterated the official Czech position that the recognition of Kosovo is a finished and irreversible act.

=== 2013 ===
The newly elected Czech President Miloš Zeman has an even more critical approach to Kosovo's independence than his predecessor; he announced maintaining the position that no Czech embassy shall be opened in Prishtina, but that the Czech liaison officer shall be withdrawn. He stands for the Czech revocation of recognition of independence and has called Kosovo "a terrorist regime financed by narco mafias". In the same interview, he also asserted he would leave all Balkan nations out of the EU except for Croatia and Serbia.

=== 2018 ===
In May 2018, the Czech government announced its support of EU enlargement to all six Balkan countries at the forthcoming EU summit, on the initiative of Prime Minister Andrej Babis.

=== 2019 ===
On a state visit to Serbia in September 2019, Czech President Miloš Zeman stated he would like for Czech Republic to revoke its recognition of Kosovo as an independent state, and that he would discuss the issue with Czech lawmakers.

== Military ==
The Czech Republic currently has 411 troops serving in Kosovo as peacekeepers in the NATO led Kosovo Force.

== See also ==
- Foreign relations of Czech Republic
- Foreign relations of Kosovo
- Kosovo-NATO relations
- Accession of Kosovo to the EU
- Czechoslovakia–Yugoslavia relations
