= Kosovo–Latvia relations =

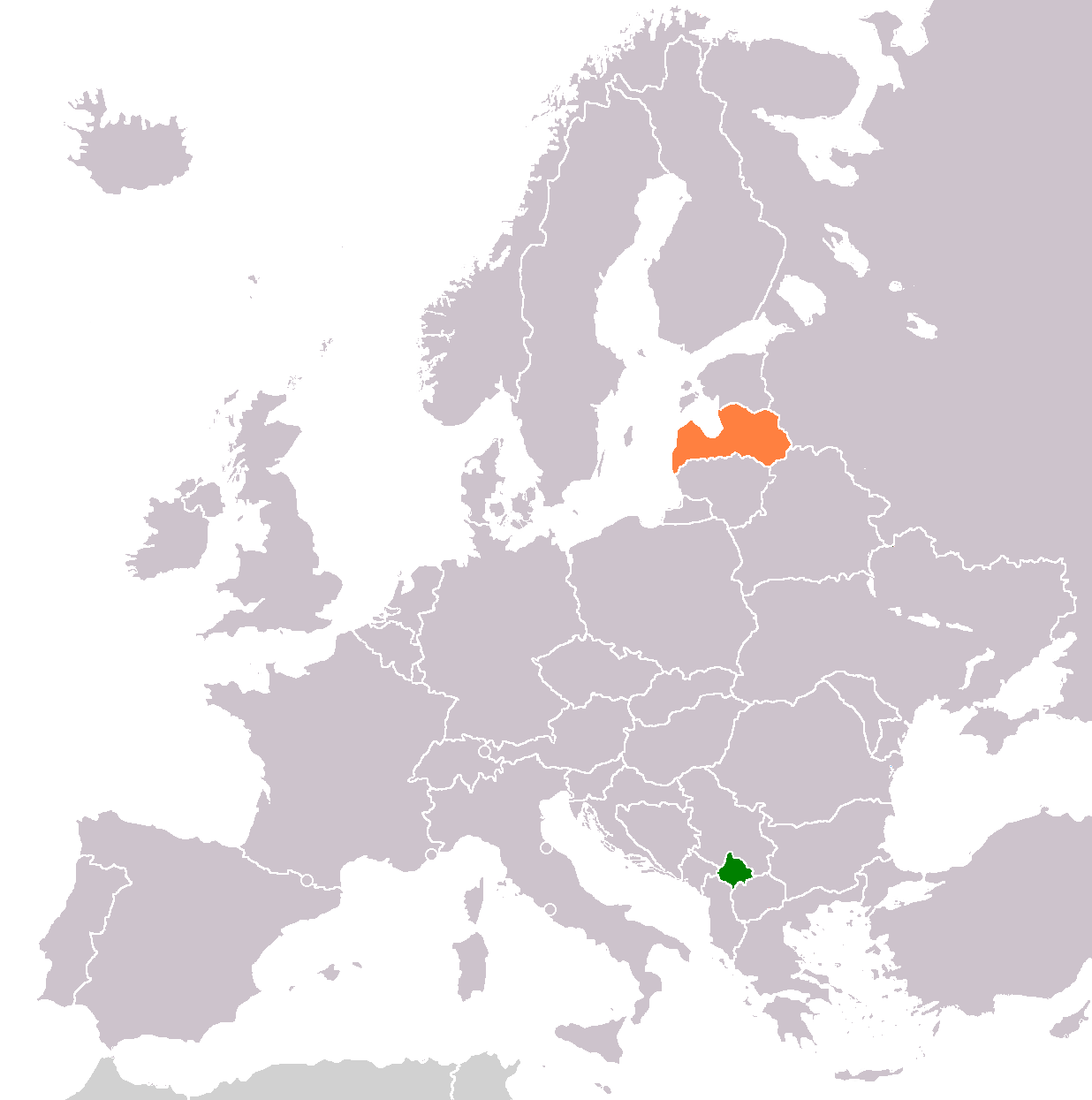

- Kosovo: Latvia

Kosovo–Latvia relations are foreign relations between the Republic of Kosovo and the Republic of Latvia. Kosovo declared its independence from Serbia on 17 February 2008 and Latvia recognised it on 20 February 2008. Latvian and Kosovan governments established diplomatic relations on 11 June 2008. However, Latvia's involvement in Kosovo dates back to 2000 when it first sent peacekeeping troops.

== History ==
In 2000, Latvian President Vaira Vike-Freiberga suggested that NATO's willingness to intervene in Kosovo means that the Western alliance will be prepared to come to the aid of Latvia and other East European countries should Moscow threaten them at some point in the future. She stated: "Kosovo is not a member of the NATO alliance and yet the alliance was able to take action when it felt that, according to the principles on which it is founded, action and intervention was necessary. I would expect it to do no less anywhere else in Europe."

In November 2005, Kosovo President Ibrahim Rugova met Latvian Foreign Minister, Artis Pabriks.

Following the formal recognition of Kosovo in February 2008, Latvian Foreign Minister Maris Riekstins said: "Latvia is ready to share its experience in order to facilitate Kosovo's development towards its Europeisation". The Minister also stressed the significance of Latvia's involvement in both the European Union Rule of Law Mission in Kosovo (EULEX Kosovo), the key objective of which is to assist Kosovar public administration, courts, and law enforcement bodies, and in the International Steering Group for Kosovo.

In July 2008, Foreign Minister Riekstins visited Kosovo and met with President Fatmir Sejdiu, Prime Minister Hashim Thaçi and Foreign Minister Skender Hyseni. President Seijdiu said he was appreciative of the work of the representatives of the Latvian Contingent within the NATO-led peacekeeping forces (KFOR), and also the participation of Latvian experts in the EU Rule of Law Mission (EULEX) in Kosovo.

During this visit, Minister Riekstins said: "One can draw certain parallels between the history of Latvia and Kosovo, because Latvia too in the early 1990s had to start from the very beginning in the formation of state institutions, this is precisely why we are prepared to share our experience with the government of Kosovo, offering both our political and practical support."

== Peacekeeping ==
In July 1999, the Latvian Parliament approved by a majority of 71–6 to send peacekeepers to Kosovo. In 2000, the first Latvian troops were sent to Kosovo for peacekeeping. In 2005, Latvia committed 105 troops to the peacekeeping effort in Kosovo. As of 2009, Latvia has 17 troops serving in Kosovo as peacekeepers in the NATO led Kosovo Force.

== See also ==
- Foreign relations of Latvia
- Foreign relations of Kosovo
- Kosovo-NATO relations
- Accession of Kosovo to the EU
