= Kosovo–Slovenia relations =

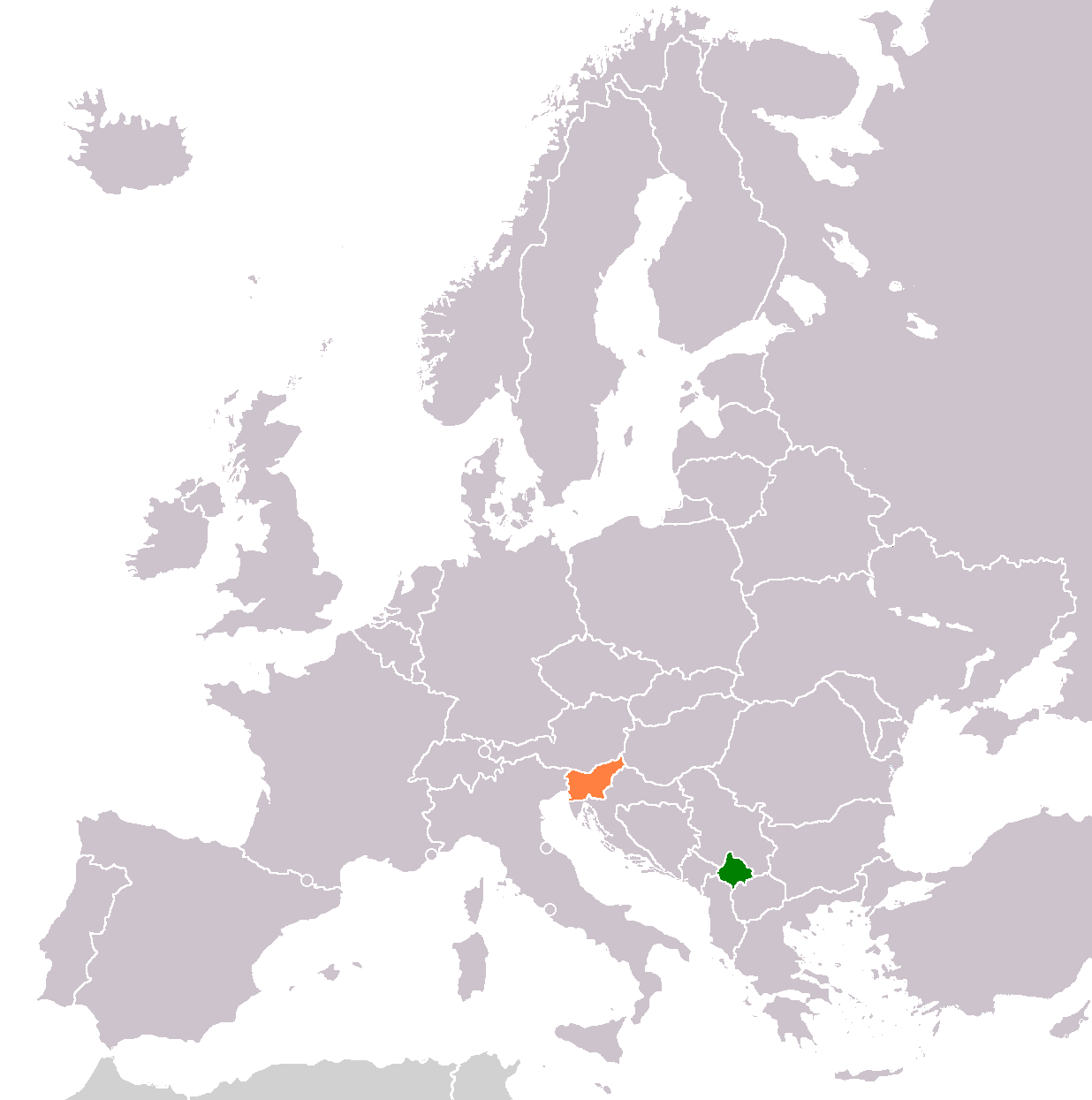

- Kosovo: Slovenia

Diplomatic mission
- Embassy of Kosovo, Ljubljana: Embassy of Slovenia, Pristina

Envoy
- Ambassador Minca Benedejčič

Kosovo–Slovenia relations are foreign relations between the Republic of Kosovo and the Republic of Slovenia. Kosovo declared its independence from Serbia on 17 February 2008 and Slovenia recognised it on 5 March 2008. The diplomatic relations were established on 8 April 2008. Slovenia has had an embassy in Pristina since 15 May 2008. The first ambassador of Kosovo in Slovenia has been Anton Berisha, who handed his credentials to the President of Slovenia in January 2010.

== Military ==
Slovenia currently has 383 troops serving in Kosovo as peacekeepers in the NATO led Kosovo Force.

== See also ==
- Foreign relations of Kosovo
- Foreign relations of Slovenia
- Kosovo-NATO relations
- Accession of Kosovo to the EU
- Serbia–Slovenia relations
