= Kosovo–Lithuania relations =

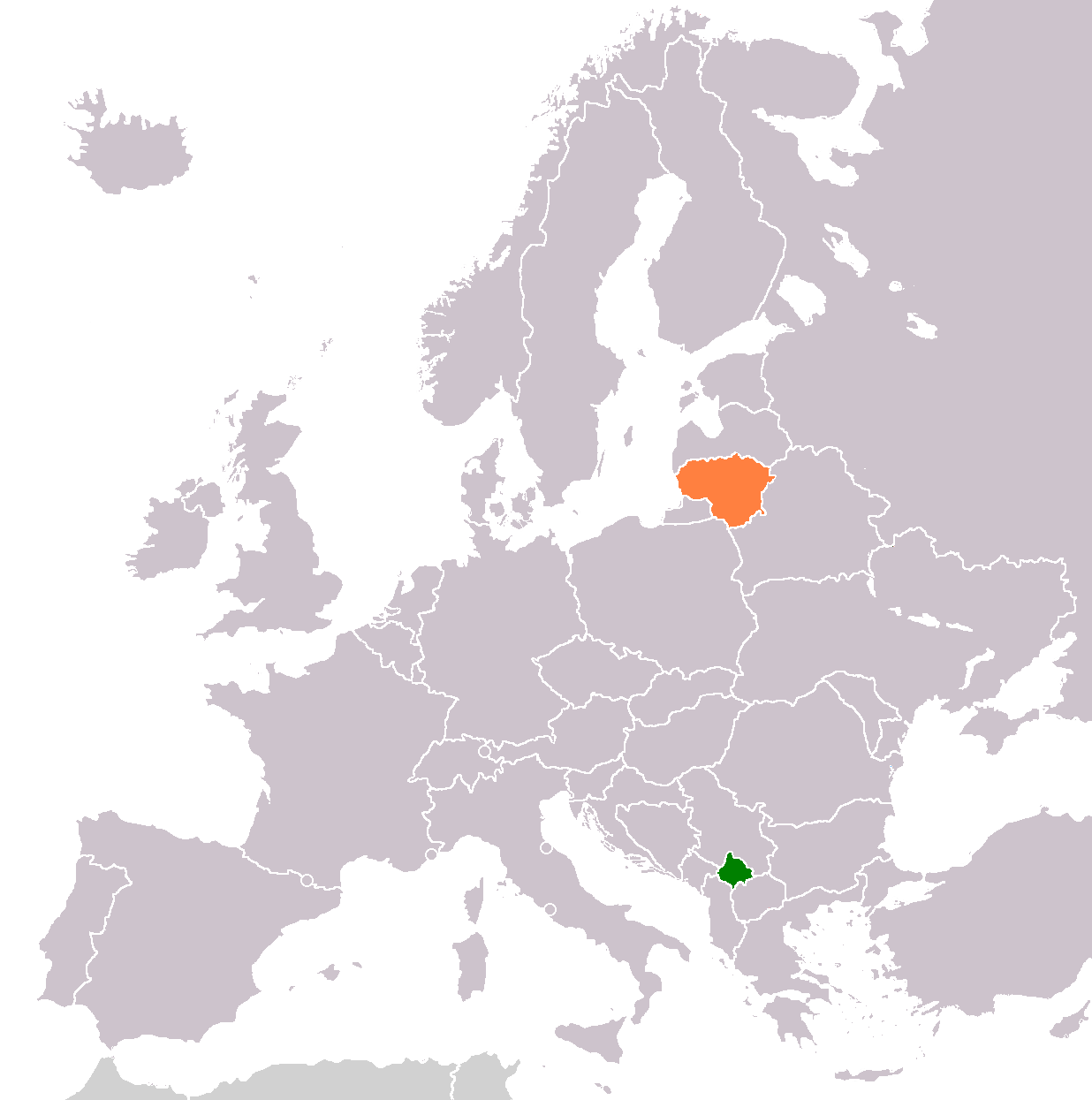

- Kosovo: Lithuania

Kosovo–Lithuania relations are the bilateral relations between the Republic of Kosovo and the Republic of Lithuania. Kosovo declared its independence from Serbia on 17 February 2008 and Lithuania recognized it on 6 May 2008. Diplomatic relations commenced on 16 July 2008.

== Military ==
As of 2009, Lithuania had 36 troops serving in Kosovo as peacekeepers in the NATO-led Kosovo Force. On November 30, 2009, Lithuania and Kosovo signed a military agreement to strengthen Kosovo's relationship with NATO and to bolster its independence.

On 30 November 2009, Kosovo and Lithuania strengthened military ties when their defence ministers met during a three-day visit to Lithuania. Lithuania is represented in Kosovo through the Embassy of the Republic of Lithuania to the Republic of Croatia in Zagreb, Croatia.

== See also ==
- Foreign relations of Kosovo
- Foreign relations of Lithuania
- Kosovo-NATO relations
- Accession of Kosovo to the EU
