= Denmark–Kosovo relations =

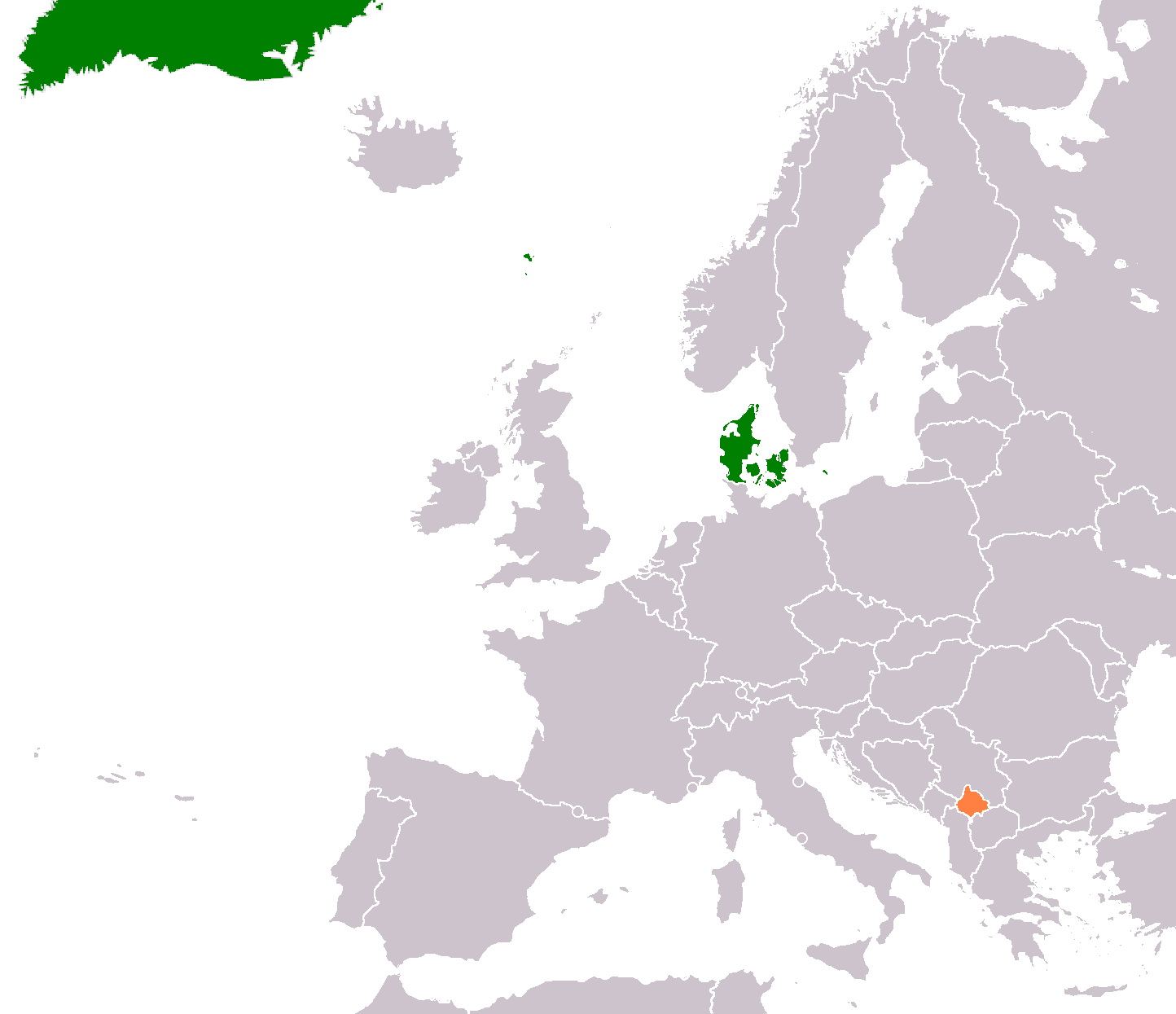
- Denmark: Kosovo

Denmark–Kosovo relations are foreign relations between Denmark and Kosovo. Kosovo declared its independence from Serbia on 17 February 2008 and Denmark recognized it on 21 February 2008. Denmark has been a strong supporter of Kosovo's state building and European integration efforts since its independence. The Ambassador of Denmark to Kosovo, subordinate to the embassy in Vienna, Austria, has been stationed in Kosovo since 6 March 2008.

Denmark has provided important political and financial support to Kosovo, especially in areas such as governance, rule of law, and human rights. Denmark's recognition of Kosovo was a part of its broader commitment to the region's stability and European integration. In addition to diplomatic recognition, Denmark has been an active participant in Kosovo's development through different aid programs, including support for democratic institutions, civil society, and economic development.

== Military ==
Denmark has been an active contributor to the NATO-led Kosovo Force (KFOR) since its establishment in 1999. Initially, Denmark deployed up to 308 soldiers to support peacekeeping and stabilization efforts in Kosovo. By November 2010, Denmark maintained a 152-member unit within KFOR, with personnel stationed across various sectors of Kosovo to assist in maintaining security and supporting the rebuilding process.

Danish troops have been involved in many operations, including enduring the safety of local populations, supporting demilitarization of former combatants, and facilitating the return of refugees. Their presence has been crucial in helping to foster stability and supporting the development of Kosovo's institutions. With time, Denmark has adjusted its military presence in Kosovo in line with NATO's evolving strategy. Even though the number of Danish troops has decreased, they still play an important role in maintaining stability and supporting Kosovo's security forces.

== Prison lease ==
In 2021, Kosovo and Denmark signed an agreement for Kosovo to lease 300 prison cells to Denmark, in exchange for approximately 200 million euros over 10 years. The agreement, which Kosovo's parliament ratified in 2024, allows Denmark to house foreign inmates convicted in Denmark, particularly migrants, in Kosovo for the remainder of their sentences. While Kosovo stands to benefit financially from the deal, some argue that it sets a dangerous precedent, with concerns over human rights violations and potential overcrowding in Kosovo’s prison system. Rights groups have raised alarms about the conditions inmates might face, citing allegations of abuse in Kosovo's prisons. Nonetheless, proponents, including Kosovo’s ruling Vetevendosje party, argue that the deal could improve local prison standards, as the facility will be renovated to Danish specifications, and Danish personnel will assist in managing the prison.

== See also ==
- Foreign relations of Denmark
- Foreign relations of Kosovo
- Kosovo-NATO relations
- Accession of Kosovo to the EU
- Denmark–Serbia relations
