= Iceland–Kosovo relations =

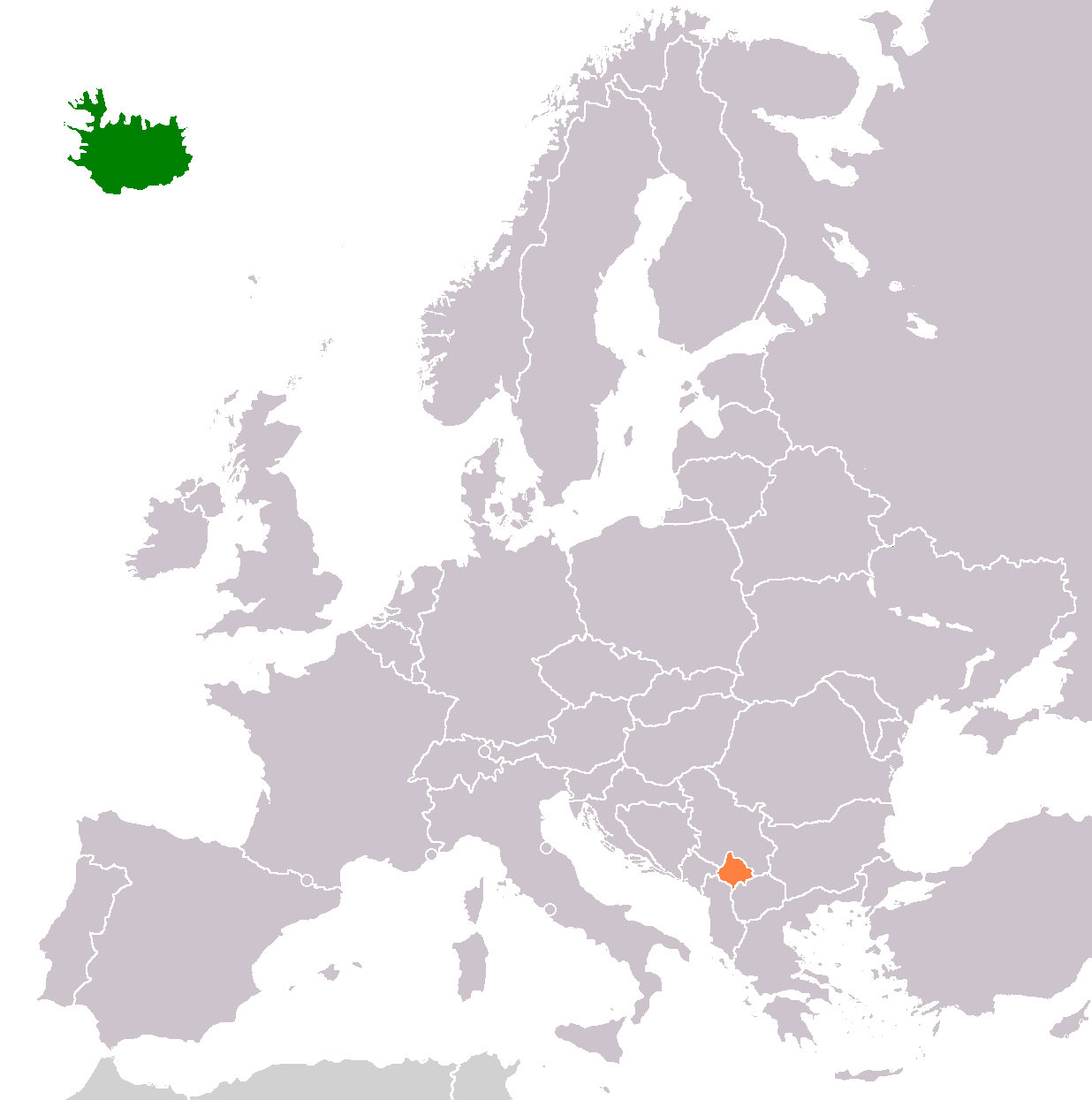
- Iceland: Kosovo

Iceland–Kosovo relations are foreign relations between Iceland and the Republic of Kosovo. Kosovo declared its independence from Serbia on 17 February 2008 and Iceland recognised it on 5 March 2008. Diplomatic relations were established on 14 November 2011.

== History ==
=== Refugees ===
In 1999, Iceland received 75 refugees that were fleeing the Kosovo War. By early 2000, around half of them had returned home, many at the request of Kosovo authorities. In 2005, it received another group of refugees from Kosovo.

=== KFOR ===
In the early 2000s, Iceland participated in the KFOR mission in Kosovo, with its peacekeepers taking over the management of the Pristina International Airport and training of civilian staff from Italian peacekeepers in 2003. It handed over management of the airport to civilian authorities on 1 April 2004. It was later tasked with assisting the KFOR with the control of the lower airspace in the country.

== High-level visits ==
=== High-level visits from Kosovo to Iceland ===
In February 2023, the president of Kosovo, Vjosa Osmani, visited Iceland and met with prime minister Katrín Jakobsdóttir and foreign minister Þórdís Kolbrún R. Gylfadóttir.

== Resident diplomatic missions ==
- Iceland does not maintain an embassy in Pristina. Relations are managed by the Ministry of Foreign Affairs in Reykjavík.
- Kosovo does not have a diplomatic mission in Iceland. However, Kosovo is represented in Iceland through its embassy in Stockholm, Sweden.

== See also ==
- Foreign relations of Iceland
- Foreign relations of Kosovo
- Kosovo–NATO relations
