= Potential accession of Kosovo to the European Union =

Ongoing accession process of Kosovo to the EU

Process of potential accession of Kosovo to the European Union
- Status: Potential Candidate
Application
Membership application	15 December 2022
Screened & negotiations commence
Negotiations
Chapters closed
Memberships & Treaties
Association Agreement
Economic and monetary policy
Travel
Energy
Foreign and military policy
Human rights and international courts
International Court of Justice (ICJ)
Impact (27+1)
Population	446,828,803
Area	4,233,262 km^{2} 1,634,472 mi^{2}
HDI	0.896
GDP (PPP)	$25.399 trillion
GDP per capita (PPP)	$56,928
GDP	$17.818 trillion
GDP per capita	$39,940
Gini	30.0
Official Languages	24

The potential accession of Kosovo to the European Union (EU) is on the agenda for future enlargement of the EU. Kosovo is currently recognized by the EU as a potential candidate for accession.

Kosovo's declaration of independence from Serbia was enacted on 17 February 2008 by a vote of members of the Assembly of Kosovo. Independence has not been recognised by Serbia, or five out of 27 EU member states, and as a result the European Union itself refers only to "Kosovo", with an asterisked footnote containing the text agreed to by the Belgrade–Pristina negotiations: "This designation is without prejudice to positions on status, and is in line with UNSCR 1244 and the ICJ Opinion on the Kosovo Declaration of Independence." This has not prevented Kosovo from continuing its EU enacted Stabilisation Tracking Mechanism (STM) programme, aiming to gradually integrate its national policies on legal, economic and social matters with the EU, so that at some point in the future Kosovo could qualify for EU membership.

To ensure stability at the territory and neutral rule of law enforcement, the EU is operating in Kosovo under the umbrella of the United Nations Interim Administration Mission in Kosovo (UNMIK), deploying police and civilian resources under the European Union Rule of Law Mission (EULEX).

The Stabilisation and Association Agreement (SAA) between the EU and Kosovo was signed on 26 February 2016 and went into force on 1 April 2016.

On 6 February 2018, the European Commission published its expansion plan to cover up to six Western Balkan countries: Albania, Bosnia and Herzegovina, Kosovo, Montenegro, North Macedonia, and Serbia. The plan envisages that all six applicants could achieve accession as members of the European Union after 2025.

Kosovo formally submitted an application for membership on 15 December 2022.

== Relations and recognition ==
A map of EU member states and their stance on Kosovo's independence Key: Kosovo EU members which recognise Kosovo EU members which have not recognised Kosovo

As of May 2020, 22 of the 27 member states recognise the Republic of Kosovo as an independent state. The EU states that do not recognise Kosovo's independence are Spain, Slovakia, Cyprus, Romania, and Greece. As a result, the European Union itself refers only to "Kosovo", with an asterisked footnote containing the text agreed to by the Belgrade–Pristina negotiations: "This designation is without prejudice to positions on status, and is in line with UNSCR 1244 and the ICJ Opinion on the Kosovo Declaration of Independence."

The European Parliament adopted a resolution on 8 July 2010 calling on all member states to recognise Kosovo. In October 2010, an envoy of the European Parliament suggested that lack of recognition by some countries would not be an obstacle to Kosovo joining the Schengen area's visa-free regime.

All EU member states would need to recognize Kosovo before it could join the EU. Some European officials, including former German Foreign Minister Sigmar Gabriel, have said that they expect Serbia to recognize Kosovo before it joins the EU.

In April 2023, Cyprus, Hungary, Romania and Spain, voted against approving Kosovo's membership for the Council of Europe, while Greece and Slovakia abstained.

=== Kosovo's foreign relations with EU member states ===
- Austria
- Belgium
- Bulgaria
- Croatia
- Cyprus
- Czech Republic
- Denmark
- Estonia
- Finland
- France
- Germany
- Greece
- Hungary
- (Republic of Ireland) Ireland
- Italy
- Latvia
- Lithuania
- Luxembourg
- Malta
- Netherlands
- Poland
- Portugal
- Romania
- Slovakia
- Slovenia
- Spain
- Sweden

== EU presence ==
The European Union Rule of Law Mission in Kosovo (EULEX) is based on United Nations Security Council Resolution 1244, which introduced the international rule of Kosovo in 1999. However, the EU force, which was previously planned to be covered by Security council's approval of Ahtisaari proposal, has not received a new UN Security Council mandate due to the opposition from Russia. Russia specifically blocked transfer of UN facility to the EU mission. Serbia also views the mission as an EU recognition of an independent Kosovo.

A 1,800 to 1,900 strong mission was approved by The European Council on 14 December 2007. This was later increased to 2,000 personnel due to an increase in expected instability due to a lack of an agreement with Serbia. It consists of police officers (including four anti-riot units), prosecutors and judges – hence focusing on issues on the rule of law, including democratic standards. The size of the mission means Kosovo is home to the largest number of EU civil servants outside of Brussels. Chief of the mission is French General Xavier Bout de Marnhac, who replaced Yves de Kermabon on 15 October 2010. He is accountable to the European Union member states.

The EU also appoints the International Civilian Representative for Kosovo (also the European Union Special Representative). The level of EU influence in Kosovo has led some to term it an EU protectorate.

On 25 August 2009, the EULEX mission was subject to violent protests, resulting in the damaging of 28 EU vehicles. Three Kosovo police officers were injured in the clashes which resulted in 21 arrests by the Kosovo police. The attack was organised by a group called "Vetëvendosje!" ("Self-Determination") in reaction to EULEX's police cooperation with Serbia and its actions in Kosovo. There is resentment towards the EU mission for exercising its powers over Kosovo while mediating between the state and Serbia. Policies concentrating on crisis management, rather than resolution, as well as the pursuit of ethnic autonomy and its overly broad mandate over Kosovo's governance is at the stem of the discontent with the EU mission.

== Stabilisation Tracking Mechanism ==
A Stabilisation Tracking Mechanism (STM), established for Kosovo on 6 November 2002, is an association process specially devised to promote policy dialogue between the EU and the Kosovan authorities on EU approximation matters, since it was not able to commence with the Stabilisation and Association Process due to its disputed status. In addition, in March 2007, a new structure of sectoral meetings under the umbrella of the STM was established in the areas of: good governance, economy, internal market, innovation and infrastructure.

== Potential candidacy ==
The EU is divided on their policy towards Kosovo, with 5 of 27 EU member states (Cyprus, Greece, Romania, Slovakia, Spain) not recognising its sovereignty. Kosovo is officially considered a potential candidate for membership by the European Union, and it has been given a clear "European perspective" by the Council of the European Union. As confirmed by the Thessaloniki Summit in June 2003, Kosovo is firmly anchored in the framework of the Stabilisation and Association Process (SAP), the EU policy which applies to the Western Balkans which is designed to prepare potential candidates for membership.

On 20 April 2005 the European Commission adopted the Communication on Kosovo to the Council "A European Future for Kosovo" which reinforced the Commission's commitment to Kosovo. On 20 January 2006, the Council adopted a European Partnership for Serbia and Montenegro including Kosovo as defined by UNSCR1244. The European Partnership is a means to materialise the European perspective of the Western Balkan countries within the framework of the SAP. The Provisional Institutions of Self-Government (PISG) adopted an Action Plan for the Implementation of the European Partnership in August 2006 and this document formed the current working basis between the EU and the PISG. The PISG regularly reported on the implementation of this action plan.

Kosovo's declaration of independence from Serbia was enacted on 17 February 2008 by a vote of members of the Assembly of Kosovo. The fact that the declaration was not recognised by Serbia and several EU member states did not prevent Kosovo from continuing its STM programme, which aimed to gradually integrate its national policies on legal, economic and social matters with EU so that at some point in the future they would qualify for EU membership. As of December 2008, fifteen meetings of the STM have taken place. In addition, in March 2007 a new structure of sectoral meetings under the umbrella of the STM was established in the areas of: good governance, economy, internal market, innovation and infrastructure.

In October 2009, the European Commission noted in its annual report on the progress of the candidates and potential candidates for EU accession that Kosovo faced major challenges including ensuring the rule of law, the fight against corruption and organised crime, the strengthening of administrative capacity, and the protection of the Serb and other minorities. Negotiations for EU membership would only start after Kosovo submits an application and is made an official candidate for membership. Enver Hoxhaj, Kosovo's Minister of Foreign Affairs, has suggested that the EU should admit Serbia and Kosovo simultaneously due to concerns that if Serbia was admitted first they could veto Kosovo's membership.

In May 2014, Hoxhaj said that Kosovo's goal was for EU membership within a decade. In May 2018, Bulgaria – holding the rotating presidency of the Council of the European Union – hosted a summit on the Western Balkans, which aimed to facilitate accession by the six, including enhanced regional security cooperation and regional connectivity. It was noteworthy that the Summit referred to 'partners' rather than states: this reflects the issue that Kosovo is only partially recognised as a state. The European Commission is sensitive to the issue which was addressed in a speech by the EU's High Representative/Vice-President Federica Mogherini at the European Parliament Plenary Session on the Western Balkan Strategy: " shared, unequivocal, concrete perspective for European Union integration for each and every one of the six partners. Each at its own pace, with its own specificities and under different conditions, but the direction is clear and is one ".

On 3 March 2022, a resolution was passed by Kosovo's Parliament requesting that the government "take all necessary steps to join NATO, European Union, Council of Europe and other international organizations". In June 2022, Prime Minister of Kosovo Albin Kurti stated that he planned to formally submit an application for membership by the end of the year. On 15 December 2022, Kosovo formally submitted an application for European Union membership.

== Stabilisation and Association Agreement ==
Prior to applying for full membership in the EU, Kosovo sought to sign a Stabilisation and Association Agreement (SAA) with the EU, which according to the European Parliament "defines rights and obligations of both parties until the EU membership." A feasibility study on the prospects for a SAA with Kosovo was launched by the European Commission in March 2012. On 10 October 2012 the results were published. It found that there were no legal obstacles to this, as full sovereignty is not required for such an agreement, and recommended that negotiations start as soon as Kosovo had made further progress in the four areas: Rule of law, Public administration, Protection of minorities, and Trade.

=== 2013 Brussels Agreement ===
On 19 April 2013, the governments of Kosovo and Serbia completed an agreement that was hailed as a major step towards normalising relations as well as facilitating progress towards EU membership for both countries. The agreement is reported to commit both states not to "block, or encourage others to block, the other side's progress in the respective EU paths." Though it does not amount to a recognition of Kosovo's independence by Belgrade, EU High Representative for Foreign Affairs and Security Policy Catherine Ashton was quoted as saying, "What we are seeing is a step away from the past and, for both of them, a step closer to Europe", whilst Thaçi declared "This agreement will help us heal the wounds of the past if we have the wisdom and the knowledge to implement it in practice." The accord was ratified by the Kosovo assembly on 28 June 2013.

Several days after the agreement was reached, the European Commission recommended authorising the launch of negotiations on a SAA between the EU and Kosovo, as well as starting EU membership negotiations with Serbia. On 28 June 2013, the European Council endorsed the Council of the European Union's conclusions on negotiations with both Kosovo and Serbia.

Negotiations were formally launched on 28 October 2013, and were completed on 2 May 2014. The agreement was initialled on 25 July 2014 and the treaty was signed on 27 October 2015.

It was the first SAA signed after the entry into force of the Lisbon treaty, which conferred legal personality to the EU. As a result, an EU representative in Kosovo explained that "unlike SAA with other countries of the region, this one will be exclusively the EU agreement. The EU will co-sign it as a legal entity." The agreement did not need to be individually ratified by each member state. The representative went on to say that "since Kosovo is not recognised by the five member states, we had to issue a directive saying that the signing of the agreement will not signify that the EU or any of the countries recognise Kosovo as a state." The SAA entered into force on 1 April 2016.

=== State of Stabilisation and Association Agreement ratification ===
Status of SAA ratification

Event	North Macedonia	Croatia	Albania	Montenegro (Note: Montenegro started negotiations in November 2005 while a part of Serbia and Montenegro. Separate technical negotiations were conducted regarding issues of sub-state organizational competency. A mandate for direct negotiations with Montenegro was established in July 2006. Direct negotiations were initiated on 26 September 2006 and concluded on 1 December 2006.)	Bosnia and Herzegovina	Serbia (Note: Serbia started negotiations in November 2005 while part of Serbia and Montenegro, with a modified mandate from July 2006.)	Kosovo (Note: Kosovo declared independence from Serbia in 2008 but is still claimed by Serbia as part of its territory. The European Union remains divided, with five EU member states not recognizing its independence. The EU launched a Stabilisation Tracking Mechanism for Kosovo on 6 November 2002 with the aim of aligning its policy with EU standards. On 10 October 2012 the European Commission found that there were no legal obstacles to Kosovo signing a SAA with the EU, as independence is not required for such an agreement.)
SAA negotiations start	2000-04-05	2000-11-24	2003-01-31	2005-10-10	2005-11-25	2005-10-10	2013-10-28
SAA initialled	2000-11-24	2001-05-14	2006-02-28	2007-03-15	2007-12-04	2007-11-07	2014-07-25
SAA/IA signature	2001-04-09	2001-10-29	2006-06-12	2007-10-15	2008-06-16	2008-04-29	2015-10-27
Interim Agreement:
EC ratification	2001-04-27	2002-01-30	2006-06-12	2007-10-15	2008-06-16	2009-12-08	N/A (Note: No Interim Agreement associated with Kosovo's SAA was concluded.)
SAP state ratification	2001-04-27	2002-01-30	2006-10-09	2007-11-14	2008-06-20	2008-09-22	N/A
entry into force	2001-06-01	2002-03-01	2006-12-01	2008-01-01	2008-07-01	2010-02-01	N/A
Deposit of the instrument of ratification:
SAP state	2001-04-27	2002-01-30	2006-11-09	2007-11-13	2009-02-26	2008-09-22	2016-02-26
Austria	2002-09-06	2002-03-15	2008-05-21	2008-07-04	2009-09-04	2011-01-13	N/A
Belgium	2003-12-29	2003-12-17	2008-10-22	2010-03-29	2010-03-29	2012-03-20	N/A
Bulgaria	joined the EU later			2008-05-30	2009-03-13	2010-08-12	N/A
Croatia	joined the EU later						N/A
Cyprus	joined the EU later		2008-05-30	2008-11-20	2009-07-02	2010-11-26	N/A
Czech Republic	joined the EU later		2008-05-07	2009-02-19	2009-07-23	2011-01-28	N/A
Denmark	2002-04-10	2002-05-08	2008-04-24	2008-06-25	2009-05-26	2011-03-04	N/A
Estonia	joined the EU later		2007-10-17	2007-11-22	2008-09-11	2010-08-19	N/A
Finland	2004-01-06	2004-01-06	2007-11-29	2009-03-18	2009-04-07	2011-10-21	N/A
France	2003-06-04	2003-06-04	2009-02-12	2009-07-30	2011-02-10	2012-01-16	N/A
Germany	2002-06-20	2002-10-18	2009-02-19	2009-11-16	2009-08-14	2012-02-24	N/A
Greece	2003-08-27	2003-08-27	2009-02-26	2010-03-04	2010-09-20	2011-03-10	N/A
Hungary	joined the EU later		2007-04-23	2008-05-14	2008-10-22	2010-11-16	N/A
Ireland	2002-05-06	2002-05-06	2007-06-11	2009-06-04	2009-06-04	2011-09-29	N/A
Italy	2003-10-30	2004-10-06	2008-01-07	2009-10-13	2010-09-08	2011-01-06	N/A
Latvia	joined the EU later		2006-12-19	2008-10-17	2009-11-12	2011-05-30	N/A
Lithuania	joined the EU later		2007-05-17	2009-03-04	2009-05-04	2013-06-26	N/A
Luxembourg	2003-07-28	2003-08-01	2007-07-04	2009-06-11	2010-12-22	2011-01-21	N/A
Malta	joined the EU later		2008-04-21	2008-12-11	2010-01-07	2010-07-06	N/A
Netherlands	2002-09-09	2004-04-30	2007-12-10	2009-01-29	2009-09-30	2012-02-27	N/A
Poland	joined the EU later		2007-04-14	2009-02-06	2010-04-07	2012-01-13	N/A
Portugal	2003-07-14	2003-07-14	2008-07-11	2008-09-23	2009-06-29	2011-03-04	N/A
Romania	joined the EU later			2009-01-15	2010-01-08	2012-05-22	N/A
Slovakia	joined the EU later		2007-07-20	2008-07-29	2009-03-17	2010-11-11	N/A
Slovenia	joined the EU later		2007-01-18	2008-02-07	2009-03-10	2010-12-07	N/A
Spain	2002-10-04	2002-10-04	2007-05-03	2009-03-12	2010-06-15	2010-06-21	N/A
Sweden	2002-06-25	2003-03-27	2007-03-21	2009-03-11	2009-09-14	2011-04-15	N/A
United Kingdom	2002-12-17	2004-09-03	2007-10-16	2010-01-12	2010-04-20	2011-08-11	N/A
European Communities or European Union and Euratom	2004-02-25	2004-12-21	2009-02-26	2010-03-29	2015-04-30	2013-07-22	2016-02-24 (Note: Kosovo's SAA was the first signed after the entry into force of the Lisbon treaty, which conferred a legal personality to the EU. As a result, unlike previous SAAs Kosovo's is exclusively between it and the EU and Euratom, and the member states are not parties independently.)
SAA entry into force	2004-04-01	2005-02-01	2009-04-01	2010-05-01	2015-06-01	2013-09-01	2016-04-01
EU membership (SAA lapsed)	(TBD)	2013-07-01	(TBD)	(TBD)	(TBD)	(TBD)	(TBD)

N/A: Not applicable.

== Unilateral euro adoption ==
Before Kosovo declared independence in 2008, Kosovo's economy had undergone a currency substitution, with the Deutsche Mark being the most used currency. As a result, like Germany, Kosovo (which was then a United Nations mandate) switched to the euro on 1 January 2002. The change to the euro was achieved in cooperation with the European Central Bank, and several national banks in the Eurozone. Kosovo does not mint any coins of its own.

It is unclear how Kosovo's unilateral use of the euro will impact its aspirations for further integration into the EU, which requires that states meet several convergence criteria prior to being allowed to join the eurozone. Montenegro, like Kosovo, has also unilaterally adopted the euro and is currently conducting membership negotiations with the EU. Since Montenegro's application for membership, the European Commission and the ECB have voiced their discontent over its use of the euro on several occasions. A statement attached to Montenegro's Stabilisation and Association Agreement with the EU read: "unilateral introduction of the euro was not compatible with the Treaty." The issue is expected to be resolved through the negotiations process. The ECB has stated that the implications of unilateral euro adoption "would be spelled out at the latest in the event of possible negotiations on EU accession." Diplomats have suggested that it is unlikely Montenegro will be forced to withdraw the euro from circulation in their country.

== Visa liberalisation ==
As of 1 January 2024, holders of Kosovo passports can travel within the Schengen Area, for up to 90 days within a 180 day period without a visa.

Kosovo was the only potential candidate for membership in the Balkans that did not have visa free access for the Schengen Area. The EU and Kosovo launched a visa liberalisation dialogue on 19 January 2012. On 14 June 2012, Kosovo received a roadmap for visa liberalisation with the EU, detailing the necessary reforms. The European Commission formally proposed Kosovo be granted visa free travel in May 2016. The EU stipulated that the approval visa free access for citizens of Kosovo to the Schengen area is conditional on Kosovo approving a border demarcation agreement with Montenegro. The border agreement was approved by Kosovo's parliament in March 2018. A Commission report from July 2018 concluded that Kosovo had met all of the conditions required of it for visa free access to the Schengen area. However, the approval of all EU member states is required to lift existing visa requirements, and several states have blocked the move.

In 2021, the EU Parliament urged the EU Council to implement the visa liberalisation for nationals of Kosovo, after an EU report concluded that Kosovo had met all of the conditions required for visa liberalisation. In November 2022, the EU Council proposed implementing the visa liberalisation on 1 December 2023 at the latest, or at the same as ETIAS if earlier. On 14 December 2022, the EU Council presidency and representatives of the European Parliament agreed to implement visa liberalisation by 1 January 2024 subject to formal approval by the Council and European Parliament. On 9 March, the proposal were unanimously approved by the Council of the EU with all member states present, including the five which have not formally recognised Kosovo's independence, voting in favour. On 23 March 2023, the Civil Liberties, Justice and Home Affairs Committee of the European Parliament supported the visa liberalisation proposal with 47 in votes in favour, 8 against, and 4 abstaining. The proposed regulation to enact the visa liberalization plan was approved at a plenary session of the parliament on 18 April 2023 and was published in the Official Journal the following day. Visa liberalization came into effect on 1 January 2024.

== Public opinion ==
In a 2019 public opinion survey of 1,700 Kosovars conducted by the National Democratic Institute, the average response regarding respondents' opinion of the European Union—1 being very unfavorable and 5 being very favorable—was highly favorable at 4.22, indicating that the nation's accession to the union would likely receive a similar degree of support.

According to the 2025 annual survey of opinion in Kosovo, 64% of citizens have a positive attitude towards the EU (20% very positive, 44% fairly positive), while trust in the EU is 78%.

== Chronology of relations with the EU ==
Timeline
Date	Event
1 April 2005	The European Commission adopts a communication on A European Future for Kosovo
4 February 2008	European Council adopts Joint Action establishing EU Rule of Law mission in Kosovo EULEX
18 February 2008	Council acknowledges Kosovo's declaration of independence, underlines EU conviction that Kosovo is a sui generis case. Main article: Kosovo independence precedent
15 June 2008	Kosovo adopts its Constitution
9 December 2008	EULEX becomes operational
14 October 2009	Commission issues communication Kosovo-Fulfilling its European Perspective
22 July 2010	The International Court of Justice issues advisory opinion on Kosovo's declaration of independence
8 March 2011	Following a UN General Assembly Resolution the Kosovo-Serbia technical dialogue begins
19 January 2012	Commission launches the visa liberalisation dialogue with Kosovo
30 May 2012	Commission launches the Structured Dialogue on the Rule of Law
14 July 2012	Commission issues Kosovo's visa liberalisation roadmap
10 September 2012	Kosovo declares the end of supervised independence
10 October 2012	European Commission issues its feasibility study for a Stabilisation and Association Agreement between the EU and Kosovo
19 October 2012	High-level dialogue between Kosovo and Serbia as facilitated by HRVP Ashton begins
25 July 2014	The EU and Kosovo chief negotiators initialled the Stabilisation and Association Agreement between the EU and Kosovo in Brussels
1 April 2016	The Stabilisation and Association Agreement between the EU and Kosovo enters into force
1 July 2018	Commission confirms that Kosovo has fulfilled all outstanding visa liberalisation benchmarks. Decision on Commission's proposal is pending in the EP and the Council.
15 December 2022	Kosovo applies for EU membership.
1 January 2024	Schengen Area countries abolished visa requirements for Kosovo.

== Negotiations ==
Negotiation talks have not yet started.

Chapter and screening dates
Progression	0 / 35 0% complete	0 / 35 0% complete	0 / 35 0% complete	0 / 35 0% complete
Acquis chapter	Screening started	Screening completed	Chapter opened	Chapter closed
Overview	0 out of 35	0 out of 35	0 out of 35	0 out of 35
1. Free Movement of Goods				
2. Freedom of Movement For Workers				
3. Right of Establishment & Freedom To Provide Services				
4. Free Movement of Capital				
5. Public Procurement				
6. Company Law				
7. Intellectual Property Law				
8. Competition Policy				
9. Financial Services				
10. Information Society & Media				
11. Agriculture & Rural Development				
12. Food Safety, Veterinary & Phytosanitary Policy				
13. Fisheries				
14. Transport Policy				
15. Energy				
16. Taxation				
17. Economic & Monetary Policy				
18. Statistics				
19. Social Policy & Employment				
20. Enterprise & Industrial Policy				
21. Trans-European Networks				
22. Regional Policy & Coordination of Structural Instruments				
23. Judiciary & Fundamental Rights				
24. Justice, Freedom & Security				
25. Science & Research				
26. Education & Culture				
27. Environment & Climate Change				
28. Consumer & Health Protection				
29. Customs Union				
30. External Relations				
31. Foreign, Security & Defence Policy				
32. Financial Control				
33. Financial & Budgetary Provisions				
34. Institutions				
35. Other Issues (Relations with Serbia)				

November 2026 European Commission Report
Acquis chapter	Status as of Nov 2025	Chapter Status as of August 2026
Overview	5 chapters in early stage, 1 chapter in early stage/with some preparation, 15 chapters with some level of preparation, 2 chapters with some/moderate preparation, 8 chapters with a moderate level of preparation	34 unopened chapters
1. Free Movement of Goods	Some / Moderate	Chapter unopened
2. Freedom of Movement For Workers	Some level of preparation	Chapter unopened
3. Right of Establishment & Freedom To Provide Services	Moderately prepared	Chapter unopened
4. Free Movement of Capital	Moderately prepared	Chapter unopened
5. Public Procurement	Some / Moderate	Chapter unopened
6. Company Law	Some level of preparation	Chapter unopened
7. Intellectual Property Law	Moderately prepared	Chapter unopened
8. Competition Policy	Some level of preparation	Chapter unopened
9. Financial Services	Moderately prepared	Chapter unopened
10. Information Society & Media	Some level of preparation	Chapter unopened
11. Agriculture & Rural Development	Some level of preparation	Chapter unopened
12. Food Safety, Veterinary & Phytosanitary Policy	Moderately prepared	Chapter unopened
13. Fisheries	Early stage	Chapter unopened
14. Transport Policy	Some level of preparation	Chapter unopened
15. Energy	Some level of preparation	Chapter unopened
16. Taxation	Some level of preparation	Chapter unopened
17. Economic & Monetary Policy	Moderately prepared	Chapter unopened
18. Statistics	Some level of preparation	Chapter unopened
19. Social Policy & Employment	Some level of preparation	Chapter unopened
20. Enterprise & Industrial Policy	Moderately prepared	Chapter unopened
21. Trans-European Networks	Some level of preparation	Chapter unopened
22. Regional Policy & Coordination of Structural Instruments	Early stage	Chapter unopened
23. Judiciary & Fundamental Rights	Early stage/Some	Chapter unopened
24. Justice, Freedom & Security	Some level of preparation	Chapter unopened
25. Science & Research	Early stage	Chapter unopened
26. Education & Culture	Some level of preparation	Chapter unopened
27. Environment & Climate Change	Early stage	Chapter unopened
28. Consumer & Health Protection	Early stage	Chapter unopened
29. Customs Union	Moderately prepared	Chapter unopened
30. External Relations	Some level of preparation	Chapter unopened
31. Foreign, Security & Defence Policy	Some level of preparation	Chapter unopened
32. Financial Control	Some level of preparation	Chapter unopened
33. Financial & Budgetary Provisions	— (Note: This chapter was not included in the report.)	Chapter unopened
34. Institutions	Nothing to adopt	Nothing to adopt
35. Other Issues - Normalisation with Serbia	No assessment scale	Chapter unopened
Legend: Well advanced Good / Well advanced Good level of preparation Moderate / Good Moderately prepared Some / Moderate Some level of preparation Early stage / Some Early stage

Report history
Clusters	Acquis Chapter	November 2015	November 2016	April 2018	May 2019	October 2020	October 2021	October 2022	November 2023	October 2024	November 2025	November 2026
1. Fundamentals	Public administration reform	Some level of preparation	Some level of preparation	Some level of preparation	Some level of preparation	Some level of preparation	Some level of preparation	Some level of preparation	Some level of preparation	Some level of preparation	Some level of preparation	Some level of preparation
1. Fundamentals	23. Judiciary & Fundamental Rights	—	—	Early stage/Some	Early stage/Some	Early stage/Some	Early stage/Some	Early stage/Some	Early stage/Some	Early stage/Some	Early stage/Some	Early stage/Some
1. Fundamentals	24. Justice, Freedom & Security	Early stage	Early stage/Some	Early stage/Some	Early stage/Some	Early stage/Some	Early stage/Some	Early stage/Some	Early stage/Some	Some level of preparation	Some level of preparation	Some level of preparation
1. Fundamentals	Economic criteria	Early stage	Early stage	Early stage	Early stage	Early stage	Early stage	Early stage	Early stage/Some	Some level of preparation	Some level of preparation	Some level of preparation
1. Fundamentals	5. Public Procurement	Early stage	Some level of preparation	Some level of preparation	Some level of preparation	Some/Moderate	Some/Moderate	Some/Moderate	Some/Moderate	Some/Moderate	Some/Moderate	Some/Moderate
1. Fundamentals	18. Statistics	Early stage	Early stage/Some	Some level of preparation	Some level of preparation	Some level of preparation	Some level of preparation	Some level of preparation	Some level of preparation	Some level of preparation	Some level of preparation	Some level of preparation
1. Fundamentals	32. Financial Control	Early stage	Early stage	Early stage	Some level of preparation	Some level of preparation	Some level of preparation	Some level of preparation	Some level of preparation	Some level of preparation	Some level of preparation	Some level of preparation
2. Internal Market	1. Free Movement of Goods	Early stage	Early stage/Some	Early stage/Some	Some level of preparation	Some level of preparation	Some level of preparation	Some level of preparation	Some/Moderate	Some/Moderate	Some/Moderate	Some/Moderate
2. Internal Market	2. Freedom of Movement For Workers	Early stage (Note: Chapters 2, 3, 6, and 9 are merged in this report.)	Early stage	Moderately prepared (Note: Chapters 2 and 3 are merged in this report.)	Moderately prepared	Moderately prepared	Moderately prepared	Some level of preparation	Some level of preparation	Some level of preparation	Some level of preparation	Some level of preparation
2. Internal Market	3. Right of Establishment & Freedom To Provide Services	Early stage	Early stage	Moderately prepared	Moderately prepared	Moderately prepared	Moderately prepared	Moderately prepared	Moderately prepared	Moderately prepared	Moderately prepared	Moderately prepared
2. Internal Market	4. Free Movement of Capital	Some level of preparation	Some level of preparation	Some level of preparation	Some level of preparation	Some level of preparation	Some level of preparation	Some level of preparation	Moderately prepared	Moderately prepared	Moderately prepared	Moderately prepared
2. Internal Market	6. Company Law	Early stage	Early stage	Early stage	Some level of preparation	Some level of preparation	Some level of preparation	Some level of preparation	Some level of preparation	Some level of preparation	Some level of preparation	Some level of preparation
2. Internal Market	7. Intellectual Property Law	Some level of preparation	Some level of preparation	Some level of preparation	Some level of preparation	Some level of preparation	Some level of preparation	Some level of preparation	Moderately prepared	Moderately prepared	Moderately prepared	Moderately prepared
2. Internal Market	8. Competition Policy	Early stage	Early stage	Early stage	Early stage	Early stage/Some	Early stage/Some	Some level of preparation	Some level of preparation	Some level of preparation	Some level of preparation	Some level of preparation
2. Internal Market	9. Financial Services	Early stage	Early stage	Moderately prepared	Moderately prepared	Moderately prepared	Moderately prepared	Moderately prepared	Moderately prepared	Moderately prepared	Moderately prepared	Moderately prepared
2. Internal Market	28. Consumer & Health Protection	Early stage (Note: Chapters 19 and 28 are merged in this report.)	Early stage	Early stage	Early stage	Early stage	Early stage	Early stage	Early stage	Early stage	Early stage	Early stage
3. Competitiveness; and inclusive growth	10. Information Society & Media	Some level of preparation	Some level of preparation	Some level of preparation	Some level of preparation	Some level of preparation	Some level of preparation	Some level of preparation	Some level of preparation	Some level of preparation	Some level of preparation	Some level of preparation
3. Competitiveness; and inclusive growth	16. Taxation	Early stage	Early stage	Early stage	Some level of preparation	Some level of preparation	Some level of preparation	Some level of preparation	Some level of preparation	Some level of preparation	Some level of preparation	Some level of preparation
3. Competitiveness; and inclusive growth	17. Economic & Monetary Policy	—	—	—	—	—	—	Moderately prepared	Moderately prepared	Moderately prepared	Moderately prepared	Moderately prepared
3. Competitiveness; and inclusive growth	19. Social Policy & Employment	Early stage	Early stage	Early stage	Early stage	Early stage	Early stage	Early stage	Early stage	Early stage/Some	Some level of preparation	Some level of preparation
3. Competitiveness; and inclusive growth	20. Enterprise & Industrial Policy	Some level of preparation	Some level of preparation	Moderately prepared	Moderately prepared	Moderately prepared	Moderately prepared	Moderately prepared	Moderately prepared	Moderately prepared	Moderately prepared	Moderately prepared
3. Competitiveness; and inclusive growth	25. Science & Research	Early stage (Note: Chapters 25 and 26 are merged in this report.)	Early stage	Early stage	Early stage	Early stage	Early stage	Early stage	Early stage	Early stage	Early stage	Early stage
3. Competitiveness; and inclusive growth	26. Education & Culture	Early stage	Early stage	Early stage	Early stage	Early stage	Early stage	Early stage	Some level of preparation	Some level of preparation	Some level of preparation	Some level of preparation
3. Competitiveness; and inclusive growth	29. Customs Union	Moderately prepared	Moderately prepared	Moderately prepared	Moderately prepared	Moderately prepared	Moderately prepared	Moderately prepared	Moderately prepared	Moderately prepared	Moderately prepared	Moderately prepared
4. Green agenda; and sustainable connectivity	14. Transport Policy	Early stage (Note: Chapters 14 and 21 are merged in this report.)	Early stage/Some	Early stage/Some	Early stage/Some	Early stage/Some	Early stage/Some	Early stage	Early stage	Early stage	Some level of preparation	Some level of preparation
4. Green agenda; and sustainable connectivity	15. Energy	Early stage	Early stage	Early stage	Some level of preparation	Some level of preparation	Some level of preparation	Some level of preparation	Some level of preparation	Some level of preparation	Some level of preparation	Some level of preparation
4. Green agenda; and sustainable connectivity	21. Trans-European Networks	Early stage	Early stage/Some	Some level of preparation	Some level of preparation	Some level of preparation	Some level of preparation	Some level of preparation	Some level of preparation	Some level of preparation	Some level of preparation	Some level of preparation
4. Green agenda; and sustainable connectivity	27. Environment & Climate Change	Early stage	Early stage	Early stage	Early stage	Early stage	Early stage	Early stage	Early stage	Early stage	Early stage	Early stage
5. Resources, agriculture; and cohesion	11. Agriculture & Rural Development	Some level of preparation (Note: Chapters 11 and 12 are merged in this report.)	Some level of preparation	Some level of preparation	Some level of preparation	Some level of preparation	Some level of preparation	Some level of preparation	Some level of preparation	Some level of preparation	Some level of preparation	Some level of preparation
5. Resources, agriculture; and cohesion	12. Food Safety, Veterinary & Phytosanitary Policy	Some level of preparation	Some level of preparation	Some level of preparation	Some level of preparation	Some level of preparation	Some level of preparation	Some level of preparation	Some/Moderate	Some/Moderate	Moderately prepared	Moderately prepared
5. Resources, agriculture; and cohesion	13. Fisheries	—	Early stage	Early stage	Early stage	Early stage	Early stage	Early stage	Early stage	Early stage	Early stage	Early stage
5. Resources, agriculture; and cohesion	22. Regional Policy & Coordination of Structural Instruments	—	—	—	—	—	—	Early stage	Early stage	Early stage	Early stage	Early stage
5. Resources, agriculture; and cohesion	33. Financial & Budgetary Provisions	—	—	—	—	—	—	—	—	—	—	—
6. External relations	30. External Relations	Early stage	Early stage	Early stage	Early stage	Early stage	Early stage	Early stage	Early stage	Early stage	Some level of preparation	Some level of preparation
6. External relations	31. Foreign, Security & Defence Policy	—	—	—	—	—	—	—	—	—	—	Some level of preparation
	34. Institutions	N/A	N/A	N/A	N/A	N/A	N/A	N/A	N/A	N/A	N/A	N/A
	35. Other Issues - Normalisation with Serbia	No assessment scale	No assessment scale	No assessment scale	No assessment scale	No assessment scale	No assessment scale	No assessment scale	No assessment scale	No assessment scale	No assessment scale	No assessment scale
Legend: Well advanced Good / Well advanced Good level of preparation Moderate / Good Moderately prepared Some / Moderate Some level of preparation Early stage / Some Early stage Notes:

European Commission progress reports on Kosovo date back to before its declaration of independence from Serbia. This includes 2005, 2006, 2007, 2008, 2009, 2010, 2011, 2012 (for the SAA), 2013, and 2014.

== See also ==
- Political status of Kosovo
- Enlargement of the European Union
- Accession of Albania to the European Union
- Accession of Bosnia and Herzegovina to the European Union
- Accession of Montenegro to the European Union
- Accession of North Macedonia to the European Union
- Accession of Serbia to the European Union
- United Nations Security Council Resolution 1244
- Yugoslavia and the European Economic Community
