= Spain's reaction to the 2008 Kosovo declaration of independence =

Kosovo's declaration of independence from Serbia was unilaterally declared on Sunday, 17 February 2008 by a unanimous vote of the Assembly of Kosovo. All 11 representatives of the Serb minority boycotted the proceedings. International reaction was mixed, and the world community continues to be divided on the issue, with 118 of 193 UN member states recognizing Kosovo's independence. Spain's reaction to the declaration was, and remains, one of non-recognition. Spain considers that the unilateral declaration of independence "does not respect international law". It has been alleged that Spain's resistance to recognition is in relation to the Catalan independence movement.

== History ==
On 18 February 2008, Spanish Foreign Minister Miguel Ángel Moratinos said that Spain would not recognise Kosovo because the declaration of independence did not respect international law. He also said that the independence of Kosovo would only be legal if it was the result of agreement by all sides involved or if there had been a UNSC resolution. Spain will not take part in the EULEX mission until legal questions over how it will replace the UN administration are answered. Moratinos told a meeting of EU Foreign Ministers in Slovenia that Spain will not send its contingent to the EULEX mission until there has been a formal transfer of powers from the UN.

In February 2009, Ambassador of Spain to Serbia Íñigo de Palacio España said that Spain's position not to recognise Kosovo independence "would not change even after the adoption of the resolution by the European Parliament" and that "Most UN members do not recognize Kosovo's independence. Just 54 of 194 have recognized. The EP resolution is not mandatory and was adopted by a narrow majority, which indicated that there was a division within the institution on the issue of Kosovo's independence".

In May 2009 José Manuel García-Margallo, Spanish member of the EU parliament, said that Spain does not recognise Kosovo because of principles related to Spain's Galicia, Basque, and Catalonia autonomous communities. However, he also stressed that these Spanish autonomous communities are not comparable with Kosovo, which is fundamentally different. García-Margallo said that despite Spain's non-recognition of Kosovo, it would continue to support Kosovo and its development. On 14 May 2009, Juan Fernando López Aguilar, head of the Spanish Socialist Workers' Party (PSOE) list for the European Parliament Elections (and former Minister of Justice), hinted that Spain might recognise Kosovo in the very long run, referring to the development of relations between Spain and Israel. At the press conference during the 64th Session of the United Nations General Assembly, the then Prime Minister of Spain José Luis Rodríguez Zapatero said that Spain has a consistent position on the question of recognition of the creation of independent States that required the respect of international law and that from Spain's point of view, it was not correct to recognise Kosovo. He stated that Spain would not change its position despite more than 60 countries that recognised and that "the question could be the reverse: why are there more than 100 countries that have not recognized Kosovo and why do those 60 not see what the other 100 see?".

In March 2012, during a fierce debate between Spanish Prime Minister Mariano Rajoy and Catalan MP and Convergence and Union spokesman Josep Antoni Duran i Lleida, Rajoy stated that he is opposed to the recognition of Kosovo as this is what suits the interests of Spain.

However, after the arrival of the socialist Pedro Sánchez to the government, the Ministry of Foreign Affairs stated that "they are working in finding new solutions", especially if an agreement between Serbia and Kosovo is reached.

On 31 March 2021, Spain's public TV broadcaster RTVE refused to refer to Kosovo as a country during a 2022 FIFA World Cup qualification match against them, and also using the word "Kosovo" in lower case throughout the match.

In August 2022, Spanish Prime Minister Pedro Sánchez reaffirmed the country's opposition to its recognition, stating that the Kosovo declaration of independence violates international law.

In April 2023, Spain along with Azerbaijan, Cyprus, Georgia, Hungary, Romania and Serbia voted against approving Kosovo's membership in the Council of Europe.

Spain recognised Kosovo passports as valid travel documents in January 2024. Despite the recognition of passports, Spanish Foreign Minister José Manuel Albares stated that Spain's position of non-recognition of Kosovo's independence would remain unchanged.

== See also ==
- Serbia–Spain relations
- International recognition of Kosovo
