= Greece–Portugal relations =

Diplomatic relations between the Portuguese Republic and the Hellenic Republic

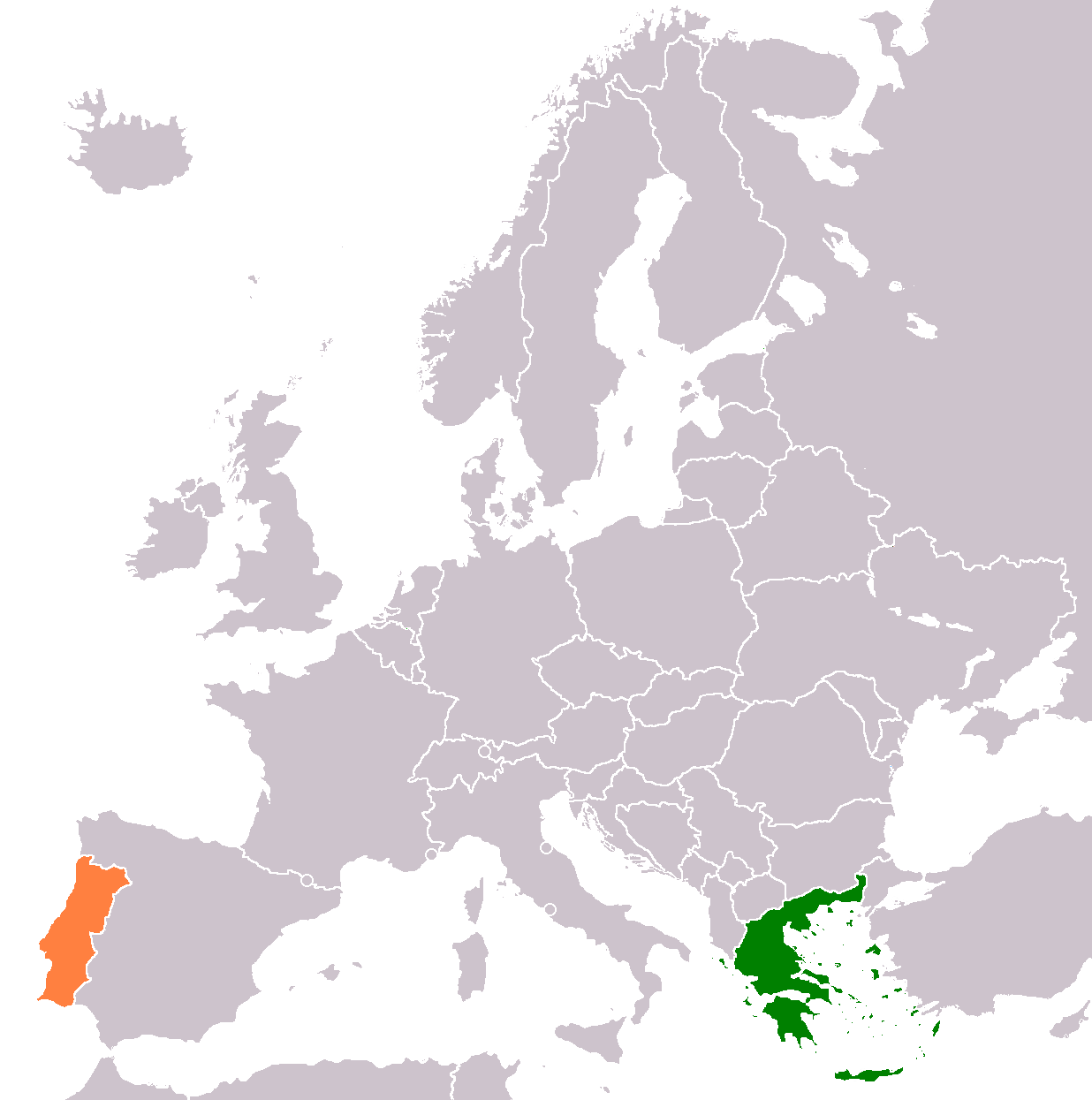
- Greece: Portugal

Greece and Portugal maintain bilateral relations. The diplomatic relations between the two countries date back to 1835, following the independence of Greece. The Greek government sought to establish diplomatic relations with Portugal, and nominated the Count Andreas Metaxas as the first Greek Ambassador non-resident in Lisbon. On 29 May 1924, Portugal recognized, de jure and de facto, the Second Hellenic Republic,. It has kept diplomatic relations with Greece until the present day. Portugal and Greece maintain a strong diplomatic relationship, strengthened by the fact that both countries are present in multiple international organizations, such as the Council of Europe, European Union, NATO and the United Nations.

There are several parallels between the two countries, starting with geographic and demographic factors, since the two countries share a Mediterranean climate and culture, and have a similar geographic area and population. Furthermore, the two countries started processes of democratic transition in the same year, in 1974, and the two countries and peoples have a natural affinity to the ocean, that has taken a relevant role in the history of the two countries.

== History ==
The first interaction between the people that inhabited the territories that nowadays make up Portugal and Greece dates back to the Classic Antiquity, where several contacts between the two territories were registered, mainly with the founding of several Greek colonies in the Iberian Peninsula. In fact, the mythological founder of the Portuguese capital is Odysseus, a legendary figure in Greek Mythology and the protagonist of Homer’s Odyssey, one of the most famous epic poems from Ancient Greece.

The Greek War of Independence, which began in 1821, would renew the relationship between the two countries. The role of the Portuguese António Figueira de Almeida, born in Elvas, in the Alentejo, is of particular relevance in this context. António de Almeida would take part in the philhellenist mission led by the colonel Fabvier and fight in the Greek Independence War alongside volunteers from several European countries. António de Almeida would end up settling in Greece, where he played an active role in the life of the young republic, having arrested one of the two assassins of the first Greek Governor, Ioannis Kapodistrias, in 1831, before rising to the rank of General in the Greek Army. Nowadays, António de Almeida is regarded as one of the cofounders of the Modern Greek Army. After the consolidation of the independence of the Hellenic Republic, the Greek Government established diplomatic relations with Portugal, in 1835, when the first Greek diplomatic representative to Portugal was accredited as Ambassador Non-resident in Lisbon. However, Portugal would only send a diplomatic representative to Greece in 1919, when the Minister Plenipotentiary Martinho Teixeira Brederode, Head of the Portuguese delegation to the Balkans, based in Bucharest, was also given jurisdiction over Greece.

During the period of the Greek War of Independence, the Greek Throne was offered to Pedro, Prince of Portugal, and future King of Portugal and Emperor of Brazil, who would refuse the Greek Crown. Later the Greek Crown was offered to the Bavarian Prince Otto Friedrich Ludwig who accepted, and became King of Greece, as Otto I of Greece.

Following the Democratic Transition in both countries, which took place in both cases in 1974, the relationship between the two countries was renewed, as shown by the signing of several bilateral agreements, and by several state and official visits by statesmen from both countries. After the two countries joined the European Union, Greece in 1981, and Portugal five years later in 1986, the European Union assumed a strong influence in the relationship between the two countries.

== Bilateral agreements ==
Several bilateral agreements have been signed by the two countries, including:

- Treaty on Commerce and Navigation, on 15 August 1938
- Agreement on Cultural and Scientific Cooperation, on 10 July 1980.
- Agreement on Aerial Transportation, on 16 May 1986.
- Convention on the Avoidance of Double Taxation and Prevention of Tax Evasion in matters of Income Taxes, on 2 December 1999.
- Agreement for Cooperation in the Field of Tourism, on 13 March 2018.
- Agreement for Cooperation in Defence Matters, on 12 October 2020

== High-level visits ==
Over the last decades, several high level visits took place, including the following:

=== Visits from Portuguese statesmen to Greece ===
- 16–19 March 1983, António Ramalho Eanes, President of the Republic
- 12–17 December 1988, Mário Soares, President of the Republic
- 1–4 December 2002, Jorge Sampaio, President of the Republic
- 11 April 2016, António Costa, Prime Minister
- 9 September 2016, António Costa, Prime Minister
- 6 September 2017, Marcelo Rebelo de Sousa, President of the Republic;
- 12–14 March 2018, Marcelo Rebelo de Sousa, President of the Republic and Augusto Santos Silva, Minister of Foreign Affairs;
- 10 and 11 October 2019, Marcelo Rebelo de Sousa, President of the Republic

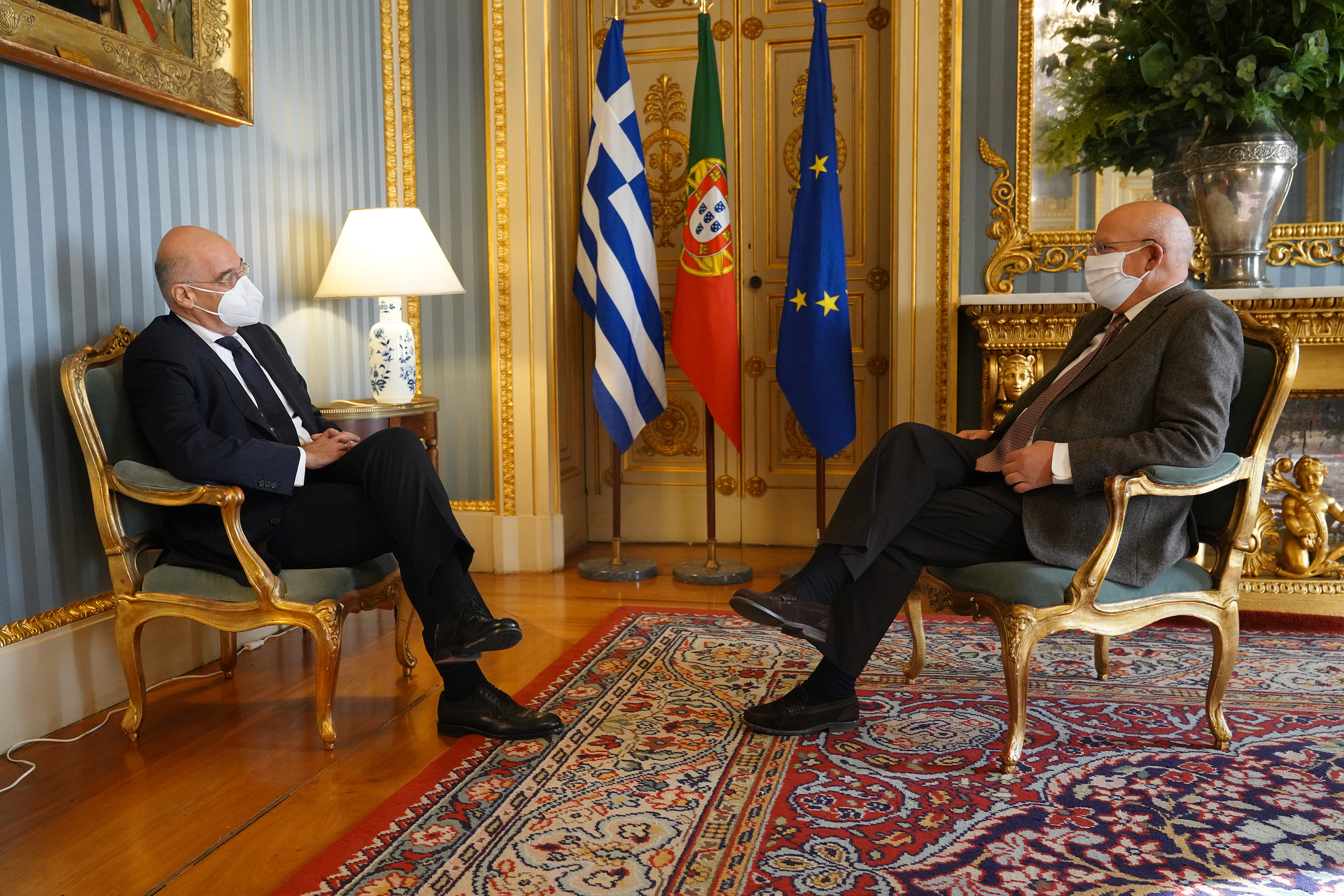
Augusto Santos Silva and Nikos Dendias, Ministers of Foreign Affairs of Portugal and Greece, meet in Lisbon

=== Visits from Greek statesmen to Portugal ===
- 27 and 28 October 1954, Marshall Alexandre Papagos, Prime Minister
- 24–29 June 1981, Constantino Karamanlis, President of the Republic
- 6–9 May 1987, Christos Sartzetakis, President of the Republic
- 6 September 1996, Theodoros Pangalos, Minister of Foreign Affairs
- 1–4 December 1999, Konstantinos Stephanopoulos, President of the Republic
- 15 June 2007, Kostas Karamanlis, Prime-Minister
- 6 September 2017, Prokopios Pavlopoulos, President of the Republic
- 11 January 2021, Kyriakos Mitsotakis, Prime Minister
- 13 January 2021, Nikos Dendias, Minister of Foreign Affairs

== Economic relations ==
Portugal and Greece have a sturdy economic relation, as both countries are member states of the European Union, and consequently of the European single market.

In 2020, the total value of Portuguese exports to Greece was of 155.6 million euro, while imports amounted to 119.2 million euro, which represents a surplus for the Portuguese side of 36.4 million euro. Throughout the 2016-2020 period, an average annual growth of 8.7% of Portuguese exports to Greece was registered, which contrasted with an average annual decrease of 3.5% in the Portuguese imports from Greece in the same period. The main products exported from Portugal to Greece in 2020 were Vehicles and Other Transportation Materials, cellulose pulp and paper, and Plastics and Rubber, while the main products exported by Greece to the Portuguese market were, in the same year, agricultural products, and Diverse Machinery.

In 2019, Greece was the 32nd largest importer and 38th largest exporter from and to Portugal, while Portugal was in the same year the 35th largest importer and 37th largest exporter from and to Greece.

== EU ==
Greece joined the EU in 1981. Portugal joined the EU in 1986.

== Diplomatic missions ==
- Portugal has an embassy in Athens. Portugal also has 2 Honorary Consulates in Greece, in Piraeus and Thessaloniki.
- Greece has an embassy in Lisbon.

== See also ==
- Foreign relations of Greece
- Foreign relations of Portugal
- NATO-EU relations
