= Kosovo–Portugal relations =

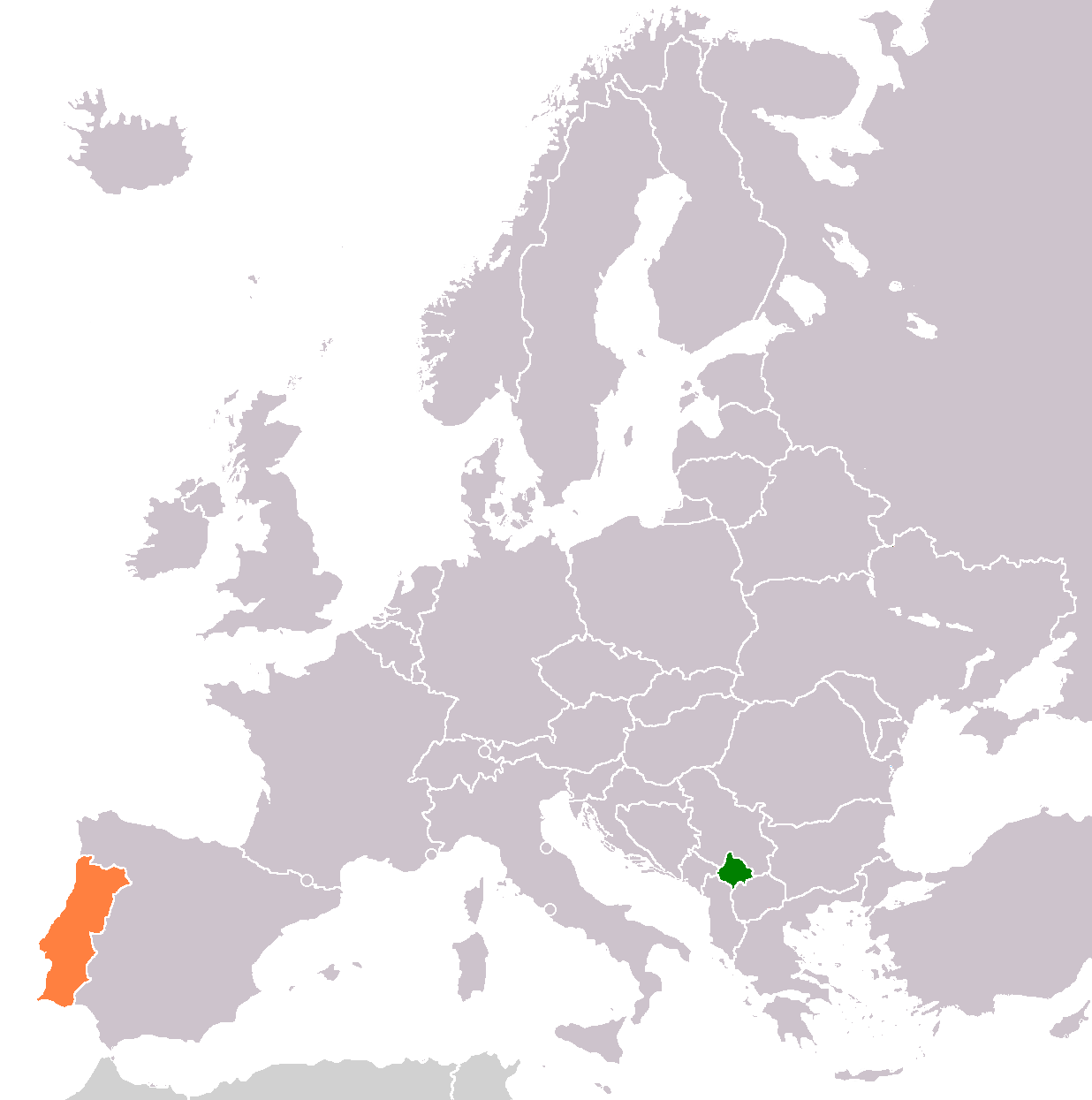
- Kosovo: Portugal

Kosovo–Portugal relations are foreign relations between the Republic of Kosovo and the Portuguese Republic. Kosovo declared its independence on 17 February 2008 and Portugal recognised it on 7 October 2008. Kosovo has formally announced its decision to open an embassy in Lisbon.

== History ==
When NATO intervened in the Kosovo War, Portugal prepared to assist if needed in the 1999 NATO bombing of Yugoslavia. Portugal provided troops as part of NATO peacekeeping efforts in Kosovo. After the end of hostilities, Portugal proposed a stabilisation programme for the Preševo Valley in Serbia just north of Kosovo. Portugal recognised Kosovo's independence from Serbia in October 2008.

== Military ==
Portugal currently has 266 troops serving in Kosovo as peacekeepers in the NATO led Kosovo Force.

== See also ==
- Foreign relations of Kosovo
- Foreign relations of Portugal
- Kosovo-NATO relations
- Accession of Kosovo to the EU
- Portugal–Serbia relations
