= Foreign relations of Portugal =

Foreign relations of Portugal are linked with its historical role as a major player in the Age of Discovery and the holder of the now defunct Portuguese Empire. Portugal is a European Union member country and a founding member of NATO. It is a committed proponent of European integration and transatlantic relations. Paulo Rangel is the current Minister of Foreign Affairs of Portugal.

== Historical ==
Historically, the focus of Portuguese diplomacy has been to preserve its independence, vis-à-vis, the danger of annexation by Spain, and the maintenance of the Anglo-Portuguese Alliance, which officially came into being in 1386, and with the United Kingdom as a successor to England, it is still in place today.

Other goals have also been constant such as the political stability of the Iberian Peninsula and the affirmation of Portuguese interests in Europe and the Atlantic (also in the Indian and Pacific Oceans throughout different moments in history).

== International organizations ==
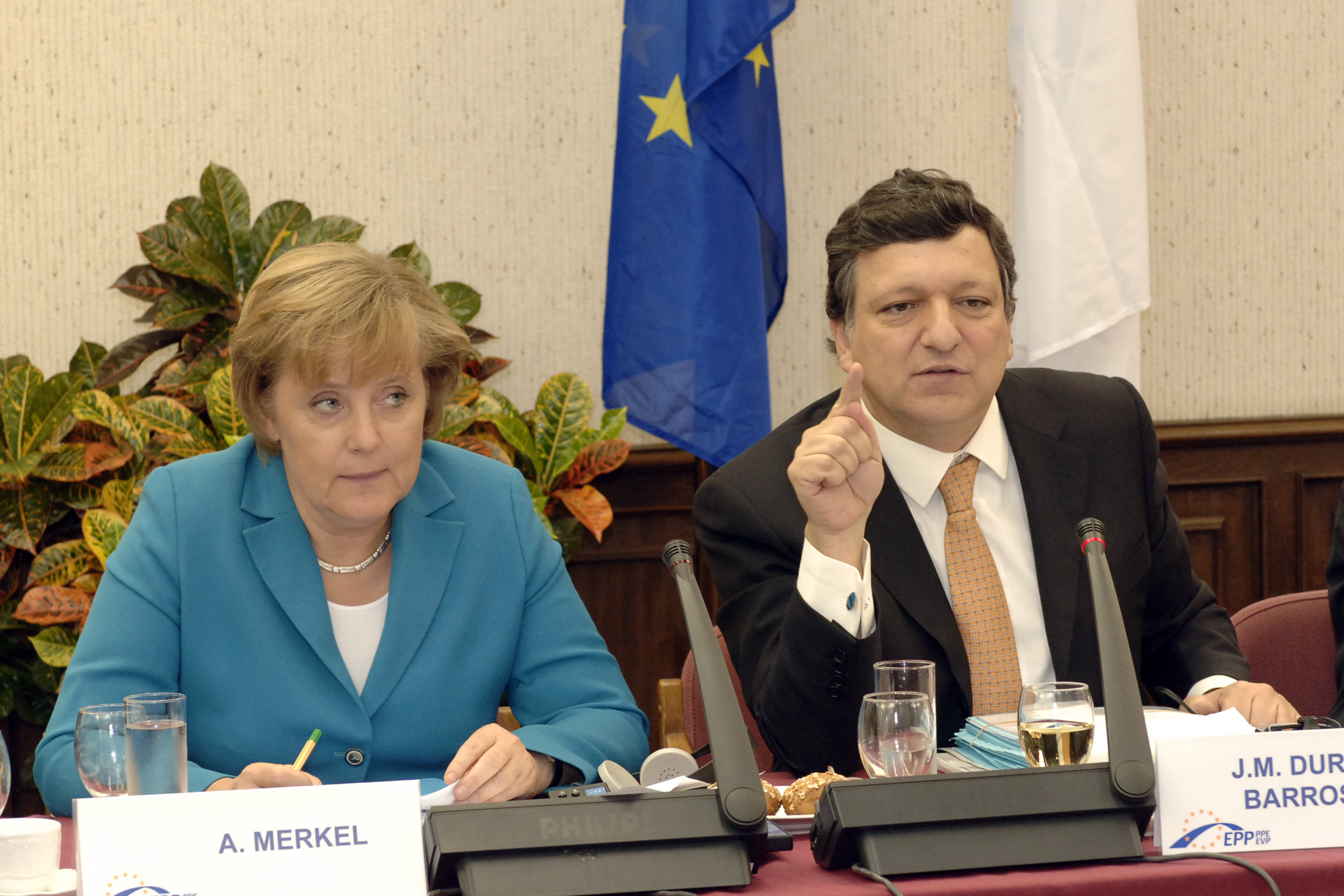
Angela Merkel and José Manuel Barroso

Portugal was a founding member of NATO (1949), Organisation for Economic Co-operation and Development (1961), and European Free Trade Area (1960); it left the latter in 1986 to join the European Economic Community, which would become the European Union (EU) in 1993. In 1996, it co-founded the Community of Portuguese Language Countries (CPLP). The country is a member state of the United Nations since 1955.

Recently, the primacy of the United States and inter-governmental organizations such as NATO and the United Nations have also been paramount in the affirmation of Portugal abroad.

Portugal has been a significant beneficiary of the EU. It was among the top beneficiaries of the EU-15 between 1995 and 2004 (only behind Spain and Greece in absolute terms, and behind Ireland and Greece in a per capita basis). Portugal is a proponent of European integration and held the presidency of the European Union for the second time during the first half of 2000, and again in the second half of 2007. Portugal used its term to launch a dialogue between the EU and Africa and to begin to take steps to make the European economy dynamic and competitive. In 2002, the euro began to circulate as Portugal's currency. José Sócrates, as Prime Minister of Portugal, presided over the rotative Presidency of the Council of the European Union for the period July–December 2007. In this post, Sócrates and his team focused on the EU-Brazil (1st EU-Brazil summit) and EU-African Union (2007 Africa-EU Summit) relations, as well as in the approval of the Treaty of Lisbon.

Portugal was a founding member of NATO; it is an active member of the alliance by, for example, contributing proportionally large contingents in Balkan peacekeeping forces. Portugal proposed the creation of the Community of Portuguese Language Countries (CPLP) to improve its ties with other Portuguese-speaking countries. Additionally, Portugal has participated, along with Spain, in a series of Ibero-American Summit. Portugal held the chairmanship of the Organization for Security and Co-operation in Europe (OSCE) for the year 2002. The chairman-in-office was Portuguese Foreign Minister António Martins da Cruz.

== Disputes ==
Portugal holds claim to the disputed territory of Olivença on the Portugal-Spain border.

== International visits ==
- List of international prime ministerial trips made by Luís Montenegro
- List of international prime ministerial trips made by António Costa

== Diplomatic relations ==
List of countries which Portugal maintains diplomatic relations with:

#	Country	Date
1	Spain	5 October 1143
2	United Kingdom	9 May 1386
—	Holy See	12 February 1481
3	France	7 January 1485
4	Iran	1513
5	Netherlands	February 1641
6	Denmark	18 March 1641
7	Sweden	10 June 1641
8	Russia	24 October 1779
9	United States	13 May 1791
10	Argentina	28 July 1821
11	Brazil	29 August 1825
12	Belgium	20 February 1834
13	Greece	22 July 1835
14	Paraguay	14 February 1846
15	Uruguay	14 February 1846
16	Peru	26 March 1853
17	Colombia	9 April 1857
18	Thailand	10 February 1859
19	Japan	3 August 1860
20	Italy	24 October 1860
21	Switzerland	5 November 1872
22	Bolivia	10 May 1879
23	Mexico	6 December 1879
24	Serbia	14 November 1882
25	Dominican Republic	1 May 1883
26	Guatemala	20 August 1884
27	Luxembourg	21 May 1891
28	Panama	21 May 1904
29	Norway	17 March 1906
30	Chile	26 November 1912
31	Costa Rica	10 July 1913
32	Venezuela	11 December 1913
33	Romania	27 August 1917
34	Cuba	16 May 1919
35	Finland	10 January 1920
36	Czech Republic	18 October 1920
37	Austria	4 April 1922
38	Poland	13 May 1922
39	Egypt	25 June 1925
40	Turkey	28 May 1926
41	Hungary	2 August 1926
42	South Africa	9 September 1935
43	Ireland	26 February 1942
44	Philippines	4 July 1946
45	Iceland	23 January 1948
46	India	12 August 1948
47	Ecuador	28 August 1948
48	Pakistan	4 November 1949
49	Indonesia	13 May 1950
50	Canada	12 April 1952
51	Germany	10 November 1952
52	Sri Lanka	7 January 1953
53	Lebanon	1955
54	Morocco	18 December 1956
55	Tunisia	21 May 1957
56	Nicaragua	3 March 1958
57	Honduras	20 October 1958
58	Ethiopia	6 January 1959
59	Democratic Republic of the Congo	7 July 1960
60	Australia	4 August 1960
61	Madagascar	20 September 1960
62	South Korea	15 April 1961
63	Republic of the Congo	25 May 1961
—	Sovereign Military Order of Malta	19 December 1962
64	Iraq	8 February 1963
65	Haiti	1965
66	El Salvador	15 March 1966
67	Eswatini	6 September 1968
68	Malawi	26 March 1969
69	Jordan	5 July 1972
70	Bulgaria	26 June 1974
71	Mongolia	25 July 1974
72	Senegal	2 September 1974
73	Guinea-Bissau	29 November 1974
74	Bangladesh	16 December 1974
75	Ivory Coast	28 January 1975
76	Gabon	30 January 1975
77	Sierra Leone	18 February 1975
78	Syria	19 February 1975
79	Burundi	22 February 1975
80	Cyprus	5 March 1975
81	Algeria	7 March 1975
82	Liberia	19 March 1975
83	Kuwait	1 April 1975
84	Tanzania	1 April 1975
85	Zambia	3 April 1975
86	Yemen	18 April 1975
—	North Korea (suspended)	22 April 1975
87	Ghana	27 May 1975
88	Mozambique	25 June 1975
89	Vietnam	1 July 1975
90	Niger	10 July 1975
91	Nigeria	10 July 1975
92	São Tomé and Príncipe	18 July 1975
93	Cape Verde	18 July 1975
94	Malta	22 July 1975
95	Malaysia	December 1975
96	Libya	1975
97	Rwanda	12 February 1976
98	Mauritania	3 March 1976
99	Angola	9 March 1976
100	Lesotho	29 March 1976
101	Afghanistan	14 April 1976
102	United Arab Emirates	20 June 1976
103	New Zealand	22 June 1976
104	Bahrain	10 July 1976
105	Seychelles	16 August 1976
106	Nepal	1 September 1976
107	Gambia	8 September 1976
108	Grenada	8 September 1976
109	Papua New Guinea	15 October 1976
110	Myanmar	14 November 1976
111	Mauritius	12 December 1976
112	Mali	17 December 1976
113	Kenya	10 January 1977
114	Cameroon	12 February 1977
115	Central African Republic	15 February 1977
116	Fiji	21 February 1977
117	Suriname	2 May 1977
118	Chad	4 May 1977
119	Equatorial Guinea	9 May 1977
120	Israel	12 May 1977
121	Albania	21 June 1977
122	Benin	25 July 1977
123	Trinidad and Tobago	2 September 1977
124	Togo	17 March 1978
125	Burkina Faso	7 July 1978
126	Guinea	2 January 1979
127	China	2 February 1979
128	Guyana	14 February 1979
129	Jamaica	26 February 1979
130	Oman	26 October 1979
131	Zimbabwe	18 April 1980
132	Botswana	21 April 1980
133	Saudi Arabia	18 July 1980
134	Singapore	7 January 1981
135	Sudan	11 January 1981
136	Qatar	1 May 1982
137	Antigua and Barbuda	20 March 1983
138	Somalia	3 April 1983
139	Vanuatu	30 August 1983
140	Kiribati	15 November 1983
141	Barbados	23 February 1989
142	Estonia	1 October 1991
143	Latvia	2 October 1991
144	Lithuania	4 October 1991
145	Namibia	22 November 1991
146	Uganda	2 December 1991
147	Belarus	26 January 1992
148	Ukraine	27 January 1992
149	Croatia	3 February 1992
150	Slovenia	3 February 1992
151	Liechtenstein	6 February 1992
152	Georgia	23 May 1992
153	Armenia	25 May 1992
154	Cambodia	29 May 1992
155	Azerbaijan	4 August 1992
156	Tajikistan	7 August 1992
157	Turkmenistan	13 August 1992
158	Kyrgyzstan	18 August 1992
159	Kazakhstan	19 August 1992
160	Uzbekistan	28 August 1992
161	Belize	9 December 1992
162	Slovakia	2 January 1993
163	Moldova	10 February 1993
164	Bahamas	27 May 1993
165	North Macedonia	15 November 1994
166	Andorra	22 December 1994
167	Maldives	9 February 1995
168	Marshall Islands	10 February 1995
169	Federated States of Micronesia	24 March 1995
170	Saint Kitts and Nevis	1 March 1995
171	San Marino	27 March 1995
172	Saint Vincent and the Grenadines	12 April 1995
173	Laos	31 May 1995
—	Cook Islands	12 August 1995
174	Eritrea	8 June 1995
175	Samoa	9 June 1995
176	Bosnia and Herzegovina	13 November 1995
177	Djibouti	19 March 1996
178	Brunei	22 March 1996
179	Palau	17 May 1996
180	Saint Lucia	19 September 1996
181	Solomon Islands	20 November 1996
182	Comoros	27 December 1996
183	Dominica	27 December 1996
184	Timor-Leste	20 May 2002
185	Montenegro	17 May 2007
186	Monaco	13 November 2008
187	Tonga	26 November 2008
188	Tuvalu	26 May 2009
189	Nauru	9 September 2009
—	Kosovo	14 November 2011
190	South Sudan	23 April 2013

== Bilateral relationships ==
=== Africa ===
Country	Formal relations began	Notes
Algeria	7 March 1975	Algeria has an embassy in Lisbon.; Portugal has an embassy in Algiers.
Angola	9 March 1976	See Angola–Portugal relations. Portugal ruled Angola for 400 years, colonizing the territory from 1483 until independence in 1975. Angola's war for independence did not end in a military victory for either side, but was suspended as a result of a coup in Portugal, that replaced the Caetano regime with a Military junta.: Angola has an embassy in Lisbon and a consulate-general in Porto.; Portugal has an embassy in Luanda and a consulate-general in Benguela.
Cape Verde	18 July 1975	See Cape Verde–Portugal relations: Cape Verde has an embassy in Lisbon.; Portugal has an embassy in Praia.
Democratic Republic of Congo	7 July 1960	DR Congo has an embassy in Lisbon.; Portugal has an embassy in Kinshasa.
Egypt	24 November 1942	Egypt has an embassy in Lisbon.; Portugal has an embassy in Cairo.
Equatorial Guinea	9 March 1977	Equatorial Guinea has an embassy in Lisbon.; Portugal has an embassy in Malabo.
Ethiopia	1520	Ethiopia is accredited to Portugal from its embassy in Paris, France.; Portugal has an embassy in Addis Ababa.
Guinea-Bissau	29 November 1974	See Guinea-Bissau–Portugal relations: Guinea-Bissau has an embassy in Lisbon and a consulate-general in Albufeira.; Portugal has an embassy in Bissau.
Ivory Coast	28 January 1975	Ivory Coast has an embassy in Lisbon.; Portugal is accredited to Ivory Coast from its embassy in Dakar, Senegal.
Libya	1975	Libya has an embassy in Lisbon.; Portugal's embassy in Tripoli is currently suspended due to the current Libyan Crisis.
Morocco	16 May 1955	See Morocco–Portugal relations: Morocco has an embassy in Lisbon.; Portugal has an embassy in Rabat.
Mozambique	25 June 1975	See Mozambique–Portugal relations. Mozambique gained independence from Portugal in 1975.: Mozambique has an embassy in Lisbon.; Portugal has an embassy in Maputo and a consulate-general in Beira.
Nigeria	10 July 1975	Nigeria has an embassy in Lisbon.; Portugal has an embassy in Abuja.
São Tomé and Príncipe	18 July 1975	See Portugal–São Tomé and Príncipe relations.: Portugal has an embassy in São Tomé.; São Tomé and Príncipe has an embassy in Lisbon.
Senegal	2 September 1974	Portugal has an embassy in Dakar.; Senegal has an embassy in Lisbon.
South Africa	February 1886	See Portugal–South Africa relations.: Portugal has an embassy in Pretoria and consulates-general in Cape Town and Johannesburg.; South Africa has an embassy in Lisbon.
Tanzania		Portugal is accredited to Tanzania from its embassy in Maputo, Mozambique.
Tunisia	21 May 1957	Portugal has an embassy in Tunis.; Tunisia has an embassy in Lisbon.

=== Americas ===
Country	Formal relations began	Notes
Argentina	9 August 1852	See Argentina–Portugal relations: Formal relations between Portugal and Argentina began on 26 May 1812.; Argentina has an embassy in Lisbon.; Portugal has an embassy in Buenos Aires and three honorary consulates (in Comodoro Rivadavia, Mendoza and Rosario).; Both countries are full members of the Organization of Ibero-American States.; Argentine Ministry of Foreign Relations: list of bilateral treaties with Portugal (in Spanish only)
Belize	9 December 1992	Both countries established diplomatic relations on 9 December 1992.
Brazil	29 August 1825	See Brazil–Portugal relations. Relations between Brazil and Portugal have spanned over four centuries, beginning in 1532 with the establishment of São Vicente, the first Portuguese permanent settlement in the Americas, up to the present day. Relations between the two are intrinsically tied because of the Portuguese Empire. They continue to be bound by a common language and ancestral lines in Portuguese Brazilians, which can be traced back hundreds of years.: Brazil has an embassy in Lisbon and consulates-general in Faro and Porto.; Portugal has an embassy in Brasília, consulates-general in Rio de Janeiro, Salvador, São Paulo and consulates in Belém, Belo Horizonte, Curitiba, Porto Alegre, Recife and Santos.
Canada	12 April 1952	See Canada–Portugal relations.: Canada has an embassy in Lisbon.; Portugal has an embassy in Ottawa and consulates-general in Montreal, Toronto and Vancouver.; Both nations are part of NATO.
Chile	28 February 1879	See Chile–Portugal relations: Chile has an embassy in Lisbon.; Portugal has an embassy in Santiago.
Colombia	9 April 1857	Formal relations began in 1857.; Colombia has an embassy in Lisbon.; Portugal has an embassy in Bogotá.
Cuba	1929	Cuba has an embassy in Lisbon.; Portugal has an embassy in Havana.
El Salvador	15 March 1966	El Salvador has an embassy in Lisbon.; Portugal is accredited to El Salvador from its embassy in Mexico City, Mexico.
Mexico	6 December 1879	See Mexico–Portugal relations.: Formal relations between Portugal and Mexico began on 20 October 1864.; Mexico has an embassy in Lisbon.; Portugal has an embassy in Mexico City.; Both countries are full members of the Organization of Ibero-American States.
Panama	21 May 1904	Panama has an embassy in Lisbon.; Portugal has an embassy in Panama City.
Peru	26 March 1853	Main article: Peru–Portugal relations: Peru has an embassy in Lisbon.; Portugal has an embassy in Lima.
United States	13 May 1791	See Portugal–United States relations. Portugal was among the first nations to establish diplomatic ties with the United States. Contributing to the strong ties between the United States and Portugal are the 20,000 Americans living in Portugal and some sizable Portuguese communities in Massachusetts, Rhode Island, New Jersey, California, and Hawaii. The latest census estimates that 1.3 million individuals living in the United States are of Portuguese ancestry, with a large percentage coming from the Portuguese Autonomous region of the Azores.: Portugal has an embassy in Washington, D.C., and consulates-general in Boston, New York, Newark and San Francisco and consulates in New Bedford and Providence.; United States has an embassy in Lisbon.
Uruguay	16 October 1852	See Portugal–Uruguay relations.: Portugal has an embassy in Montevideo.; Uruguay has an embassy in Lisbon.
Venezuela	1914	Portugal has an embassy in Caracas and a consulate-general in Valencia.; Venezuela has an embassy in Lisbon.

=== Asia ===
Country	Formal relations began	Notes
Armenia	25 May 1992	See Armenia–Portugal relations.: Armenia is accredited to Portugal from its embassy in Rome, Italy.; Portugal is accredited to Armenia from its embassy in Moscow, Russia.; Portugal has recognized the Armenian genocide in 2019.
Azerbaijan	4 August 1992	See Azerbaijan-Portugal relations.: Azerbaijan is accredited to Portugal from its embassy in Rabat, Morocco.; Portugal is accredited to Azerbaijan from its embassy in Ankara, Turkey.
Bahrain	10 July 1976	See Bahrain–Portugal relations. Bahrain was ruled by the Portuguese Empire from 1521 until 1602, when they were expelled by Shah Abbas I of the Safavid dynasty.
China	2 February 1979	See China–Portugal relations.: China has an embassy in Lisbon.; Portugal has an embassy in Beijing and consulates-general in Macau and Shanghai.
India	22 June 1949	See India–Portugal relations.: Relations between India and Portugal began amicably in 1947 when the former achieved independence. Relations went into decline after 1950 over Portugal's refusal to surrender its enclaves of Goa, Daman and Diu on India's west coast. By 1955, the two nations had cut off diplomatic relations, triggering a crisis which precipitated in the invasion of Portuguese India in 1961. Portugal refused to recognize Indian sovereignty over the annexed territories until 1974 when, following the Carnation Revolution, the new government in Lisbon recognized Indian sovereignty and restored diplomatic relations.; Relations have turned cordial since then and a number of state visits have been made, treaties have been signed. Indo-Portuguese bilateral trade grew from US$69 million in 1991 to US$289.52 million in 2005.; The Indian state of Goa hosted the 2013 Lusophony Games, the third edition of the multi-sport event for delegations representing every Portuguese-speaking National Olympic Committees.; India has an embassy in Lisbon.; Portugal has an embassy in New Delhi and a consulate-general in Panjim, Goa.
Indonesia	4 January 1965	See Indonesia–Portugal relations. In 1999, Indonesia and Portugal restored diplomatic relations, which were broken off following the Indonesian invasion of East Timor in 1975.: Indonesia has an embassy in Lisbon.; Portugal has an embassy in Jakarta.
Iran	1513	See Portuguese–Safavid relations and Iran–Portugal relations: Iran has an embassy in Lisbon.; Portugal has an embassy in Tehran.
Iraq		Iraq has an embassy in Lisbon.; Portugal is represented in Iraq through embassy in Abu Dhabi (United Arab Emirates).
Israel	12 May 1977	See Israel–Portugal relations The Estado Novo regime did not recognize Israel. Full diplomatic relations with the Israeli government were established in 1977, following the Portuguese revolution of 1974.: Israel has an embassy in Lisbon.; Portugal has an embassy in Tel Aviv.
Japan	3 August 1860	See Japan–Portugal relations.: Japan has an embassy in Lisbon.; Portugal has an embassy in Tokyo.
Kazakhstan	19 August 1992	Kazakhstan has an embassy in Lisbon.; Portugal has an embassy in Astana.
North Korea	22 April 1975	See Portugal–North Korea relations. In 1975, North Korea and Portugal established diplomatic relations. In 2017, Portugal cut diplomatic ties with North Korea.
Pakistan	4 November 1949	Pakistan has an embassy in Lisbon.; Portugal has an embassy in Islamabad.
Philippines	4 July 1946	Philippines has an embassy in Lisbon.; Portugal is accredited to the Philippines from its embassy in Jakarta, Indonesia.
Qatar	1 May 1982	Portugal has an embassy in Doha.; Qatar has an embassy in Lisbon.
Saudi Arabia	18 July 1980	Saudi Arabia has an embassy in Lisbon.; Portugal has an embassy in Riyadh.
South Korea	15 April 1961	See Portugal–South Korea relations Although far apart in geographical terms, the known contacts between Portugal and Korea date from the beginning of the 17th century.: In 1604, a Portuguese merchant, João Mendes, traveled to East Asia via Macao to engage in trading and, after having been taken captive along with other crew in a sea battle with a Japanese foreign trade mission boat, landed in Tongyang, on the Southeastern coast of Korea.; But before that – throughout the 16th century – both Portuguese cartography and texts written by Portuguese Jesuit fathers provide a significant number of references to Korea. Luís de Fróis, in his History of Japan (which includes ten chapters on Korea), Tomé Pires, in his Summa Oriental, Fernão Mendes Pinto, celebrated author of The Peregrination, Fernão Vaz Dourado, Gaspar Vilela, or father Manuel Teixeira, are some of the authors and cartographers where numerous references to Korea can be found.; On the basis of toponyms related to Korea found in texts written and charts drawn by Portuguese travelers and cartographers, Korean historians have attributed to the Portuguese the introduction of Korea to the Western world.; Thus, Portugal and Korea can trace their relations back to the era when Portugal played a pioneering role in opening the sea routes between Europe and Asia, between East and West, setting out the first wave of globalization and fostering multiform contacts and exchanges between different civilizations that became the hallmark of the modern world.; Today, the relations between Portugal and Korea stand on solid grounds, built upon an extensive network of bilateral agreements and political visits at high level, as well as on a growing exchange of people to people contacts. With Asia taking centerpiece place in the world economy and Korea playing a leading role in Asia, trade and relations between both countries are expected to develop further.; On the sidelines of their meeting on 10 April the South Korean Foreign Minister Yun Byung-se and his Portuguese counterpart Rui Machete signed the Memorandum of Understanding between South Korea and Portugal concerning a Working Holiday Program.; The Memorandum of understanding (MOU) was brought into force on 10 April 2014, allowing an annual 200 youngsters aged 18–30 of each country to stay in the other country for up to one year traveling and working.; South Korea is the first country Portugal has concluded such an MOU with The bilateral MOU is expected to offer opportunities to future leaders of the two countries to better understand each other's cultures and promote exchanges and cooperation between the two countries.; Portugal has an embassy in Seoul.; South Korea has an embassy in Lisbon.
Thailand	10 February 1859	See Portugal–Thailand relations: Portugal has an embassy in Bangkok.; Thailand has an embassy in Lisbon.
Timor-Leste	20 May 2002	See Portugal–Timor-Leste relations. East Timor was an overseas territory of Portugal for over 400 years. Portugal was a strong advocate of independence for East Timor, which was occupied annexed by neighboring Indonesia between 1975 and 1999, and has committed troops and money to Timor-Leste, in close cooperation with the United Nations and Timor-Leste's Asian neighbors.: Timor-Leste has an embassy in Lisbon.; Portugal has an embassy in Dili.
Turkey	20 March 1843	See Portugal–Turkey relations Turkey's 161 years of political relations with Portugal date back to the Ottoman period when the Visconde do Seixal was appointed as an envoy to Istanbul. Diplomatic relations ceased during World War I and were re-established in the Republican period in 1926. A resident embassy was established in 1957.: Portugal has an embassy in Ankara.; Turkey has an embassy in Lisbon.; Both countries are full members of NATO.; Portuguese embassy in Ankara; Turkish Ministry of Foreign Affairs about relations with Portugal
United Arab Emirates	20 June 1976	See Portugal–United Arab Emirates relations: Portugal has an embassy in Abu Dhabi.; United Arab Emirates has an embassy in Lisbon.
Vietnam	1 July 1975	Portugal is accredited to Vietnam from its embassy in Bangkok, Thailand. However, Portugal has a consulate-general in Ho Chi Minh City.; Vietnam is accredited to Portugal from its embassy in Paris, France.

=== Europe ===
Country	Formal relations began	Notes
Albania	19 December 1939	See Albania–Portugal relations.: Albania has an embassy in Lisbon.; Portugal has an embassy in Tirana.; Both countries are full members of NATO.; Albania is an EU candidate and Portugal is an EU member.
Andorra	22 December 1994	See Andorra–Portugal relations: Andorra has an embassy in Lisbon.; Portugal is accredited to Andorra from its embassy in Madrid, Spain.
Austria	April 1696	See Austria–Portugal relations: Austria has an embassy in Lisbon.; Portugal has an embassy in Vienna.; Both countries are full members of the European Union and of the Council of Europe.
Belgium	July 1834	See Belgium–Portugal relations: Belgium has an embassy in Lisbon.; Portugal has an embassy in Brussels.; Both countries are full members of the European Union and NATO.
Bulgaria	26 June 1974	See Bulgaria–Portugal relations.: Diplomatic relations were first established in 1925. They were severed in 1945 and were restored on 24 June 1974.; Bulgaria has an embassy in Lisbon.; Portugal has an embassy in Sofia.; Both countries are full members of the European Union and NATO.; In 2007, the two countries signed a police co-operation agreement.
Croatia	3 February 1992	Croatia has an embassy in Lisbon.; Portugal has an embassy in Zagreb.; Both countries are full members of the European Union and NATO.
Cyprus	5 March 1975	Cyprus has an embassy in Lisbon.; Portugal has an embassy in Nicosia.; Both countries are full members of the European Union and of the Council of Europe.
Czech Republic	1921	Czech Republic has an embassy in Lisbon.; Portugal has an embassy in Prague.; Both countries are full members of the European Union and NATO.
Denmark	18 March 1641	See Denmark–Portugal relations.: Denmark has an embassy in Lisbon.; Portugal has an embassy in Copenhagen.; Both countries are full members of the European Union and NATO.
Estonia		Estonia has an embassy in Lisbon.; Portugal is accredited to Estonia from its embassy in Helsinki, Finland.; Both countries are full members of the European Union and NATO.
Finland	10 January 1920	See Finland–Portugal relations: Finland has an embassy in Lisbon.; Portugal has an embassy in Helsinki.; Both countries are full members of the European Union and NATO.; Portugal fully supported Finland's application to join NATO, which resulted in membership on 4 April 2023.
France	1485	See France–Portugal relations Portuguese links to France have remained very strong and the country is considered one of Portugal's main political partners.: France has an embassy in Lisbon.; Portugal has an embassy in Paris and consulates-general in Bordeaux, Lyon, Marseille and Strasbourg and a vice-consulate in Toulouse.; Both countries are full members of the European Union and NATO.
Germany	1871	See Germany–Portugal relations: Germany has an embassy in Lisbon.; Portugal has an embassy in Berlin and has consulates-general in Düsseldorf, Frankfurt, Hamburg and Stuttgart.; Both countries are full members of the European Union and NATO.
Greece	22 July 1835	See Greece–Portugal relations: Greece has an embassy in Lisbon.; Portugal has an embassy in Athens.; Both countries are full members of the European Union and NATO.
Holy See	23 May 1179	See Holy See–Portugal relations: Holy See has an apostolic nunciature in Lisbon.; Portugal has an embassy to the Holy See based in Rome.
Hungary	1 July 1974	Hungary has an embassy in Lisbon.; Portugal has an embassy in Budapest.; Both countries are full members of the European Union and NATO.
Iceland	23 January 1948	Iceland is accredited to Portugal from its embassy in Paris, France.; Portugal is accredited to Iceland from its embassy in Oslo, Norway.; Both countries are full members of NATO.
Ireland	1942	Ireland has an embassy in Lisbon.; Portugal has an embassy in Dublin.; Both countries are full members of the European Union and of the Council of Europe.
Italy	15 July 1872	See Italy–Portugal relations: Italy has an embassy in Lisbon.; Portugal has an embassy in Rome.; Both countries are full members of the European Union and NATO.
Kosovo	14 November 2011	See Kosovo–Portugal relations. Portugal recognized Kosovo on 7 October 2008. Kosovo has formally announced its decision to open an embassy in Lisbon.
Luxembourg		Luxembourg has an embassy in Lisbon.; Portugal has an embassy in Luxembourg.; Both countries are full members of the European Union and NATO.
Malta	22 July 1975	See Malta–Portugal relations.: Malta has an embassy in Lisbon.; Portugal is accredited to Malta from its embassy in Rome, Italy.; Both countries are full members of the European Union and of the Council of Europe.
Netherlands	February 1641	See Netherlands–Portugal relations: Netherlands has an embassy in Lisbon.; Portugal has an embassy in The Hague.; Both nations are members of the European Union, NATO and of the Council of Europe.
North Macedonia		North Macedonia is accredited to Portugal from its embassy in Paris, France.; Portugal is accredited to North Macedonia from its embassy in Belgrade, Serbia.; Both countries are full members of the Council of Europe and NATO.; North Macedonia is an EU candidate and Portugal is an EU member.
Norway	17 March 1906	Norway has an embassy in Lisbon.; Portugal has an embassy in Oslo.; Both countries are full members of NATO.
Poland	13 May 1922	See Poland–Portugal relations: Poland has an embassy in Lisbon.; Portugal has an embassy in Warsaw.; Both countries are full members of the European Union and NATO.
Romania	27 August 1917	See Portugal–Romania relations: Portugal has an embassy in Bucharest.; Romania has an embassy in Lisbon.; Both countries are full members of the European Union and NATO.
Russia	24 October 1779	See Portugal–Russia relations.: Portugal has an embassy in Moscow.; Russia has an embassy in Lisbon.; Both countries are full members of the Council of Europe and the Organization for Security and Co-operation in Europe.
Serbia	14 November 1882	See Portugal–Serbia relations. Portugal established diplomatic relations with the Kingdom of Serbia on 19 October 1917. Relations continued with the successor Kingdom of Yugoslavia. The Portuguese recognized the government in exile of this state after the German occupation of 1941. Relations with the Socialist Federal Republic of Yugoslavia, which took power in 1945 after World War II, were only established in 1974 after the Portuguese Carnation Revolution. Following the dissolution of SFR Yugoslavia during the Yugoslav wars, Portugal maintained relations with the Federal Republic of Yugoslavia, later reconstituted as Serbia and Montenegro and finally as Serbia after Montenegro declared its independence in July 2006. Portugal has an embassy in Belgrade. Serbia has an embassy in Lisbon. In April 1999, Portugal participated in the NATO bombing of Serbia from the Aviano air base in Italy. Portugal also provided troops as part of NATO peacekeeping efforts in the breakaway Serbian province of Kosovo in 1999. In April 1999, Serbia filed a complaint with the International Court of Justice regarding Portugal's use of force in the Federal Republic of Yugoslavia. As of 2007, Portugal still had about 300 troops in Kosovo.: In December 1997, President of Yugoslavia Slobodan Milošević received Portuguese Foreign Minister Jaime Gama to discuss strengthening bilateral relations.; In January 2002, Jaime Gama returned to Yugoslavia in his capacity as Organization for Security and Co-operation in Europe (OSCE) Chairman-in-Office. The OSCE was engaged in stabilizing the situation in southern Serbia following the Kosovo War.; In November 2003, the President of Serbia and Montenegro, Svetozar Marović, visited Portugal. During this visit, he signed an agreement on the succession of Bilateral Agreements between Yugoslavia and Portugal, extending prior agreements on tourism, business, scientific, and technological co-operation, and co-operation in information.; In July 2005, Portuguese Minister of Defense Luís Amado visited Serbia and Montenegro, where he discussed military co-operation with his Serbian counterpart.; In May 2007, Portuguese Foreign Minister Luís Amado gave strong support for Serbian ambitions to join the European Union.; In July 2007, Serbian Prime Minister Vojislav Koštunica visited Lisbon.; In October 2008, Portugal recognized Kosovo's independence from Serbia. (See also Kosovan–Portuguese relations.); In November 2008, Portuguese Foreign Minister Luís Amado met with his Serbian counterpart Vuk Jeremić in Belgrade and voiced his support for removing the suspension of a trade agreement between Serbia and the European Union. Also that month, the Serbian Minister of Science and Technological Development met a Portuguese delegation and discussed cooperation in energy efficiency, nanotechnology, and the food industry, with plans to sign a co-operation agreement on science and technology by the end of 2008.; In February 2009, Serbian Defence Minister Dragan Šutanovac met with his Portuguese counterpart Nuno Severiano Teixeira. They signed an agreement on defense cooperation and discussed Serbia's NATO bid.; In June 2009, Serbian Prime Minister Mirko Cvetković met with Portuguese parliamentary speaker Jaime Gama, and discussed improvements to bilateral cooperation.; In the January–October 2006 period, bilateral trade between Serbia and Portugal were estimated at US$12.7 million.: Portugal has an embassy in Belgrade.; Serbia has an embassy in Lisbon.; Portugal is an EU member and Serbia is an EU candidate.
Spain	5 October 1143	See Portugal–Spain relations. Historically, the two states were long-standing adversaries, but in recent years, they have enjoyed a much friendlier relationship and in 1986, they entered the European Union together.: Portugal has an embassy in Madrid, consulates-general in Barcelona and Seville, and a vice-consulate in Vigo.; Spain has an embassy in Lisbon and a consulate-general in Porto.; Both countries are full members of the European Union and NATO.
Sweden	29 July 1641	See Portugal–Sweden relations: Portugal has an embassy in Stockholm.; Sweden has an embassy in Lisbon.; Both countries are full members of the European Union, NATO and of the Council of Europe.; Portugal fully supported Sweden's application to join NATO, which resulted in membership on 7 March 2024.
Switzerland	5 November 1872	Portugal has an embassy in Bern.; Switzerland has an embassy in Lisbon.
Ukraine	27 January 1992	See Portugal–Ukraine relations.: Portugal recognized Ukraine's independence in 1991.; Portugal has an embassy in Kyiv.; Ukraine has an embassy in Lisbon and a consulate in Porto.; Both countries are full members of the Organization for Security and Co-operation in Europe and of the Council of Europe.; Portugal is an EU member and Ukraine is an EU candidate.; As of 2015, according to United Nations statistics, there are 45,051 Ukrainians living in Portugal.
United Kingdom	9 May 1386	See Portugal–United Kingdom relations. British Prime Minister Boris Johnson with Portuguese Prime Minister António Costa in 10 Downing Street, June 2022. Portugal established diplomatic relations with the United Kingdom on 9 May 1386.: Portugal maintains an embassy and a consulate general in London, and consulates in Belfast, Edinburgh, Hamilton and St Helier.; The United Kingdom is accredited to Portugal through its embassy in Lisbon, and a vice consulate in Portimão.; Both countries share common membership of the Atlantic Co-operation Pact, the Council of Europe, NATO, the OECD, the OSCE, the United Nations, the World Health Organization, and the World Trade Organization. Bilaterally the two countries have the Anglo-Portuguese Alliance, and a Double Taxation Convention.

=== Oceania ===
Country	Formal relations began	Notes
Australia	4 August 1960	Australia has an embassy in Lisbon.; Portugal has an embassy in Canberra and a consulate-general in Sydney.
New Zealand	22 June 1976	New Zealand is accredited to Portugal from its embassy in Paris, France.; Portugal is accredited to New Zealand from its embassy in Canberra, Australia.

== See also ==
- List of diplomatic missions in Portugal
- List of diplomatic missions of Portugal
