= Portugal–South Africa relations =

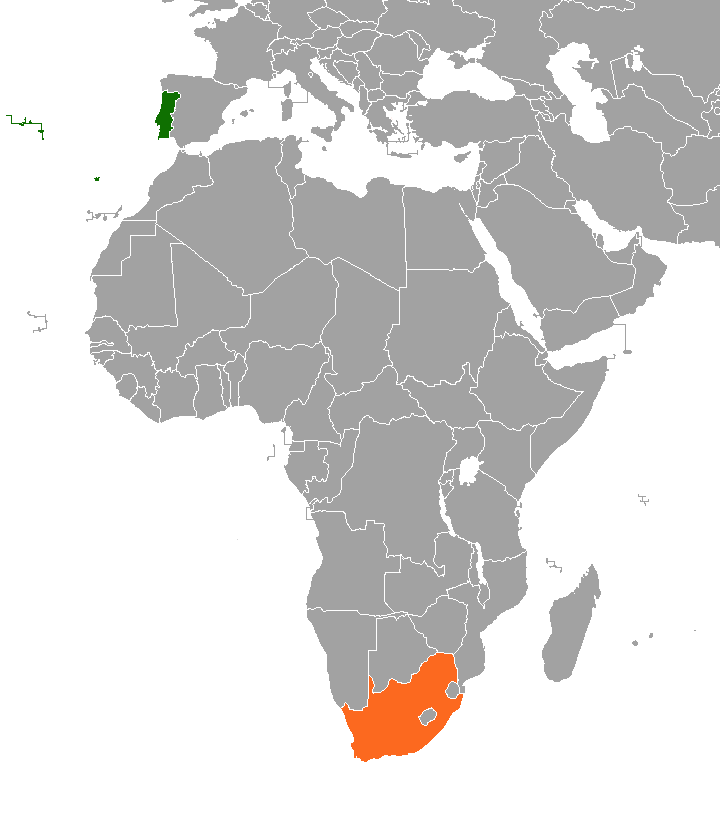
- Portugal: South Africa

Portugal–South Africa relations refer to the current and historical relationship between Portugal and South Africa. Nowadays the two countries have solid relations, with South Africa representing a major partner for Portugal amongst AU members.

South Africa has an Embassy in Lisbon. Portugal has an Embassy in Pretoria. In addition, there are Consulates-General in Johannesburg and Cape Town.

== History ==
=== Exploration ===
Early explorers had set out with one purpose in mind, which was to discover a new sea route to the Orient. It is unlikely that they had any idea of achieving anything more than discovering and opening new channels of trade and commerce for Portugal. Furthermore, they were probably discouraged from any attempt to penetrate the interior of the country or to form settlements along the coast by the inhospitable terrain and by the hostile and warlike disposition of the native inhabitants. One of the biggest clashes between Portuguese and South African natives occurred in 1510; Francisco de Almeida, first viceroy of the Portuguese possessions in the East, was assassinated along with sixty-four of his men on the shores of Table Bay following a dispute with the Khoikhoi near Treaty Tree.

The Portuguese explored the coasts of South Africa from the late 15th century, and nominally claimed them as their own with the erecting of padrões (large stone cross inscribed with the coat of arms of Portugal placed there as part of a land claim). Bartolomeu Dias did so in 1486, erecting the first Western-style monument in today's South Africa.

In 1497, Vasco da Gama, en route to India, recorded a sighting of the Cape of Good Hope(Cabo da Boa Esperança) because of the optimism the Portuguese crown stored on the new trade route.

=== Apartheid ===
South Africa had close relations with Portugal, particularly during the time that Mozambique and Angola were Portuguese colonies. South Africa under Apartheid was ruled by the National Party, which shared common ground with the anti-communist Estado Novo regime of António de Oliveira Salazar in Portugal.

Following Britain's decision to grant independence to its colonies in Africa, the government of Hendrik Verwoerd feared that the newly independent states would fall under the influence of the Soviet Union, and from 1961 onwards, there were frequent meetings of South African and Portuguese intelligence operatives as well as visits of South African politicians to Portuguese-ruled Angola and Mozambique. It was in this scenario that the Alcora Exercise (acronym for "Aliança Contra as Rebeliões em Africa" or "Alliance against the rebellions in Africa"), a pact between Rhodesia, Portugal and South Africa, was established in 1970. Following the Carnation Revolution, in 1974, the alliance was dismantled.

=== Portuguese heritage in South Africa ===
The Portuguese have left many vestiges dating back to the Age of Discovery.

In Mossel Bay (named by Dias "Angra dos Vaqueiros" or Herder's bay) there is a Museum dedicated to Bartolomeu Dias (Bartolomeu Dias Museum Complex),. The museum was erected where the famous Post Office Tree, used by the Portuguese to exchange messages, stands. Moreover, it is in this very city that, a few years after Dias' expedition, the first Christian shrine in South Africa was built by João da Nova's crew.

It is noteworthy that there are still many toponyms of Portuguese origin in South Africa, such as Algoa Bay (from Bahia de Lagoa or "Bay of the Lagoon"), St Croix Island (from Ilha da Santa Cruz or "Saint Cross Island"), Cape Agulhas (from Cabo das Agulhas or "Cape of Needles" – the southern tip of continental Africa) and, Cape Voltas (or "Turning Cape"), Cape Recife (Cabo de Recife or "Cape of the reefs"), Infanta (named after João Infante), Machadodorp, and Saldanha (named after António de Saldanha, captain of a vessel in Albuquerque's fleet which visited South Africa in 1503).

Portuguese visits to Saldanha areas predates Van Riebeeck's official arrival in the Cape of good hope 1652.

Some of those Portuguese men in the 1500s stayed over in Saldanha and Paternoster and inter married with Khoi Khoi women, which makes the Portuguese-Khoi Khoi offspring the first official mixed race in Southern Tip of Africa.

In addition, KwaZulu-Natal province – the second most populated of the country – still retains the Portuguese origin of its name, being where Gama, travelling to India, landed on Christmas, 1497.

Due to the extensive travels of Portuguese explorers in the 15th-16th centuries, the South African coast and its valuable historical heritage is considered one of the richest places in the world for studying the travels of the Portuguese in the early Age of Discovery.

== Immigration ==
Portuguese in South Africa

The early 20th century witnessed a trickle of emigrants from Madeira whose numbers greatly increased in the decades following World War II. Madeiran immigrants, who are traditionally associated with horticulture and commerce, form the largest group within South Africa's Portuguese community.

The largest influx of Portuguese in South Africa occurred when Angola and Mozambique became independent in 1975. While most Portuguese from the two former colonies either settled in Portugal or Brazil, some of them were allowed to enter South Africa. Despite the number of Portuguese nationals having registered their residence in South Africa within the Portuguese authorities stands at 108,254 in 2021, some estimates put that number as high as 450,000. The discrepancy in numbers is due to the fact of not being mandatory, for Portuguese citizens, to register with Portuguese consulates abroad.

On the other hand, South African authorities estimate that up to 700,000 people (including descendants) living in South Africa are of Portuguese ancestry.

South Africans in Portugal

There has also been a growing number of South Africans buying property in Portugal order to gain residence and retire there and be able to travel within the Schengen area. As of 2021, according to the Portuguese National Census, there were 12,499 South African born people residing in Portugal.

== Economy ==
With a bilateral trade valued at 400 Million euros as of 2021, Portugal is a relevant trade partner for South Africa in Europe.

Moreover, the two countries have signed a convention for the avoidance of double taxation in 2008.

== Air links ==
There have been no direct flights between the two countries since TAP Portugal ended services between Lisbon and Johannesburg in 2011. South African Airways, (SAA now no longer exists) which has also discontinued flights between the two countries, used to fly to Rome, Athens and Tel Aviv via Lisbon, as it was banned from entering the airspace of African countries opposed to its apartheid policies.

Both airlines are now members of Star Alliance, and operate code share flights.

== Resident diplomatic missions ==
- Portugal has an embassy in Pretoria and consulates-general in Cape Town and Johannesburg.
- South Africa has an embassy in Lisbon.

== See also ==
- Foreign relations of Portugal
- Foreign relations of South Africa
- Portuguese South African
