= Italy–Portugal relations =

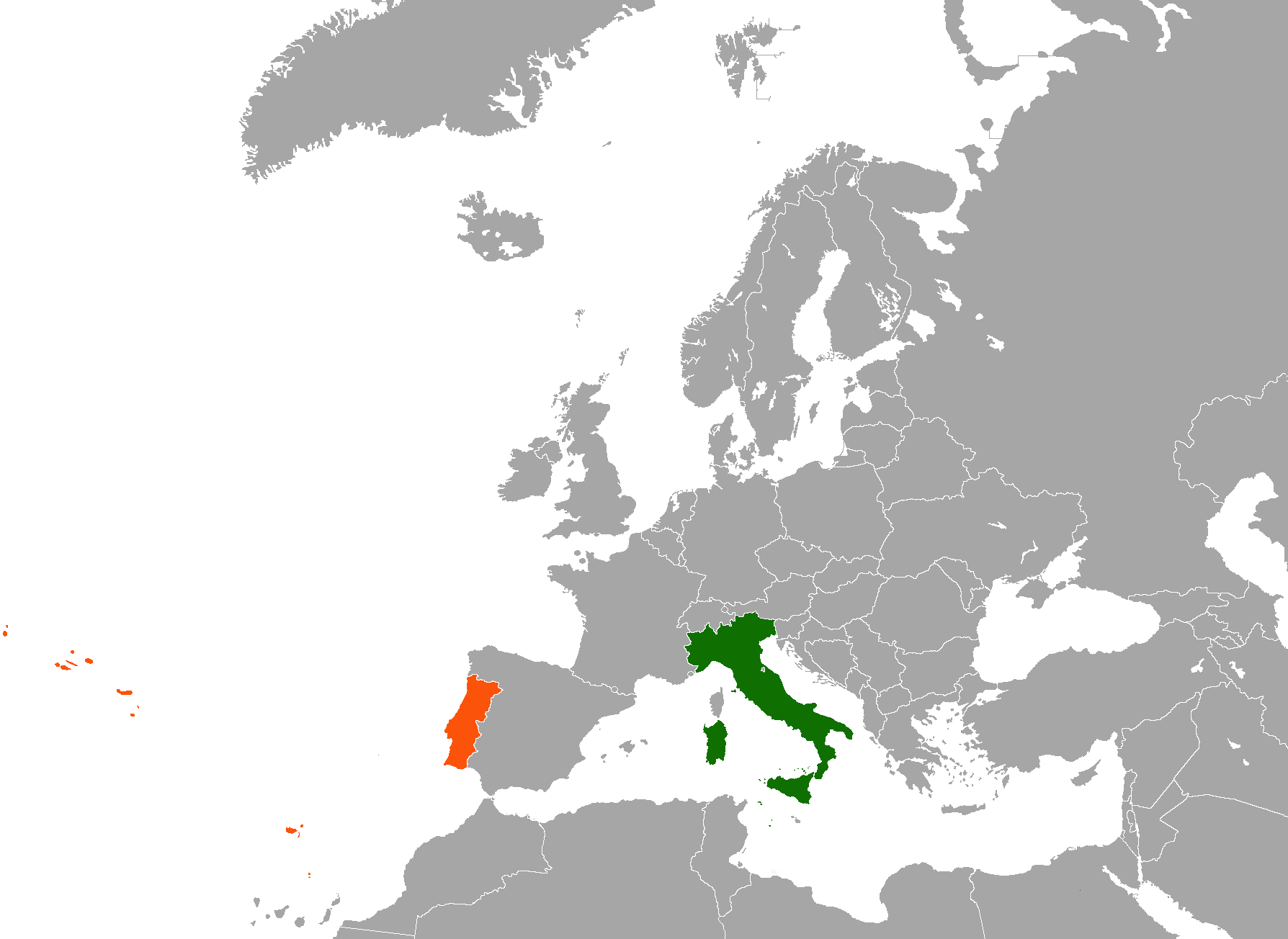
- Italy: Portugal

Italy–Portugal relations (Italian: Relazioni Italia-Portogallo; Portuguese: Relações Itália-Portugal) are the current and historical relations between Italy and Portugal. Both nations are members of the Council of Europe, European Union, NATO, Organisation for Economic Co-operation and Development, Union for the Mediterranean and the United Nations.

== History ==
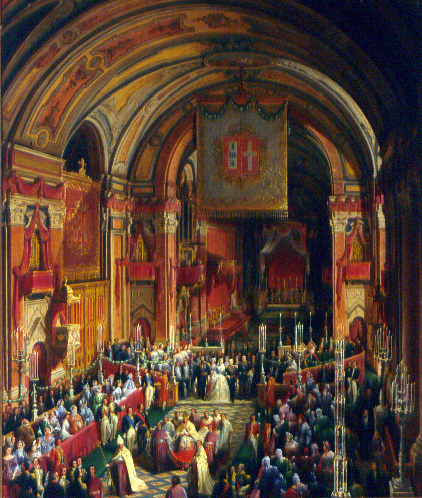
Wedding between King Luís I of Portugal and Maria Pia of Savoy in Lisbon; 1862.

Italy and Portugal have a long history of relations given the proximity between both nations. Under the Iberian Union from 1580 to 1640, Portugal and the Kingdom of Naples, Kingdom of Sicily, and the Duchy of Milan were all administered by Madrid, Spain. Between 1680 and 1682, there was direct trade between Portugal and the Duchy of Savoy.

Until 1860, Portugal maintained diplomatic representations to the Kingdom of Sardinia and to the Kingdom of the Two Sicilies. In April 1850, the Portuguese Ambassador residing in Rome accredited to the Holy See, was also accredited to the Grand Duchy of Tuscany. In 1860, Italy and Portugal established formal diplomatic relations. In September 1861, Portugal recognized King Victor Emmanuel III of the united Kingdom of Italy.

In September 1911, Italy recognized the First Portuguese Republic and in May 1918, Italy recognized the government of Portuguese President Sidónio Pais. In 1946, the last Italian King, Umberto II of Italy, fled to Portugal where he remained for 37 years.

During World War I, Portugal remained neutral, however, in 1916 it became an associated member to the allied forces (which included Italy). During World War II, Portugal remained neutral throughout the war.

Political relations between Italy and Portugal remain close. Both nations are members of the European Union and work closely together on numerous issues.

== Bilateral agreements ==
Both nations have signed a few bilateral agreements such as a Treaty for Trade and Navigation (1872); Agreement for Cultural and Scientific Cooperation (1977); Agreement to Avoid Double Taxation and Prevent Tax Evasion in the Field of Income Taxes (1980); Security Agreement (2007); and an Agreement on Mutual Protection of Classified Information (2007).

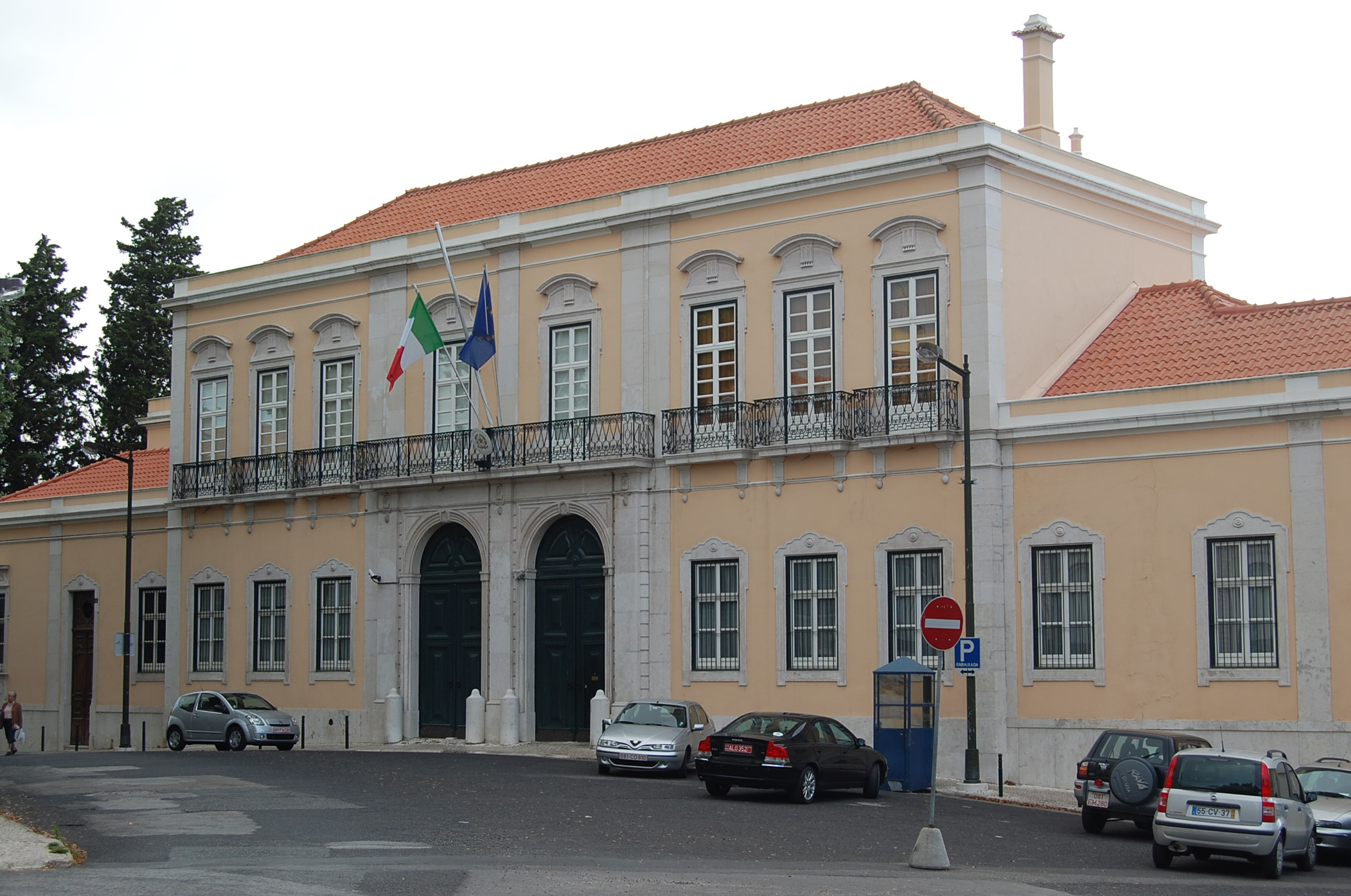
Embassy of Italy in Lisbon

== Resident diplomatic missions ==
- Italy has an embassy in Lisbon.
- Portugal has an embassy in Rome.

== See also ==
- Foreign relations of Italy
- Foreign relations of Portugal
