= Israel–Portugal relations =

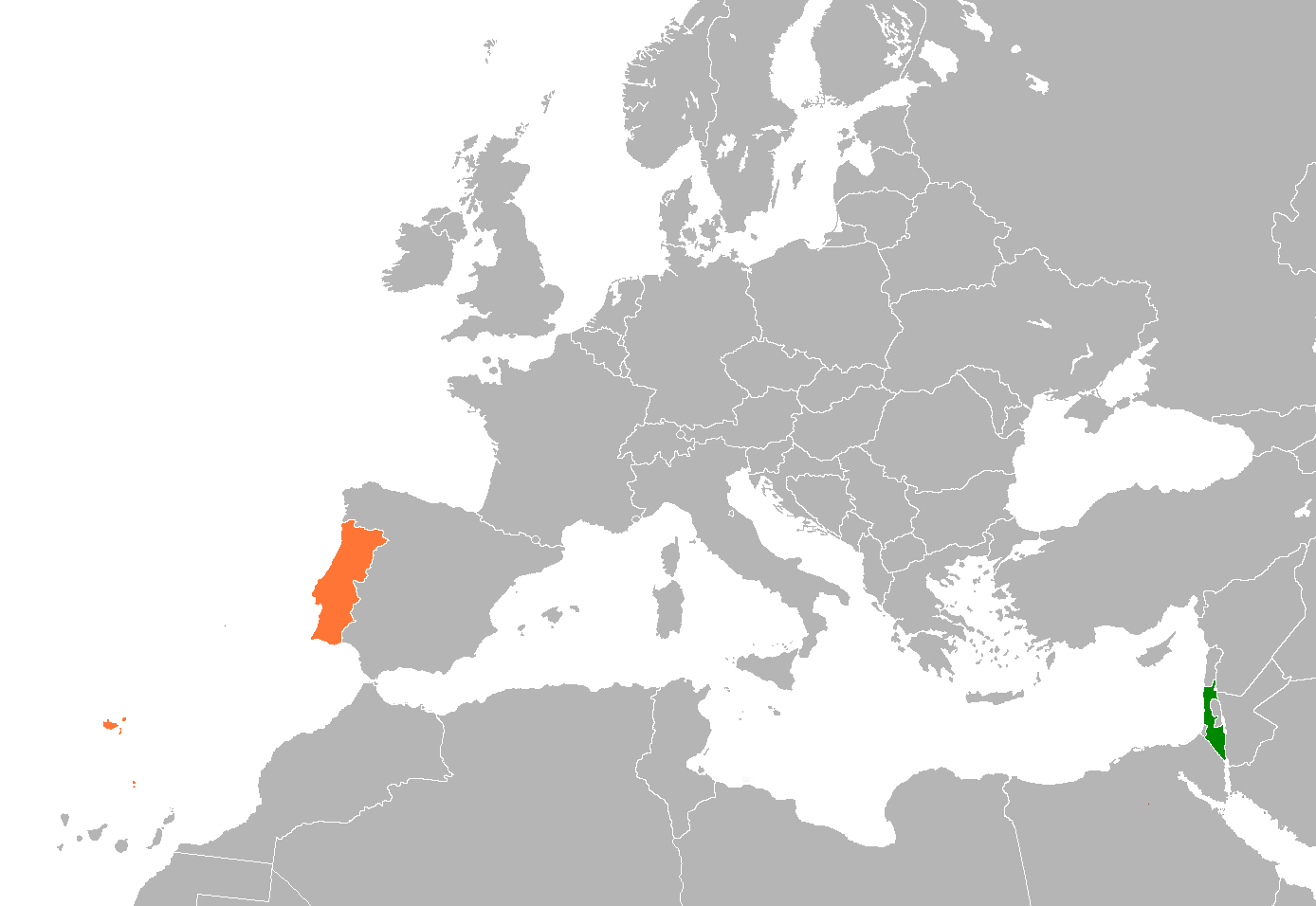
- Israel: Portugal

Israel–Portugal relations are the foreign relations between Israel and Portugal. Israel has an embassy in Lisbon and a consulate in Porto, while Portugal has an embassy in Tel Aviv and a consulate in Haifa.

== History ==
Israel and Portugal established full diplomatic relations on 12 May 1977, while Israel already had a diplomatic mission in Lisbon in the Consulate-General level which was later upgraded to embassy level. The Estado Novo did not recognize Israel, and only after the Portuguese revolution of 1974 did Portugal recognize Israel and establish a relationship. Since 1991, Portugal has had an embassy in Tel Aviv.

Even without relationship, Portugal allowed the United States of America airplanes to stop in the Azores Islands on the way to Israel as part of Operation Nickel Grass to deliver weapons and supplies to Israel during the Yom Kippur War in 1973.

Since 1994 both Israeli and Portuguese nationals do not need visas to visit each other.

On 25 September 2006, Israel and Portugal signed an Avidness double taxation agreement which entered into force on 31 December 2007.

In February 2025, Portuguese foreign minister Paulo Rangel visited Israel and reiterated Portugal's condemnation of Hamas's October 7 attacks against Israel, while voicing criticism of the "disproportionate" Israeli response during the Gaza war.

On 21 September 2025, Portugal officially recognised the state of Palestine, alongside Australia, Canada and the United Kingdom.

== Trade ==
Israel and Portugal trade is also influenced by the EU–Israel Free Trade Agreement of 1995.

Israel–Portugal trade in millions USD-$
	Israel imports Portugal exports	Portugal imports Israel exports	Total trade value
2023	338.9	135	473.9
2022	485	111.8	596.8
2021	405.8	79.3	485.1
2020	297.4	77	374.4
2019	247.6	98	345.6
2018	231.3	148.5	379.8
2017	210.8	107.9	318.7
2016	152.8	106.9	259.7
2015	113.6	113.2	226.8
2014	106.2	141.4	247.6
2013	120.7	122.5	243.2
2012	128.8	145.4	274.2
2011	147	126.7	273.7
2010	95	104.1	199.1
2009	100.1	111.3	211.4
2008	114.2	98.9	213.1
2007	126.2	90.9	217.1
2006	87.2	88.7	175.9
2005	77.9	73.3	151.2
2004	70.1	76.1	146.2
2003	66.4	49.5	115.9
2002	69.8	43.5	113.3

== Resident diplomatic missions ==
- Israel has an embassy in Lisbon and a consulate in Porto.
- Portugal has an embassy in Tel Aviv and a consulate in Haifa.

== See also ==
- Foreign relations of Israel
- Foreign relations of Portugal
- History of the Jews in Portugal
- Spanish and Portuguese Jews
- Judaeo-Portuguese
