= North Korea–Portugal relations =

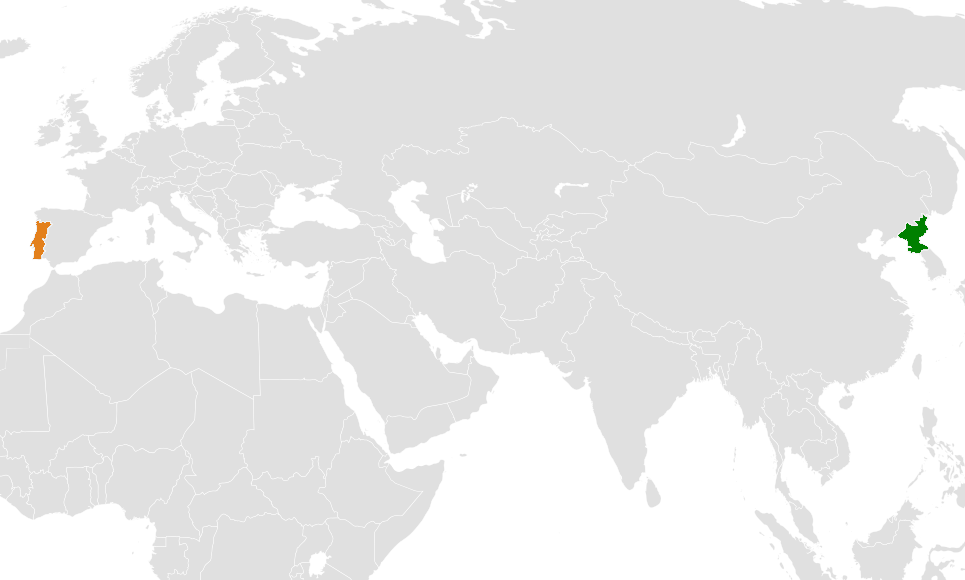

- North Korea: Portugal

North Korea and Portugal established diplomatic relations in 1975. When it was a Portuguese colony, Macau was an important focus of relations between the two countries and a base for the North Korean government's covert activities. Portugal unilaterally ended its diplomatic relations with North Korea in 2017, amid international pressure on North Korea to halt its nuclear and missile programs.

== History ==
In February 1975, diplomatic relations were officially established between North Korea and Portugal. However, North Korea had unofficial relations with Portuguese organisations in Portuguese Macau before then. Following the signing of the Korean Armistice Agreement which ended the Korean War (1950–1953), Macau became a semi-official gateway for North Korea's diplomatic and financial interests. A Macau-based trading company served as North Korea's de facto consulate in the colony.

North Korea took advantage of Macau's reputation as a neutral, laxly regulated area, due to Portugal's political neutrality and the People Republic of China's (PRC) influence in the colony, in contrast to neighbouring Hong Kong. North Korea trained some of its agents in Macau during the colonial period. Kim Hyon-hui, who was responsible for the 1987 Korean Air Flight 858 bombing that killed 115 people, lived in Macau for six months, learning Cantonese and how to impersonate a Chinese national.

In 1999, Macau was handed over to the PRC, increasing its importance to North Korea, which had a more amicable relationship with the PRC than with Portugal.

During his tenure as North Korea's foreign minister and presidium president, Kim Yong-nam made a number of statements affirming the good relationship between the two countries. For example, he gave condolences to then Portuguese president Jorge Sampaio when Francisco da Costa Gomes died in 2001, and sent a friendly greeting to president Aníbal Cavaco Silva on Portugal Day 2008.

In 2017, Portugal unilaterally cut its diplomatic ties with North Korea amid heightened international efforts to have North Korea halt its nuclear and missile programs.

== See also ==
- Foreign relations of North Korea
- Foreign relations of Portugal
