= Portugal–United Arab Emirates relations =

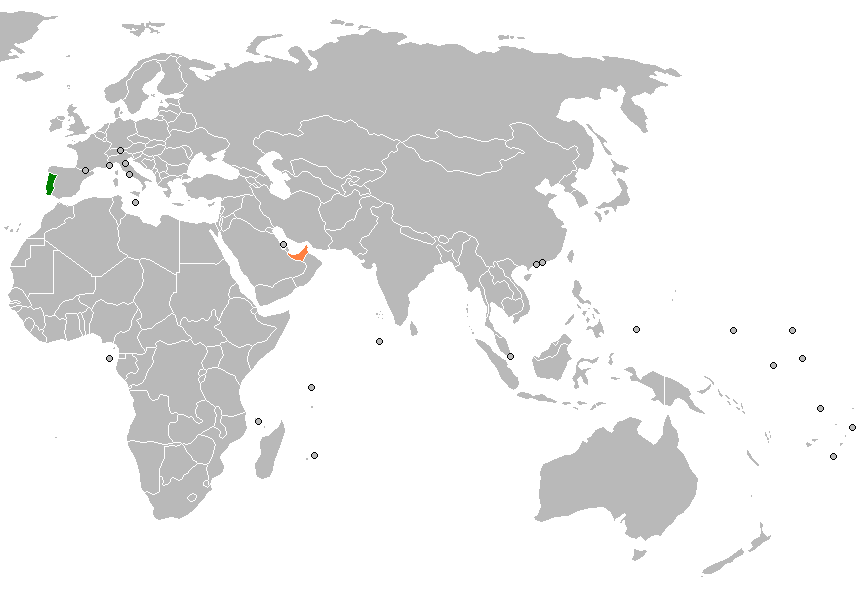

- Portugal: United Arab Emirates

Portugal–United Arab Emirates relations are the bilateral relations between Portugal and the United Arab Emirates (UAE). Relations between the two date back prior to the formation of the UAE as Portugal once occupied many coastal settlements within the northern emirates.

== History ==
During the 16th century, the Portuguese captured many settlements along the Northern emirates including Julfar (now present day, Ras Al Khaimah), Al Badiyah, Khor Fakkan, Kalba and Dibba Al-Hisn as part of the expansion of its empire. It's widely believed that during their reign, the Portuguese had built a fort in Dibba Al Hisn and Al Badiyah. As the Portuguese empire declined, it eventually lost control over these settlements. Relations between the two were reestablished during the 70s as the UAE gained independence from the United Kingdom and Portugal entered its third republic.

== High-level visits ==
High-level visits from the United Arab Emirates to Portugal

- Finance Minister Sultan Al Mansoori (2007)
- Foreign Minister Abdullah Al Nahyan (2009, 2011, 2012)

High-level visits from Portugal to the United Arab Emirates

- Foreign Minister Luís Amado (2009)
- Prime Minister José Sócrates (2011)
- President Aníbal Cavaco Silva (2014)

== Economic ==
AICEP has an office in Abu Dhabi. Trade between the two countries has grown within the past decade, in 2020 trade between the two has reached over 349 million US dollars. Portugal's main exports to the UAE are telecommunications equipment's, minerals and wood. The UAE's main exports to Portugal are polyethylene, textiles and machinery equipment's.

== Resident diplomatic missions ==
- Portugal has an embassy in Abu Dhabi.
- United Arab Emirates has an embassy in Lisbon.

== See also ==
- Foreign relations of Portugal
- Foreign relations of the United Arab Emirates
