= Portugal–Turkey relations =

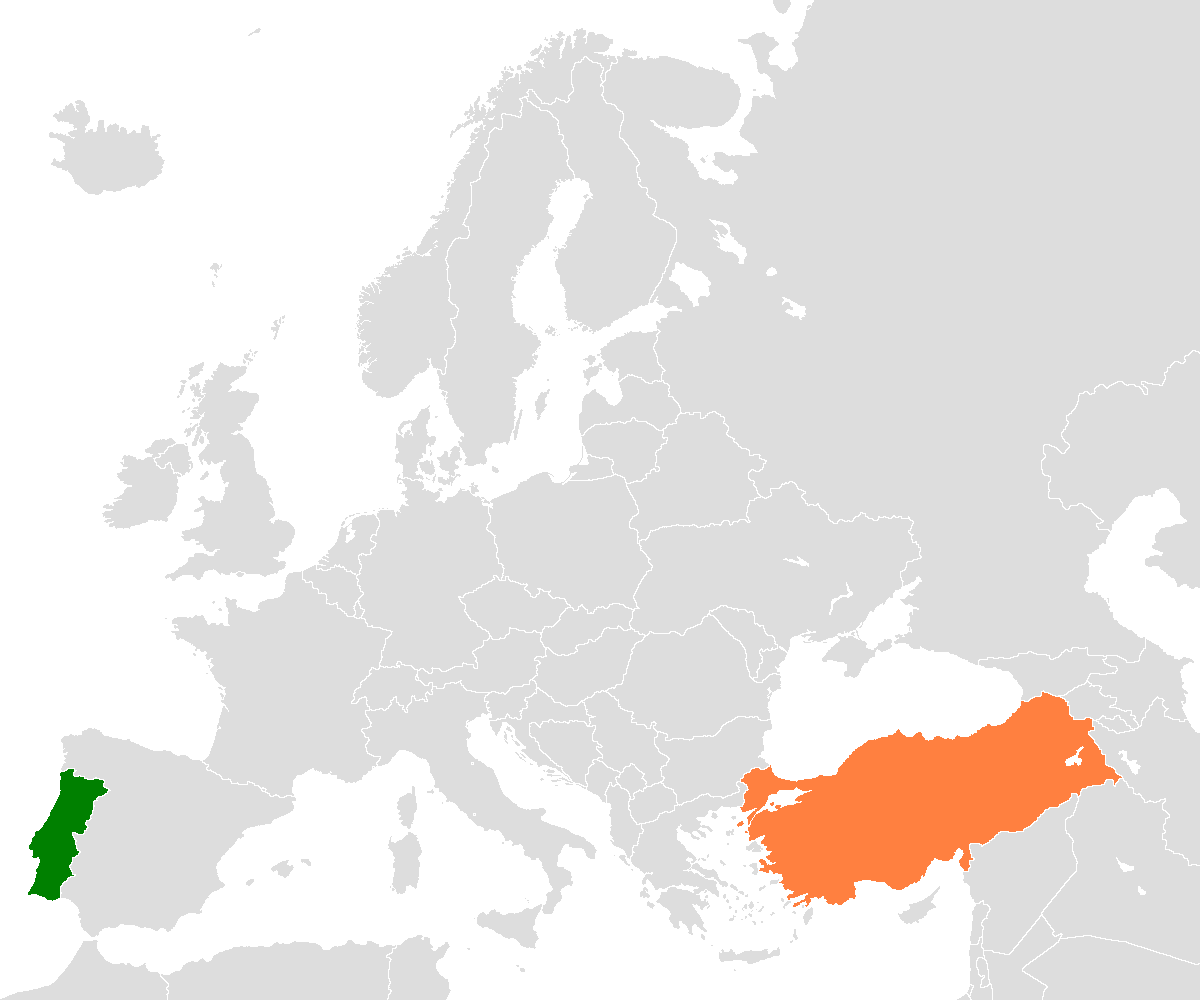
- Portugal: Turkey

Diplomatic mission
- Embassy of Portugal, Ankara: Embassy of Turkey, Lisbon

Portugal–Turkey relations are foreign relations between Portugal and Turkey. Portugal has an embassy in Ankara. Turkey has an embassy in Lisbon. Both countries are full members of the Council of Europe and of NATO. Also Portugal is an EU member and Turkey is an EU candidate.

== History ==
Political relations between Turkey and Portugal date back to 1843. Diplomatic relations were temporarily discontinued during World War 1, but were officially resumed on 28 May 1926. Turkey appointed an ambassador to Portugal in 1931, and Portugal appointed an ambassador to Turkey in 1941.

== Resident diplomatic missions ==
- Portugal has an embassy in Ankara.
- Turkey has an embassy in Lisbon.

== See also ==
- Foreign relations of Portugal
- Foreign relations of Turkey
- Turkey-EU relations
  - Accession of Turkey to the EU
- NATO-EU relations
- Turks in Europe
