= Bulgaria–Portugal relations =

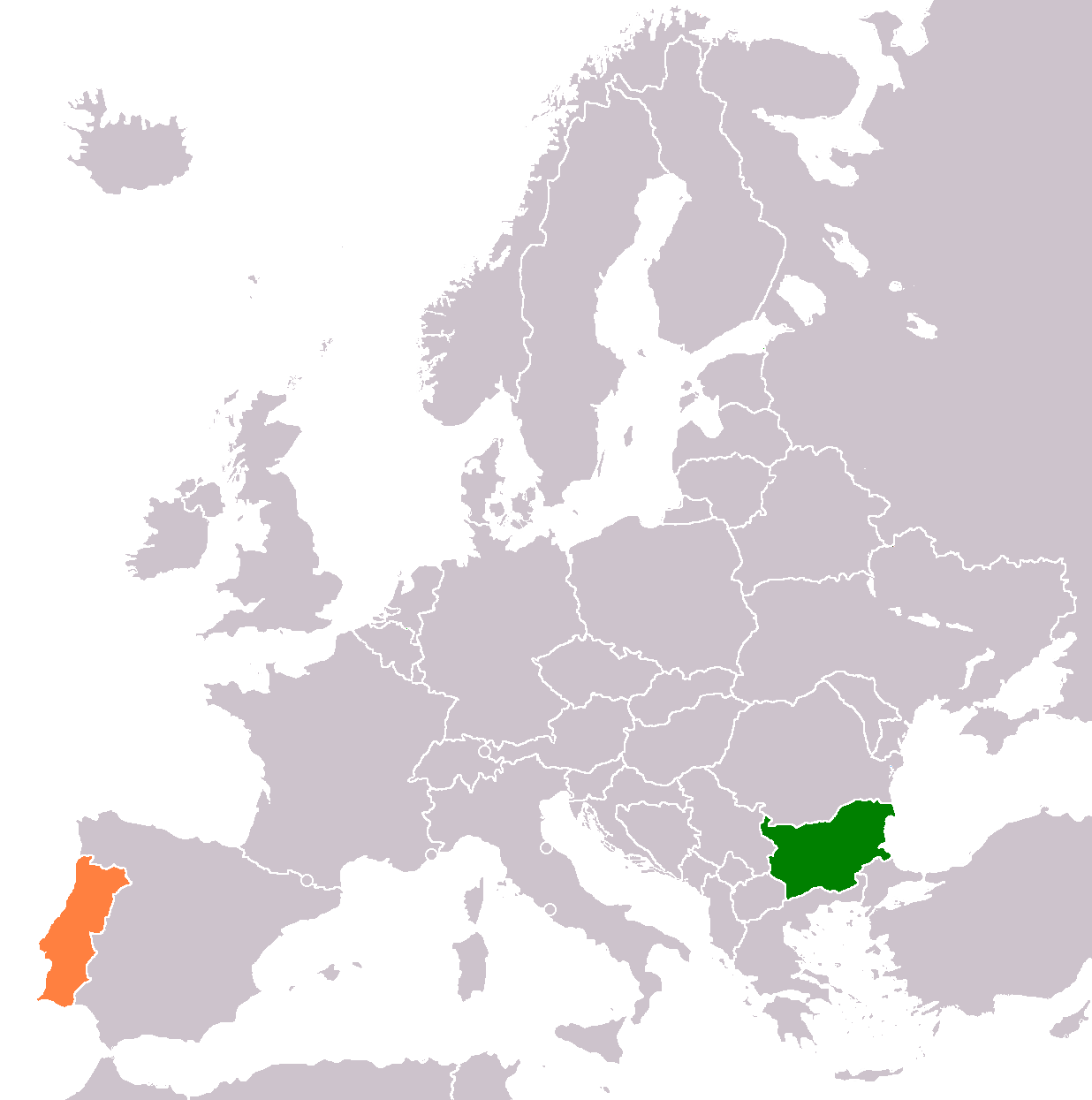

- Bulgaria: Portugal

Bulgaria–Portugal relations are foreign relations between Bulgaria and Portugal. Diplomatic relations between both countries were established in 1925. They were severed in 1945 and were restored on 24 June 1974. Bulgaria has an embassy and an honorary consulate in Lisbon. Portugal has an embassy in Sofia. Both countries are full members of the Council of Europe, European Union and NATO. Portugal has given full support to Bulgaria's membership in the European Union and NATO.

== State visits ==
In 2003, Bulgarian Prime Minister Simeon Saxe-Coburg-Gotha visited Portugal and said "It would be useful to tap Portugal's experience in economic development after its European Union accession".

In December 2004, Bulgarian President Georgi Parvanov visited Portugal.

== Agreements ==
In 2007, the two countries signed a police cooperation agreement.

== International organizations ==
Portugal became a member of the EU in 1986, whereas Bulgaria became a member in 2007. While Portugal is one of the founding members of NATO, Bulgaria became a member in 2004.

== Resident diplomatic missions ==
- Bulgaria has an embassy in Lisbon.
- Portugal has an embassy in Sofia.
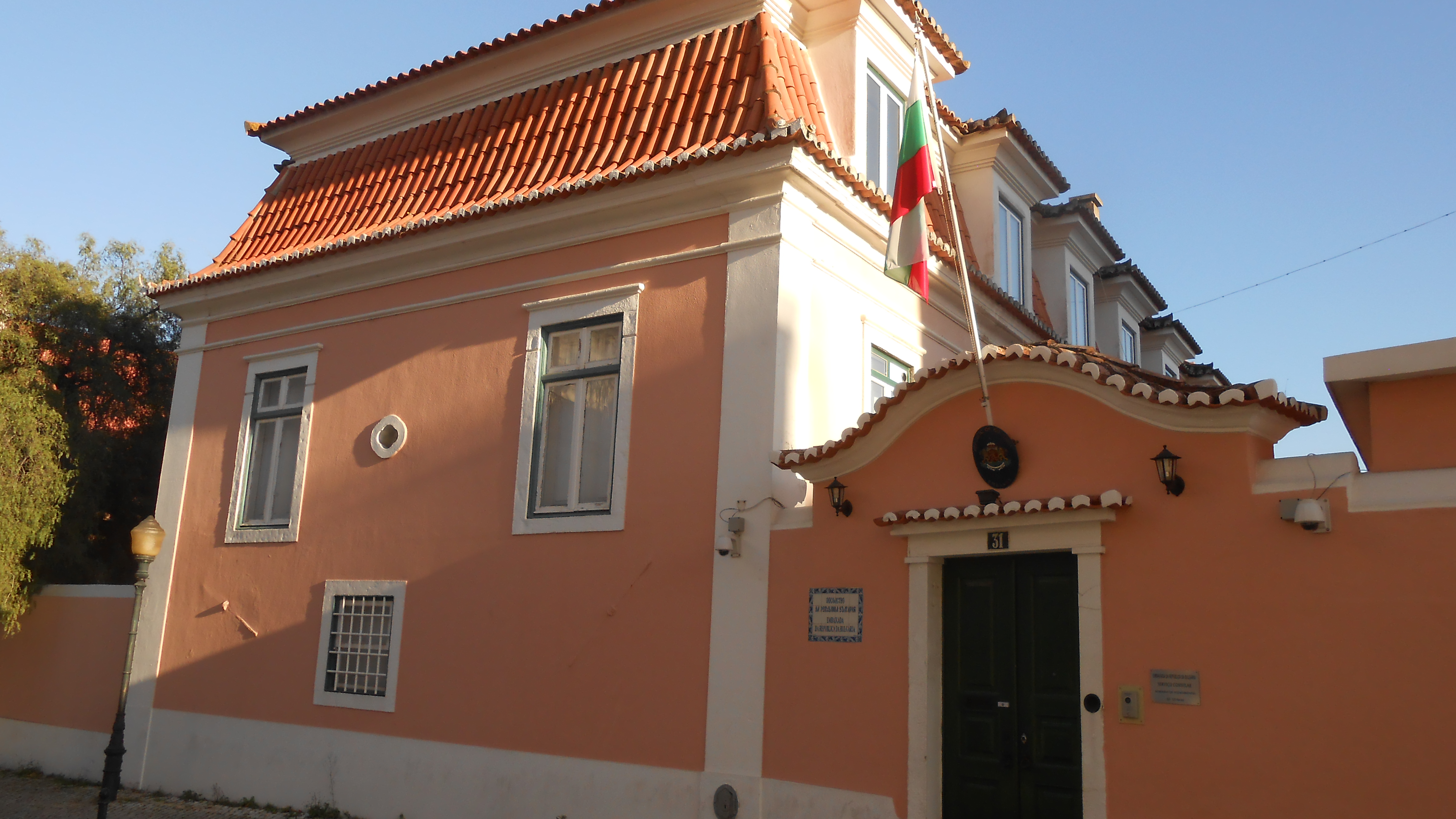
Embassy of Bulgaria in Lisbon

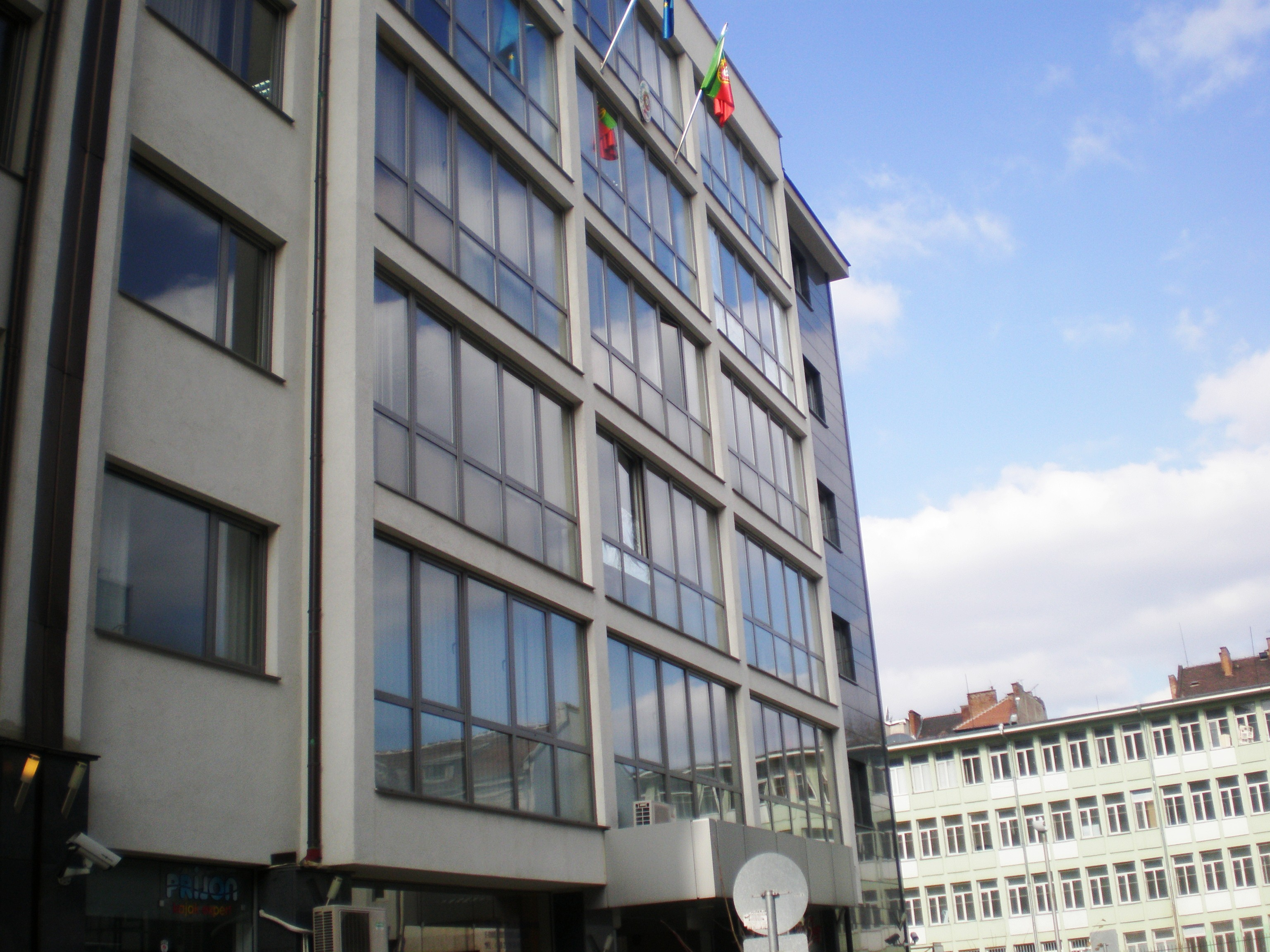
Embassy of Portugal in Sofia

== See also ==
- Foreign relations of Bulgaria
- Foreign relations of Portugal
