= Poland–Portugal relations =

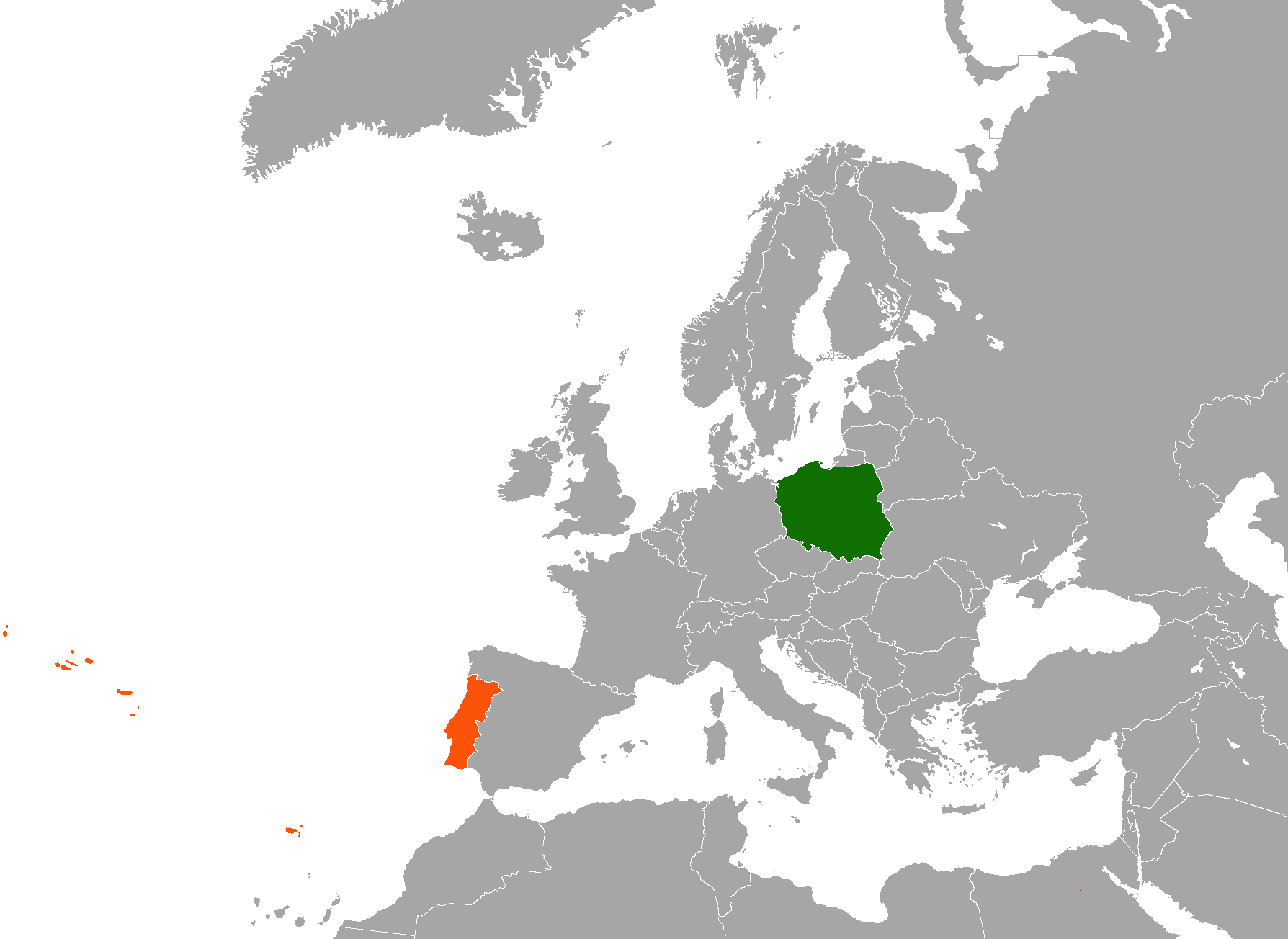
- Poland: Portugal

Poland–Portugal relations are the bilateral relations between the Republic of Poland and the Portuguese Republic. Both nations are members of the Council of Europe, European Union, NATO and the United Nations.

== History ==
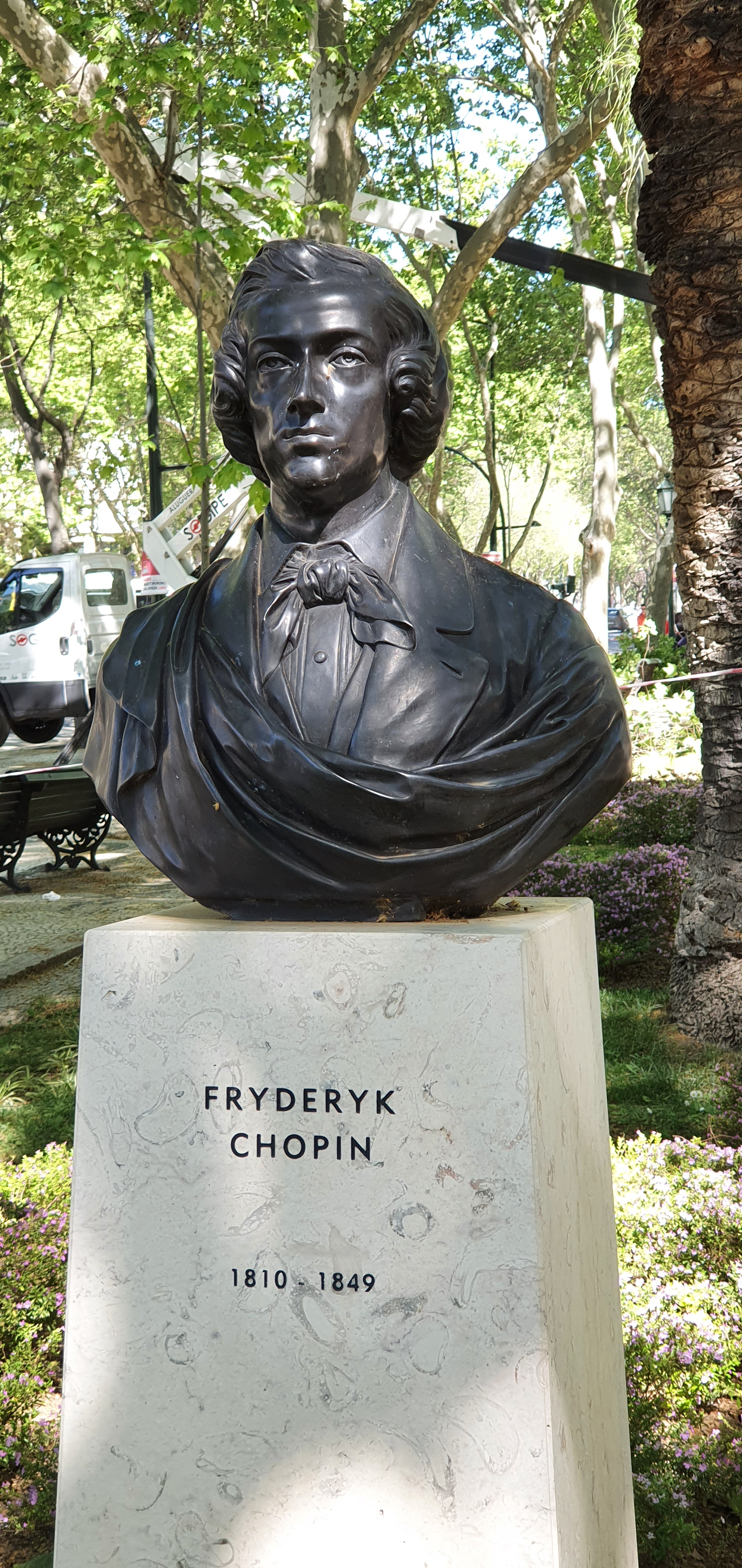
Bust of Polish virtuoso composer Fryderyk Chopin in Lisbon

Trade between Poland and Portugal was established several centuries ago and was conducted by sea through the main port cities of Gdańsk and Lisbon. The Portuguese imported mainly wood, flour and dried fish from Poland, while the Poles imported mainly salt from Portugal, as well as olive oil, figs, raisins, oranges, pomegranates, chestnuts, wine, and expensive furs.

Infante Manuel, Count of Ourém was a candidate in the 1733 Polish–Lithuanian royal election.

During World War I, Poles from the Russian Partition of Poland conscripted to the Russian Army and the Portuguese were among Allied prisoners of war held by the Germans in a POW camp in Stargard in modern northwestern Poland. There are graves of two Portuguese prisoners of war who died in the camp at the war cemetery in Stargard.

On 21 June 1919, the Portuguese government recognized the independence of Poland. In May 1922, diplomatic relations were formally established between both nations. In July 1923, Portugal opened a resident embassy in Warsaw.

In 1945, soon after World War II, Portugal broke diplomatic relations with the newly independent Poland as Portugal did not withdraw its recognition of the Polish government-in-exile in London. As a result, relations between both nations remained cold. The Polish People's Republic criticized the regime of António de Oliveira Salazar in Portugal and did not admit the possibility of establishing diplomatic relations with Lisbon. The Portuguese authorities showed the same attitude towards Poland, while Portuguese politicians were equally critical of the communist regime in Warsaw. However, the Carnation Revolution and political transformations in Portugal made it possible for the establishment of diplomatic relations.

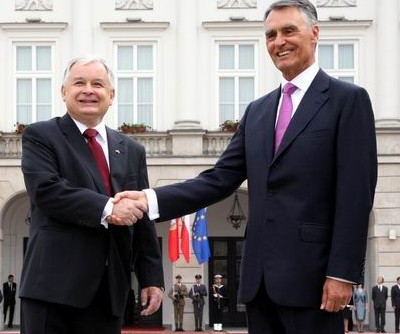
Polish President Lech Kaczyński welcoming Portuguese President Aníbal Cavaco Silva in Warsaw; 2008.

On 11 July 1974, both nations re-established diplomatic relations. In December 1974, Poland established a resident embassy in Lisbon. In January 1975, Portugal opened a resident embassy in Warsaw.

Both nations work closely together as mutual members of the European Union. There have also been several high-level visits between leaders of both nations. Polish President Lech Kaczyński visited Portugal in 2007, and Portuguese President Aníbal Cavaco Silva paid a visit to Poland in 2008.

== Bilateral agreements ==
Both nations have signed several bilateral agreements such as an Agreement on the development of trade, navigation and economic, industrial and technical cooperation (1975); Agreement on cultural and scientific cooperation (1975); Agreement on air transportation (1975); Agreement for scientific and technological cooperation (2005); and an Agreement for the mutual recognition of academic diplomas issued by both nations universities (2015).

== Resident diplomatic missions ==
- Poland has an embassy in Lisbon.
- Portugal has an embassy in Warsaw.
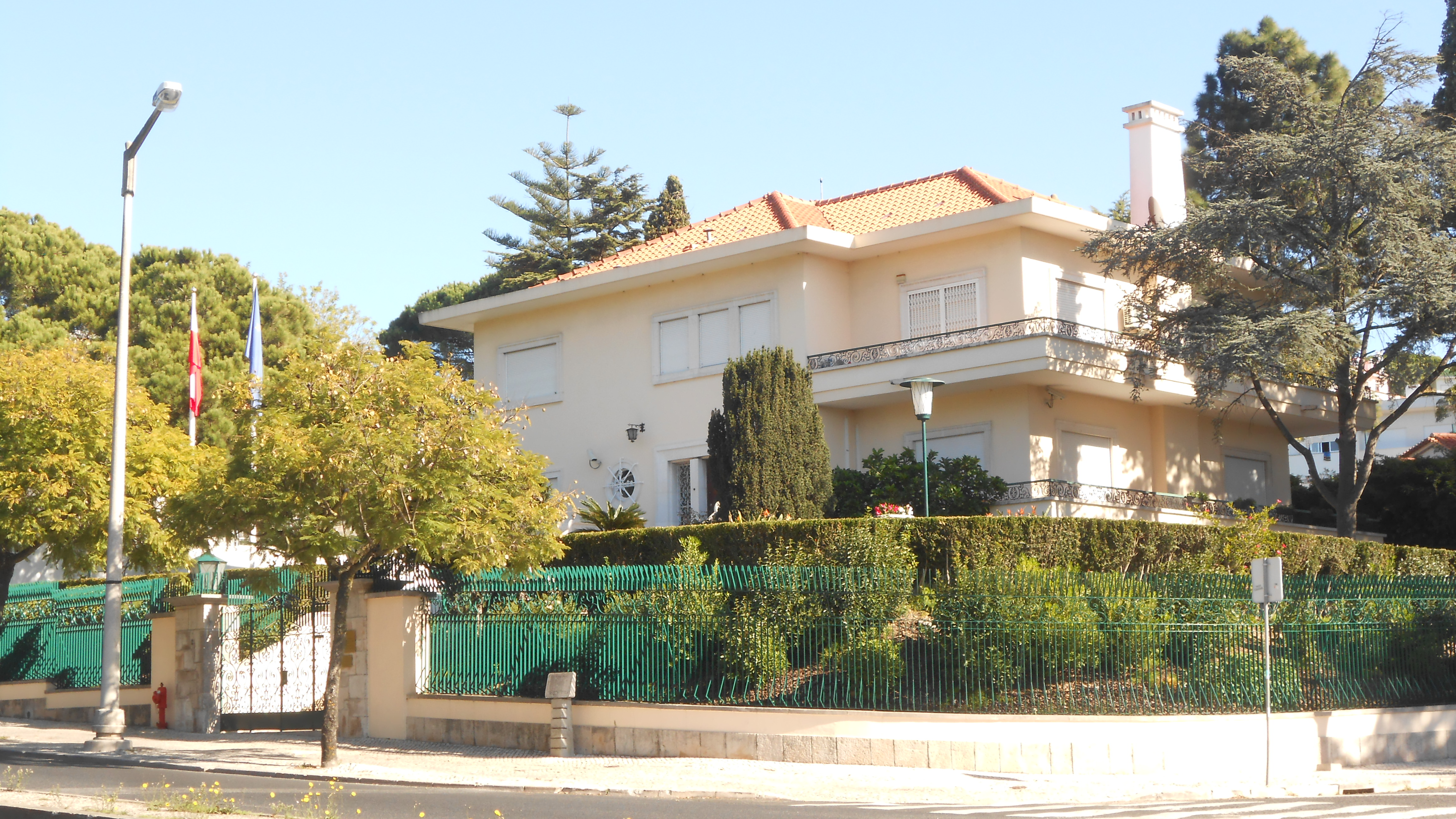
Embassy of Poland in Lisbon

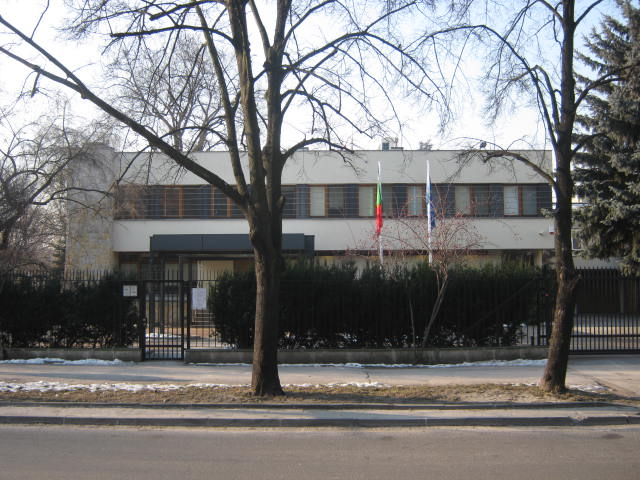
Embassy of Portugal in Warsaw

== See also ==
- Foreign relations of Poland
- Foreign relations of Portugal
