= Iran–Portugal relations =

Diplomatic relations between the Portuguese Republic and the Islamic Republic of Iran

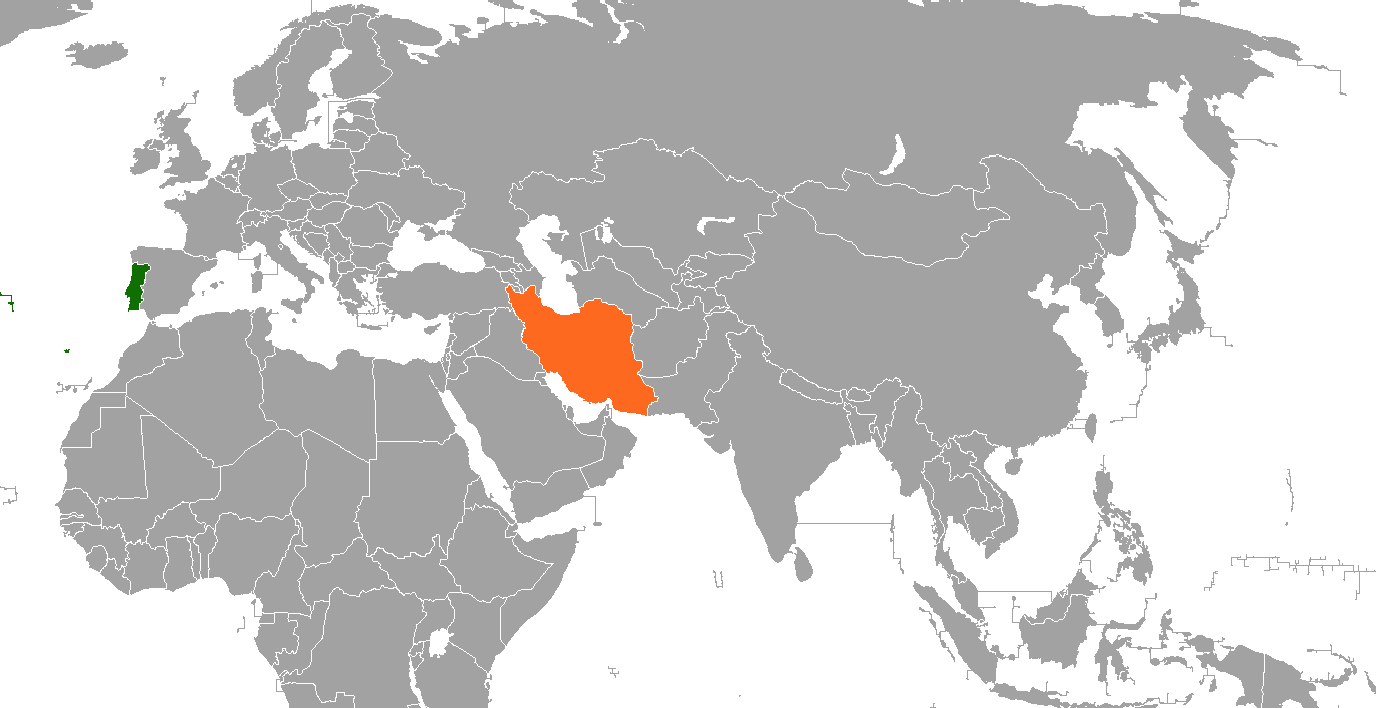

- Portugal: Iran

Diplomatic relations between the Portuguese Republic and the Islamic Republic of Iran date back to the 16th century, following the establishment of the Portuguese State of India. Iran has an embassy in Lisbon. Portugal has an embassy in Tehran.

== History ==
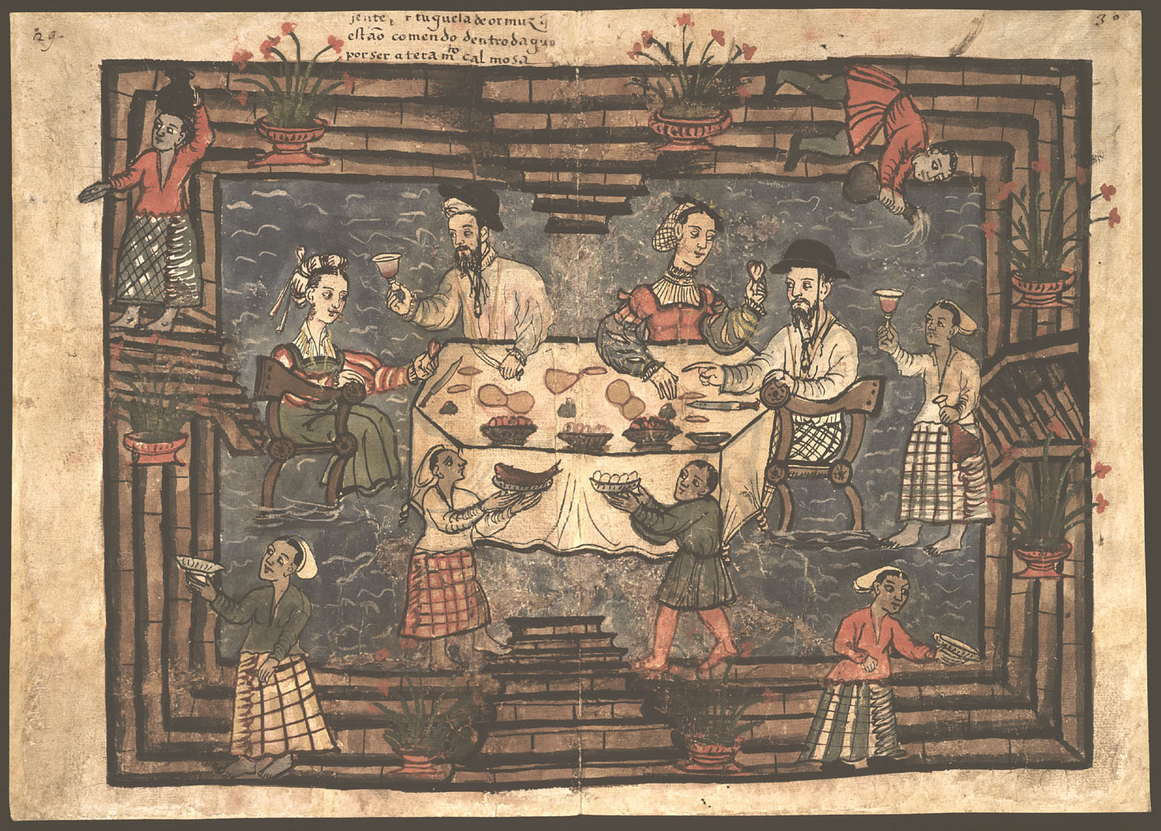
Portuguese residents of Ormuz, c. 1540; they had flooded their homes due to the warm weather.

The first interactions between Portugal and Iran date back to the 16th century, during the period of the Safavid dynasty, when a Portuguese armada led by Afonso de Albuquerque stormed and captured Ormuz in 1507. From that moment on, the two countries initiated a period of intense interaction, with multiple embassies and envoys sent by the two nations. In 1513, Afonso de Albuquerque, as governor of Portuguese India, sent Miguel Ferreira and João Ferreira to Persia, as ambassadors to the Shah Ismail of Persia.

In 1515, after his defeat at the Battle of Chaldiran against the Ottomans, Ismail sought help from Albuquerque, which allowed Portugal to reaffirm its dominance over the Persian Gulf. Albuquerque supported the idea of an Iran-Europe alliance against the Ottomans and urged Ismail to send envoys to Lisbon. In 1580, Portugal lost its independence, but Spain honored the alliance and provided Sultan Muhammad Shah with firearms from Ormuz.

During the reign of Abbas the Great, the Iran-Portugal relations worsened as Abbas resented Portugal-Spain for controlling territories he regarded as rightfully his and enjoying the substantial customs revenue from the trade that passed through Ormuz and the neighbouring mainland port of Gamru, which Portugal also controlled. His resentment was exacerbated by continuing tales of Portuguese ill treatment of Iranian merchants on Ormuz, therefore he allowed Allahverdi Khan to conquer Bahrain, which was yet another portuguese possession. This led to a small skirmish between Portugal and Iran, but Portuguese diplomat Antonio de Gouvea managed to defuse the situation.

After the Peace of Zsitvatorok, which ended the conflicts between the Ottoman Empire and the Habsburg monarchy in 1606, the Ottomans turned their focus on Iran, and Abbas felt betrayed by his allies once more. In 1608, the governor of Lar occupied the island of Qishm, which was the main water supplier of Ormuz. Antonio de Gouvea returned to Iran to mend relations between countries, but the letter he delivered from King Philip of Spain offered no military support and no diplomatic advancements were made. Still, afraid to alienate possible allies, the Abbas didn't further escalate the situation and continued his attempts to re-enlist Portugal-Spain and other European powers in his fight against the Ottomans, but to no avail.

In 1614, the Abbas finally directed his anger against Spain and Portugal by attacking the Portuguese port of Gamru. An attack on Ormuz itself was not feasible due to Iran's lack of warships, in addition to the worsening relations between Iran and the Ottomans. Shah Abbas therefore opened negotiations with the Portuguese on Ormuz, although he made it clear he had no intention of handing back any of the places he had seized.

With an alliance between Iran and England appearing imminent, Portugal-Spain began resorting to increasingly extreme measures to prevent it. The Portuguese had already attempted to kill English ambassador Robert Sherley, by blowing up his house in 1612. Then, in 1619, Portuguese admiral Rui Freire de Andrada was sent to Ormuz with a fleet of five galleons and orders to prevent any other European power trading with Iran and to build a fort on the island of Qishm. However, when Rui Freire's fleet arrived at Ormuz in 1620, it was promptly defeated by the English. Finally, in 1622, the Iranians joined forces with the English and finally retook Ormuz, effectively ending a century of Portuguese hegemony in the Persian Gulf.The Iranians looted the island and kept most of the spoils of war, which angered the English, so when the Iranians asked them for help in attacking Portuguese Muscat, they refused.

At the time, Robert Sherley was in Madrid trying to convince Spain-Portugal to rejoin an anti-Ottoman alliance with Iran, but all his efforts foundered on Spain's condition that Ormuz had to be returned. In 1625, there was an attempt to reclaim Ormuz by Portugal-Spain, which culminated in a great naval battle off Hormuz between eight Portuguese galleons and an Anglo-Dutch fleet of similar strength. With the battle ending in a stalemate, the Portuguese finally gave up on Ormuz.

During the 20th century, the relations between the two countries were renewed, with the first Portuguese consulate in Tehran opening in December 1932, followed by a Portuguese Legation in the same city on 11 May 1956, which would eventually become an embassy. On 15 October 1956, the Envoy Extraordinary and Minister Plenipotentiary of Portugal in Ankara, Luís Norton de Matos, presented his credentials as Non-resident Ambassador in Tehran, becoming the first diplomatic representative of Portugal in Iran in the modern era.

Throughout the first two decades of the 20th century, the relations between the two countries intensified, several bilateral agreements were signed, and a number of official visits by officials from both countries occurred. In 2008, the 500th anniversary of the relations between the two countries was celebrated.

== Bilateral agreements ==
Several bilateral agreements have been signed by the two countries, including:

- Financial Protocol, signed on 10 October 1993.
- Agreement for Cooperation in the Fields of Language, Education, Culture, Sports, Youth, Tourism and Media, signed on 26 January 2015
- Agreement on the suppression of Visas for holders of Diplomatic, Special or Service Passports, signed on 22 April 2017

Furthermore, numerous Memorandums of Understanding were signed between different Ministries of the two countries, regarding cooperation in the fields of Education, Culture, Science, Technology, Sports, Tourism, Historical and Patrimonial Documentation, Agriculture and Political Consultations.

== High-level visits ==
Over the last decades, several high level visits took place, including the following:

=== Visits from Portuguese officials to Iran ===
- 7–11 October 2014, Jorge Barreto Xavier, Secretary of State for Culture
- 23–26 January 2015, Rui Machete, Minister of State and Foreign Affairs
- 15–18 September 2015, Nuno Viera de Brito, Secretary of State for Food and Agri-food Research
- 27–31 May 2016, Jorge Costa Oliveira, Secretary of State of Internationalization
- 17–24 April 2017, Jorge Costa Oliveira, Secretary of State of Internationalization

=== Visits from Iranian officials to Portugal ===
- 7 January 2003, Khamal Kharazi, Minister of Foreign Affairs
- 5 November 2004, Gholamali Khoshroo, Vice-Minister for International Legal Affairs of the Ministry of Foreign Affairs of Iran
- 23 January 2008, Manuchehr Motaki Minister of Foreign Affairs
- September 2008, Mohammad Jahromi, Minister of Labour.
- 15–17 June 2009, Mehdi Safari, Vice-Minister of Foreign Affairs
- 13 July 2010, Manuchehr Motaki, Minister of Foreign Affairs
- 18 June 2014, Reza Salehi Amiri Minister of Culture and Islamic Guidance
- 15 April 2015, Mohammad Javad Zarif, Minister of Foreign Affairs
- 12–13 May 2015, Hassan Ghashghavi, Vice-minister of Foreign Affairs for Consular and Parliamentary Affairs
- 12 May 2016, Hassan Ghashghavi Vice-Minister of Foreign, Consular and Parliamentary Relations, and Iranian Affairs

== Economic relations ==
The two countries maintain a modest, but consistent economic and commercial relationship. The total of goods traded by the two countries in 2019 amounted to 21.99 million dollars, with a surplus from the Portuguese perspective of 5.21 million dollars.

Iran was in 2020 the 104th client of Portuguese exports, with a quota of 0.02% of the total of Portuguese exports in that year, while it was the 130th largest exporter of goods to Portugal, with a quota of 0.002% of the total, in the same period.

The main products exported from Portugal to Iran in 2020 were Agricultural Products, Food Products, Common Metals, Minerals and Ores, and Machinery and other Equipment. In the same year, the main groups of products exported to Portugal by Iran were Minerals and Ores, Agricultural Products and Chemical Products.

== Diplomatic missions ==
- Iran has an embassy in Lisbon.
- Portugal has an embassy in Tehran.
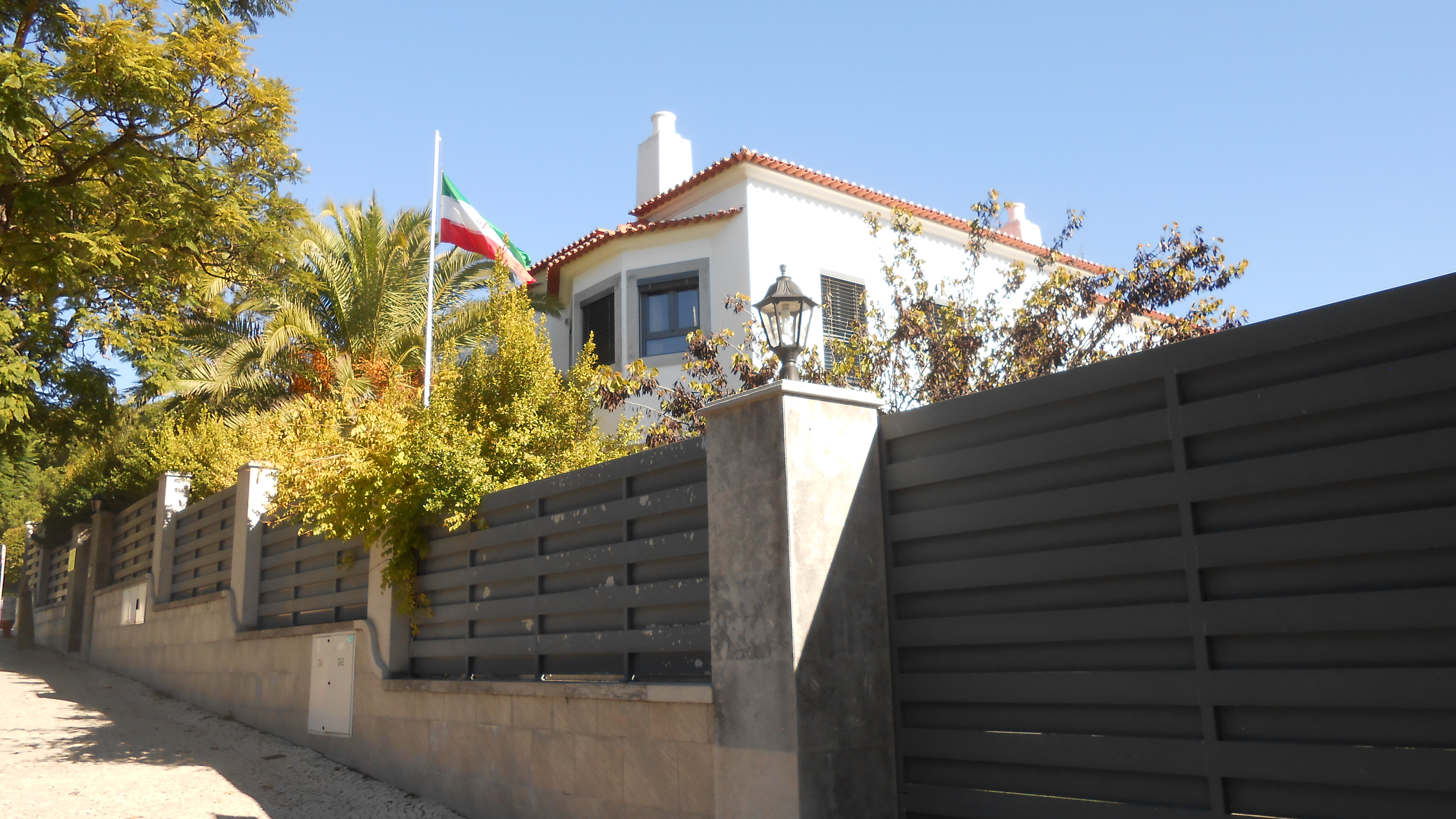
Embassy of Iran in Lisbon

== See also ==
- Foreign relations of Iran
- Foreign relations of Portugal
