= Portugal–Russia relations =

- Portugal: Russia

Diplomatic mission
- Embassy of Portugal, Moscow: Embassy of Russia, Lisbon

Portugal–Russia relations are foreign relations between Portugal and Russia. Portugal has an embassy in Moscow while Russia has an embassy in Lisbon.

The countries are the easternmost and westernmost in Europe. Both countries are full members of the Organization for Security and Co-operation in Europe.

== History ==
Full, ambassador-level, diplomatic relations between Portugal and the Russian Empire date back to 1779. Earlier, in 1724, Portuguese merchants appealed to Peter I to establish trading missions. Peter responded with appointment of a consul in Lisbon. There is no evidence, however, that the Lisbon consulate was actually established at that time. Trading between the two countries developed slowly, and the Russian consulate in Lisbon finally opened in 1769, headed by João António Borscher, a Portuguese-German banker from Hamburg. Borscher was not keenly interested in promoting Portuguese business interests, and trade between the two countries remained insignificant.

In September 1779, Maria I appointed her former ambassador to the Netherlands, Francisco José Horta Macedo, as Portugal's ambassador to Russia, who would be based in the imperial capital of Saint Petersburg. Catherine II responded by appointing Count Wilhelm Nesselrode as her ambassador to Portugal. These contacts resulted in the 1782 Treaty on Armed Neutrality and the 1787 Treaty on Commerce. In 1799, the two countries signed a defensive alliance that did not precipitate into direct military action.

For most of the 19th century, relations remained uneventful, but they gained momentum in the last decade of the century, when the Imperial Russian Navy began regularly using Portuguese ports for replenishments. The crew of the Russian imperial yacht Tsesarevna in particular were hailed for their actions in fighting the 1895 fire at the Portuguese Parliament. However, during the Russo-Japanese War in 1904, Portugal sided with the United Kingdom and refused to allow the Imperial Russian Navy access to its ports.

After the Bolshevik Revolution of 1917 in Russia, ties between two countries were severed in 1918. Bilateral relations with the USSR were not established until 1974 following the Carnation Revolution in Portugal and the overthrow of the Estado Novo.

After the beginning of the Russian invasion of Ukraine, Portugal, as one of the EU countries, imposed sanctions on Russia, following which Russia added all EU countries to its list of "unfriendly nations". In the spring of 2022, Portugal joined other EU countries in declaring a number of Russian diplomats persona non grata.

This, adding to some claims made by Russian ministers such as "how much does Lisbon cost?" and that Russia would stretch from Lisbon to Vladivostok, is the main reason for bilateral relations being cold and nearly nonexistent since February 2022.

== Resident diplomatic missions ==
- Portugal has an embassy in Moscow.
- Russia has an embassy in Lisbon.
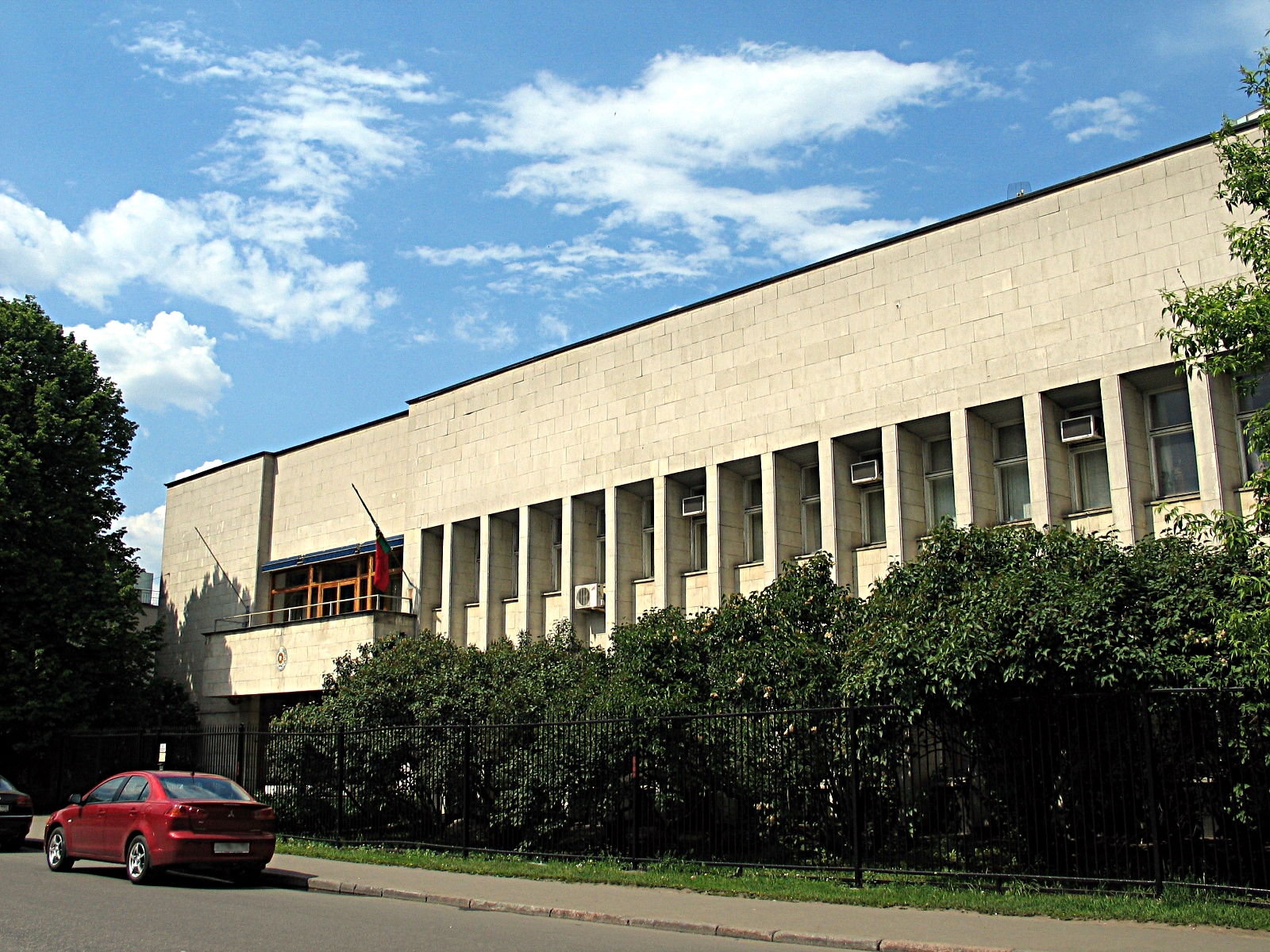
Embassy of Portugal in Moscow

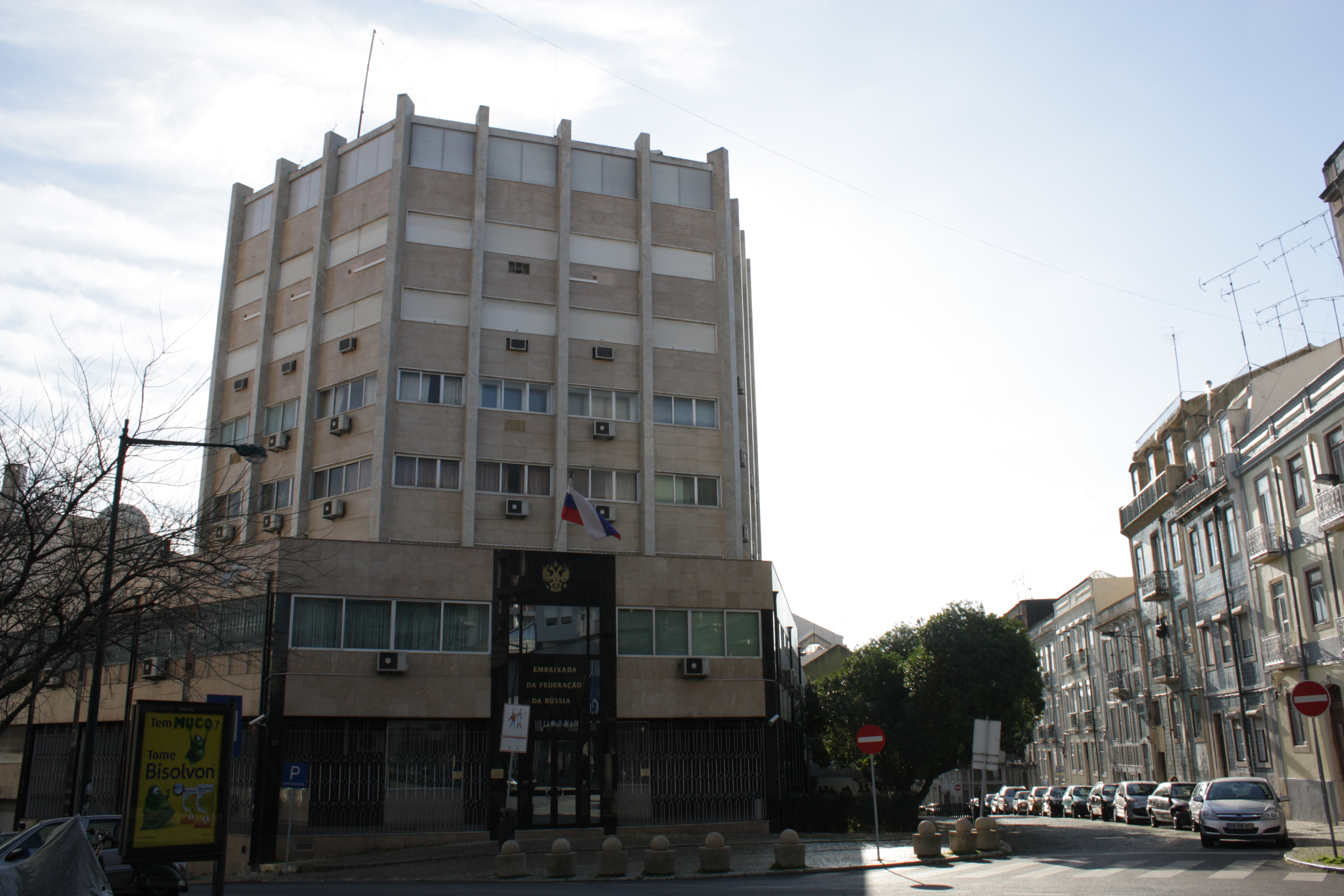
Embassy of Russia in Lisbon

== See also ==
- Foreign relations of Portugal
- Foreign relations of Russia
- Russia–European Union relations
- List of ambassadors of Russia to Portugal
