= List of international trips made by Josip Broz Tito =

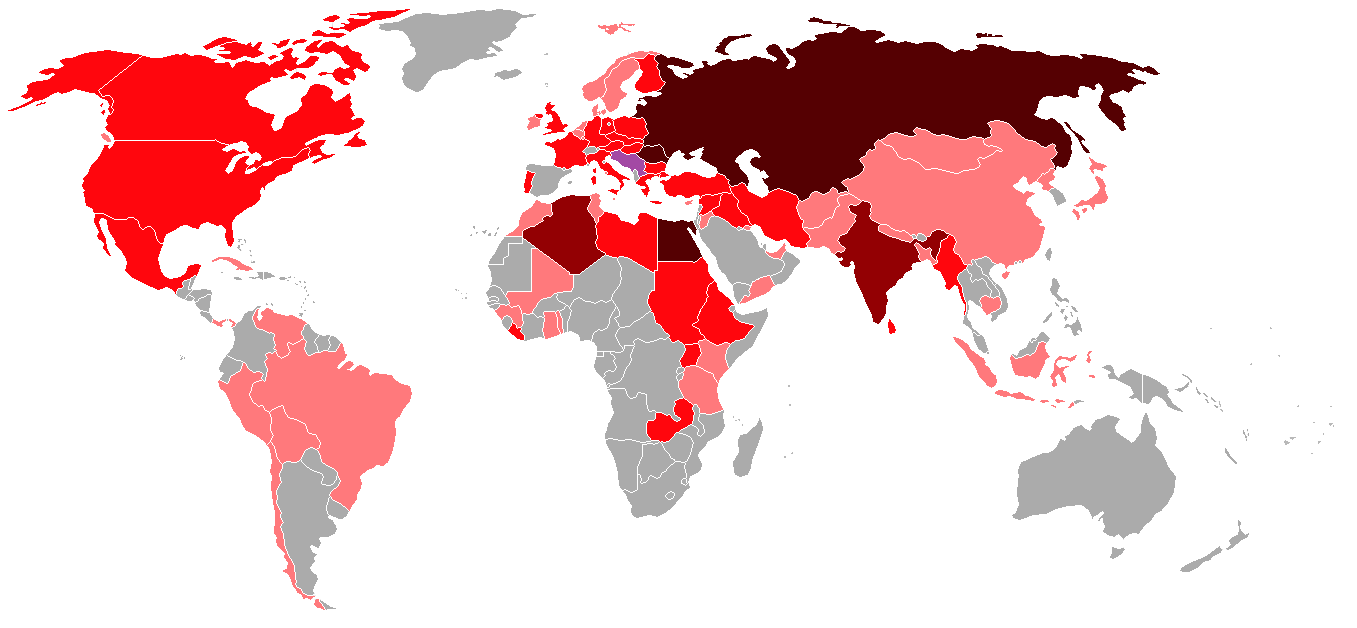
Map showing international visits by Josip Broz Tito during his reign. Yugoslavia 10 or more visits 5-9 visits 2-4 visits 1 visit

This is a list of international trips made by Josip Broz Tito, during his tenure as the prime minister and later President of Yugoslavia. Josip Broz Tito visited 72 countries during his time in office, between 1944 and his death in 1980. Tito's oversea trips were often named "Peace travels" by Yugoslavian media.

Countries that Tito visited at least ten times were: The Soviet Union (17 visits), Romania (14) and Egypt (14).

== During World War II ==
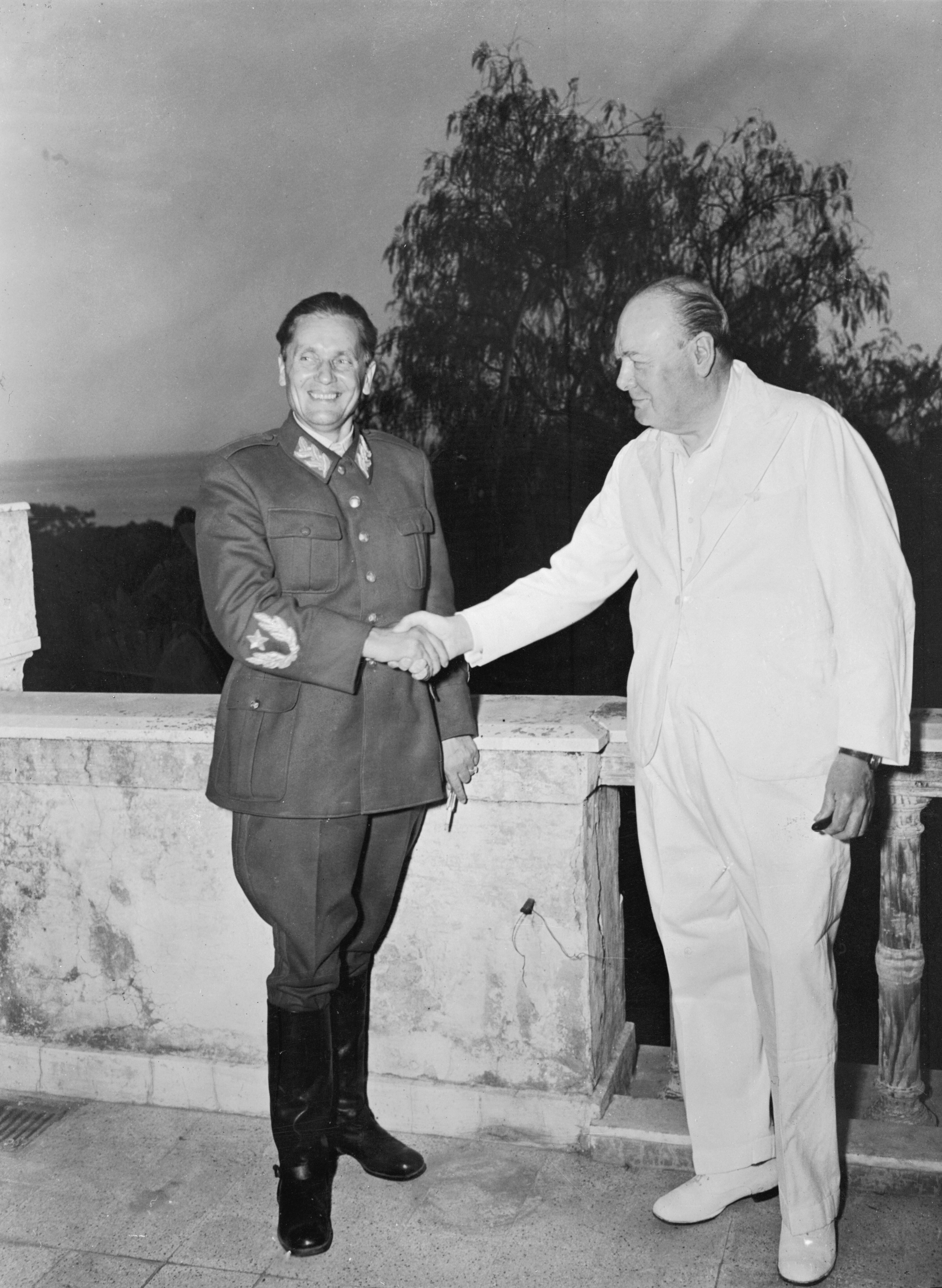
Tito meeting with Churchill in Caserta, near Naples, August 1944

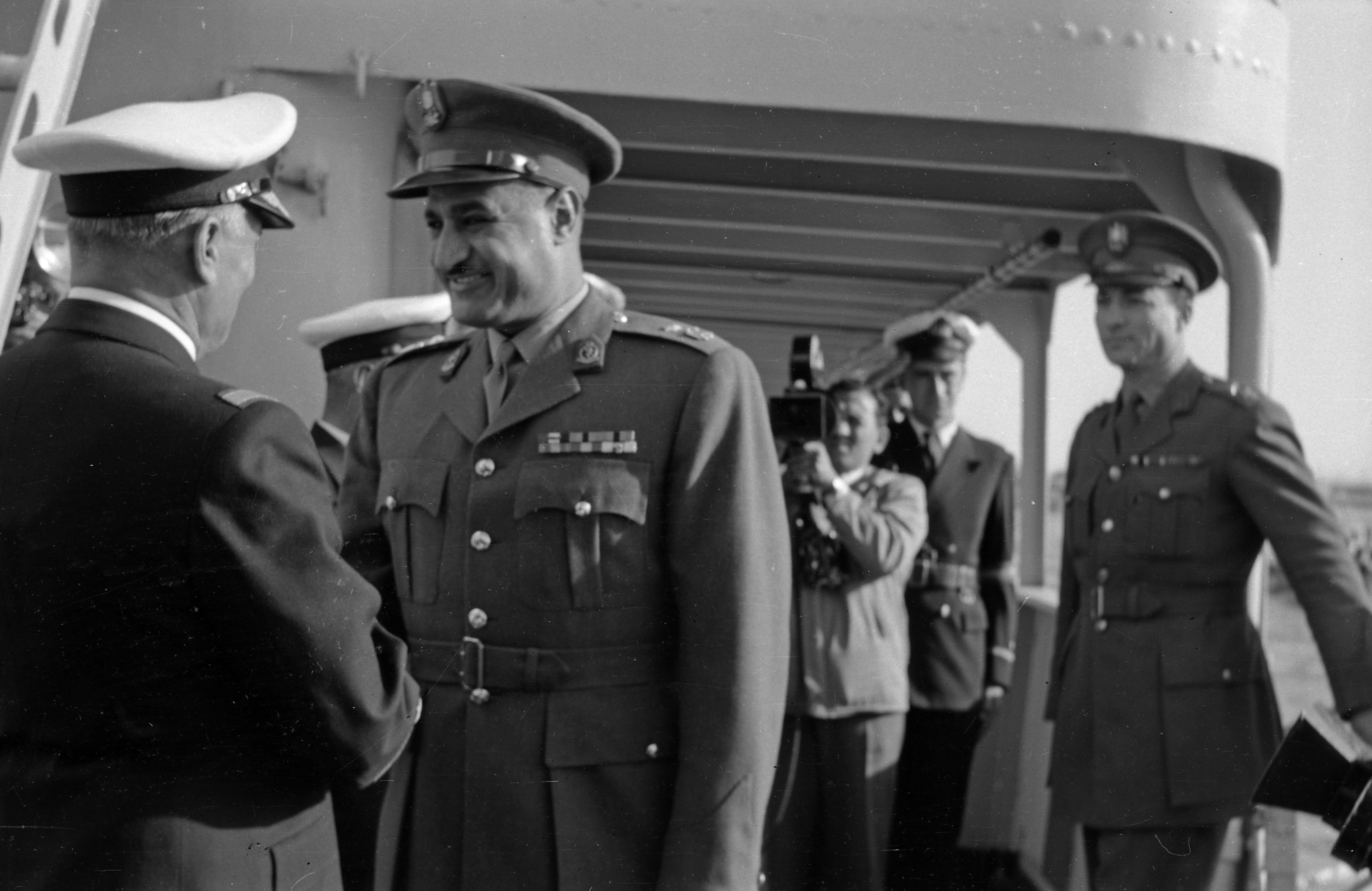
First meeting of Tito and Nasser onboard Yugoslav ship Galeb in the Suez Canal, February 1955

This is the list of Tito's foreign trips as the president of the National Committee for the Liberation of Yugoslavia, before the formation of the Provisional Government, i.e. before Tito was internationally recognized as the Prime Minister of Yugoslavia:

	Dates	Country	Locations	Details
(1)	June 4–6, 1944	(Kingdom of Italy) Italy	Bari	Met with John Slessor, Sir Fitzroy Maclean, and Vivian Street.
(2)	August 6–15, 1944	(Kingdom of Italy) Italy	Caserta, Lake Bolsena, Rome, Naples, Capri, Bari	Held talks with Henry Maitland Wilson, Supreme Allied Commander in the Mediterranean. Met with general Harold Alexander. Held talks with the British prime minister Winston Churchill. Met with Ivan Šubašić, prime minister of the Yugoslav government-in-exile. Met with James Gammell, Wilson's Chief of Staff.
(3)	September 19–21, 1944	(Kingdom of Romania) Romania	Craiova	Spent some time in the Soviet base in Craiova en route to Moscow.
(3)	September 21–28, 1944	Soviet Union	Moscow	Tito's secret trip to Moscow. Held talks with premier Joseph Stalin. Tito and Stalin agreed on the Red Army's participation in the Belgrade offensive.
(3)	September 28 – October 15, 1944	(Kingdom of Romania) Romania	Craiova	Spent some time in the Soviet base in Craiova while returning from Moscow. Tito commanded the Belgrade offensive from Craiova until October 15 when he travelled to Vršac

== 1940s ==
	Dates	Country	Locations	Details
1	April 5–20, 1945	Soviet Union	Moscow	Held talks with premier Stalin. Tito and foreign minister Vyacheslav Molotov, in the presence of Stalin, signed the Treaty of Friendship, Mutual Assistance and Postwar Cooperation between the governments of Soviet Union and Yugoslavia.
2	March 14–19, 1946	Poland	Warsaw	Met with Bolesław Bierut, president of the State National Council. Tito awarded the Order of Virtuti Militari. Signing of a Treaty of Friendship and Mutual Assistance between the governments of Poland and Yugoslavia.
2	March 20–24, 1946	Czechoslovakia	Prague, Bratislava	Met with President Edvard Beneš and Prime Minister Zdeněk Fierlinger.
3	May 27 – June 10, 1946	Soviet Union	Moscow	Held official talks with Stalin and Molotov. Tito took part in the funeral of Mikhail Kalinin.
4	November 25–28, 1947	Bulgaria	Sofia, Varna	Met with prime minister Georgi Dimitrov and interim president Vasil Kolarov. Tito awarded the Order of People's Freedom and the Order of the 9 September 1944 with Swords. Signing of a Treaty of Friendship, Cooperation and Mutual Assistance between Bulgaria and Yugoslavia.
5	December 6–8, 1947	Hungary	Budapest	Met with prime minister Lajos Dinnyés and Imre Nagy, speaker of the national assembly. Signing of a Treaty of Friendship and Mutual Assistance between Yugoslavia and Hungary.
6	December 17–19, 1947	Romania	Bucharest	Met with prime minister Petru Groza. Signing of a Treaty of Friendship and Mutual Assistance between Yugoslavia and Romania.

== 1950s ==
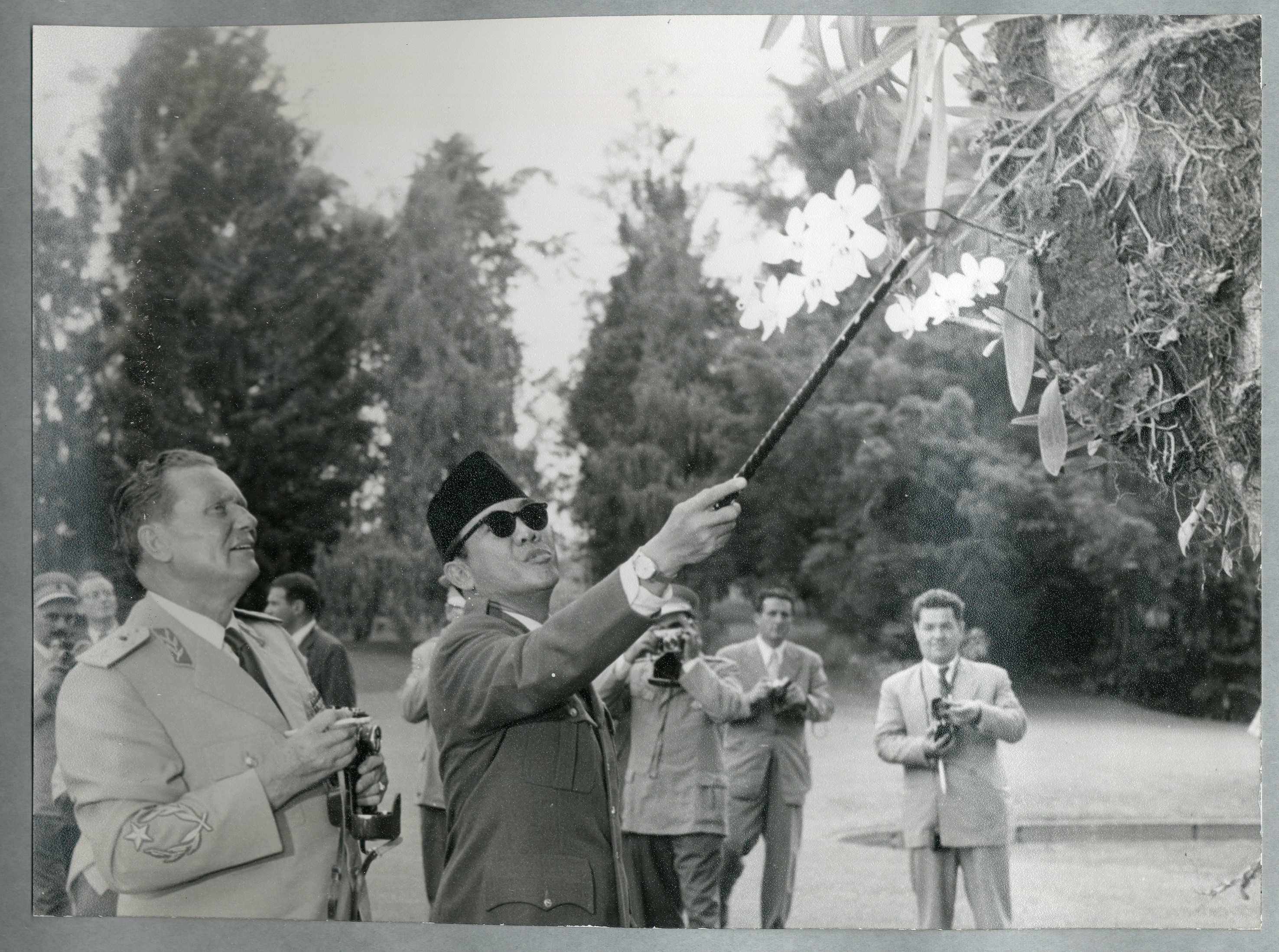
Tito with Sukarno while visiting Indonesia in December 1958

	Dates	Country	Locations	Details
7	March 16–21, 1953	United Kingdom	London, Cambridge	Met with prime minister Churchill, and Queen Elizabeth II. Happening only about a dozen of days since Joseph Stalin's death, this was the first time Tito left Yugoslavia since the Tito–Stalin split in 1948.
8	April 12–18, 1954	Turkey	Istanbul, Ankara	Met with president Celâl Bayar. Talks about the further cooperation within the Balkan Pact.
9	June 2–6, 1954	(Kingdom of Greece) Greece	Athens, Thessaloniki	Met with prime minister Alexandros Papagos and King Paul. Talks about the further cooperation within the Balkan Pact.
10	December 9, 1954	Aden Colony	Aden	Short visit while traveling to India. Met with Tom Hickinbotham, governor of Aden.
10	December 16, 1954 – January 1, 1955	India	Bombay, New Delhi, Bhakra Dam, Simla, Chandigarh, Gwalior, Agra, Lucknow, Benares, Sindri, Calcutta	Met with president Rajendra Prasad. Political talks with prime minister Jawaharlal Nehru. Tito spoke in the Indian parliament on 21 December. Signed "Delhi Declaration" on December 22.
10	January 6–17, 1955	Union of Burma	Rangoon, Taung-Gyi, Mandalay, Maymyo, Nyaung-U, Pagan, Chauk	Met with president Ba U. Held political talks with prime minister U Nu. Tito awarded the Order of Thiri Thudhamma.
10	January 21–25, 1955	India	Madras, Mysore, Cochin	Visited India again while traveling back home from Burma.
10	January 31, 1955	Aden Colony	Aden	Short visit while traveling back home. Met with governor Hickinbotham.
10	February 5–6, 1955	Egypt	Port Said	Held talks with Egyptian president Gamal Abdel Nasser onboard Galeb while traveling through the Suez Canal.
11	December 5–6, 1955	Egypt	Port Said, Port Fuad	Short visit while traveling to Ethiopia.
11	December 11–24, 1955	Ethiopian Empire	Assab, Addis Ababa, Awash, Dessie, Maychew, Adwa, Axum, Asmara, Massawa	Held talks with emperor Haile Selassie.
11	December 28, 1955 – January 6, 1956	Egypt	Suez, Cairo, Giza pyramids, Luxor, Valley of the Kings, Aswan, Alexandria	Held talks with president Nasser. Tito awarded the Order of the Nile.
12	May 7–12, 1956	France	Paris, Versailles	Met with president René Coty. Held talks with prime minister Guy Mollet. Tito awarded the Legion of Honour and the Croix de Guerre.
13	June 1–23, 1956	Soviet Union	Kishinev, Moscow, Leningrad, Stalingrad, Krasnodar, Novorossiysk, Sochi, Kiev	Held political talks with premier Nikolai Bulganin, and Nikita Khrushchev, first secretary of the Communist Party. Met with Kliment Voroshilov, chairman of the Presidium of the Supreme Soviet. Tito and Khrushchev signed the "Declaration on the Relations between the SKJ and the CPSU".
13	June 24–27, 1956	Romania	Bucharest, Ploești, Snagov	Held political talks with prime minister Chivu Stoica. Met the general secretary of the Communist Party, Gheorghe Gheorghiu-Dej.
14	July 24–28, 1956	(Kingdom of Greece) Greece	Corfu	Met with King Paul. Met with prime minister Konstantinos Karamanlis.
15	September 28 – October 5, 1956	Soviet Union	Sevastopol, Yalta	Tito traveled from Belgrade to Crimea accompanied by Khrushchev, who previously visited Yugoslavia. Tito and his wife vacationed in Yalta together with Khrushchev, Ernő Gerő, first secretary of the Hungarian Working People's Party, and premier Bulganin. Tito also met with Voroshilov.
16	August 1–2, 1957	Romania	Snagov	Talks with the delegation of the Communist Party of the Soviet Union headed by Nikita Khrushchev and Anastas Mikoyan.
17	December 5, 1958	United Arab Republic	Port Said	Met with president Gamal Abdel Nasser.
17	December 23, 1958 – January 1, 1959	Indonesia	Jakarta, Bogor, Bandung, Bali	Held political talks with president Sukarno and prime minister Djuanda. Tito awarded the Guerilla Star.
17	January 8–10, 1959	Union of Burma	Rangoon	Met with president Win Maung. Held political talks with prime minister Ne Win.
17	January 13–19, 1959	India	Madras, New Delhi, Hyderabad, Madura	Met with president Prasad. Political talks with prime minister Nehru.
17	January 21–26, 1959	Ceylon	Colombo, Kandy, Nuwara Eliya	Met with governor-general Oliver Goonetilleke. Held political talks with prime minister S. W. R. D. Bandaranaike. Tito and Bandaranaike signed joint declaration.
17	February 2–12, 1959	Ethiopian Empire	Massawa, Asmara, Addis Ababa, Maji	Held political talks with emperor Haile Selassie. Tito spent several days hunting around Maji. Haile Selassie presented Tito a villa in the Urael neighborhood of Addis Ababa.
17	February 12–18, 1959	Sudan	Khartoum, Wad Madani, Sennar Dam, El Obeid, Port Sudan	Held political talks with the chairman of the Supreme Council, Ibrahim Abboud.
17	February 20–28, 1959	United Arab Republic	Suez, Cairo, Damascus, Homs, Hama, Aleppo, Latakia	Held political talks with president Gamal Abdel Nasser. Visited Syria with Nasser and Yemeni prince Muhammad al-Badr. Met with Shukri al-Quwatli, former President of Syria.
17	March 2–6, 1959	(Kingdom of Greece) Greece	Rhodes, Thessaloniki	Held political talks with prime minister Karamanlis.

== 1960s ==
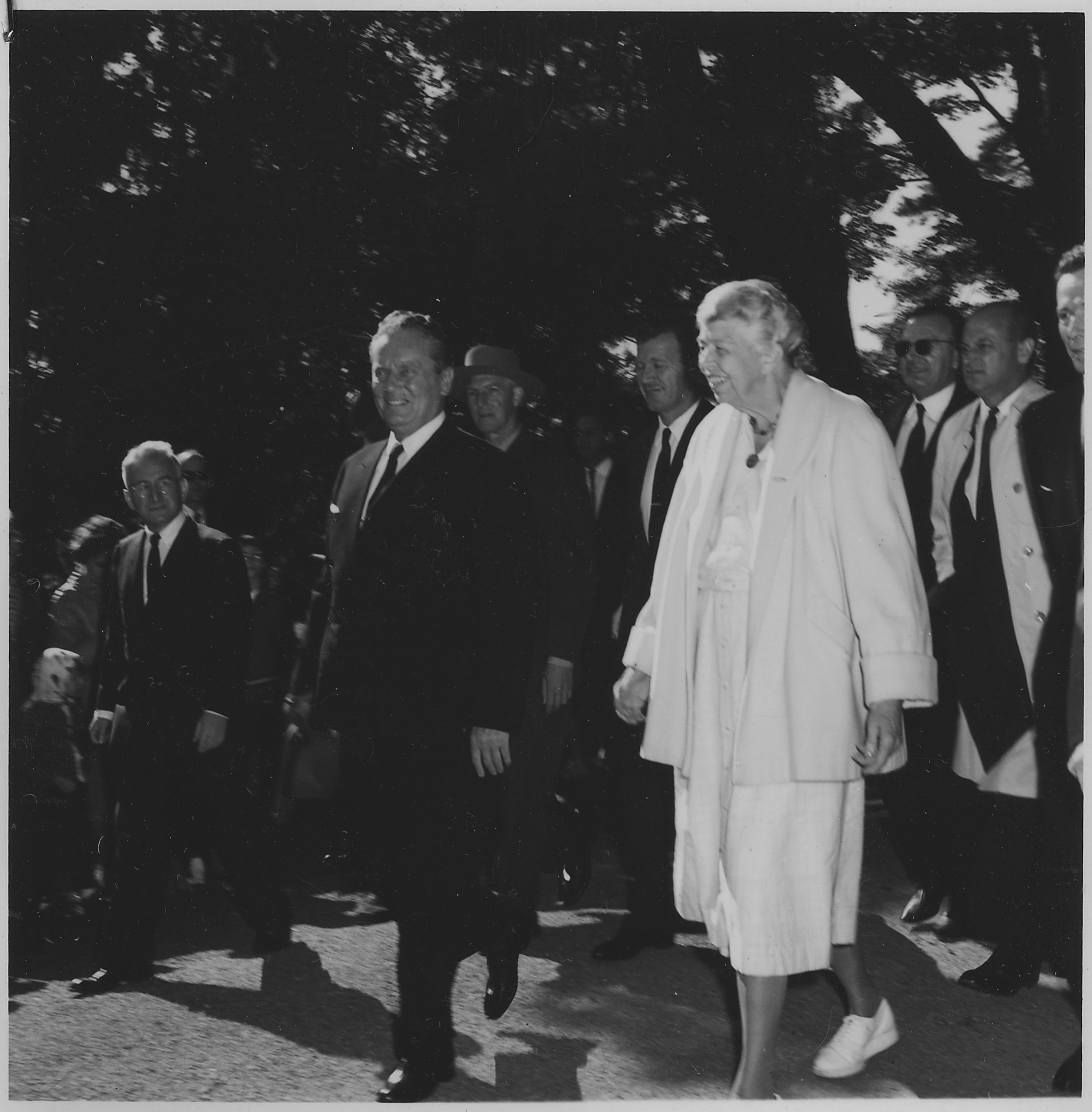
Tito with Eleanor Roosevelt in Hyde Park, New York, October 1960

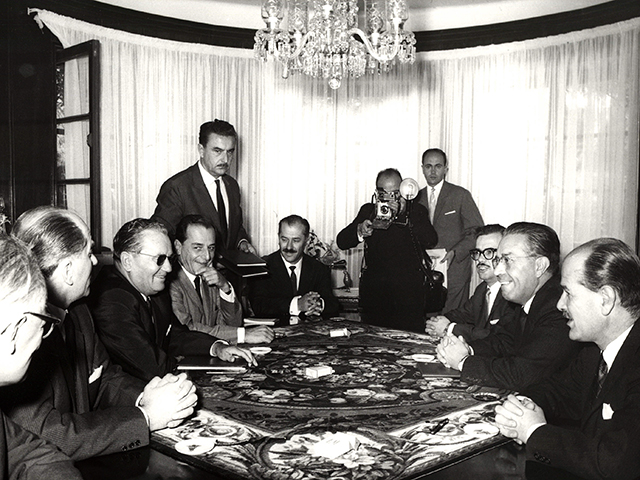
Tito and Bolivian president Paz Estenssoro during the Yugoslavia-Bolivia talks in Cochabamba, September 1963

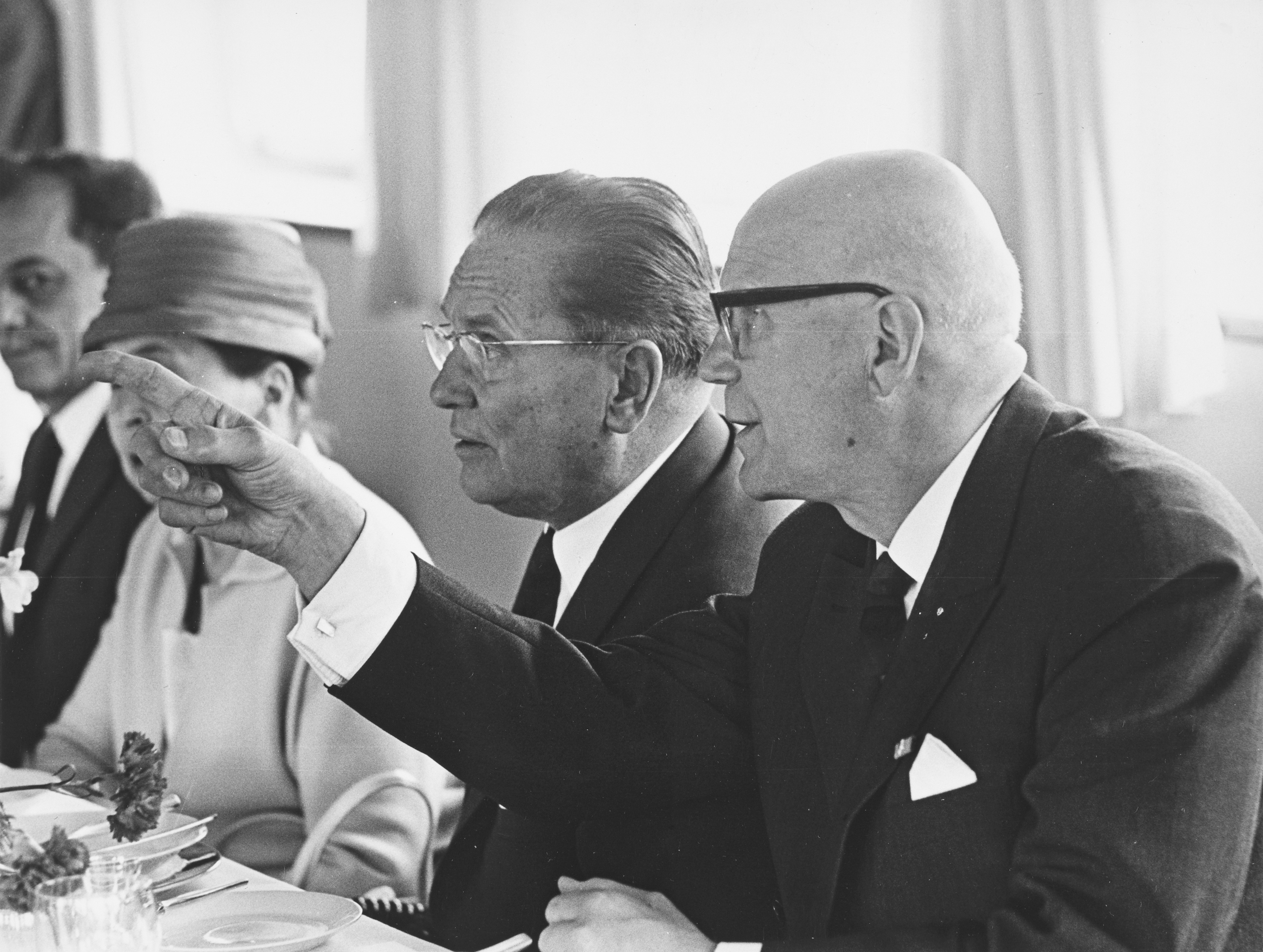
Tito with Finnish president Kekkonen in Helsinki during the June 1964 visit

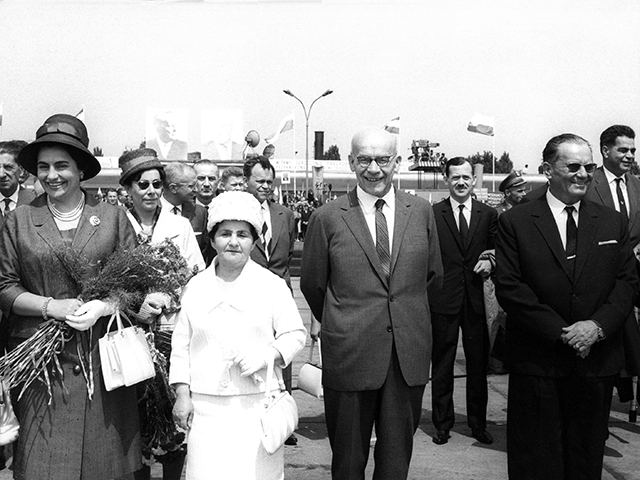
Tito and Jovanka with Władysław Gomułka and his wife Zofia at the Warsaw's Okecie airport, June 1964

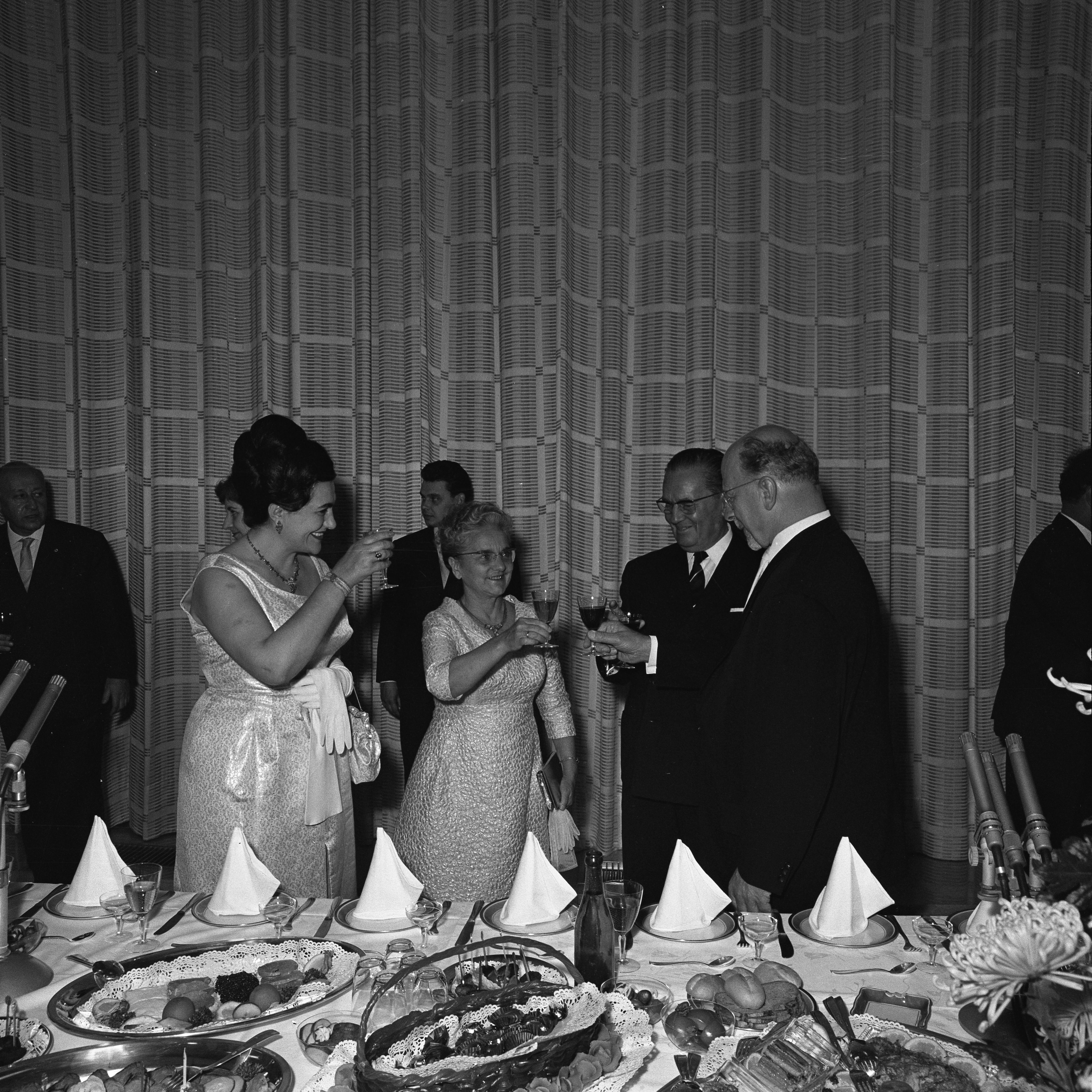
Jovanka Broz, Lotte Ulbricht, Josip Broz Tito and Walter Ulbricht in East Berlin, June 1965

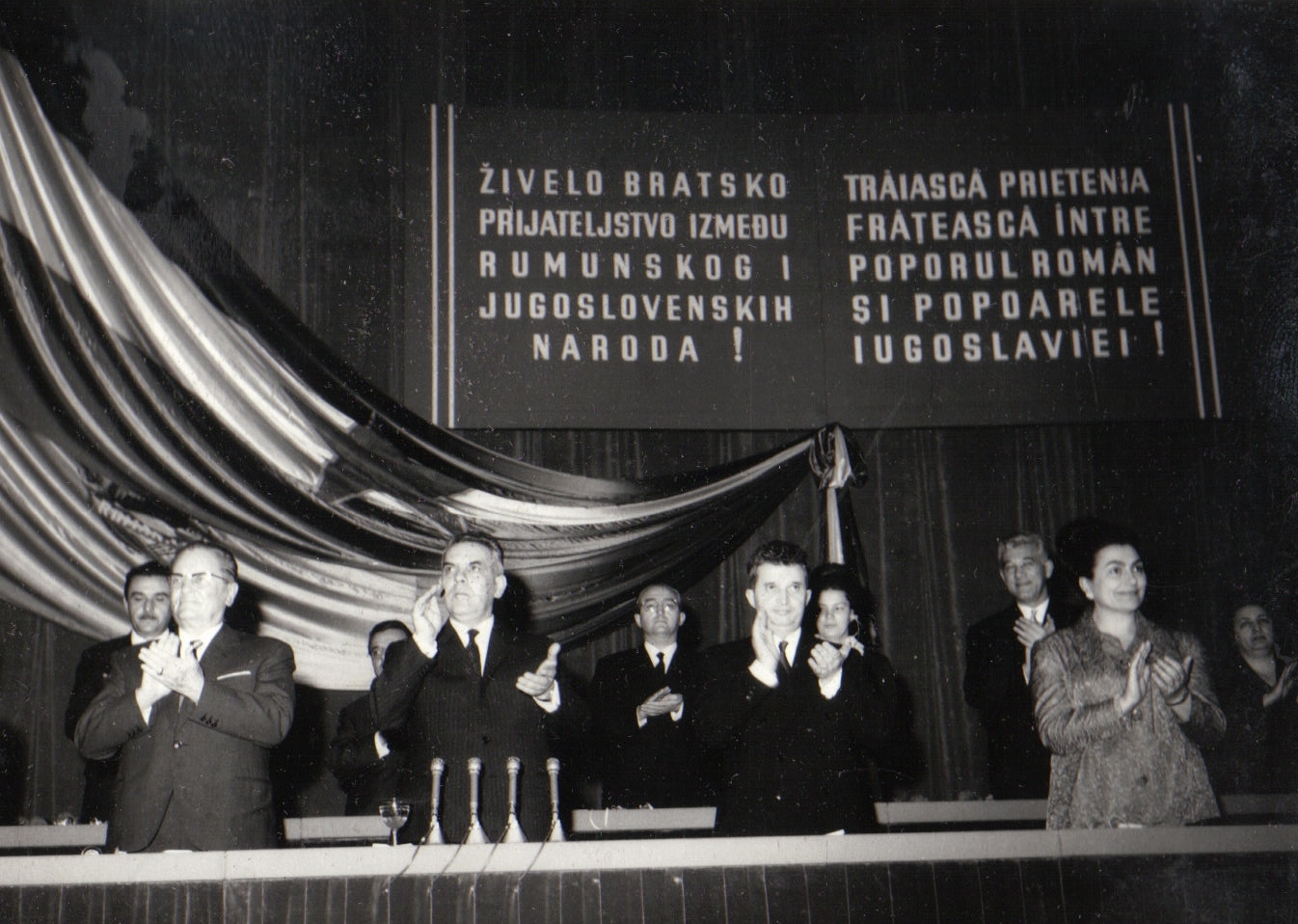
Tito and Ceausescu at the Romanian-Yougoslav friendship meeting in Bucharest, April 1966

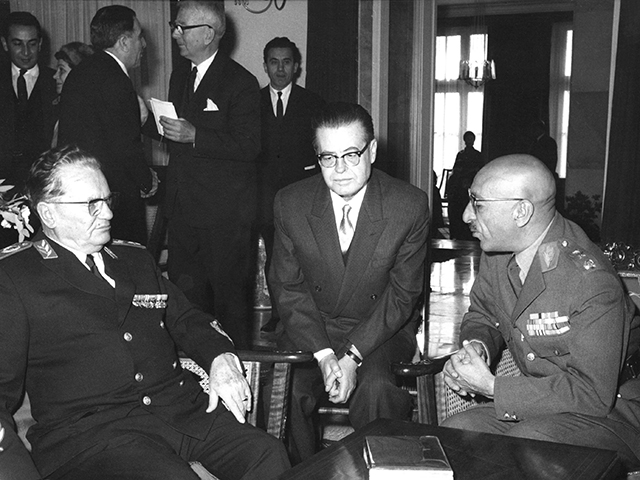
Tito with Afghan king Mohammed Zahir Shah in the Chihil Sutun Palace, Kabul, January 1968

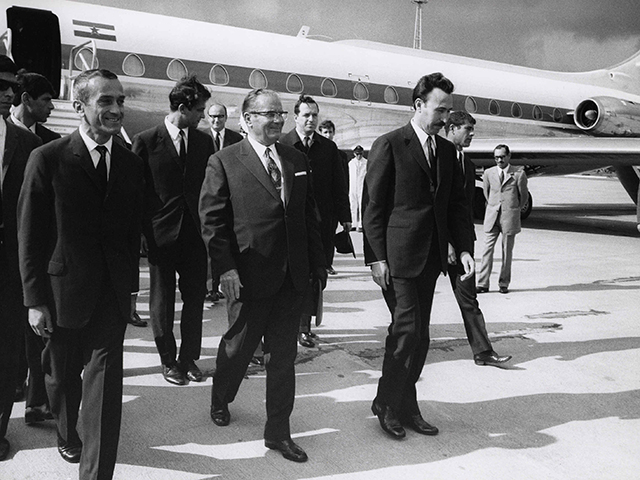
Tito and Houari Boumediene at the Algiers Airport, November 1969

	Dates	Country	Locations	Details
18	September 14–15, 1960	France	Paris	Short visit to Paris on route to New York.
18	September 20 – October 4, 1960	United States	New York City, Hyde Park	Participated in the fifteenth session of the United Nations General Assembly. Met with US president Dwight Eisenhower. Met with Cambodian chief of state Norodom Sihanouk. Met with Indian prime minister Nehru. Met with the president of UAR, Nasser. Met with Soviet premier Khrushchev. Met with Ghanaian president Kwame Nkrumah. Tito hosted a five-party meeting attended by Nehru, Nasser, Nkrumah and Indonesian president Sukarno. Met with Lebanese prime minister Saeb Salam and Nepalese prime minister BP Koirala. Tito visited F. D. Roosevelt Presidential Library and Museum with Eleanor Roosevelt.
18	October 12, 1960	Italy	Naples	Short visit while traveling back home.
19	February 28 – March 4, 1961	Ghana	Accra	Held political talks with president Kwame Nkrumah. Tito spoke in the Parliament of Ghana.
19	March 4–7, 1961	Togo	Lomé, Kpalimé	Held official talks with prime minister Sylvanus Olympio.
19	March 7–11, 1961	Ghana	Accra, Kumasi, Tafo, Koforidua	Continuation of Tito's visit to Ghana after returning from Togo.
19	March 13–18, 1961	Liberia	Monrovia, Totota, Kakata	Held official talks with president William Tubman. Tito awarded the Order of the Pioneers of Liberia. Tito spoke in the Liberian parliament. Tito participated in the celebration of the 160th birthday of Joseph Jenkins Roberts, first president of Liberia.
19	March 20–24, 1961	Guinea	Conakry, Mamou, Kindia, Kissidougou, Kankan	Held official talks with president Ahmed Sékou Touré.
19	March 25–26, 1961	Mali	Bamako	Held talks with president Modibo Keïta.
19	March 26, 1961	Guinea	Conakry	Continuation of visit after returning from Mali. Met with president Sékou Touré again.
19	April 1–6, 1961	Morocco	Rabat, Meknes, Ifrane, Fez, Casablanca	Held talks with king Hassan II. Tito awarded the Order of Muhammad.
19	April 9–14, 1961	Tunisia	Tunis, Nabeul, Hammamet, Carthage, Kairouan, Monastir, Sousse	Held official talks with president Habib Bourguiba. Tito spoke to the Tunisian parliament. Met with Ferhat Abbas, president of the Provisional Government of the Algerian Republic.
19	April 17–22, 1961	United Arab Republic	Alexandria, El Alamein, Cairo, Sakkara	Held official talks with president Nasser. Tito and Nasser issued joint declaration on the Bay of Pigs Invasion.
20	November 17–20, 1961	United Arab Republic	Cairo	Participated in the tripartite talks with president Nasser and Indian prime minister Nehru.
21	February 4–14, 1962	United Arab Republic	Alexandria, Cairo, Luxor, Hurghada, Aswan, Aswan Dam, Safaga, Abu Simbel	Held political talks with president Nasser.
21	February 15–18, 1962	Sudan	Wadi Halfa, Khartoum	Held unofficial talks with president Abboud.
21	February 18–21, 1962	United Arab Republic	Cairo, Alexandria	Continuation of the Tito-Nasser talks. Tito met with Kenneth Kaunda, president of the United National Independence Party of Northern Rhodesia.
22	December 2–3, 1962	Hungary	Budapest	Short visit while traveling to the Soviet Union. Had dinner with István Dobi, chairman of the Presidential Council and prime minister János Kádár.
22	December 3–21, 1962	Soviet Union	Moscow, Volgograd, Kiev	Tito spent vacation in the Soviet Union. Held unofficial talks premier Nikita Khrushchev.
22	December 21, 1962	Hungary	Budapest	Short visit while traveling back home from the Soviet Union. Met with Dobi and Kádár.
23	September 18, 1963	Liberia	Monrovia	Short break while traveling to Brazil. Met with vice president William Tolbert.
23	September 18–23, 1963	Brazil	Brasília, Anápolis, Goiânia	Held talks with president João Goulart. Tito spoke in the National Congress of Brazil.
23	September 23–28, 1963	Chile	Santiago, Viña del Mar	Held talks with president Jorge Alessandri.
23	September 28 – October 3, 1963	Bolivia	Cochabamba	Held political talks with president Víctor Paz Estenssoro.
23	October 3, 1963	Peru	Lima	Short visit while traveling from Bolivia to Mexico. Met with president Fernando Belaúnde.
23	October 3–16, 1963	Mexico	Mérida, Mexico City, Teotihuacan, Guadalajara, Acapulco	Held official talks with president Adolfo López Mateos.
23	October 16–25, 1963	United States	Williamsburg, Washington, D.C., New York City, Princeton University	Had talks with president John F. Kennedy. Participated in the eighteenth session of the United Nations General Assembly.
23	November 1, 1963	United Kingdom	Port of Southampton, Hurn Airport	Short break while traveling back home from the US. Met with Lord Carrington and Lord Ashburton.
24	June 1–8, 1964	Finland	Helsinki, Valkeakoski, Rovaniemi	Held political talks with president Urho Kekkonen.
24	June 8–9, 1964	Soviet Union	Leningrad	Had talks with premier Nikita Khrushchev.
25	June 22, 1964	Romania	near Timișoara	Met with Gheorghe Gheorghiu-Dej, president of the State Council.
26	June 25 – July 2, 1964	Poland	Warsaw, Katowice, Oświęcim, Kraków, Gdańsk, Łańskie Lake	Held political talks with Władysław Gomułka, Aleksander Zawadzki and Józef Cyrankiewicz. Hunting trip to the Łańskie Lake near Olsztyn.
27	September 7, 1964	Romania	Đerdap I, Turnu Severin	Tito and Gheorghiu-Dej dedicated two memorial plaques (one at the each side of the Danube) at the construction ground of the future Iron Gate I Hydroelectric Power Station. The construction work officially started. Tito briefly crossed to the Romanian side of the river and visited Turnu Severin with Gheorghiu-Dej.
28	September 11–16, 1964	Hungary	Budapest, Dunaújváros, Besnyő	Had official political talks with János Kádár and István Dobi. Tito awarded the Order of the Flag of the People's Republic of Hungary.
29	October 2–16, 1964	United Arab Republic	Alexandria, Cairo, Giza	Participated in the 2nd Summit of the Non-Aligned Movement. Held political talks with Nasser. Met with Algerian president Ahmed Ben Bella. Met with Ceylonese prime minister Sirimavo Bandaranaike. Met with Indian prime minister Lal Bahadur Shastri. Met with Sudanese president Abboud. Met with Tunisian president Habib Bourguiba. Met with Lao prime minister Souvanna Phouma. Met with Afghani prime minister Mohammad Yusuf. Met with Indonesian president Sukarno. Met with Syrian president Amin al-Hafiz. Met with Ugandan prime minister Milton Obote. Met with Ethiopian emperor Haile Selassie. Met with Abdullah al-Sallal, president of the Yemen Arab Republic. Met with Sourou-Migan Apithy, president of Dahomey. Met with Mauritanian president Moktar Ould Daddah. Met with provisional prime minister of Angola Holden Roberto. Met with Cypriot president Makarios III. Met with Ghanaian president Nkrumah. Met with Cameroonian president Ahmadou Ahidjo. Met with Guinean president Ahmed Sékou Touré.
29	October 16, 1964	Cyprus	Nicosia	Had political talks with president Makarios III.
30	April 15–26, 1965	Algeria	Algiers, Laghouat, Constantine, Oran	Held political talks with president Ahmed Ben Bella. After concluding the official visit on 22 April, Tito and his wife stayed few more days in Algeria for private visit.
30	April 26–30, 1965	United Arab Republic	Cairo	Held official political talks with president Nasser.
31	May 10–14, 1965	Norway	Oslo, Institute for Nuclear Energy, Trondheim	Met with King Olav V. Held political talks with prime minister Einar Gerhardsen. Tito awarded the Order of St. Olav.
32	June 2–8, 1965	Czechoslovakia	Prague, Bratislava, Plzeň, Lány, Čenkov	Held official talks with president Antonín Novotný.
32	June 8–13, 1965	East Germany	East Berlin, Dresden, Halle	Held official talks with the Walter Ulbricht, chairman of the State Council. Tito awarded the Grand Star of People's Friendship.
33	June 18 – July 1, 1965	Soviet Union	Moscow, Minsk, Sverdlovsk, Irkutsk, Bratsk Hydroelectric Power Station, Lake Baikal, Omsk, Kolkhoz Chapayeva	Held official talks with the first secretary Leonid Brezhnev, premier Alexei Kosygin and Anastas Mikoyan, chairman of the Presidium of the Supreme Soviet. Tito vacationed at the Lake Baikal. Tito and his wife awarded the Jubilee Medals "Twenty Years of Victory in the Great Patriotic War 1941–1945".
34	September 22–27, 1965	Bulgaria	Sofia, Plovdiv	Held official talks with prime minister Todor Zhivkov.
35	April 18–23, 1966	Romania	Bucharest, Gheorghe Gheorghiu-Dej, Borzești Petrochemical Plant, Timișu, Brașov, Ploiești, Brazi Oil Plant	Participated in the Romanian-Yugoslav friendship meeting with Ceausescu, Stoica and Maurer. Tito awarded the Order of the Star of SR Romania.
36	May 2–7, 1966	United Arab Republic	Alexandria, Tahrir Province	Held official talks with president Nasser.
37	October 19, 1966	Soviet Union	Kiev	Short break while traveling to India.
37	October 20–25, 1966	India	New Delhi	Participated in the tripartite meeting with Indira Gandhi and Gamal Abdel Nasser. Met with president Sarvepalli Radhakrishnan.
37	October 25, 1966	Soviet Union	Tashkent	Short break while traveling back home from India. Met with Sharof Rashidov, first secretary of the Communist Party of Uzbekistan.
38	December 1–3, 1966	Romania	Timișoara, Crișana	Held unofficial talks with the Nicolae Ceaușescu, general secretary of the Romanian Communist Party. Hunting trip to Crișana.
39	January 27 – February 1, 1967	Soviet Union	Chop, Moscow, Podmoskovye	Held unofficial talks with Brezhnev and Alexei Kosygin.
39	February 2–4, 1967	Hungary	Szolnok, Budapest, Telki	Held unofficial talks with János Kádár, first secretary of the Hungarian Socialist Workers' Party.
40	February 13–17, 1967	Austria	Vienna, Graz	Held official talks with president Franz Jonas and chancellor Josef Klaus. Tito awarded the Grand Star of the Decoration of Honour for Services to the Republic of Austria.
41	June 9–10, 1967	Soviet Union	Moscow	Participated in the meeting of the heads of Communist and Workers Parties of Europe.
42	August 10–13, 1967	United Arab Republic	Cairo	Held talks with president Nasser about the crisis in the Middle East.
42	August 13–14, 1967	Syria	Damascus	Held talks with president Nureddin al-Atassi. Met with Salah Jadid, assistant secretary of the Ba'ath Party – Syria Region.
42	August 14–16, 1967	Iraq	Baghdad	Held talks with president Abdul Rahman Arif. Tito awarded the Order of the Two Rivers.
42	August 16–17, 1967	United Arab Republic	Cairo, Alexandria	Tito and Nasser continued their talks.
43	November 1–9, 1967	Soviet Union	Moscow	Headed Yugoslavian delegation at the 50th anniversary of the October Revolution, including the 1967 October Revolution Parade. Tito spoke to the joint session of the Central Committee, Supreme Soviet of the Union and the Supreme Soviet of Russia.
44	January 7–10, 1968	(Kingdom of Afghanistan) Afghanistan	Kabul, Naghlu Dam	Held official talks with king Mohammed Zahir Shah.
44	January 10–17, 1968	Pakistan	Rawalpindi, Islamabad, Lahore, Mirpur Sakro, Dhaka	Held official talks with president Ayub Khan. Tito and Ayub Khanwent to hunting trip to Mirpur Sakro. Tito visited both West and East Pakistan with Ayub Khan.
44	January 17–22, 1968	Cambodia	Phnom Penh, Siem Reap, Angkor Wat	Held official political talks with prince Norodom Sihanouk. Tito awarded the National Order of Independence.
44	January 22–27, 1968	India	New Delhi, Bhopal	Held political talks with prime minister Indira Gandhi. Met with Soviet premier Kosygin. Participated in the tripartite talks with Gandhi and Kosygin. Met with president Zakir Husain.
44	January 27, 1968	South Yemen	Aden	Short break while traveling from India to Ethiopia. Met with president Qahtan Muhammad al-Shaabi.
44	January 27 – February 4, 1968	Ethiopian Empire	Addis Ababa, Baco, Arba Minch,	Held official talks with emperor Haile Selassie.
44	February 4–8, 1968	United Arab Republic	Aswan, Aswan Dam	Hled official talks with president Nasser.
45	April 6–8, 1968	Soviet Union	Novosibirsk, Khabarovsk	Short stops en route to Japan.
45	April 8–15, 1968	Japan	Tokyo, Yokohama, Osaka, Kyoto	Met with emperor Hirohito. Had official talks with prime minister Eisaku Satō. Tito awarded the Grand Cordon of the Order of the Chrysanthemum.
45	April 15–21, 1968	Mongolia	Ulaanbaatar, Ömnögovi Province	Had political talks with the general secretary of the People's Revolutionary Party and prime minister, Yumjaagiin Tsedenbal. Hunting trip to the Ömnögovi Province. Tito awarded the Order of Sukhbaatar.
45	April 21–22, 1968	Soviet Union	Samarkand	Short visit while en route to Iran.
45	April 22–28, 1968	(Pahlavi Iran) Iran	Tehran, Shiraz, Isfahan	Had official political talks with Shah Mohammad Reza Pahlavi and prime minister Amir-Abbas Hoveyda.
45	April 28–30, 1968	Soviet Union	Moscow	Had talks with Leonid Brezhnev.
46	August 9–11, 1968	Czechoslovakia	Prague	Held inter-partisan talks with Alexander Dubček, first secretary of the Communist Party of Czechoslovakia. Met with president Ludvík Svoboda.
47	February 1–2, 1969	Romania	Timișoara	Had talks with Nicolae Ceaușescu.
48	September 20, 1969	Romania	Turnu Severin	Held talks with Ceaușescu. Tito and Ceausescu visited the construction site of the Iron Gate I Hydroelectric Power Station.
49	October 12, 1969	Austria	Bad Radkersburg, Bad Gleichenberg	Met with president Franz Jonas at the opening ceremony of the "Friendship Bridge" over the Mura River on the border between Yugoslavia and Austria. Spent few hours on the Austrian side of the border.
50	November 5–9, 1969	Algeria	Algiers, Oran, Annaba	Held talks with the chairman of the Revolutionary Council, Houari Boumédiène.

== 1970s ==
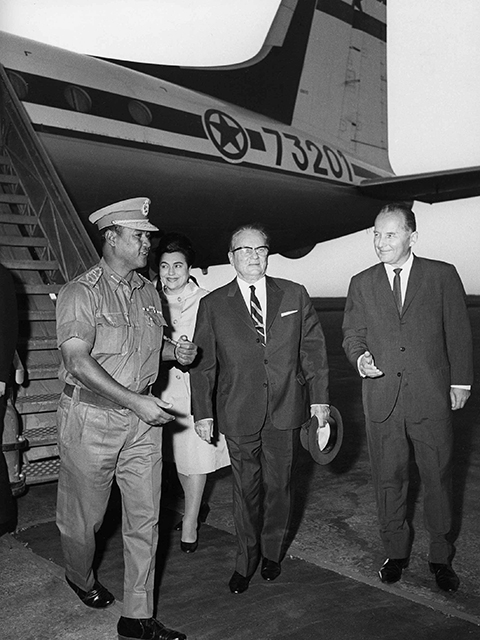
Tito with Nimeiry at the Khartoum Airport, January 1970

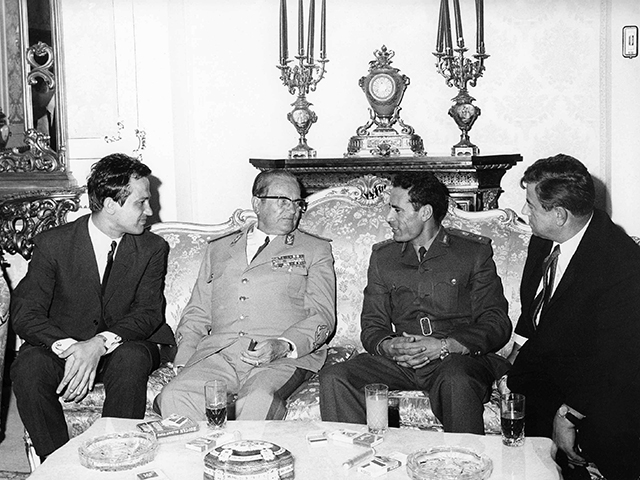
Tito meeting with Gaddafi in Tripoli, February 1970

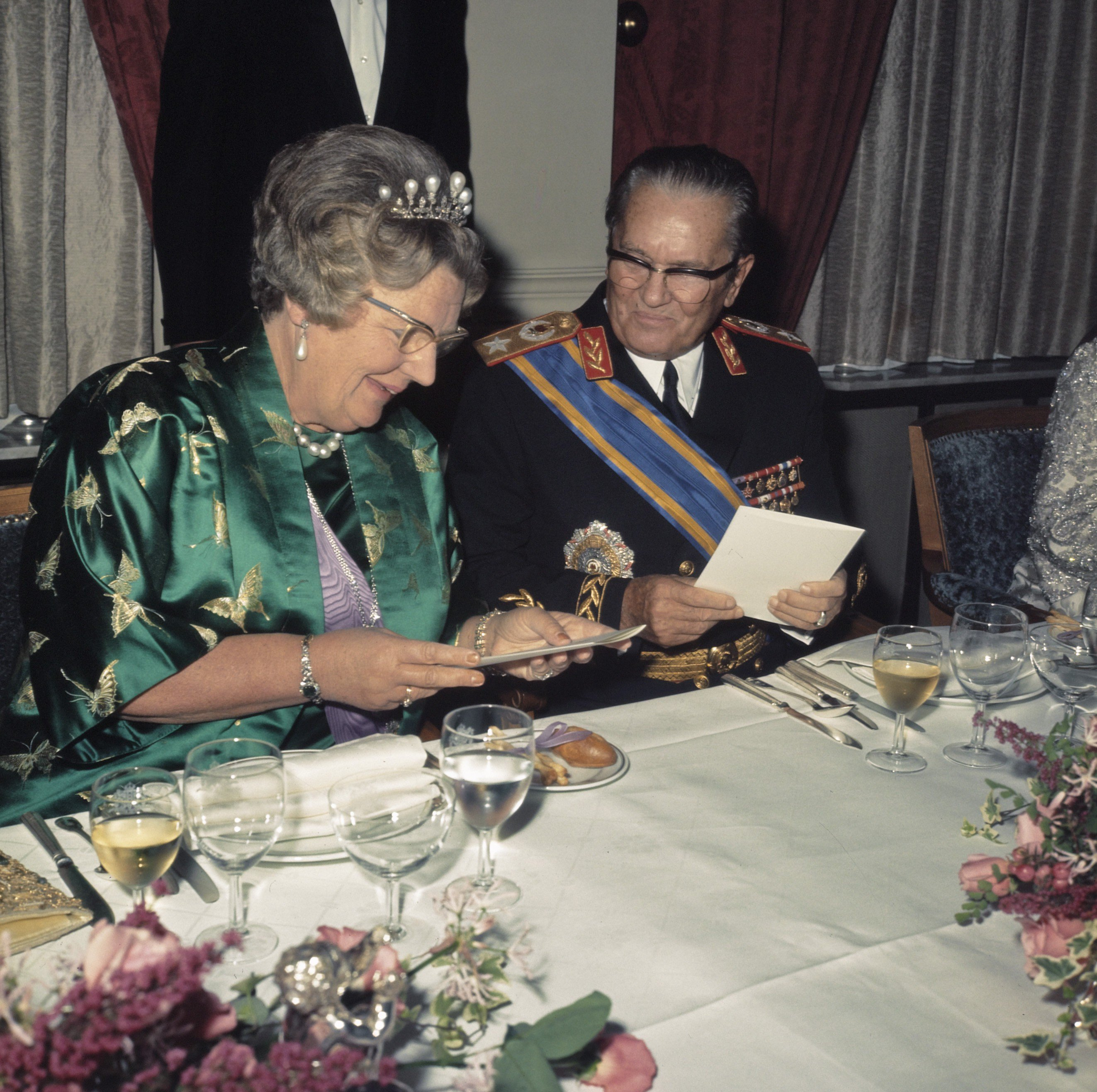
Tito with Queen Juliana of the Netherlands in the Amstel Hotel, Amsterdam, October 1970

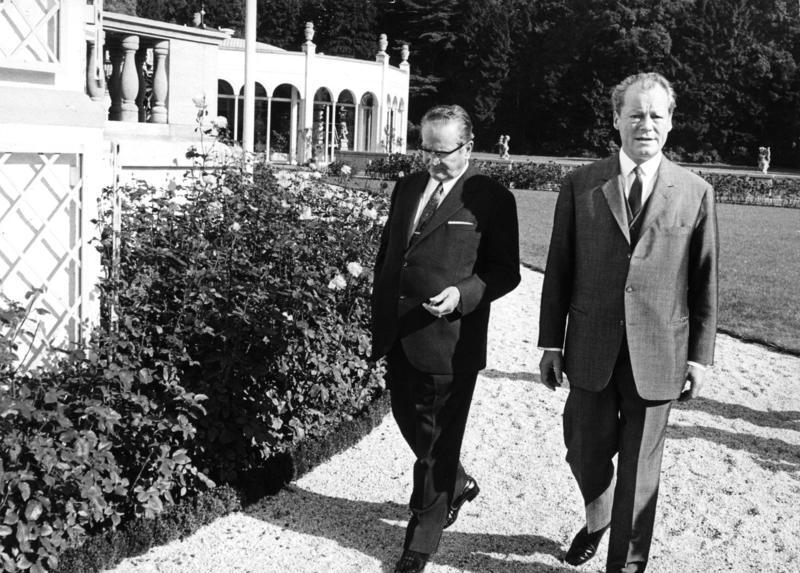
Tito with Willy Brandt in Bonn, October 1970

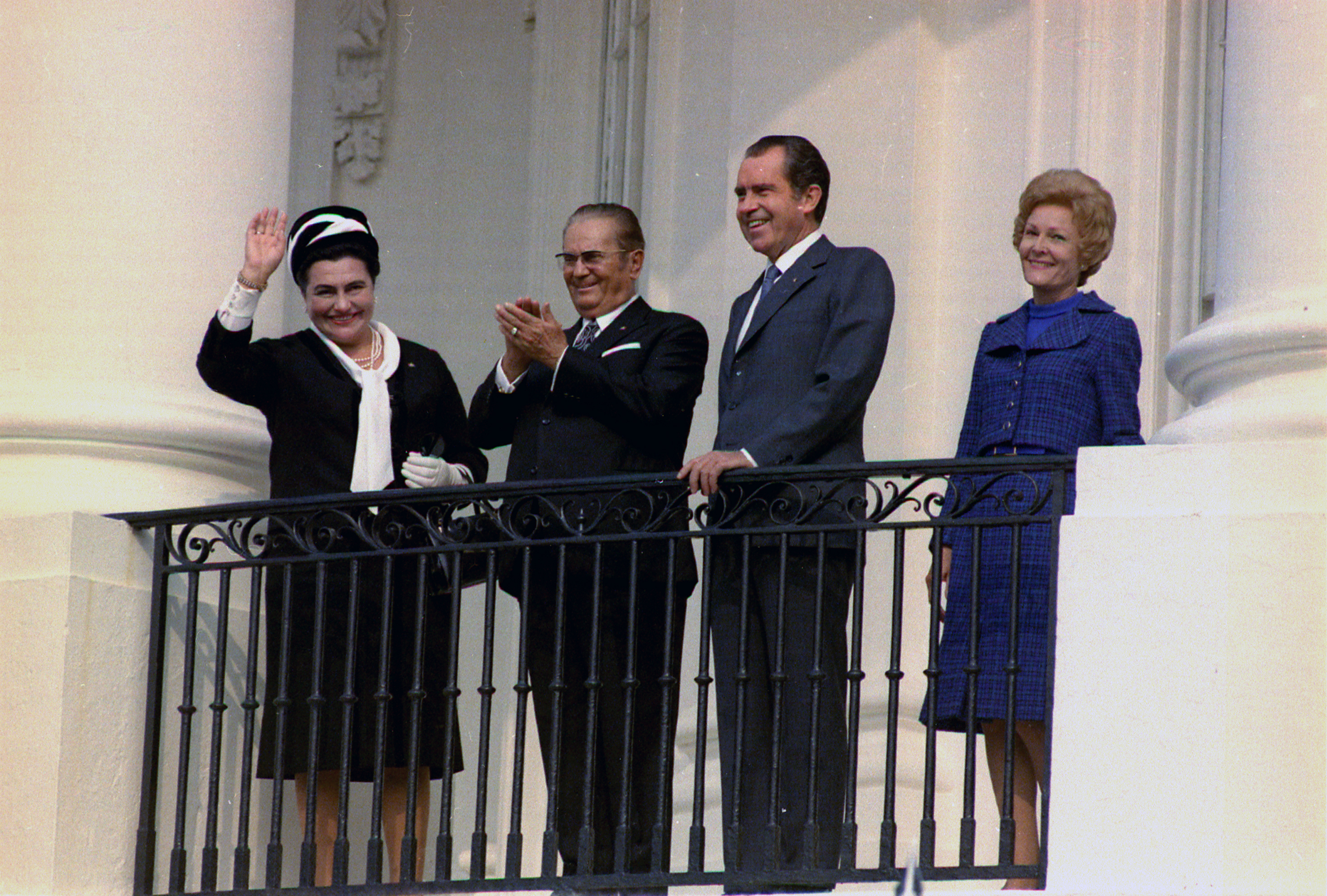
Tito and his wife Jovanka in the White House with US President Richard Nixon and the First Lady Pat Nixon, October 1971

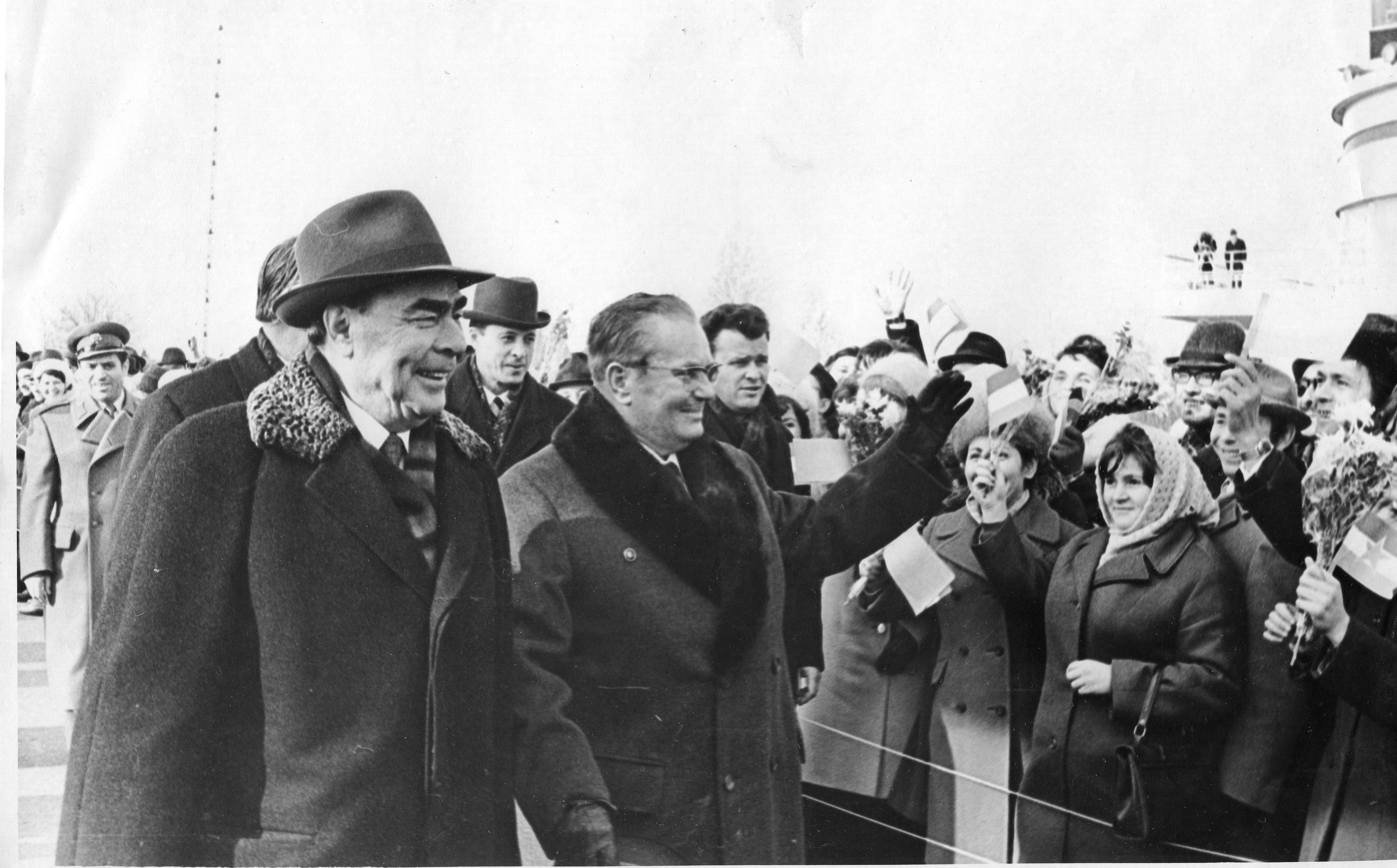
Tito with Leonid Brezhnev in Kiev, November 1973

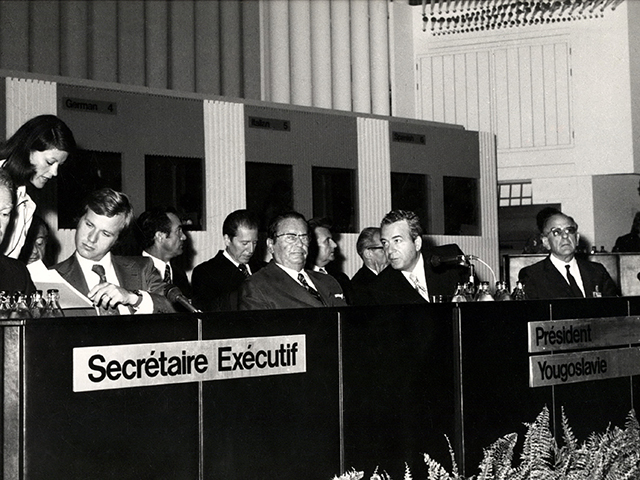
Tito participating in the Conference on Security and Co-operation in Europe, Helsinki, July 1975

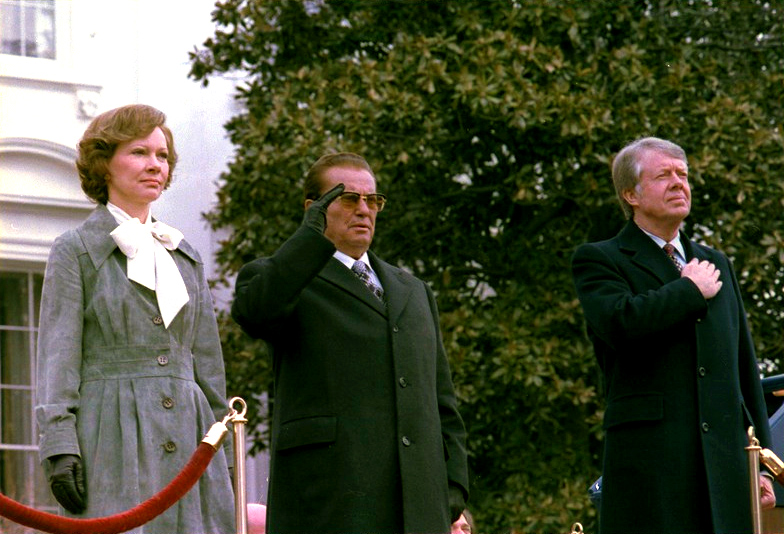
Tito with US President Jimmy Carter and the First Lady Rosalynn Carter at the White House's South Lawn, March 1978

	Dates	Country	Locations	Details
51	January 26, 1970	Sudan	Khartoum	Short visit while traveling to Tanzania. Met with Jaafar Nimeiry, chairman of the National Revolutionary Command Council.
51	January 26 – February 2, 1970	Tanzania	Dar es Salaam, Zanzibar, Lake Manyara, Arusha, Ngorongoro	Held political talks with president Julius Nyerere. Tito spoke at the meeting of the Tanganyika African National Union. Met with Abeid Karume, president of Zanzibar. Met with Agostinho Neto, chairman of the MPLA, Samora Machel, member of the FRELIMO's central committee, and Alfred Baphethuxolo Nzo, secretary general of the ANC.
51	February 2–9, 1970	Zambia	Lusaka, Ndola, Kalulushi, Kitwe, Livingstone, Victoria Falls, Kafue Gorge Power Station	Held official talks with president Kenneth Kaunda. Tito awarded the Order of the Grand Companion of Freedom.
51	February 9–12, 1970	Ethiopian Empire	Addis Ababa	Held official talks with emperor Haile Selassie. Met with Diallo Telli, secretary general of the Organisation of African Unity. Tito met with the William P. Rogers, United States Secretary of State.
51	February 12–20, 1970	Kenya	Nairobi, Keekorok, Nakuru, Thomson's Falls, Nyeri, Mount Kenya	Held official talks with president Jomo Kenyatta. Tito awarded the Order of the Golden Heart.
51	February 20, 1970	Uganda	Entebbe	Short visit while traveling from Kenya to Sudan. Met with president Milton Obote.
51	February 20–23, 1970	Sudan	Khartoum	Held official talks with Jaafar Nimeiry.
51	February 23–25, 1970	United Arab Republic	Aswan, Aswan Dam	Held official talks with president Gamal Abdel Nasser on the situation in the Middle East.
51	February 25–27, 1970	Libya	Tripoli	Held official talks with the Chairman of the Revolutionary Command Council, Muammar Gaddafi.
52	September 6–12, 1970	Zambia	Lusaka	Participated in the 3rd Summit of the Non-Aligned Movement. Met with president Kaunda. Met with Indian primer minister Indira Gandhi. Met with Ethiopian emperor Haile Selassie. Met with Tanzanian president Julius Nyerere. Met with Indonesian president Suharto. Met with Chadian president François Tombalbaye. Met with Burundian president Michel Micombero. Met with Ugandan president Obote. Met with king Mahendra of Nepal. Met with Marien Ngouabi, president of the People's Republic of the Congo.
52	September 12, 1970	Uganda	Entebbe	Short visit while traveling back home from Lusaka. Met with president Obote.
53	October 6–9, 1970	Belgium	Brussels, Antwerp, Geel, Mons	Met with King Baudouin. Tito awarded the Order of Leopold. Held official political talks with prime minister Gaston Eyskens.
53	October 9–11, 1970	Luxembourg	Luxembourg City	Met with Grand Duke Jean. Held official talks with prime minister Pierre Werner.
53	October 11, 1970	West Germany	Bonn	Short visit while traveling back home from Luxembourg. Held talks with chancellor Willy Brandt.
54	October 20–23, 1970	Netherlands	Amsterdam, Delft, Rotterdam, Eindhoven, The Hague	Met with Queen Juliana and Prince Bernhard. Held official talks with prime Minister Piet de Jong.
54	October 23, 1970	France	Paris	Held official talks with president Georges Pompidou and prime minister Jacques Chaban-Delmas.
55	February 14–20, 1971	United Arab Republic	Cairo, Alexandria	Held political talks with president Anwar Sadat.
56	March 25–29, 1971	Italy	Rome, Turin, Pisa	Held political talks with president Giuseppe Saragat and prime minister Emilio Colombo.
56	March 29, 1971	Vatican City		Met with Pope Paul VI.
57	October 13–16, 1971	(Pahlavi Iran) Iran	Persepolis	Met with shah Mohammad Reza Pahlavi and attended the 2,500-year celebration of the Persian Empire. Met with Nikolai Podgorny, Chairman of the Presidium of the Supreme Soviet of the USSR. Met with Ethiopian emperor Haile Selassie. Met with Czechoslovak president Svoboda, Romanian secretary-genera Ceaușescu, and Finnish president Kekkonen.
57	October 16–20, 1971	India	New Delhi	Met with president V. V. Giri. Held political talks with prime minister Indira Gandhi.
57	October 20–21, 1971	Egypt	Cairo	Held official talks with president Anwar Sadat.
58	October 27 – November 2, 1971	United States	Camp David, Washington, D.C., Houston, Palm Springs, Los Angeles, Long Beach	Made short breaks at Prestwick Airport (Scotland) and Gander International Airport (Canada) while traveling to the US. Met with president Richard Nixon.
58	November 2–7, 1971	Canada	Ottawa, Quebec City, Halifax	Met with governor-general Roland Michener. Held talks with prime minister Pierre Trudeau.
58	November 7–8, 1971	United Kingdom	Chequers; London	Met with Queen Elizabeth II. Held talks with prime minister Edward Heath.
59	November 23–24, 1971	Romania	Timișoara	Held political talks with Nicolae Ceaușescu.
60	May 16, 1972	Romania	Iron Gates, Drobeta-Turnu Severin	Met with Nicolae Ceaușescu, celebrating the opening of the Iron Gate I Hydroelectric Power Station. Tito awarded the title of the Hero of the Socialist Republic of Romania and the Order of Victory of Socialism.
60	May 17, 1972	Romania	Orșova	Met with Nicolae Ceaușescu, celebrating the opening of the Iron Gate I Hydroelectric Power Station. Tito awarded the title of the Hero of the Socialist Republic of Romania and the Order of Victory of Socialism.
61	June 5–10, 1972	Soviet Union	Moscow, Riga, Jūrmala	Held talks with Leonid Brezhnev.
62	June 19–23, 1972	Poland	Warsaw, Łańsk	Held political talks with Edward Gierek, the First Secretary of the Polish United Workers' Party Met with the Chairman of the Council of State, Henryk Jabłoński.
63	September 2–10, 1973	Algeria	Algiers	Participated in the 4th Summit of the Non-Aligned Movement. Met with president Boumediene. Met with Mauritanian president Daddah. Met with Norodom Sihanouk. Met with Zambian president Kaunda. Meth with Ethiopian emperor Haile Selassie. Met with Sri Lankan prime minister Bandaranaike. Meth with Zairian president Mobutu. Met with Tunisian president Bourguiba. Met with Yasser Arafat, leader of the PLO. Met with Malaysian prime minister Abdul Razak Hussein. Met with Nigerien president Hamani Diori and Mauritian prime minister Seewoosagur Ramgoolam. Met with Gabonese president Bongo. Met with Aristides Pereira, secretary-general of the PAIGC. Met with Sam Nujoma, leader of the SWAPO. Met with Cuban prime minister Fidel Castro. Met with Moroccan prime minister Ahmed Osman. Met with Bangladeshi prime minister Mujibur Rahman. Met with Ugandan president Idi Amin. Met with Tanzanian president Nyerere.
64	November 12–15, 1973	Soviet Union	Kiev	Held political talks with Leonid Brezhnev.
65	January 24–29, 1974	India	New Delhi	Met with president V. V. Giri. Held official talks with prime minister Indira Gandhi. Met with Sri Lankan prime minister Sirimavo Bandaranaike. Tito awarded the Jawaharlal Nehru Award.
65	January 29 – February 2, 1974	Bangladesh	Dhaka, Savar, Ganges Delta	Met with president Mohammad Mohammadullah. Held official talks with prime minister Sheikh Mujibur Rahman. Tito spoke to the Bangladeshi parliament.
65	February 2–5, 1974	(Kingdom of Nepal) Nepal	Kathmandu, Bhaktapur	Met with king Birendra. Met with prime minister Nagendra Prasad Rijal. Tito awarded the Order of Ojaswi Rajanya.
65	February 5–7, 1974	Syria	Damascus	Held official political talks with president Hafez al-Assad.
66	April 27–28, 1974	Hungary	Budapest, Telki	Held political talks with János Kádár.
67	June 24–27, 1974	West Germany	Bonn, Düsseldorf, Hamburg	Held official talks with president Gustav Heinemann and chancellor Helmut Schmidt.
68	July 8–11, 1974	Romania	Bucharest, Constanța, Neptun	Held official political talks with Ceaușescu and prime minister Manea Mănescu.
69	October 29 – November 1, 1974	Denmark	Copenhagen, Kronborg, Roskilde	Met with Queen Margrethe II. Tito awarded the Order of the Elephant. Held official talks with prime minister Poul Hartling.
70	November 12–15, 1974	East Germany	East Berlin, Marzahn, Leipzig	Held official political talks with Erich Honecker, first secretary of the Socialist Unity Party of Germany. Met with Willi Stoph, chairman of the State Council, and prime minister Horst Sindermann. Tito awarded the Order of Karl Marx.
71	March 10–13, 1975	Poland	Rzeszów, Arłamów	Held political talks with Edward Gierek. Tito and Gierek hunted bisons and wild boars near Arłamów.
72	July 29 – August 2, 1975	Finland	Helsinki	Participated in the Conference on Security and Co-operation in Europe and signed Helsinki Accords. Met with Cypriot president Makarios. Met with West German chancellor Schmidt. Met with Erich Honecker, first secretary of the Socialist Unity Party of Germany. Met with Finnish president Kekkonen. Met with Soviet general secretary Brezhnev. Met with Todor Zhivkov, president of the Bulgarian State Council. Met with Danish prime minister Jørgensen. Met with Edward Gierek, first secretary of the Polish United Workers' Party. Met with Dutch prime minister Den Uyl. Met with Greek prime minister Karamanlis. Met with British prime minister Wilson. Met with French president Giscard d'Estaing. MEt with Portuguese president Costa Gomes. Met with Romanian president Ceaușescu. Met with Czechoslovak president Husák.
73	March 9, 1976	Portugal	Santa Maria Island	Made a one-hour break while traveling to Mexico.
73	March 9–10, 1976	Bermuda	Hamilton	Made a break while traveling to Mexico. Met with governor Edwin Leather and premier John Henry Sharpe.
73	March 10–14, 1976	Mexico	Veracruz, Cancún, Tulum	Held official political talks with president Luis Echeverría.
73	March 14–17, 1976	Panama	Panama City	Met with president Demetrio B. Lakas. Held official political talks with Omar Torrijos.
73	March 17–19, 1976	Venezuela	Caracas	Held political talks with president Carlos Andrés Pérez. Tito spoke to the National Congress of Venezuela.
73	March 19–20, 1976	Bermuda	Hamilton	Made a break while traveling back to Europe. Met with governor Leather.
73	March 20–22, 1976	Portugal	Vale do Lobo	Held unofficial talks with president Francisco da Costa Gomes.
74	March 29 – April 1, 1976	Sweden	Stockholm	Met with king Carl XVI Gustaf. Held political talks with prime ministar Olof Palme.
75	May 10–13, 1976	Greece	Athens, Sounion	Met with president Konstantinos Tsatsos. Held official talks with prime minister Konstantinos Karamanlis.
76	June 8–11, 1976	Turkey	Ankara, İzmir, Ephesus	Held official political talks with president Fahri Korutürk. Met with prime minister Süleyman Demirel.
77	June 27 – July 1, 1976	East Germany	East Berlin	Participated in the 1976 Conference of Communist and Workers Parties of Europe. Met with Erich Honecker, first secretary of the SED. Met with Soviet general secretary Brezhnev. Met with Romanian president Ceaușescu. Met with Edward Gierek, first secretary of the Polish United Workers' Party. Met with János Kádár, general secretary of the Hungarian Socialist Workers' Party.
78	August 13, 1976	United Arab Emirates	Abu Dhabi	Spent an hour in Abu Dhabi en route to Colombo. Met with crown prince Khalifa bin Zayed Al Nahyan.
78	August 13–22, 1976	Sri Lanka	Colombo	Participated in the 5th Summit of the Non-Aligned Movement. Met with North Korean premier Pak Song-chol. Met with Zambian president Kaunda. Met with Khieu Samphan, president of the Democratic Kampuchea, and Cypriot president Makarios. Met with Mauritanian president Daddah. Met with Iraqi vice-president Marouf. Met with king Birendra of Nepal and Egyptian president Sadat. Met with Indian prime minister Indira Gandhi. Met with Syrian president Assad. Met with Algerian president Boumédiène. Met with UN secretary-general Waldheim. Met with Panamanian prime minister Torrijos. Met with Afghani president Daoud Khan. Met with Angolan president Neto. Met with North Yemeni president Ibrahim al-Hamdi. Met with Tanzanian vice-president Jumbe. Met with Ethiopian president Tafari Benti. Met with Muammar Gaddafi, chairman of the Revolutionary Council of Libya. Met with Sri Lankan prime minister Bandaranaike.
79	January 18–20, 1977	Libya	Tripoli, Garabulli	Tito held official talks with Muammar Gaddafi. After attending the send-off of Tito's airplane from Batajnica Air Base to Libya, the prime minister of Yugoslavia Džemal Bijedić died in an airplane crash en route to Sarajevo.
80	August 16–24, 1977	Soviet Union	Moscow, Irkutsk, Listvyanka	Held official talks with Leonid Brezhnev. Tito awarded the Order of the October Revolution. After official visit to Moscow, Tito vacationed at the Lake Baikal.
80	August 24–30, 1977	North Korea	Pyongyang, Lake Yonpung near Anju	Held official political talks with president Kim Il Sung. Tito awarded the Order of the Hero of the Korean People's Republic.
80	August 30 – September 8, 1977	People's Republic of China	Beijing, Great Wall of China, Hangzhou, Shanghai, Ürümqi	Held political talks with the chairman of the Communist Party and premier, Hua Guofeng.
80	September 8, 1977	(Pahlavi Iran) Iran	Tehran	Short visit while traveling back home from China. Met with Shah Mohammad Reza Pahlavi.
81	October 12–17, 1977	France	Paris, Eugénie-les-Bains	Held official talks with president Valéry Giscard d'Estaing. After finishing his official visit, Tito stayed two more days in Eugénie-les-Bains on vacation.
81	October 17–20, 1977	Portugal	Lisbon	Held official talks with president António Ramalho Eanes. Met with prime minister Mário Soares. Tito awarded the Grand Collar of the Military Order of Saint James of the Sword.
81	October 20–21, 1977	Algeria	Algiers	Held unofficial talks with President Houari Boumédiène.
82	December 3–4, 1977	Romania	Ostrovu Mare Island, Drobeta-Turnu Severin	Met with Nicolae Ceaușescu, dedicated memorial plaque at the Iron Gate II Hydroelectric Power Station.
83	March 6, 1978	Ireland	Shannon Airport	One-hour break while traveling to the United States. Met with foreign minister Michael O'Kennedy.
83	March 6, 1978	Canada	Gander Airport	One-hour break while traveling to the United States.
83	March 6–9, 1978	United States	Washington, D.C.,	Held official talks with president Jimmy Carter.
83	March 10–11, 1978	United Kingdom	London	Met with queen Elizabeth II. Held official talks with prime minister James Callaghan.
84	February 1–4, 1979	Kuwait	Kuwait City	Met with emir Jaber Al-Ahmad Al-Sabah. Had talks with prime minister and crown prince Saad Al-Salim Al-Sabah.
84	February 4–8, 1979	Iraq	Baghdad	Held official talks with the Chairman of the Revolutionary Command Council, Ahmed Hassan al-Bakr. Met with Saddam Hussein, vice-chairman of the Revolutionary Command Council. Met with vice-president Taha Muhie-eldin Marouf. Tito awarded the Military Order of the Two Rivers.
84	February 8–11, 1979	Syria	Damascus	Hald official talks with president Assad. Tito met with Yasser Arafat, leader of the PLO.
84	February 11–12, 1979	Jordan	Amman	Met with King Hussein. Tito awarded the Order of Al-Hussein bin Ali. Visit cut short because of the funeral of Edvard Kardelj.
85	May 16–21, 1979	Soviet Union	Moscow, Star City	Held official talks with Leonid Brezhnev.
86	May 28–31, 1979	Algeria	Algiers	Held official talks with president Chadli Bendjedid. Met with Sam Nujoma, president of SWAPO.
86	May 31 – June 3, 1979	Libya	Tripoli	Held official talks with Muammar Gaddafi.
86	June 3–5, 1979	Malta	Verdala Palace, Valletta	Met with president Anton Buttigieg. Held official talks with prime minister Dom Mintoff.
87	August 29, 1979	Ireland	Shannon Airport	One-hour break while traveling to Cuba.
87	August 29, 1979	Canada	Gander Airport	One-hour break while traveling to Cuba.
87	August 29 – September 9, 1979	Cuba	Havana	Met with president Fidel Castro. Participated in the 6th Summit of the Non-Aligned Movement. Met with Iraqi president Hussein. Met with Sri Lankan president J. R. Jayewardene. Met with Ethiopian leader Mengistu Haile Mariam. Met with Indonesian vice-president Adam Malik. Met with Zambian president Kaunda. Met with Pakistani president Muhammad Zia-ul-Haq. Met with Syrian president Assad. Met with Bangladeshi president Ziaur Rahman. Met with Algerian president Bendjedid. Met with UN secretary-general Waldheim. Met with Peruvian president Francisco Morales Bermúdez. Met with Cypriot president Spyros Kyprianou. Met with king Birendra of Nepal. Met with Guinean president Sékou Touré. Met with Tanzanian president Nyerere. Met with Yasser Arafat, leader of the PLO. Met with North Korean premier Ri Jong-ok. Met with Malian president Moussa Traoré. Met with Jamaican prime minister Michael Manley. Met with Guyanese prime minister Forbes Burnham. Met with king Hussein of Jordan. Tito made short breaks at Shannon and Gander while returning home.
88	November 2–4, 1979	Romania	Bucharest	Held official political talks with Nicolae Ceaușescu. Signed joint Yugoslavian-Romanian declaration.
