= Tanzania and the Non-Aligned Movement =

Tanzania is an active and prominent member state of the Non-Aligned Movement since the days of independence of Tanganyika in 1961. In early days of the movement President Julius Nyerere was recognized as one of the leading figures in the movement and among Third World leaders in general. His government promoted close adherence to non-alignment principles in which Global North and Global South division was more important than Cold War East–West dichotomy, supported African cooperation, engaged in a strong criticism of superpower intrusion in African affairs and supported the establishment of the New International Economic Order.

While Tanganyika was still not independent at the time of the 1st Summit of the Non-Aligned Movement Nyerere made a symbolic trip to the host city of Belgrade, capital of SFR Yugoslavia that same year which reaffirmed Tanganyikan intention to pursue future non-aligned policy. Tanzania played a particularly active role in the movement on regional and international issues during the Cold War period. At that time country was elected member of the NAM Coordinating Bureau at the United Nations playing important role in movement's coordinated efforts in that body and was elected as well as the Chair of the Drafting Committee ahead of the 1972 Non-Aligned Foreign Ministers Conference and 5th Summit of the Non-Aligned Movement in 1976.

In 1970 Tanzania hosted Preparatory Meeting of the Non-Alignment Countries in Dar es Salaam ahead of the 3rd Summit of the Non-Aligned Movement in Lusaka, Zambia. Country's active participation in the work of the NAM significantly decreased from 1990s onwards.

== Gallery ==
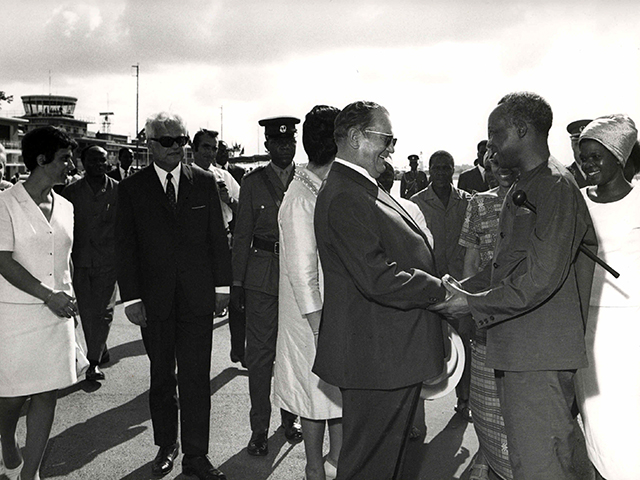
President of Yugoslavia Josip Broz Tito and President Nyerere at the Dar es Salaam International Airport in 1970

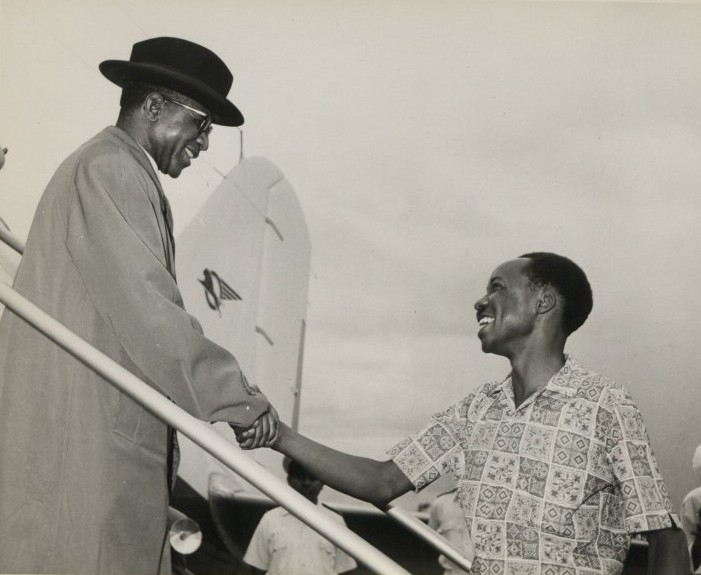
Malawi's Prime Minister Hastings Kamuzu Banda arrival to Tanganyika

== See also ==
- India and the Non-Aligned Movement
- Yugoslavia and the Non-Aligned Movement
- Egypt and the Non-Aligned Movement
- Sri Lanka and the Non-Aligned Movement
