= List of international presidential trips made by Anwar Sadat =

The following is a list of international trips made by Egyptian President Anwar Sadat during his presidency from 1970 to 1981.

== 1971 ==
No.	Date	Country	Areas visited	Details	Ref.
	20 March	Libya			
	15–17 April	Libya	Benghazi	Establishment of the Federation of Arab Republics between Egypt, Libya, and Syria, effective 1 January 1972	
	11–13 October	Soviet Union	Moscow		

== 1972 ==
No.	Date	Country	Areas visited	Details	Ref.
	2 February	Soviet Union	Moscow		
	15 March	Sudan	Khartoum	Met with President Gaafar Nimeiry	
	6–8 May	Tunisia	Tunis	Met with President Habib Bourguiba	

== 1973 ==
No.	Date	Country	Areas visited	Details	Ref.
	January	Libya			
	11 January	Yugoslavia		Met with President Josip Tito	
	10–14 June	Libya	Tripoli		
	23–27 August	Saudi Arabia	Jeddah	Met with King Faisal	
	23–27 August	Qatar	Doha	Met with Sheikh Khalifa bin Hamad Al Thani	
	23–27 August	Syria	Damascus	Met with President Hafez al-Assad	
	5–9 September	Algeria	Algiers	4th Summit of the Non-Aligned Movement	

== 1974 ==
No.	Date	Country	Areas visited	Details	Ref.
	20 January	Qatar	Doha		
	21 January	United Arab Emirates	Abu Dhabi		
	21 January	Algeria			
	20 February	Saudi Arabia			
	22 February	Pakistan	Lahore		
	25 February	India	New Delhi		
	25 February	Bangladesh	Dhaka		

== 1975 ==
No.	Date	Country	Areas visited	Details	Ref.
	27–29 January	France	Paris		
	13 May	Kuwait	Kuwait City		
	16 May	Jordan	Amman		
	17 May	Syria	Damascus		
	20 May	Iraq	Baghdad		
	1 June	Austria	Salzburg, Vienna		
	27 October–5 November	United States	Jacksonville, Williamsburg, New York City, Chicago, and Houston	Met with President Gerald Ford. Addressed a joint session of Congress	
	6–8 November	United Kingdom	London		

== 1976 ==
No.	Date	Country	Areas visited	Details	Ref.
	26 February	Oman	Muscat	Met with Sultan Qaboos	
	April	Italy	Rome	Met with President Giovanni Leone	
	8 April	Vatican City			
	8 April	Yugoslavia	Brioni	Met with President Josip Tito	

== 1977 ==
No.	Date	Country	Areas visited	Details	Ref.
	31 March	West Germany	Bonn	Met with President Walter Scheel	
	3–6 April	United States			
	October	Iran	Tehran		
	16–17 November	Syria	Damascus	Met with President Hafez al-Assad for talks about his trip to Israel	
	19–21 November	Israel	West Jerusalem	Met with Prime Minister Menachem Begin, and President Ephraim Katzir. Advance the peace process and address the Knesset	
	19–21 November	Palestine	East Jerusalem; Bethlehem	Prayed at Al-Aqsa Mosque in Jerusalem	

== 1978 ==
No.	Date	Country	Areas visited	Details	Ref.
	7 January	Sudan	Khartoum	Met with President Gaafar Nimeiry	
	2 February	Morocco	Rabat		
	3–8 February	United States			
	9 February	United Kingdom	London		
	11 July	Austria	Salzburg		
	5–19 September	United States	Camp David; Gettysburg	Camp David Accords	

== 1979 ==
No.	Date	Country	Areas visited	Details	Ref.
	24–29 March	United States	Washington D.C.	Egypt–Israel peace treaty	
	17–22 July	Liberia	Monrovia	Attended OAU summit	
	4 September	Israel	Haifa		

== 1980 ==
No.	Date	Country	Areas visited	Details	Ref.
	7–10 April	United States		Met with President Jimmy Carter	

== 1981 ==
No.	Date	Country	Areas visited	Details	Ref.
	4–9 August	United States	Washington D.C.	Met with President Ronald Reagan	
