= Sri Lanka and the Non-Aligned Movement =

Sri Lanka is one of the founding members of the Non-Aligned Movement. Principles of Non-Alignment and participation in movement's activities is of high priority in foreign policy of the country.

Its capital of Colombo hosted the 5th Summit of the Non-Aligned Movement on 16–19 August 1976. The country proposed its bid to host the summit at the 1973 Non-Aligned Standing Committee Conference in Kabul. Following the 1976 Summit Sri Lanka held the chairmanship of the movement for three years until 1979. This role represented the pinnacle of Sri Lankan foreign policy in the period of Cold War.

== History ==
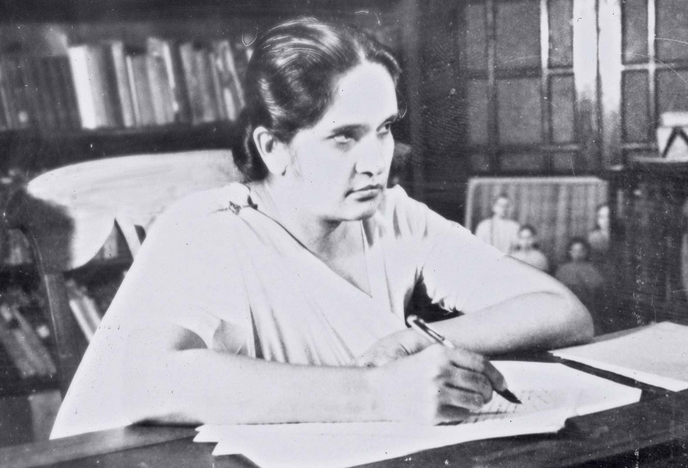
Sirimavo Bandaranaike

Ahead of the 2nd Summit of the Non-Aligned Movement Indonesia and China strongly criticized the idea of the Non-Aligned conference as counterproductive to Bandung which motivated Prime Minister of Sri Lanka Sirimavo Bandaranaike to confront those criticisms by stressing indivisibility of the World peace.

On 16–19 August 1976 in Colombo hosted the 5th Summit of the Non-Aligned Movement with 86 nations participated in the summit with additional 30 observers and guests representing all the continents in the world. The logo of the conference included references to five values of self-determination, economic development, peace and security, solidarity and the denial of colonialism and imperialism. The Government of Sri Lanka declared the public holiday to enable residents in the capital city to get to the street and see and greet foreign guests.

At the time of 6th Summit of the Non-Aligned Movement in Havana, delegation of Sri Lanka expressed the concern that due to the host's sectarianism his opening speech was deficient in showing appropriate level of statecraft. In 2021, during his participation in 60th Anniversary Additional Commemorative Non-Aligned Meeting in Belgrade, Tharaka Balasuriya reaffirmed his country's continued commitment to principles and goals of the movement.

== See also ==
- India and the Non-Aligned Movement
- Yugoslavia and the Non-Aligned Movement
- Egypt and the Non-Aligned Movement
- Bandaranaike Memorial International Conference Hall
