= Cuba–Yugoslavia relations =

- Cuba: Yugoslavia

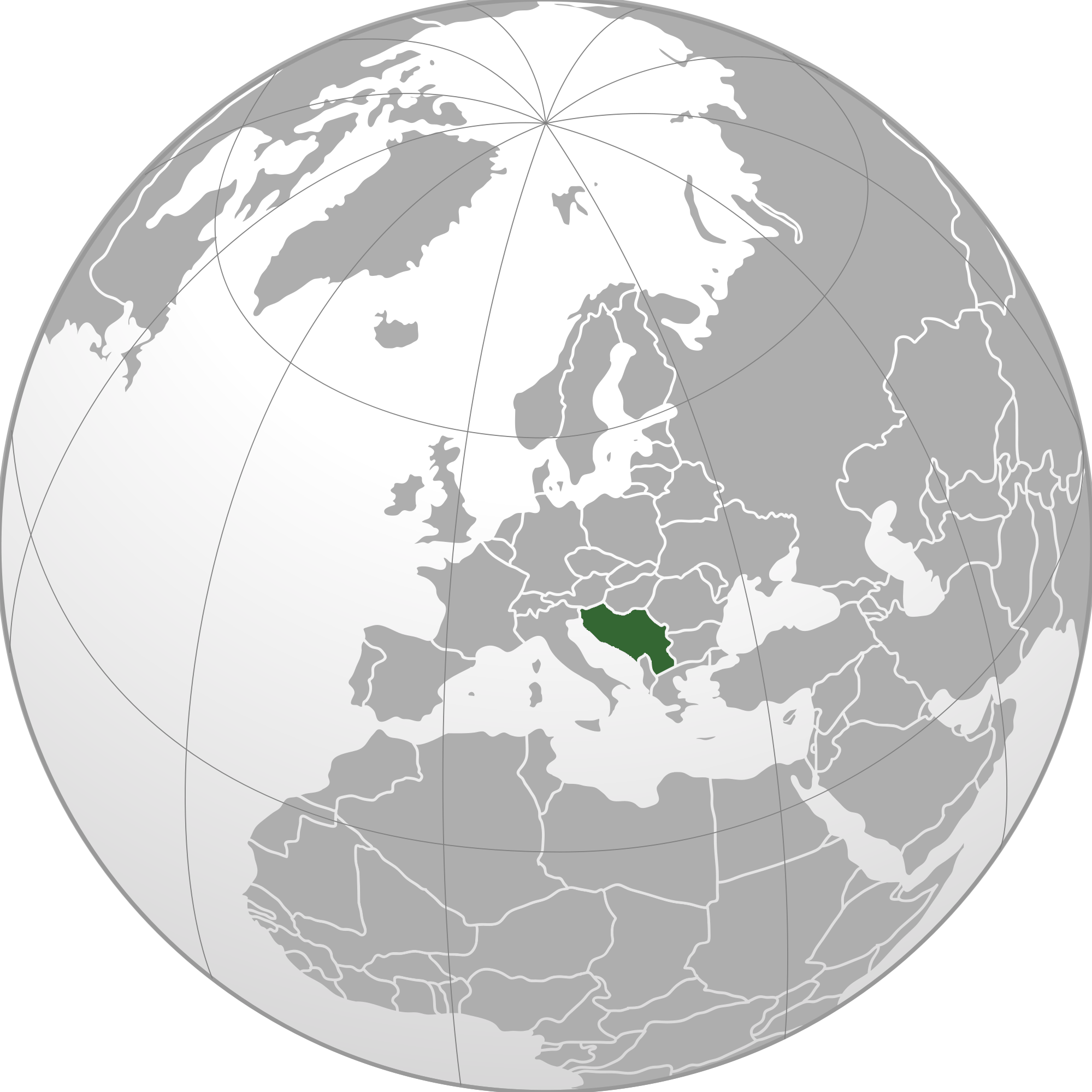
Cuba and Yugoslavia

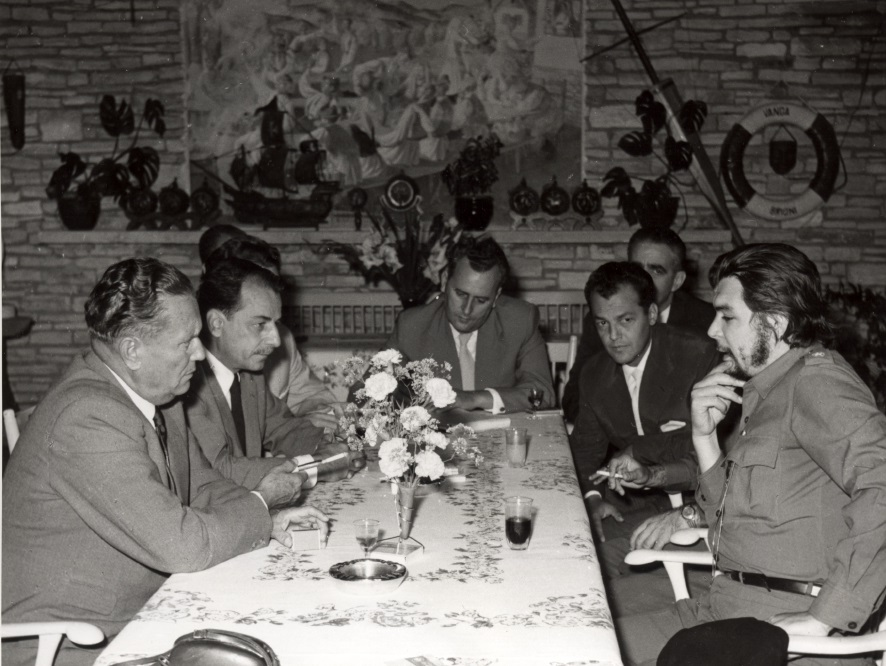
Josip Broz Tito, Koča Popović and Che Guevara on Brijuni islands in 1959.

Cuba–Yugoslavia relations were historical foreign relations between Cuba and now split-up Socialist Federal Republic of Yugoslavia. Official diplomatic relations were established in 1943 when the Yugoslav government-in-exile decided to upgrade its consulate into an official representation office.

During the Cold War both countries actively participated in the work of the Non-Aligned Movement in which they belonged to different informal sub-groupings and often disagreed on the common policies of the movement. Cuba associated mostly with self-described progressive members which advocated for what they perceived as natural identity of interest between Soviet socialism and colonial people of Africa and Asia. Post 1948 Tito-Stalin split Yugoslavia on the other hand identified with self-described movement's core members which insisted on strict equidistance towards both blocs. Both approaches aimed to achieve strategic independence from one or the other superpower. This disagreement reached its peak at the time of the 1979 Summit in Havana.

Despite significant disagreements on the question of Soviet strategic alliance and competition for influence within the movement, both countries insisted on maintaining courteous and close relations on the level of state protocol. On his goodwill mission to Afro-Asian countries and Yugoslavia Che Guevara visited Belgrade, Kragujevac, Sarajevo, Rijeka, Opatija and Brijuni islands in 1959, eight months after the Cuban revolution. Fidel Castro visited Yugoslavia in 1976. President of Yugoslavia Josip Broz Tito visited Havana at the time of 1979 Non-Aligned Summit which was his last international trip.

== See also ==
- Yugoslavia and the Non-Aligned Movement
- Cuba–Serbia relations
