= 1973 Non-Aligned Standing Committee Conference =

Non-Aligned Standing Committee Conference
- Host country: Kingdom of Afghanistan
- Date: May 13, 1973-May 15, 1973
- Cities: Kabul
- Chair: Mohammad Zahir Shah (King of Afghanistan)

1973 Non-Aligned Movement Standing Committee Conference took place on 13–15 May 1973 in Kabul, the capital city of Afghanistan. The country had participated in the work of the movement since the 1st Summit of the Non-Aligned Movement in Belgrade in 1961. Afghanistan perceived non-alignment as a guarantee of peace in independence in the context of the country sharing a long border with both the Soviet Union and CENTO member states. The 1973 meeting was opened by the Minister of Foreign Affairs of Afghanistan Mohammad Musa Shafiq. Whilst serving as the host country, Afghanistan decided to play a marginal role in the meeting, concerned about how a more prominent role may be perceived by major powers.

Sri Lanka proposed Colombo as the host of the 5th Summit of the Non-Aligned Movement, which was strongly supported by SFR Yugoslavia. Panama joined the NAM as an observer, while Bangladesh, despite reservations by Pakistan, joined as a full member state. Yugoslavia supported unofficial interest by Australia and North Korea to attend the next meeting with observer status. India, Guyana and Yugoslavia played an active role in preparing the working materials for the following summit in Algeria. Chile proposed discussion on measures against global corporate threats and measures to protect sovereign control over natural resources. In July 1973, Afghanistan was faced with a coup d'état, after which the new authorities stated their intention to maintain country's non-aligned position.

== See also ==
- 4th Summit of the Non-Aligned Movement
- Finlandization
