= 1970 Preparatory Meeting of the Non-Alignment Countries, Dar es Salaam =

- Host country: Tanzania
- Date: 13–17 April 1970
- Cities: Dar es Salaam
- Chair: Julius Nyerere (President of Tanzania)

1970 Preparatory Meeting of the Non-Alignment Countries which took place on 13–17 April in Dar es Salaam, Tanzania was the first of three preparatory meetings (the second yaking place in New Delhi in June 1970 and the third in Lusaka in July 1970) ahead of the 3rd Summit of the Non-Aligned Movement in Lusaka, Zambia later that year. The meeting was held to select the host country for the next summit, as multiple member states had expressed their interest. At the meeting, the countries formally interested in hosting were Ethiopia, India, Morocco and Algeria. Arab countries pressured Ethiopia to drop its application, after which Addis Ababa strongly advocated for Zambia. Zambia received 29 votes, whereas Algeria received 23. President of Tanzania Julius Nyerere used the opportunity to underline that, if the concept of nonalignment is to retain its relevance, it must include a clear economic aspect of cooperation.

== See also ==
- Foreign relations of Tanzania
- Tanzania and the Non-Aligned Movement
