= Cuba–Serbia relations =

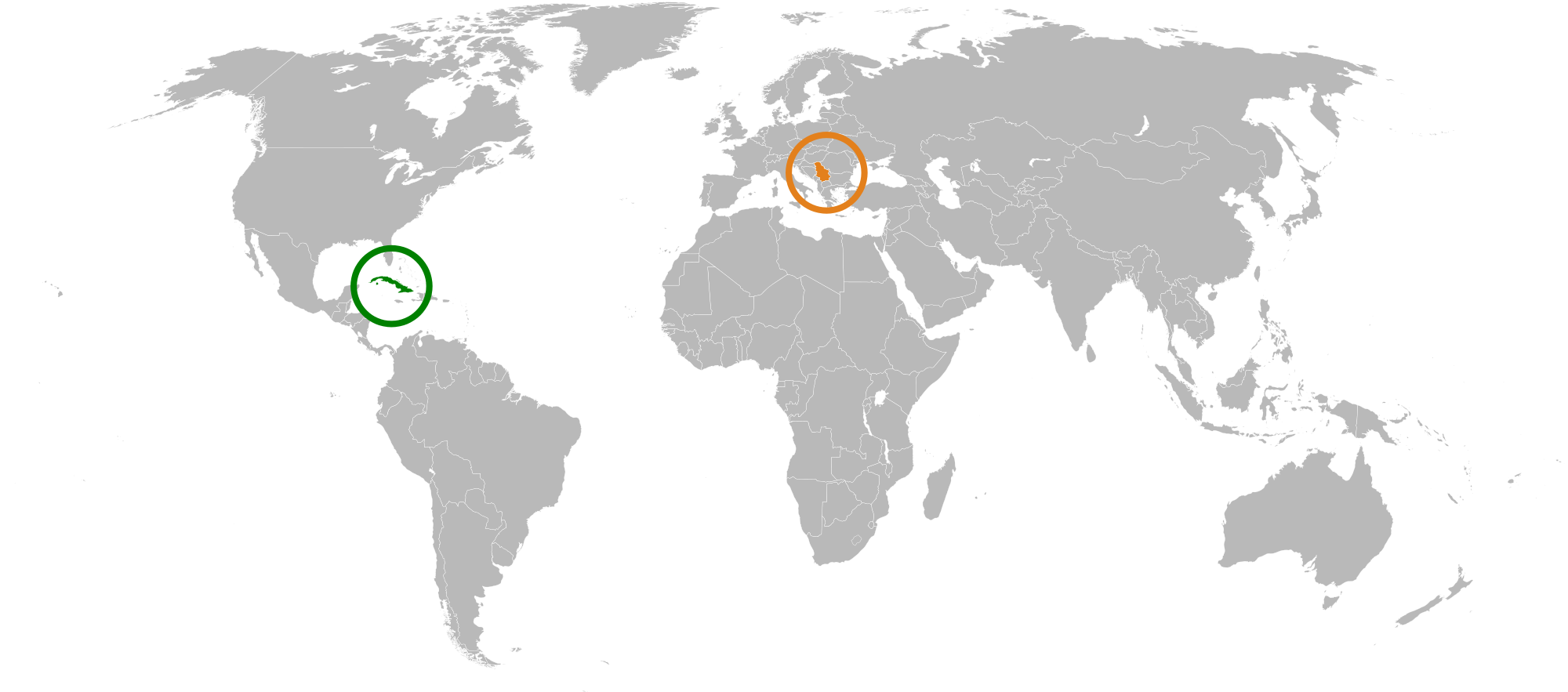

- Cuba: Serbia

Cuba and Serbia maintain diplomatic relations established in 1902. From 1918 to 2006, Cuba maintained relations with the Kingdom of Yugoslavia, the Socialist Federal Republic of Yugoslavia (SFRY), and the Federal Republic of Yugoslavia (FRY) (later Serbia and Montenegro), of which Serbia is considered shared (SFRY) or sole (FRY) legal successor.

== Political relations ==
In the National Assembly of Serbia there is an active parliamentary group of friendship with Cuba. Serbia supports Cuba at the United Nations in condemning the United States embargo.

=== Cuba's stance on Kosovo ===
Cuba has supported Serbia in its stance towards Kosovo, considering Kosovo independence an "illegitimate act" and a "violation of norms of international law and principles of the United Nations Charter".

== Resident diplomatic missions ==
- Cuba has an embassy in Belgrade.
- Serbia has an embassy in Havana.

== See also ==
- Foreign relations of Cuba
- Foreign relations of Serbia
- Cuba–Yugoslavia relations
