= Yugoslav training ship Galeb =

Presidential yacht and training ship of Yugoslavia

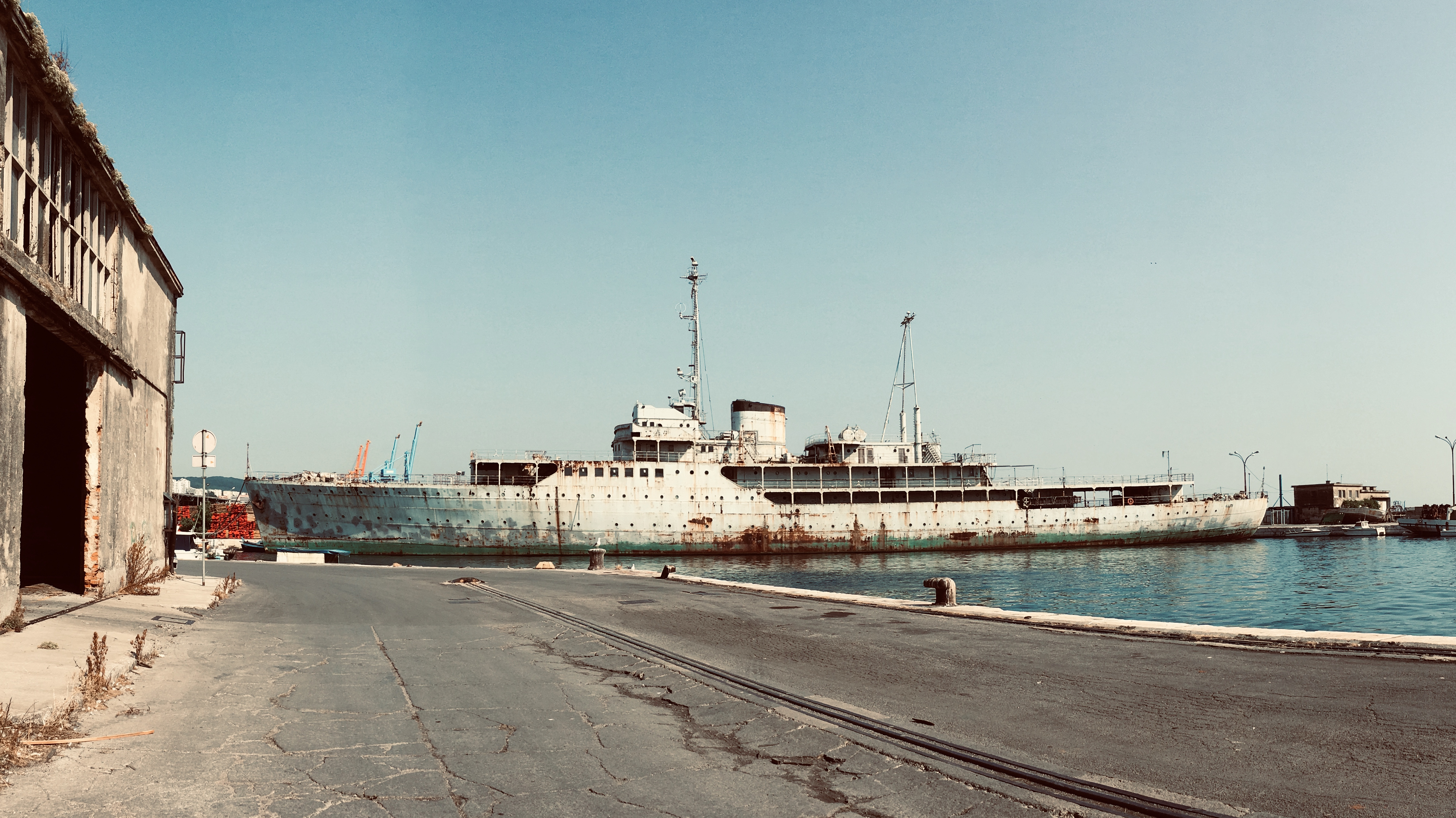
- Galeb in dock, Viktor Lenac Shipyard, Kostrena, Croatia, 2019

History

Italy
- Name: Ramb III
- Builder: Ansaldo, Genoa
- Acquired: 1938
- Out of service: 1943
- Identification: IMO number: 8961248

Germany
- Name: Kiebitz
- Acquired: 1943
- Out of service: 1944
- Identification: IMO number: 8961248
- Fate: Sunk by Allies

Yugoslavia
- Name: Galeb
- Acquired: 1952
- Out of service: 1991
- Identification: IMO number: 8961248
- Fate: Docked after disbanding of Yugoslav Navy

General characteristics
- Type: Former presidential yacht
- Displacement: 5754 tonnes
- Length: 117 m (383.86 ft)
- Beam: 15 m (49.21 ft)
- Installed power: 5,400 kW (7,200 bhp)
- Propulsion: two Fiat marine diesel engines
- Speed: 17.6 knots

Yugoslav Navy (JRM) training ship Galeb, also known as The Peace Ship Galeb (Brod Mira Galeb), is a museum ship permanently moored at Molo Longo, Rijeka, Croatia. The vessel was used as an official yacht by the late President of the Yugoslav Republic, Marshal Josip Broz Tito. The ship attained an iconic status among the peoples of Yugoslavia in this role, as well as among the many diverse nations and members of the Non-Aligned Movement. "Galeb" is Serbo-Croatian for "seagull".

== History ==
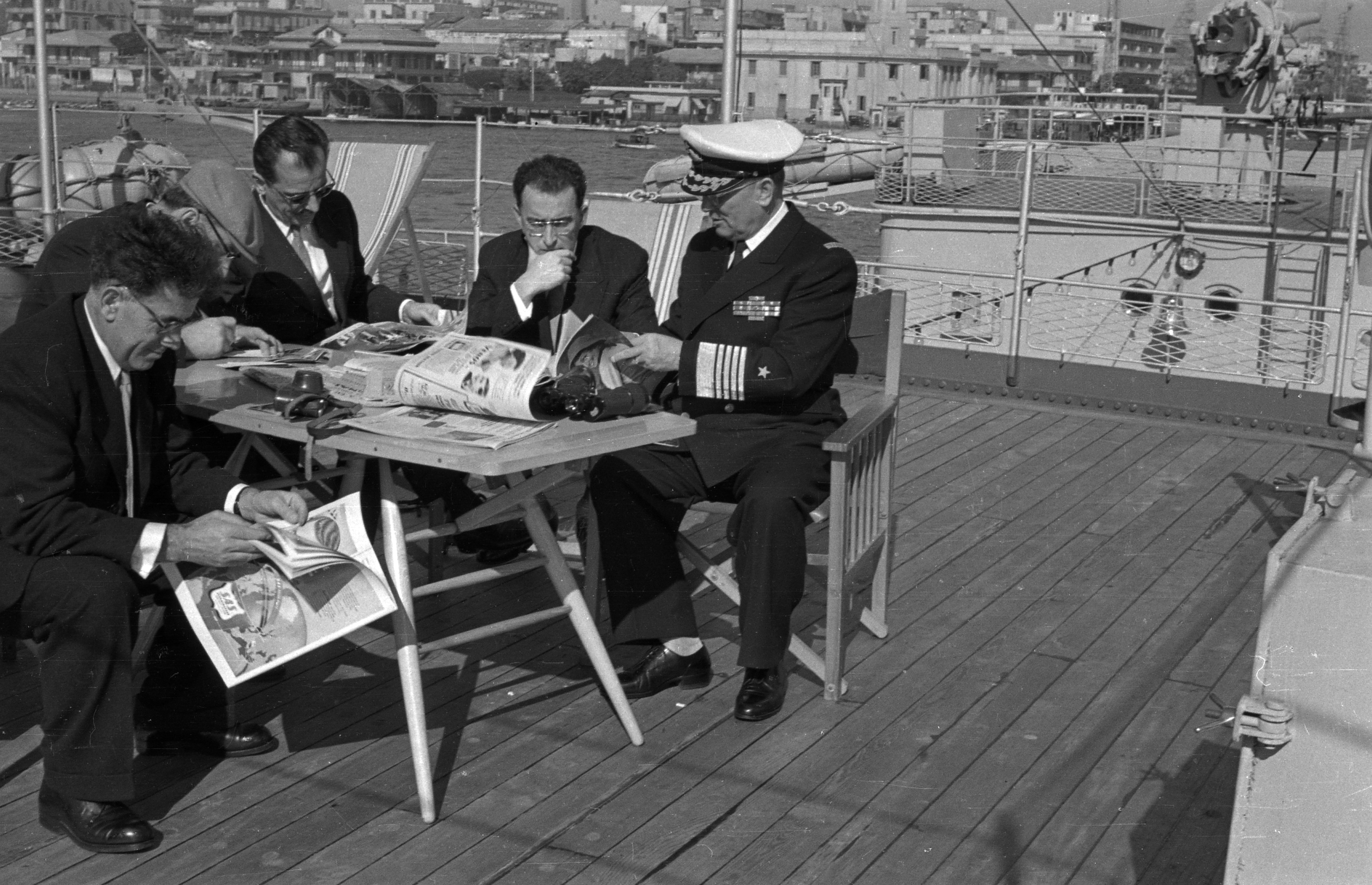
Tito reading newspapers onboard Galeb in the Suez Canal

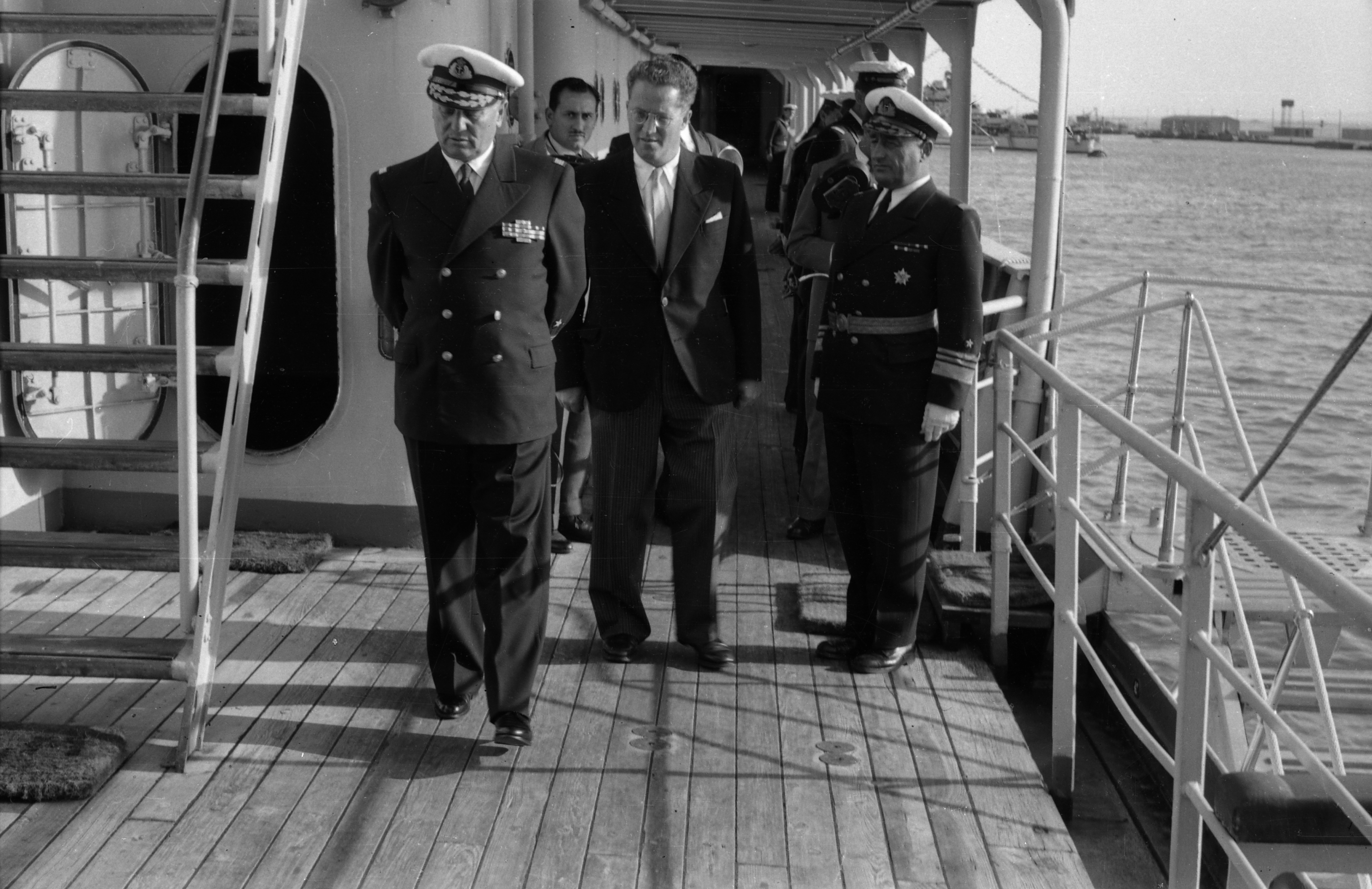
Tito onboard Galeb

Galeb was built in 1938 in Genoa as the banana boat Ramb III, destined for service in the banana trade between Africa and Italy. In the course of the battle of the Mediterranean, Ramb III was employed both as an auxiliary cruiser in escort duties and as transport ship. After the armistice in 1943, it was taken over by the Germans and turned it into a minelayer under the name Kiebitz. While in Rijeka it was sunk on 25 November 1944 by Allied aircraft. During attempts to put out the fire, two firefighters from Rijeka, Mario Zele and Ulff Angelo Fuzini, died.

The Split shipping company Brodospas raised Kiebitz in 1948, after which it was taken to the Pula ship building company Uljanik where in 1952 it was reconstructed as a school ship of the Yugoslav Navy under the new name Galeb. Tito embarked on it the first time in 1952 in Podgora, where he conducted an inspection of the boats in the YWN from the deck of the ship. In the next 27 years Galeb was in Tito's service for a total of 549 days, of which, for 318 days, the Marshal was on board, sailing 86,062 nautical miles (159,387 km) over the Adriatic and other seas on political missions. By Tito's death, 102 world statesmen had stayed on Galeb.

Galeb is 117 metres long and 15 metres wide with a displacement of 5,754 tonnes. With the speed of 17.6 knots (32.6 km/h) it is powered by two Fiat diesel engines of 7,200 horsepower in total. The Italians, at one point, offered to SFRJ to remove them and exhibit them in the Fiat museum in Turin. In return, they offered to build an entirely new, modern, school ship, but the Yugoslavs declined.

The ship first came to international attention in March 1953 when it brought Tito from Yugoslavia to the River Thames, following the invitation from the British Government headed by Prime Minister Winston Churchill. It was the first visit to United Kingdom of a communist head of state. Due to the yacht's size, Galeb moored at Greenwich. Proposals for the ship to dock at Malta en route to Britain were refused by the islands' Governor.

Tito loved the glamour the yacht conferred on his regime. He used it for parties, foreign visits and diplomacy. World leaders entertained there included Nikita Khrushchev, Muammar Gaddafi and Indira Gandhi. Tito was particularly excited to welcome Elizabeth Taylor and Richard Burton, who played Tito in the 1973 war epic The Battle of Sutjeska.

Galeb was used by Marshal Tito from 1948 till his death in 1980. Following the breakup of Yugoslavia in 1991, the yacht became the property of the Montenegrin government. It was sold to John Paul Papanicolaou, the same Greek yachtsman who owned the yacht Christina O. It was moored on the quayside of the Viktor Lenac Shipyard in Kostrena, a suburb of Rijeka for a time before being towed to its current location on the Rijeka waterfront. The Croatian authorities placed a preservation order on Galeb in the hope of acquiring the vessel to become a museum ship. In September 2008 the boat partially sank on its right side after a leak developed in its hull. On 22 May 2009, the ship was sold to city of Rijeka for US$150,000, subsequently confirmed by the High Mercantile Court of Croatia.

Since then it has occasionally been opened to the public for art exhibitions, conferences and the like. On 16 July 2014, the Mayor of Rijeka announced that the Galeb would be leased out for mixed use, partly as a museum incorporating the former President's private rooms and some of the engineering space, and partly for commercial activities such as restaurants and bars. Tenders for private sector investment were invited, but produced no response. Funding of EUR 4.5 million was secured as part of Rijeka's successful bid to become European Capital of Culture in 2020. Some of Galeb's furniture had already been restored and was temporarily being shown in Rijeka City Museum awaiting completion of the works.

The restoration was almost finished by February 2025, when she was moored at Molo Longo, but it was behind schedule because the budget limit had been exceeded; however, Galeb was eventually open to visitors the next 9 May, on the occasion of Victory Day.

== Guests ==
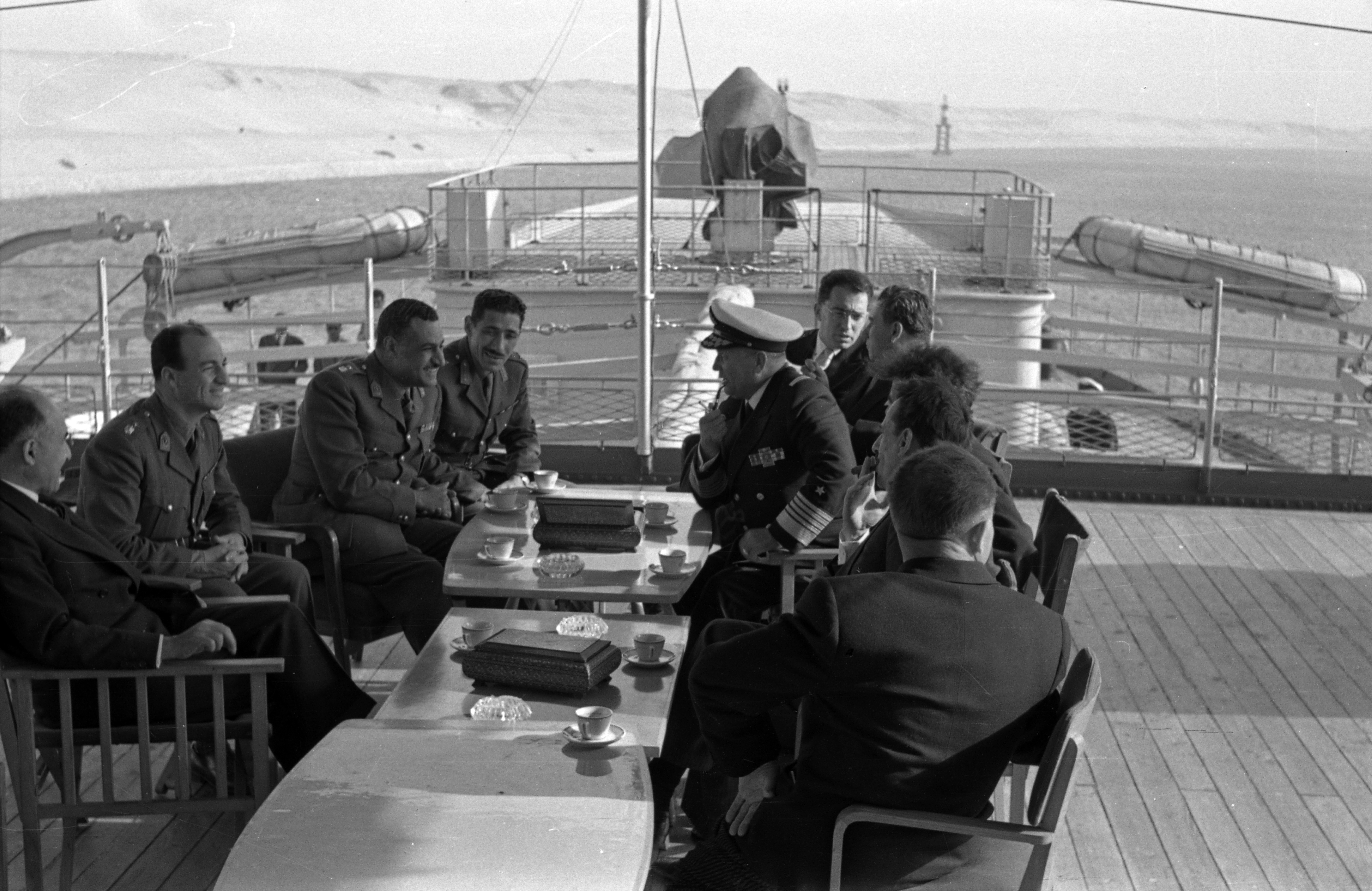
The meeting between Josip Broz Tito and Gamal Abdel Nasser held in 1955 onboard Galeb

=== Heads of state ===
The following heads of state have been entertained on the Galeb:

- Prime Minister Jawaharlal Nehru - India
- President Gamal Abdel Nasser - Egypt
- Queen Elizabeth II - UK
- Secretary General Nikita Sergeyevich Khrushchev - USSR
- Secretary General Leonid Brezhnev - USSR
- Emperor Haille Selassie - Ethiopia
- UN Secretary General and President Kurt Waldheim - Austria
- President Nicolae Ceauşescu - Romania
- Chairman Muammar Gaddafi - Libya
- Prime Minister Indira Gandhi - India
- President Wojciech Jaruzelski - Poland

=== Private citizens ===
The following people have been entertained on the Galeb:

- Kirk Douglas
- Richard Burton
- Sophia Loren
- Elizabeth Taylor

== See also ==
- List of motor yachts by length
- List of international trips made by Josip Broz Tito

=== Ships of comparable role, configuration and era ===
- HMY Britannia
- USS Williamsburg

== Bibliography ==
- Freivogel, Zvonimir (2006). "Into History Under Three Names: Ramb III — Kiebitz — Galeb". Warship International. XLIII (2): 169–182. ISSN 0043-0374.
