= 6th Summit of the Non-Aligned Movement =

1979 Havana summit conference

Summit Conference of Heads of State or Government of the Non-Aligned Movement
- Host country: Cuba
- Date: 3–6 September 1979
- Cities: Havana
- Chair: Fidel Castro (President of Cuba)
- Follows: 5th Summit (Colombo, Sri Lanka)
- Precedes: 7th Summit (New Delhi, India)

The 6th Summit of the Non-Aligned Movement took place on 3–9 September 1979 in Havana, the capital city of Cuba. 93 countries took part in the summit. It was the first NAM summit which took place in one Iberoamerican country. The event was marked by political and ideological divisions among the non-aligned countries. The organizer wanted to use the event to propose "a natural alliance" between the movement and the Eastern Bloc causing strong resistance from some members, particularly SFR Yugoslavia. While both Cuba and Yugoslavia were at the time socialist states, they took substantially different position in world politics with Cuba perceiving the United States and Yugoslavia perceiving the Soviet Union as the main threat to its independence.

SFR Yugoslavia, then one of the most active members of the movement, accused the Soviet Union and its allies for creation of divisions and efforts to manipulate the movement. Despite the strong hospitality that Yugoslav delegation received in Havana, Budimir Lončar was suspicious about further statements during the summit, as he had received a copy of Fidel Castro's speech in advance via Cuban Minister of Foreign Affairs and his personal friend, Isidoro Malmierca Peoli. Castro's strong words caused representative of China Wang Zhanyuan as well as the representative from the United States Interests Section in Havana to leave the conference room. The delegation of Sri Lanka, the host country of the previous 5th Summit of the Non-Aligned Movement, perceived the opening speech as deficient in showing appropriate level of statecraft, and the delegation of India described it as completely irresponsible. The Indian minister of foreign affairs warned the President of Cuba that he could not be aligned with one foot and non-aligned with another. The delegation of Indonesia commented that Castro was threatening everyone at the summit. President of Zambia Kenneth Kaunda distanced himself from Castro's comments on Southeast Asia and underlined that the political left and the center can oppose imperialism. Hostilities and divisions disappointed the delegation of Burma to the extent that they decided to leave the NAM altogether, which was perceived as one of the strongest gestures of the summit, with some other countries such as Argentina considering the same move. President of Panama Arístides Royo underlined Josip Broz Tito's support on the process leading to the Torrijos–Carter Treaties, which convinced his country to join the NAM. After the speech by the representative of Egypt, Boutros Boutros-Ghali, the host decided to give the floor only to critics of the country and the Camp David Accords, with attacks from Madagascar, Iraq, Ethiopia, Iran, Angola, Vietnam, the Palestine Liberation Organization, the People's Republic of the Congo, and Benin following one after the other.

President of Yugoslavia and NAM veteran Josip Broz Tito condemned the Cuban view of "a natural alliance" between the nonaligned movement and the communist bloc underlining that the movement "is not, and cannot be, either a conveyor belt or the reserve of any bloc". The trip to the NAM conference in Havana was the penultimate international trip of the President of Yugoslavia, which contributed to the worsening of his health condition and his death in 1980. At the time, the repudiation of the "natural alliance" led by Yugoslavia was perceived as a success having positive effects on United States–Yugoslavia relations. Cuba at the same time believed that Yugoslavia, as a "relatively small, comparatively developed, white, European and Northern," country did not deserve such a prominent place in the movement, yet the effort to marginalize it at the summit was unsuccessful. President of Tanzania Julius Nyerere responded directly to some of the accusations underlining the original NAM principles and stating that while the movement itself is a progressive movement it is not a grouping only of and for progressive countries. He also refused the idea that the movement can have permanent enemies. President Nyerere strongly rejected requests by some to delete statements by Egyptian delegation. The post-Francoist Spain took part as a guest of the summit for the first time ever.

== See also ==
- Cuba–Soviet Union relations
- Cuba–Yugoslavia relations
- 1979 United Nations Security Council election
