= 5th Summit of the Non-Aligned Movement =

1976 Colombo summit conference

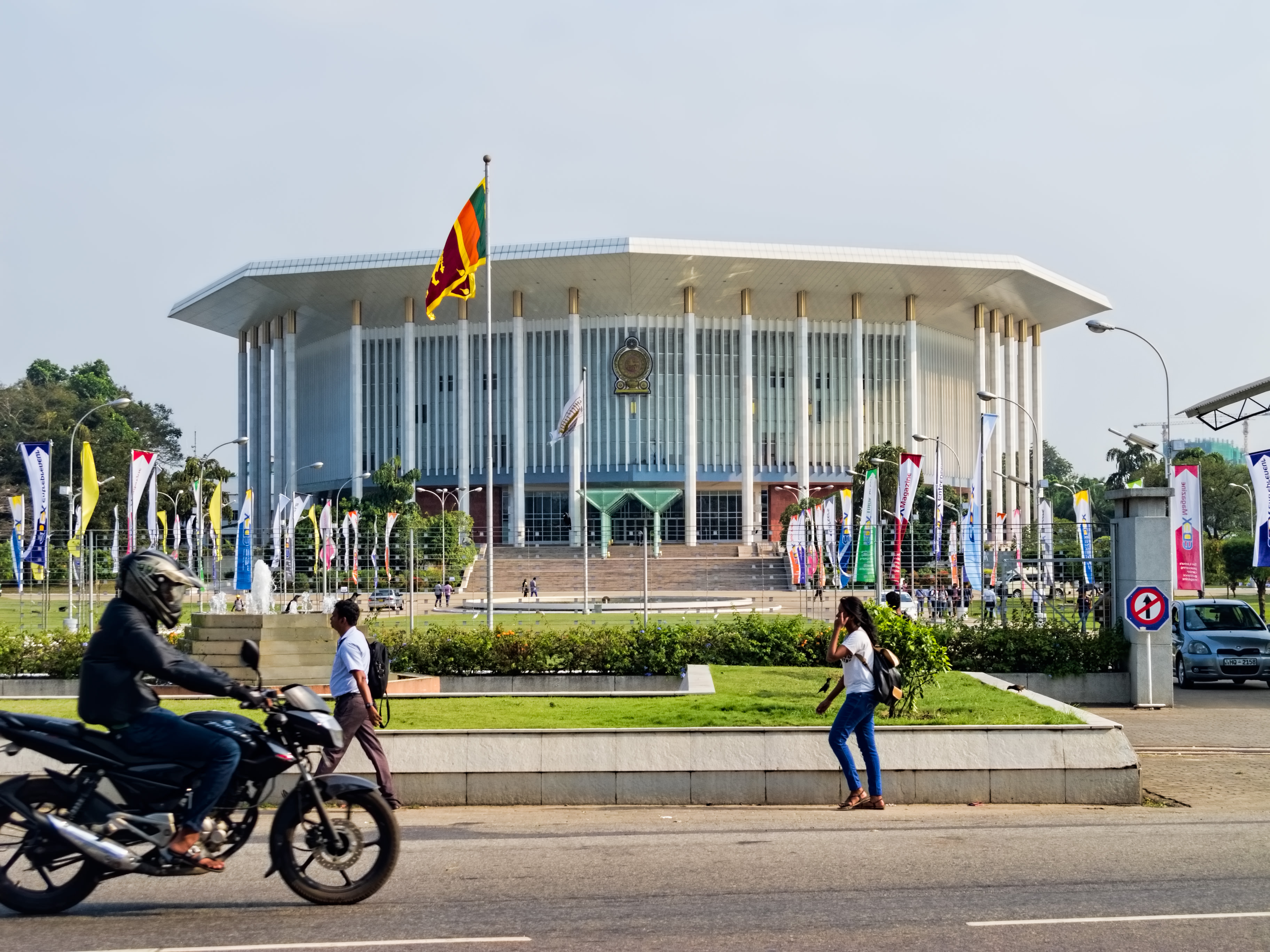
- Venue of the Summit
- Host country: Sri Lanka
- Date: 16–19 August 1976
- Cities: Colombo
- Chair: Sirimavo Bandaranaike (Prime Minister of Sri Lanka)
- Follows: 4th Summit of the Non-Aligned Movement (Algiers, Algeria)
- Precedes: 6th Summit of the Non-Aligned Movement (Havana, Cuba)

5th Summit of the Non-Aligned Movement on 16–19 August 1976 in Colombo, Sri Lanka was the conference of Heads of State or Government of the Non-Aligned Movement. 86 nations participated in the summit with additional 30 observers and guests representing all the continents in the world. The summit was the biggest international conference ever held in Sri Lanka and one of the greatest achievements in its foreign policy. The event took place at the Bandaranaike Memorial International Conference Hall, the first purpose-built conference hall in Asia. It was the first leaders' summit of the movement to be organized in Asia. The decisions of the NAM Coordination Bureau organisation and membership conditions were formally defined at the Colombo Summit. The body was to have 25 members (12 from Africa, 8 from Asia, 4 from Latin America and 1 from Europe) and was expected to meet regularly at the United Nations Headquarters in New York City.

Prime Minister of Sri Lanka Sirimavo Bandaranaike prioritized economic issues in discussions motivated both by Sri Lanka's own economic interests and the creation of a more properly non-aligned venue, free of extreme anti-western rhetoric. India, Sri Lanka, SFR Yugoslavia and Indonesia worked together at the conference to temper more radical proposals by some of the newer member states of the movement. The conference nevertheless defined Zionism as a form of racism, a definition which was restated at future NAM events.

The logo of the conference included references to five values: self-determination, economic development, peace and security, solidarity, and the denial of colonialism and imperialism. The Government of Sri Lanka declared a public holiday to enable residents in the capital city to enter the streets and greet foreign guests.

Sri Lanka selected senior career diplomats to handle the organization of the event with Dr. Vernon Mendis, High Commissioner in London, as the Secretary-General of the Summit and Leelananda de Silva as the Secretary to the Economic Committee of the Summit. It was the first conference attended by Vietnam after the reunification of the country.

The summit was publicly marked in various ways. The Central Bank of Sri Lanka released commemorative Rs. 5 coins and two post stamps of Rs 1.15 and Rs. 2, both carrying the portrait of Prime Minister Bandaranaike. The Ceylon Tobacco Company produced a special brand of cigarettes called ‘Summit’. While the Delegation of Yugoslavia arrived to the city by plane, the country also sent the Yugoslav training ship Galeb to the Port of Colombo ahead of the event. The ship served as a venue for bilateral and informal meetings with other participants, with first lady Jovanka Broz serving as a host.

== See also ==
- Foreign relations of Sri Lanka
- Sri Lanka and the Non-Aligned Movement
