= 4th Summit of the Non-Aligned Movement =

1973 Algiers summit conference

Summit Conference of Heads of State or Government of the Non-Aligned Movement
- Host country: Algeria
- Date: 5–9 September 1973
- Cities: Algiers
- Participants: Member states: Afghanistan; Equatorial Guinea; Libya; Nepal; Algeria; Madagascar; Niger; Argentina; Ethiopia; Malawi; Nigeria; Bangladesh; Gabon; Malaysia; Oman; Bahrain; Gambia; Morocco; Sri Lanka; Bhutan; Ghana; Peru; Sudan; Botswana; Guinea; Qatar; Swaziland; Burma; Guyana; Saudi Arabia; Syria; Burundi; India; Sierra Leone; Tanzania; Cambodia; Indonesia; Singapore; Togo; Cameroon; Iraq; Somalia; Trinidad and Tobago; Central African Republic; Ivory Coast; Republic of South Vietnam; Tunisia; Jamaica; Uganda; Chad; Jordan; Egypt; Chile; Kenya; Congo; Kuwait; Upper Volta; Cuba; Laos; Mali; South Yemen; Cyprus; Lebanon; Malta; Yugoslavia; Dahomey; Lesotho; Mauritania; Zaire; Liberia; Mauritius; Zambia; Observers: Barbados; Bolivia; Brazil; Colombia; Ecuador; Mexico; Panama; Uruguay; Venezuela; 14 African anticolonial movements Puerto Rican Socialist Party; Palestine Liberation Organization; Special guests: Austria; Finland Sweden
- Chair: Houari Boumédiène (Chairman of the Revolutionary Council)
- Follows: 3rd Summit (Lusaka, Zambia)
- Precedes: 5th Summit (Colombo, Sri Lanka)

4th Summit of the Non-Aligned Movement took place on 5–9 September 1973 in Algiers, the capital city of Algeria. The event took place in the Palace of Nations outside of the capital city. The general agenda for the summit was initially defined at the 1973 ministerial meeting in Kabul where the Algerian delegation welcomed the contribution of Guyana, India and SFR Yugoslavia. 76 countries in total participated in the summit calling upon the United States and the Soviet Union not to take important decisions on disarmament, world trade or the world monetary system without the effective participation of the Third World.

Argentina, Bangladesh, Bhutan, Malta, Oman, Peru and Qatar joined as the Non-Aligned Movement at the time of the conference. The Algerian host underlined the need for concrete measures to help liberation movements in Portuguese Africa and Palestine. Secretary-General of the United Nations Kurt Waldheim welcomed “very useful” talks on peace in the region. While the event coincided with the attack on the Saudi Arabian Embassy in Paris, the attack was not commented and the delegation of the country led by King Faisal maintained cordial interactions with Yasir Arafat. United States Mission to the United Nations noticed increased coordination among the member states, where Sub-Saharan African countries showed a unified front on the question of Apartheid regime in South Africa and Arab states on the issue of Palestine. The mission also noted the increasing importance of the core Arab-African members, with decreasing prominence of the original leaders of the movement such as Indonesia, India and even SFR Yugoslavia. With the strong support by Fidel Castro, Soviet leader Leonid Brezhnev sent a letter to the Algerian President ahead of the event, asking him to try to direct the movement towards Soviet strategic interests. Libyan leader Muammar Gaddafi accused Castro of being a representative of the USSR in the movement, whilst some expected guests were absent including the king Hussein of Jordan (due to disagreements with the Palestinian delegation) and Suharto (due to Sihanouk's participation). In this sensitive context, the Yugoslav delegation, prepared in advance at the meeting in Igalo, carefully drafted the speech for the President of Yugoslavia Josip Broz Tito in which he decided not to mention a word "socialism" once.

The conference adopted the decision on the mandate and the name of the future Coordinating Bureau, which would include 15 countries responsible for the organization of the following summit. The final document of the conference gave "unreserved support to the application of the principle that nationalization carried out by States [is understood] as an expression of their sovereignty". The United Nations General Assembly reaffirmed the declaration with a resolution supported by 108 countries and 1 vote (United Kingdom) against.

== See also ==
- 1973 Non-Aligned Standing Committee Conference
