= 1983 Conference of Ministers of Education and Culture of the Non-Aligned Movement =

International conference in North Korea

- Host country: North Korea
- Date: 24–28 September 1983
- Cities: Pyongyang
- Chair: Kim Il Sung

The 1983 Conference of Ministers of Education and Culture of the Non-Aligned Movement was the first conference of the NAM's ministers of education and culture, which took place between 24-28 September in Pyongyang, North Korea. North Korea's proposal to host this event received acknowledgment and endorsement in the final declaration of the 7th Summit of the Non-Aligned Movement in New Delhi, India, earlier that same year.

The conference in Pyongyang was opened with the speech of Kim Il Sung on development of national culture in emerging countries. The conference called upon the member states to cooperate with the new "Josip Broz Tito" Art Gallery of the Nonaligned Countries which was to open its doors in 1984.

== Context and organization ==
North Korea originally joined the Non-Aligned Movement from 1976 on the basis of unanimous decision at the 1975 Non-Aligned Foreign Ministers Conference in Lima, Peru. This was possible after normalization of North Korean relations with SFR Yugoslavia in 1971 (North Korea severely criticized what it called Yugoslav revisionism in 1950s and 1960s). Since then, Yugoslavia started supporting North Korean membership. North Korea unsuccessfully tried to bring the Korean conflict on the NAM agenda in first years of its membership. North Korean efforts to invite large number of high ranking NAM delegations to attend 70th birthday of Kim Il Sung was politely rejected as well, but the country aimed to host a large scale NAM event in reaction to the successful South Korean application to host the 1988 Summer Olympics.

North Korea subsequently ensured support of the NAM members to organize the NAM conference on education and culture. The embassy of the Hungarian People's Republic in Pyongyang sent a ciphered telegram on 15 August 1983 in which it strongly criticized the conduct of the Korean host for excluding Cuba from the committee, which was drafting the final documents, and for pushing Juche ideology.

After the event in Pyongyang, Mengistu Haile Mariam again confidentially told to the Yugoslav delegation that he preferred North Korea as a host of the upcoming 8th Summit of the Non-Aligned Movement as a counterbalance to 1988 Summer Olympics in South Korea and a response to the Western powers. The Yugoslav delegation nevertheless avoided replying to this proposal and stressed that the host would be decided at the 1985 Non-Aligned Foreign Ministers Conference in Luanda, Angola.

== See also ==
- Foreign relations of North Korea
