= Zimbabwe and the Non-Aligned Movement =

Since gaining independence in 1980, Zimbabwe has been a member state of the Non-Aligned Movement (NAM) and has adhered to a policy of active nonalignment. Harare, capital city of Zimbabwe, hosted the 8th Summit of the Non-Aligned Movement in 1986. The country hold the chairmanship of the movement between 1986 and 1989. Prior to independence, support for decolonization and the establishment of black majority rule in Rhodesia were among central issues on the agenda of the Non-Aligned Movement.

== History ==
=== Pre-independence ===
At the 2nd Summit of the Non-Aligned Movement in Cairo, Egypt participating countries condemned the repressive policies of the racist minority regime in Southern Rhodesia, which violated United Nations resolutions and denied fundamental freedoms. The conference urged all states to reject any independence declared under minority rule and instead consider recognizing an African nationalist government in exile, if established. The following 3rd Summit of the Non-Aligned Movement was organized in Lusaka, Zambia, one of the Frontline States. The location for the conference was in part selected in order to support Zambia whose sovereignty and borders were threatened by Rhodesia and Apartheid era South Africa.

=== 1980s ===
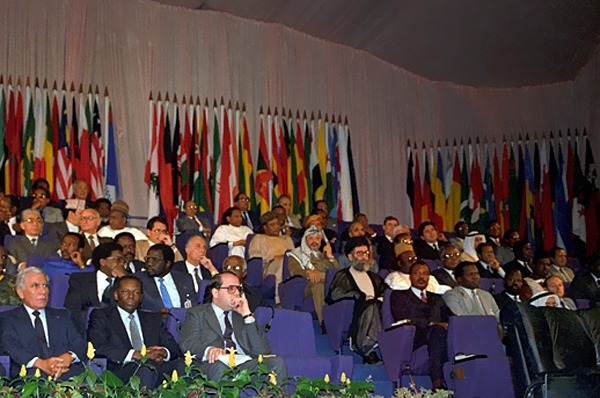
Delegates at the 8th Summit of the Non-Aligned Movement

Following Zimbabwe's independence in 1980 and country's selection to host the 8th Summit of the Non-Aligned Movement in 1986, the Yugoslav construction company Energoprojekt was selected to implement its largest project to date—the design and construction of a Congress Center and the Sheraton Hotel in Harare. The same company previously built the venue for the 3rd Summit of the Non-Aligned Movement in neighbouring Zambia. Initially designed for 2,500 seats, the project was modified at the request of Zimbabwe's prime minister Robert Mugabe, who envisioned hosting a NAM summit in the facility. The city of Harare was selected to host the summit at the 1985 Non-Aligned Foreign Ministers Conference in Luanda, Angola.

== See also ==
- Ghana and the Non-Aligned Movement
- Tanzania and the Non-Aligned Movement
- Egypt and the Non-Aligned Movement
- Yugoslavia–Zimbabwe relations
