= List of international presidential trips made by Zia-ul-Haq =

This is a list of international trips made by Zia-ul-Haq, the 6th President of Pakistan, during his tenure as Pakistan's chief executive and president.

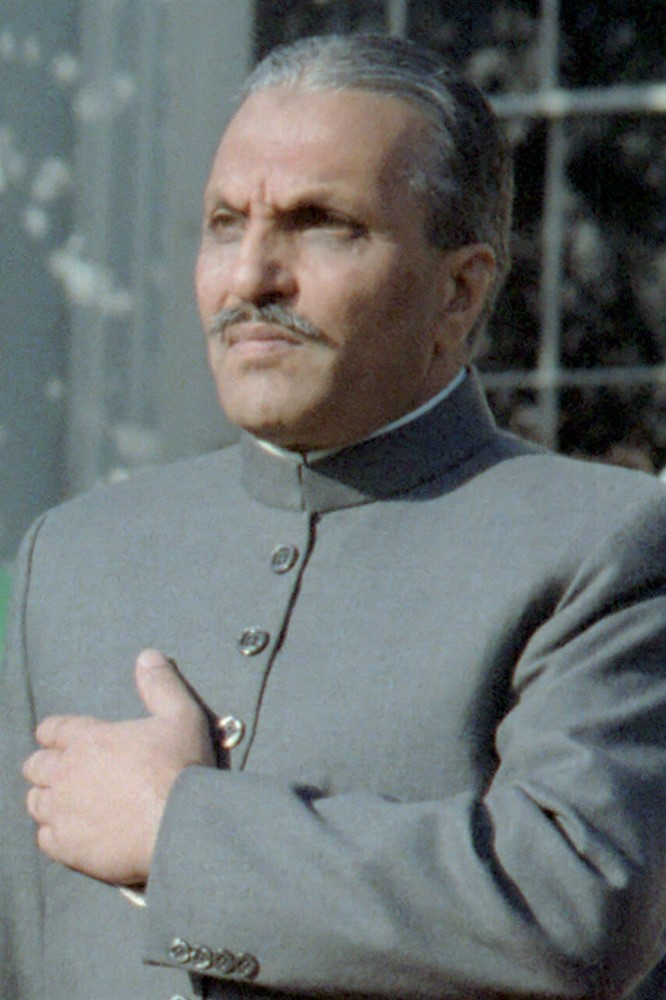
President of Pakistan General Zia-ul-Haq in 1982.

== 1977 ==
| Country | Date/s | Engagements | Ref. |
|---|---|---|---|
| Iran | October | Part of an early Muslim-world tour undertaken after the change of government in Pakistan, to explain the new regime's position and seek support. | |
| Saudi Arabia | October | Part of an early Muslim-world tour undertaken after the change of government in Pakistan, to explain the new regime's position and seek support. | |
| UAE | October | Part of an early Muslim-world tour undertaken after the change of government in Pakistan, to explain the new regime's position and seek support. | |
| Afghanistan | October | Part of an early Muslim-world tour undertaken after the change of government in Pakistan, to explain the new regime's position and seek support. | |
| Kuwait | October | Part of an early Muslim-world tour undertaken after the change of government in Pakistan, to explain the new regime's position and seek support. | |
| Turkey | October | Part of an early Muslim-world tour undertaken after the change of government in Pakistan, to explain the new regime's position and seek support. | |
| Libya | October | Part of an early Muslim-world tour undertaken after the change of government in Pakistan, to explain the new regime's position and seek support. | |
| Jordan | October | Part of an early Muslim-world tour undertaken after the change of government in Pakistan, to explain the new regime's position and seek support. | |
| China | 14–19 December | Paid an informal friendly visit to China and held talks with Chinese leaders in Beijing. | |

== 1978 ==
| Country | Date/s | Engagements | Ref. |
|---|---|---|---|
| Afghanistan | 9–11 September | Part of an unofficial goodwill mission. Met President Nur Muhammad Taraki at Paghman. | |
| Iran | 9–11 September | Visited Tehran for two days and held talks with the Shah. | |

== 1979 ==
| Country | Date/s | Engagements | Ref. |
|---|---|---|---|
| Cuba | 3–9 September | Attended the Sixth Non-Aligned Summit in Havana, addressed the conference on 6 September, and met President Fidel Castro. | |
| Saudi Arabia | 24–26 December | Met King Khalid and Crown Prince Fahd in Riyadh. | |

== 1980 ==
| Country | Date/s | Engagements | Ref. |
|---|---|---|---|
| China | May | Paid a visit to China, reaffirming close Sino–Pakistani ties. | |
| Iran | 27 September – 3 October | Started an Islamic mediation mission over the Iran–Iraq War. | |
| Iraq | 27 September – 3 October | Continued the mediation effort in Baghdad. | |
| United Nations | 27 September – 3 October | Addressed the Thirty-fifth session of the United Nations General Assembly on behalf of the Islamic world. | |
| United States | 27 September – 3 October | Met President Jimmy Carter in Washington, D.C.. | |

== 1981 ==
| Country | Date/s | Engagements | Ref. |
|---|---|---|---|
| Saudi Arabia | 25–28 January | Attended the Third Islamic Summit Conference held at Mecca and Taif. | |

== 1982 ==
| Country | Date/s | Engagements | Ref. |
|---|---|---|---|
| China | 17–19 October | Paid an official visit to China and held talks with President Li Xiannian and Premier Zhao Ziyang. | |
| India | 1 November | Made a brief stop in New Delhi and met Prime Minister Indira Gandhi. | |
| Indonesia | November | Visited Indonesia as part of a South-East Asia tour. | |
| Malaysia | November | Visited Malaysia as part of a South-East Asia tour. | |
| Singapore | November | Visited Singapore and said the tour would further cement Pakistan's relations with ASEAN states. | |
| Soviet Union | 14–15 November | Attended the funeral of Soviet leader Leonid Brezhnev in Moscow and held meetings with several world leaders. | |
| United States | 6–13 December | Paid a state visit to the United States. Met President Ronald Reagan in Washington, D.C.. | |
| Canada | 14–18 December | Began a five-day state visit to Canada; held talks with Prime Minister Pierre Trudeau. | |

== 1983 ==
| Country | Date/s | Engagements | Ref. |
|---|---|---|---|
| India | 9–10 March | Attended the 7th Non-Aligned Summit in New Delhi. Met Prime Minister Indira Gandhi, President Zail Singh and Fidel Castro. India and Pakistan signed an agreement setting up a joint commission. | |
| Turkey | 29 August – 3 September | Paid a state visit at the invitation of President Kenan Evren. | |

== 1984 ==
| Country | Date/s | Engagements | Ref. |
|---|---|---|---|
| Morocco | 16–19 January | Attended the Fourth Islamic Summit Conference in Casablanca. | |
| Brunei | 23 February | Attended Brunei's independence celebrations in Bandar Seri Begawan. | |

== 1985 ==
| Country | Date/s | Engagements | Ref. |
|---|---|---|---|
| Soviet Union | 12–15 March | Attended the funeral of Konstantin Chernenko in Moscow. Met Mikhail Gorbachev and several other world leaders, including Prime Minister Rajiv Gandhi. | |
| South Korea | 6–10 May | Held summit talks with President Chun Doo-hwan, visited industrial facilities and met Korean business leaders. | |
| Burma | May | Paid a two-day visit to Burma and held talks with President U. San Yu in Rangoon. | |
| Bangladesh | 4–7 June | Paid a short visit to Bangladesh and visited cyclone-devastated Urir Char. | |
| United Nations | 23 October | Addressed the 40th-anniversary commemorative session of the United Nations General Assembly in New York City. | |
| Bangladesh | 7–8 December | Attended the 1st SAARC Summit in Dhaka and signed the SAARC Charter. | |
| India | December | Made a brief visit to New Delhi for informal discussions with Prime Minister Rajiv Gandhi after the first SAARC summit. | |

== 1986 ==
| Country | Date/s | Engagements | Ref. |
|---|---|---|---|
| Zimbabwe | 4 September | Addressed the Eighth Non-Aligned Summit in Harare. | |

== 1987 ==
| Country | Date/s | Engagements | Ref. |
|---|---|---|---|
| India | 21–23 February | Made a surprise cricket diplomacy visit to India. Attended the India–Pakistan Test at Jaipur and held talks with Prime Minister Rajiv Gandhi to ease border tensions. | |
