= 9th Summit of the Non-Aligned Movement =

1989 Belgrade summit conference

9th Summit of the Non-Aligned Movement: IX samit Pokreta nesvrstanih zemalja (Serbo-Croatian); IX самит Покрета несврстаних земаља (Serbo-Croatian); IX самит на Движењето на неврзаните (Macedonian); IX vrh gibanja neuvrščenih (Slovene)
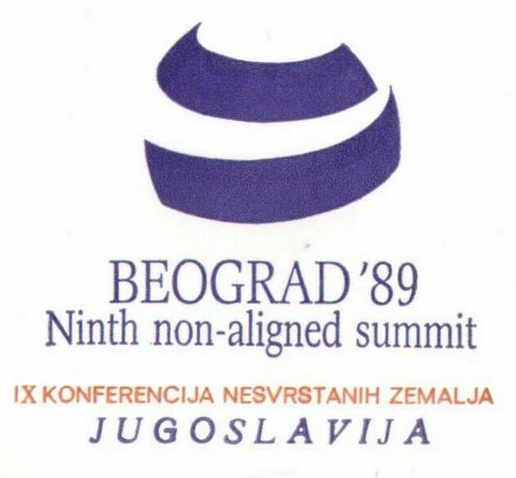

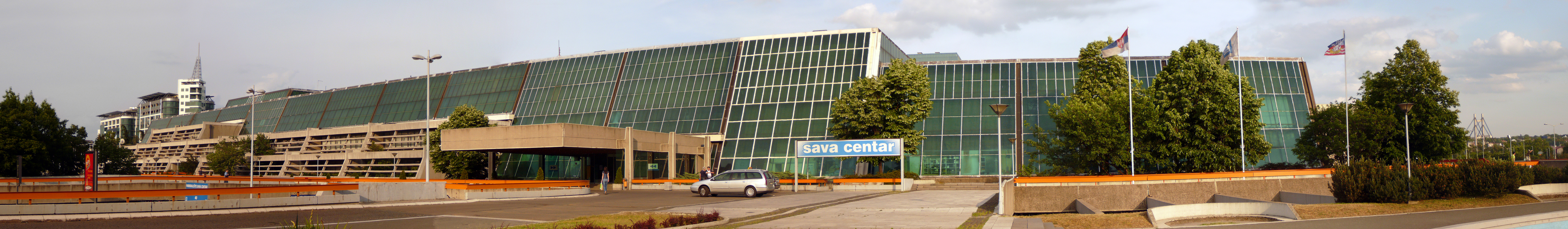
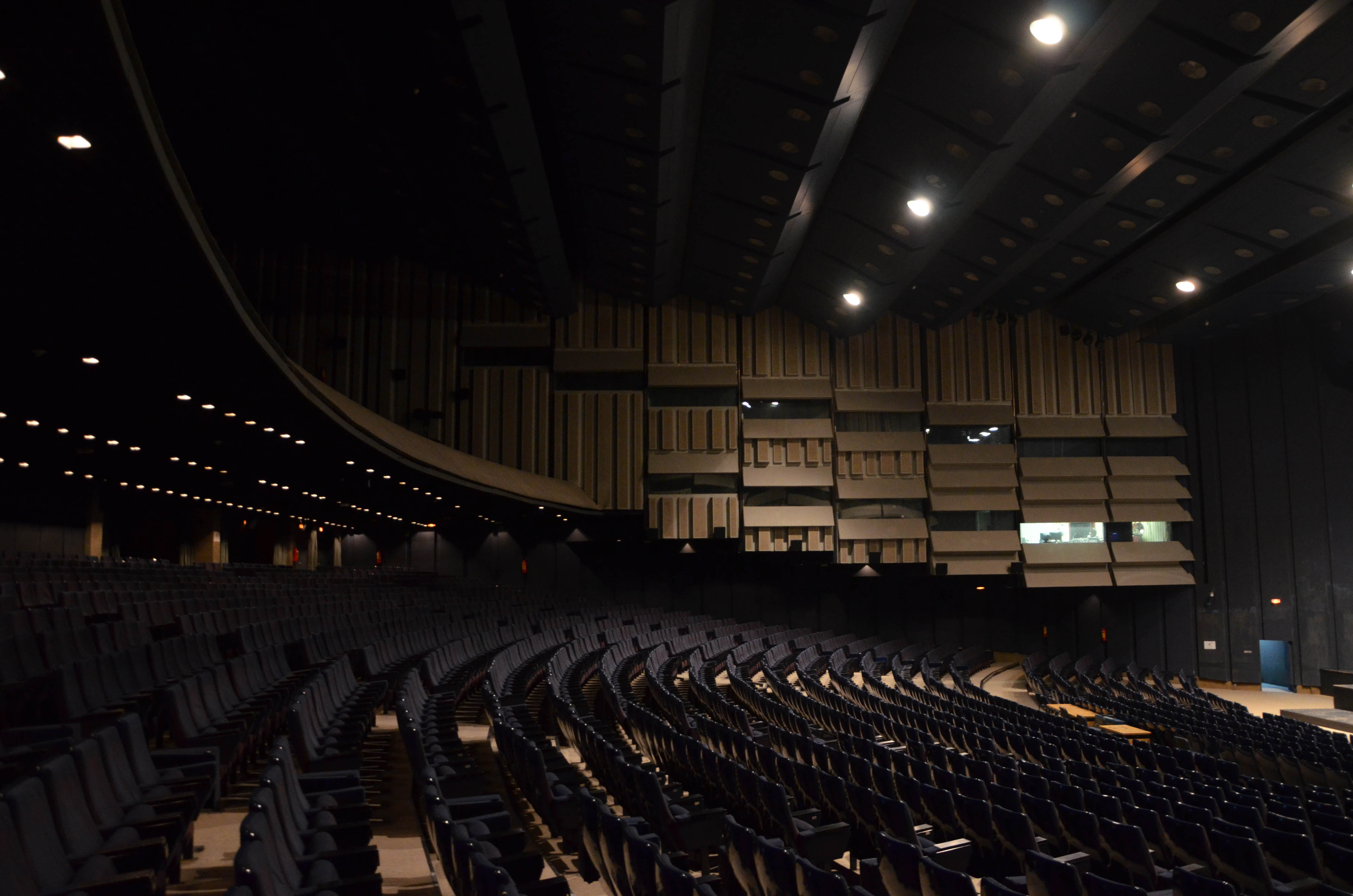
- Venue of the Summit
- Host country: Yugoslavia
- Date: 4–7 September 1989
- Cities: Belgrade
- Venues: Sava Centar
- Chair: Janez Drnovšek (President of the Presidency of Yugoslavia)
- Follows: 8th Summit of the Non-Aligned Movement (Harare, Zimbabwe)
- Precedes: 10th Summit of the Non-Aligned Movement (Jakarta, Indonesia)

The 9th Summit of the Non-Aligned Movement on 4–7 September 1989 in Belgrade, SR Serbia, SFR Yugoslavia was the conference of Heads of State or Government of the Non-Aligned Movement. Belgrade was the first city to host the summit for the second time, after it hosted the 1st Summit of the Non-Aligned Movement in 1961. Yugoslavia was unanimously selected as the host of the summit at the 1988 Non-Aligned Foreign Ministers Conference in Nicosia, Cyprus. While the Federal Secretary of Foreign Affairs of Yugoslavia Budimir Lončar was enthusiastic, the Presidency of Yugoslavia, a collective head of state, were skeptical about the prospect of hosting the event. They ultimately supported it, with Josip Vrhovec fearing that rejection might show the level of the crisis in the country. The relatively weak federal government organising the event hoped that the conference might convince leaders of the strong Yugoslav federal republics to resolve the early Yugoslav crisis in a constructive and peaceful way. It nevertheless escalated into the 1991 Yugoslav Wars, with the event therefore sometimes described as the swan song of prominent Yugoslav Cold War diplomacy. The summit took place at the Sava Centar in New Belgrade. Janez Drnovšek held the opening remarks in Slovenian.

At the summit, Yugoslavia succeeded in persuading members states to exclude anti-American and anti-Western positions from the final document, which also avoided harsh criticism of Israel and Zionism. For the first time, it explicitly included human rights and freedom as well as women's rights provisions. Yugoslavia nevertheless welcomed Yasser Arafat as the President of Palestine and not as the head of the Palestine Liberation Organization. Unsatisfied with the host's stance, more radical members of the movement such as Iraq, Iran and Cuba sent lower-ranking officials to lead their delegations in Belgrade. Career diplomat and the last Yugoslav representative the United Nations Darko Šilović was responsible for the organization of the summit. Novi Sad Fair, Belgrade Fair and Zagreb Fair all proposed exhibitions related to NAM during the event while the Yugoslav Lexicographical Institute in Zagreb proposed scientific and cultural symposia on the NAM, with numerous other economic and cultural events taking place all around Yugoslavia. Delegates at the conference planted trees at the New Belgrade Park of Friendship.

== Participants ==
Participants were divided into categories of member states, observers and guests.

=== Member states ===
The following member states participated in the conference:

- Afghanistan
- Algeria
- Angola
- Argentina
- Bahrain
- Bangladesh
- Barbados
- Belize
- Benin
- Bhutan
- Bolivia
- Botswana
- Burkina Faso
- Burundi
- Cameroon
- Cape Verde
- Central African Republic
- Chad
- Colombia
- Comoros
- Congo
- Côte d'Ivoire
- Cuba
- Cyprus
- North Korea
- South Yemen
- Djibouti
- Ecuador
- Egypt
- Equatorial Guinea
- Ethiopia
- Gabon
- Gambia
- Ghana
- Guinea
- Guinea Bissau
- Guyana
- India
- Indonesia
- Iran
- Iraq
- Jamaica
- Jordan
- Kenya
- Kuwait
- Laos
- Lebanon
- Lesotho
- Liberia
- Libya
- Madagascar
- Malawi
- Malaysia
- Maldives
- Mali
- Malta
- Mauritania
- Mauritius
- Morocco
- Mozambique
- Nepal
- Nicaragua
- Niger
- Nigeria
- Oman
- Pakistan
- Palestine
- Panama
- Peru
- Qatar
- Rwanda
- Sao Tome and Principe
- Saudi Arabia
- Senegal
- Seychelles
- Sierra Leone
- Singapore
- Somalia
- Namibia (SWAPO)
- Sri Lanka
- Sudan
- Suriname
- Swaziland
- Syria
- Tanzania
- Togo
- Trinidad and Tobago
- Tunisia
- Uganda
- United Arab Emirates
- Vanuatu
- Venezuela
- Vietnam
- Yemen Arab Republic
- SFR Yugoslavia
- Zaire
- Zambia
- Zimbabwe

=== Observers ===
The following states, organizations and liberation movements participated in the conference as observers:

- Antigua and Barbuda
- Brazil
- Mexico
- Mongolia
- Papua New Guinea
- Philippines
- Uruguay
- African National Congress
- Afro-Asian People's Solidarity Organisation
- Kanak and Socialist National Liberation Front
- International Center for Public Enterprises in Developing Countries
- Arab League
- Organization of African Unity
- Organisation of the Islamic Conference
- Pan Africanist Congress of Azania
- Socialist Party (Puerto Rico)
- United Nations

=== Guests ===
A large number of states attended the conference as guests:

- Australia
- Austria
- Bulgaria
- Canada
- Czechoslovakia
- Finland
- East Germany
- Greece
- Holy See
- Hungary
- New Zealand
- Norway
- Poland
- Portugal
- Romania
- San Marino
- Spain
- Sweden
- Switzerland

Alongside states, the following organizations attended as guests: Commonwealth Secretariat, Food and Agriculture Organization, International Committee of the Red Cross, International Conference on the Question of Palestine, International Fund for Agricultural Development, Latin American Economic System, International Federation of Red Cross and Red Crescent Societies, Preferential Trading Area (PTA), Southern African Development Coordination Conference, United Nations Ad Hoc Committee on the Indian Ocean, United Nations Committee on the Exercise of the Inalienable Rights Of the Palestinian People, United Nations Conference on Trade and Development, United Nations Council for Namibia, United Nations Development Programme, United Nations Industrial Development Organization, United Nations High Commissioner for Refugees, United Nations Institute for Disarmament Research, UNICEF, United Nations Research and Training Centre for the Advancement of Women, United Nations Special Committee against Apartheid, World Association for World Federation, Special Committee on the Situation with Regard to the Implementation of the Declaration on the Granting of Independence to the Colonial Countries and Peoples, World Food Council, World Food Programme and World Health Organization.

== Cultural Heritage ==
=== Belgrade Urban Monuments Submitted by Yugoslav Municipalities ===
The 1989 conference was commemorated in various ways including by commemorative gifts to the City of Belgrade by various Yugoslav municipalities, companies and individuals. The City of Skopje, capital of the Socialist Republic of Macedonia, sent the Associative Figure by Vasil Vasilev. Other municipalities from Macedonia provided a mosaic by Momčilo Petrovski for a building in Knez Mihailova Street, number 27.

Municipalities from the regions of Slavonia and Baranya in the Socialist Republic of Croatia provided a commemorative fountain in front of the Music Academy in Belgrade. The City of Split provided its own commemorative fountain that was built in the Academic Park. Municipalities from Zagorje, Gospić, Karlovac and Sisak region provided a mural by Ivan Rabuzin for a building in Knez Mihailova Street. Municipalities from the region of Dalmatia and the City of Osijek jointly provided Victory fountain by Jovana Nježić for the Tašmajdan Park. Bjelovar and Varaždin provided the sculpture The Woman Who Sits by Ivan Sabolić.

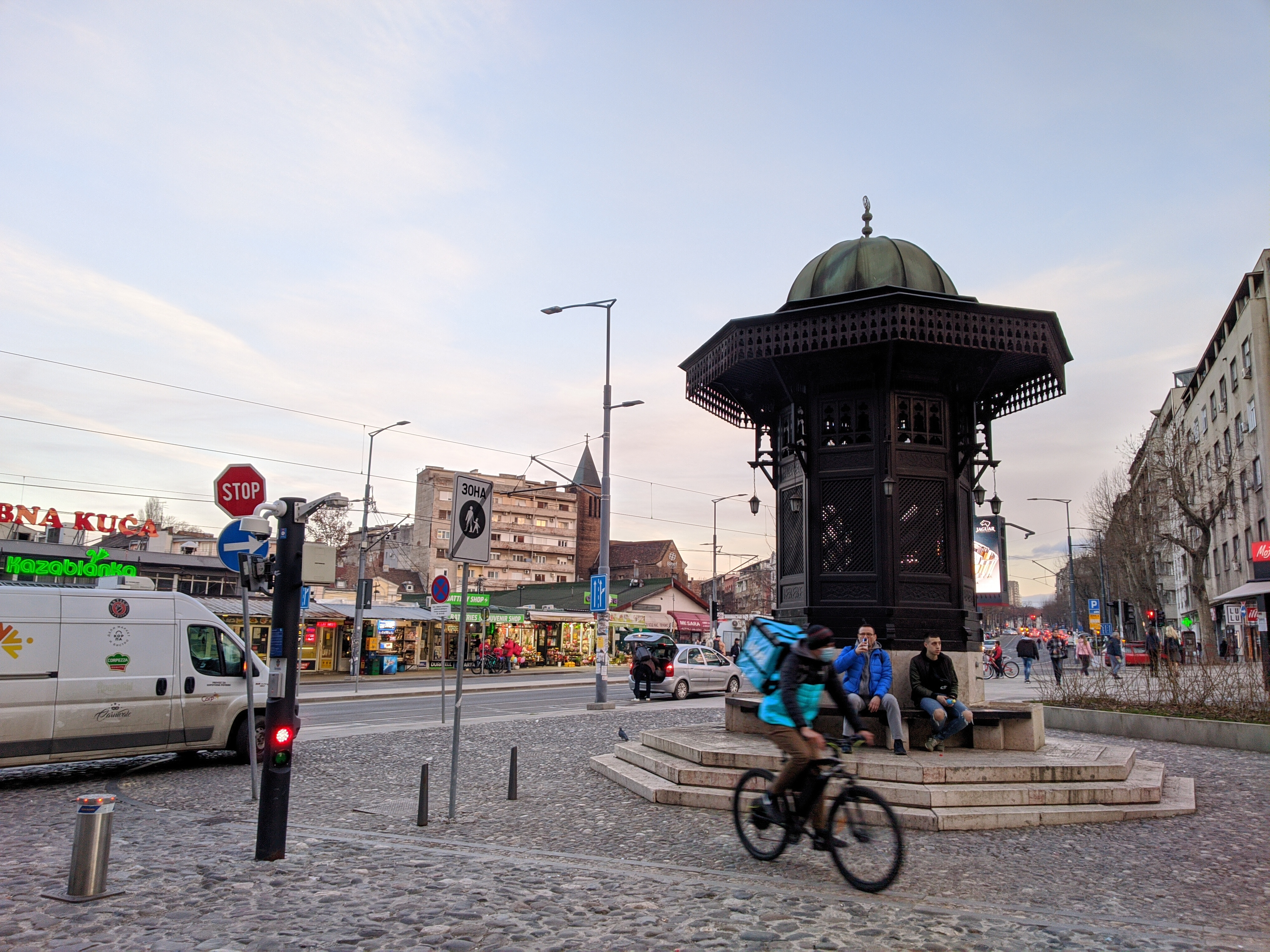
Sebilj replica in Skadarlija

Municipalities from the Socialist Republic of Bosnia and Herzegovina provided a mural by Ibrahim Ljubović for a building at Terazije. The City of Sarajevo provided a replica of Sebilj in Sarajevo for the Skadarlija street. Municipalities from the Socialist Republic of Montenegro provided a sculpture installation at the Tašmajdan Park named Kućište by artist Ratko Vulanović.

Municipalities from the region of Banat in the Socialist Autonomous Province of Vojvodina provided commemorative Banat fountain by Mišo Berbakov. The City of Novi Sad, together with municipalities of Ada, Apatin, Bač, Bačka Palanka, Bački Petrovac, Bečej, Žabalj, Kanjiža, Kula, Mali Iđoš, Odžaci, Senta, Sombor, Inđija, Irig, Pećinci, Ruma, Sremska Mitrovica, Stara Pazova and Šid provided the Waterfalls fountain by Đorđe Bobić and Čedomir Vasić, in front of the Yugoslav Drama Theatre. Kikinda provided the sculpture Wild Boar by Nikola Vukosavljević exhibited in the Tašmajdan Park. Municipal associations from Central Serbia and Socialist Autonomous Province of Kosovo provided conservation of the 1948 monument The Wounded by Vanja Radauš in front of the Yugoslav Drama Theatre as well as the mural by Slobodan Jevtić Pulika.

Whilst the Socialist Republic of Slovenia initially wanted to provide the reconstruction of the Belgrade monument Sima Igumanov with orphans by Slovene artist Lojze Dolinar, once the cast of the monument could not be found anywhere in Yugoslavia the republic decided to scrap any alternative proposal making Slovenia the only republic not participating in memorialization. The City of Zagreb considered giving a replica of the Manduševac fountain from the Republic Square and a replica of the Antun Gustav Matoš statue yet the idea was dropped due to limited funding.

== See also ==
- Yugoslavia and the Non-Aligned Movement
- 50th Anniversary Additional Commemorative Non-Aligned Meeting
- 60th Anniversary Additional Commemorative Non-Aligned Meeting
