= 1988 Non-Aligned Foreign Ministers Conference =

- Host country: Cyprus
- Date: September 1988
- Cities: Nicosia
- Chair: George Vassiliou (President of Cyprus)

1988 Non-Aligned Foreign Ministers Conference was held in Nicosia, capital of Cyprus in September 1988. 92 foreign ministers participating in the conference discussed United States and the Soviet Union rapprochement, South Africa's occupation of Namibia and Israel's occupation of Palestine, threats against Nicaragua, apartheid and the solution of the conflict in South-West Africa. During the conference, Socialist Federal Republic of Yugoslavia was unanimously selected as a host of the 9th Summit of the Non-Aligned Movement, making the country the first one to host the event for the second time after the 1961 Summit. While the Federal Secretary of Foreign Affairs of Yugoslavia led by Budimir Lončar was excited, the Presidency of Yugoslavia, a 9-member collective, was sceptical about the prospects of hosting the event but ultimately supported by Josip Vrhovec. Some other countries considered hosting the 9th summit, including Kuwait, Argentina, Peru, Cyprus and Nicaragua. Nicaraguan candidacy was opposed by Yugoslavia due to perceived radicalism and de facto alignment of the country. Cypriot informal candidacy, while attractive, was perceived as impractical as the country had only 4 embassies in NAM member states.

The Foreign Ministers Conference in Nicosia welcomed the United Nations efforts at resolution of the Cyprus dispute and demanded the immediate withdrawal of all occupation forces and settlers and welcomed the proposal for demilitarization of the island. The final document of the conference was described as more balanced and thoughtful compared to the final declaration of the 1986 Summit in Harare, Zimbabwe. Minister of Foreign Affairs of West Germany Hans-Dietrich Genscher welcomed Indian and Yugoslav proposals for modernisation of the movement, stating that it should "not be permitted to turn into an association of anticolonial struggle veterans".

== See also ==
- Foreign relations of Cyprus
