= 1985 Non-Aligned Foreign Ministers Conference =

- Host country: Angola
- Date: 4–7 September 1985
- Cities: Luanda
- Chair: José Eduardo dos Santos (President of Angola)

The 1985 Non-Aligned Foreign Ministers Conference (Portuguese: 1985 Conferência Ministerial do Movimento dos Países Não-Alinhados) was held in Luanda, capital of Angola from 4 to 7 September, with the senior officials meeting held on 2 and 3 September. The organization of the conference during the Angolan Civil War was described as a considerable achievement.

== Summary ==
The conference was the seventh meeting of foreign ministers of the Non-Aligned Movement. The organization of the conference was perceived as a success for the MPLA, which prevented its disruption by UNITA. Issues discussed at the conference included the situation in South Africa, great power rivalry, the Middle East situation, the question of Palestine, and peace in Lebanon. Representative of Singapore Yeo Cheow Tong highlighted the issue of the Vietnamese invasion of Cambodia describing Cambodia, Afghanistan and Central America as targets of exploitation by external powers. The conference confirmed the choice of the city of Harare as the host of the upcoming 8th Summit of the Non-Aligned Movement, showing solidarity with the countries affected by the policies of the apartheid regime. Indonesia also expressed its own wish to host the upcoming summit but withdrew its candidacy in deference to Zimbabwe. President José Eduardo dos Santos warned member states to keep their unity in the face of imperialism which wants to use inner quarrels divide the movement.

The final document invited member states to work on the creation of the new information order in which UNESCO's support would play a prominent role. Gathered delegations held a minute's silence for Indira Gandhi and Forbes Burnham. The final document of the conference called upon the white minority government in Pretoria to pay compensation to Angola for the damage caused to life and property, which was subsequently approved by the United Nations Security Council.

The CIA expected that the United States would receive sharp criticism initiated by Cuba and some African countries in relation to its position on Palestine, black liberation in Namibia and South Africa, the establishment of the New International Economic Order and the Strategic Defense Initiative. The Agency believed that the event would help NAM member states to prepare a coordinated approach at the United Nations General Assembly session. It also described SFR Yugoslavia as a frontrunner for the upcoming 8th Summit of the Non-Aligned Movement (the country would eventually host the 9th Summit), expecting it to become the first country in history to host the summit twice. It noted Belgrade's unwillingness to more explicitly distance itself from the radical wing of the movement, worried about its position in the movement as one of only three European member states.

== Participants ==
=== Member states ===
Participating member states were:

- Afghanistan
- Algeria
- Angola
- Argentina
- Bahrain
- Bangladesh
- Benin
- Bhutan
- Bolivia
- Botswana
- Burkina Faso
- Burundi
- Cameroon
- Cape Verde
- Central African Republic
- Chad
- Colombia
- Comoros
- Republic of the Congo (Congo-Brazzaville)
- Cyprus
- Cuba
- North Korea
- Democratic Yemen
- Djibouti
- Egypt
- Equatorial Guinea
- Ethiopia
- Gabon
- Gambia
- Ghana
- Guinea
- Guinea-Bissau
- Guyana
- India
- Indonesia
- Iran
- Iraq
- Ivory Coast
- Jamaica
- Jordan
- Kenya
- Kuwait
- Laos
- Lebanon
- Lesotho
- Liberia
- Libya
- Madagascar
- Malawi
- Malaysia
- Maldives
- Mali
- Malta
- Mauritania
- Mauritius
- Morocco
- Mozambique
- Nepal
- Nicaragua
- Niger
- Nigeria
- Oman
- Palestine Liberation Organization
- Pakistan
- Panama
- Peru
- Qatar
- Rwanda
- Sao Tome and Principe
- Saudi Arabia
- Senegal
- Seychelles
- Sierra Leone
- Singapore
- Somalia
- Sri Lanka
- Sudan
- Suriname
- South West Africa People's Organization
- Syria
- Togo
- Trinidad and Tobago
- Tunisia
- United Arab Emirates
- Tanzania
- Vanuatu
- Vietnam
- Yemen
- SFR Yugoslavia
- Zaire, later Congo-Kinshasa (post-1997)
- Zambia
- Zimbabwe

=== Observers ===
Participating observers were: Brazil, Philippines, Mexico, United Nations, Organisation of African Unity, African National Congress, Pan Africanist Congress of Azania, Dominican Republic, Uruguay and Venezuela.

=== Guests ===
Guest delegations at the event were:

- Austria
- Finland
- Holy See
- Portugal
- Romania
- Spain
- Sweden
- Switzerland
- Afro-Asian People's Solidarity Organisation
- Arab League
- Organization of the Islamic Conference
- International Committee of the Red Cross
- UNESCO
- United Nations Council for Namibia
- United Nations Development Programme
- United Nations Industrial Development Organization

== See also ==
- Foreign relations of Angola
