= 18th Summit of the Non-Aligned Movement =

2019 Baku summit conference

- The summit's official logo
- Host country: Azerbaijan
- Dates: 25–26 October 2019
- Motto: Upholding Bandung principles to ensure a concerted and adequate response to the challenges of the contemporary world
- Cities: Baku
- Website: www.namazerbaijan.org

The 18th Summit of the Non-Aligned Movement was held October 25–26, 2019 in Baku, Azerbaijan. The summit was attended by the delegation from more than 120 countries.

The summit's framework was the "Final Document" adopted during the Ministerial Meeting of the Non-Aligned Movement Coordinating Bureau which was held in Caracas, Venezuela, from 18 to 21 July.

The head of the foreign policy department of the Presidential Administration of Azerbaijan also said that the agenda would primarily consist of issues on international peace and security.

The summit consisted of two preceding events: a "Senior Officials Meeting" on 21 and 22 October 2019, and a "Ministerial Meeting" on 23 and 24 October 2019. The leaders’ summit took place on 25 and 26 October. Venezuelan President Nicolas Maduro officially handed the presidency of the Non-Aligned Movement (NAM) to Azerbaijani President Ilham Aliyev, during the inaugural ceremony of Leaders' Meeting. Azerbaijan will hold the NAM presidency for 3 years until the 19th summit in 2022.

== Overview ==
The Non-Aligned Movement (NAM) is a forum that is not formally aligned with or against any major power bloc. After the United Nations, it is the largest grouping of states worldwide.

Drawing on the principles agreed at the Bandung Conference in 1955, the NAM was established in 1961 in Belgrade, Yugoslavia through the initiative of President of Yugoslavia Josip Broz Tito, President of Egypt Gamal Abdel Nasser, Prime Minister of India Jawaharlal Nehru, President of Indonesia Sukarno, and President of Ghana Kwame Nkrumah.

After the breakup of Yugoslavia, a founding member, its membership was suspended in 1992 at the regular ministerial meeting held in New York during the regular annual session of the United Nations General Assembly.

As of October 2019, the organization consists of 120 member states, including the non-UN member state of Palestine, as well as 17 other observer countries and 10 observer organizations.

Approximately, two-thirds of the United Nations' members are represented at the Non-Aligned Movement, and they comprise 55% of the world's population.

== Arrangement ==
Baku Convention Center, venue of the 18th Summit of the Non-Aligned Movement

The 18th Summit was decided to be conducted in the capital of Azerbaijan, Baku at the 17th Non-Aligned Movement (NAM) summit held in Venezuela. The summit was scheduled to be held on October 25–26.

Organizing Committee for hosting the 18th Summit of the heads of states and governments of the member countries of the Non-Aligned Movement was established according to the Decree of the President Ilham Aliyev on February 11, 2019.

The "Senior Officials Meeting" and "Ministerial Meeting" convened at the Boulevard Hotel Baku. The summit was held at the Baku Convention Center.

== Participants ==
During his welcoming speech, President Ilham Aliyev stated that heads of state and governments of nearly 60 countries, and overall representatives of around 160 countries and international organizations being attended at the Summit. Among the heads of states and governments followings took part in the Summit.

| Country | Dignitary | Designation |
Members
| Afghanistan | Ashraf Ghani | President |
| Algeria | Abdelkader Bensalah | Acting President |
| Antigua and Barbuda | Paul Chet Greene | Minister of Foreign Affairs, Trade and Barbuda Affairs |
| Azerbaijan | Ilham Aliyev (host) | President |
| Bahrain | Khalid bin Ahmed Al Khalifa | Minister of Foreign Affairs |
| Bangladesh | Sheikh Hasina | Prime Minister |
| Belarus | Vladimir Andreichenko | Chairman of the House of Representatives |
| Bhutan | Sonam Tshong | Foreign Secretary |
| Brunei | Erywan Yusof | Second Minister of Foreign Affairs |
| Burundi | Ezéchiel Nibigira | Minister of Foreign Affairs and Development Cooperation |
| Cambodia | Hor Namhong | Deputy Prime Minister |
| Cameroon | Adoum Gargoum | Minister Delegate for Foreign Affairs |
| Cuba | Miguel Díaz-Canel | President |
| Djibouti | Ismaïl Omar Guelleh | President |
| Egypt | Sameh Shoukry | Minister of Foreign Affairs |
| Equatorial Guinea | Teodoro Obiang Nguema Mbasogo | President |
| Eritrea | Sophia Tesfamariam Yohannes | Permanent Representative to the United Nations |
| Eswatini | Mswati III | King |
| Ethiopia | Markos Tekle | State Minister of Foreign Affairs |
| Ghana | Nana Akufo-Addo | President |
| Guyana | Karen Cummings | Minister of Foreign Affairs and International Cooperation |
| India | Venkaiah Naidu | Vice President |
| Iran | Hassan Rouhani | President |
| Jordan | Ayman Safadi | Minister of Foreign Affairs |
| Kenya | Ababu Namwamba | Chief Administrative Secretary for Foreign Affairs |
| Kuwait | Sabah Al-Khalid Al-Sabah | Deputy Prime Minister |
| Libya | Fayez al-Sarraj | Chairman of the Presidential Council |
| Malaysia | Tun Mahathir Mohamad | Prime Minister |
| Maldives | Abdulla Shahid | Minister of Foreign Affairs |
| Mauritania | Ismail Ould Cheikh Ahmed | Minister of Foreign Affairs, Cooperation and Mauritanians Abroad |
| Mauritius | Jagdish Koonjul | Permanent Representative to the United Nations |
| Mongolia | Battsetseg Batmunkh | Deputy Minister of Foreign Affairs |
| Myanmar | Kyaw Tin | Minister of International Cooperation |
| Namibia | Hage Geingob | President |
| Nepal | K. P. Sharma Oli | Prime Minister |
| Nicaragua | Denis Moncada | Minister of Foreign Affairs |
| North Korea | Choe Ryong-hae | Chairman of the Standing Committee of the Supreme People's Assembly |
| Oman | Yahya bin Mahfoudh al-Mantheri | Chairman of the Council of State |
| Pakistan | Arif Alvi | President |
| Palestine | Riyad al-Maliki | Minister of Foreign Affairs and Expatriates |
| Qatar | Sultan bin Saad bin Sultan Al Muraikhi | Minister of State for Foreign Affairs |
| Singapore | Maliki Osman | Senior Minister of State for Foreign Affairs |
| South Africa | Naledi Pandor | Minister of International Relations and Cooperation |
| Sri Lanka | Tilak Marapana | Minister of Foreign Affairs |
| Sudan | Abdel Fattah al-Burhan | Chairman of the Transitional Military Council |
| Syria | Faisal Mekdad | Deputy Minister of Foreign Affairs and Expatriates |
| Thailand | Vijavat Isarabhakdi | Vice Minister of Foreign Affairs |
| Tunisia | Hatem Ferjani | Secretary of State for Economic Diplomacy |
| Turkmenistan | Gurbanguly Berdimuhamedow | President |
| Uganda | Sam Kutesa | Minister of Foreign Affairs |
| United Arab Emirates | Anwar Gargash | Minister of State for Foreign Affairs |
| Venezuela | Nicolás Maduro | President |
| Vietnam | Đặng Thị Ngọc Thịnh | Vice President |
| Zambia | Joseph Malanji | Minister of Foreign Affairs |
Observers
| Bosnia and Herzegovina | Milorad Dodik | Member of the Presidency |
| Russia | Sergey Vershinin | Deputy Minister of Foreign Affairs |
| Serbia | Ivica Dačić | Deputy Prime Minister |
| South Korea | Kim Tong Op | Ambassador to Azerbaijan |
| Tajikistan | Khusrav Noziri | First Deputy Minister of Foreign Affairs |
| Turkey | Mevlüt Çavuşoğlu | Minister of Foreign Affairs |
Organisational leaders
| Turkic Council | Baghdad Amreyev | Secretary-General |
| United Nations | Tijjani Muhammad-Bande | President of the General Assembly |

President of UN General Assembly Tijjani Muhammad-Bande and the President of the International Committee of the Red Cross Peter Maurer also attended the event.

Overall 164 delegations with more than 2700 delegates attended at the Summit.

== Pre-summit responses ==
According to Deputy Foreign Minister Ramiz Hasanov, the participation of heads of 60 states and governments in the Baku Summit of NAM was confirmed.

The Vice President of India commented on the significance of the summit being held in Azerbaijan under the motto “Upholding Bandung principles to ensure a concerted and adequate response to the challenges of the contemporary world” as it pertains to the approaching 65th anniversary of Bandung Principles in 2020 and the 60th anniversary of the establishment of the Movement in 2021.

== Agenda ==
The summit's framework was the "Final Document" adopted during the Ministerial Meeting of the Non-Aligned Movement Coordinating Bureau which was held in Caracas, Venezuela, from 18 to 21 July.

The head of the foreign policy department of the Presidential Administration also said that the agenda would primarily consist of issues on international peace and security.

Foreign Minister Elmar Mammadyarov opened the second meeting and highlighted youth empowerment to be one of the priority areas during Azerbaijan's chairmanship, as well as first-ever NAM Youth Summit to be held in Baku on October 24, 2019. He also mentioned “increasing youth participation in public administration, addressing their social, education and employment problems, as well as more active engagement of youth in achieving the goals and targets of the 2030 Sustainable Development Agenda” focused on the Final documents of the NAM Summit and Ministerial meetings.

=== Senior Officials Meeting ===
The Senior Officials Meeting was held on 21 and 22 October 2019. The officials discussed the final document of the Summit, as well as a joint statement of NAM leaders and two documents to be presented for foreign ministers’ meeting.

=== Ministerial Meeting ===
The Ministerial Meeting with the presence of foreign ministers of NAM countries was held on 23 and 24 October 2019. Venezuela's Foreign Minister Jorge Alberto Arreaza Montserrat, handed the presidency of the ministerial meeting for three years at the opening ceremony of the meeting. After opening remark of Elmar Mammadyarov and listening to the report of Senior Officials Meeting which was delivered by George Arreaza, the ministers starts to review the documents (Final Document, Baku Declaration, Declaration on Palestine and the General Report).

=== Leaders’ Summit ===
On 25 October, the summit was inaugurated by the President of Azerbaijan Ilham Aliyev. Then the Venezuelan President, Nicolas Maduro, as the chair of the 17th summit declared the opening of the 18th summit and presented the report of NAM's chairmanship during the past three years. Maduro officially handed the presidency of the Non-Aligned Movement to the Azerbaijani President, Ilham Aliyev. After Maduro, President of Azerbaijan Ilham Aliyev, President of the 74th session of the General Assembly of United Nations Tijjani Muhammad-Bande, UN Under-Secretary-General for Political and Peacebuilding Affairs Rosemary DiCarlo, Chair of the Group of 77 Riyad Mansour, and Azerbaijan's Minister of Foreign Affairs Elmar Mammadyarov delivered their opening speeches.

Inaugurating the summit, Azerbaijani President Aliyev condemned changing borders by force, violating the territorial integrity of countries by force, and interfering in internal affairs as “unacceptable”.

Following Aliyev's remarks, the United Nations General Assembly Tijjani Muhammad-Bande appreciated the contribution of NAM to the achievements of the United Nations for strengthening “the principles of the Charter of the United Nations – through opposition against colonialism, racism, hegemony, aggression, as well as foreign intervention and/or occupation”.

In her speech, Rosemary DiCarlo welcomed NAM's focus on the challenge of disarmament and non-proliferation, also highlighted the 2030 Agenda for Sustainable Development goals “in reducing inequality, in addressing the climate crisis, in tackling global hunger, in achieving gender equality and in expanding opportunity for young people”.

Iranian President Hassan Rouhani criticized United States’ efforts “to impose on the world a unipolar and hegemonic order under the slogan of the new global system with reliance on its military, economic and media power”, as well as its monetary policy “to put political pressure on independent states”

India's Vice President Muppavarapu Venkaiah Naidu called for fighting against all forms of terrorism and spread of violent extremism. He expressed the deep concern over Pakistan's behavior in terms of Jammu and Kashmir issue.

Cuba's President Miguel Diaz-Canel stated Cuba's solidarity with the peoples “who fight for rejection of America's unilateral decisions in support of Israel and against Iran; and the call to end the war against the Syrian people and find a comprehensive, just and lasting solution to the Israeli-Palestinian conflict”.

Within the framework of the Non-Aligned Movement Summit, four documents were signed:

- Baku Final Outcome Document
- Baku Declaration
- Motion of Thanks and Solidarity with the People of and Government of the Republic of Azerbaijan
- Declaration on Palestine
- Declaration on Bolivia

The summit's final document ratified on October 26 by the 120 members of NAM, emphasizes strengthen NAM solidarity in combating terrorism while highlighting that terrorism should not be associated with any religion, nationality, civilization or ethnic group. It declared the central importance of the development dimensions in trade negotiations and maintain that a successful conclusion of the Doha Development Round. Besides, it condemns promulgation and application of unilateral coercive measures against Member States of the Movement. Member states called serious, collective efforts to bring a complete end to the Israeli occupation of the Palestinian territory occupied since 1967, including East Jerusalem, in accordance with and in full respect of international law. In addition, Member States expressed their regret in regard with the conflict between Armenia and Azerbaijan, Nagorno Karabakh remains unresolved and continues to threaten international and regional peace and security despite the United Nations Security Council resolutions.

== Other events ==
=== Youth Summit ===
The Youth Summit of the Non-Aligned Movement was organized for the first time in NAM's history in Baku on October 24 on the initiative of Azerbaijan. Youth from 40 countries participated at the Summit. Recommendations to the Summit of Heads of State and Government were presented as a result of the Youth Summit. In addition, establishing NAM Youth Network was initiated.

== See also ==
- Seventy-fourth session of the United Nations General Assembly
