= 2nd Summit of the Non-Aligned Movement =

1964 Cairo summit conference

Summit Conference of Heads of State or Government of the Non-Aligned Movement
- Host country: United Arab Republic
- Date: 5–10 October 1964
- Cities: Cairo
- Participants: Afghanistan Algeria; Angola; Burma; Burundi; Cambodia; Cameroon; Central African Republic; Ceylon; Chad; Congo; Cuba; Cyprus; Dahomey; Ethiopia; Ghana; Guinea; India; Indonesia; Iraq; Jordan; Kenya; Kuwait; Laos; Lebanon; Liberia; Libya; Mali; Malawi; Mauritania; Morocco; Nepal; Nigeria; Rwanda; Saudi Arabia; Senegal; Sierra Leone; Somalia; Sudan; Syria; Tanzania; Togo; Tunisia; Uganda; UAR; North Yemen; Yugoslavia Northern Rhodesia
- Chair: Gamal Abdel Nasser (President of Egypt)
- Follows: 1st Summit (Belgrade, Yugoslavia)
- Precedes: 3rd Summit (Lusaka, Zambia)

Second Summit Conference of Heads of State or Government of the Non-Aligned Movement on 5–10 October 1964 in Cairo, United Arab Republic (Egypt) was the second conference of the Non-Aligned Movement which followed the Belgrade Conference of 1961 and preceded the Lusaka Conference of 1970. Cairo was selected as the host city at the preparatory meeting held in Colombo, Ceylon, on March 23, 1964. At the beginning of the conference, the chairmanship of the movement was transferred from the President of Yugoslavia Josip Broz Tito to the President of Egypt Gamal Abdel Nasser.

In his opening remarks, Nasser commented on the shifting international context since the first summit in Belgrade in 1961. He said non-alignment is not the third bloc but instead opposition to bloc divisions, and is active rather than passive policy. He called for the abolition of direct and hidden imperialism, action on socio-economic inequalities, and prevention of future obstructions by major powers to colonies negotiating their independence.

President of Indonesia Sukarno commented on peaceful coexistence among major powers, whose direct confrontation would lead to mutual destruction. He nevertheless noted the stagnant or even worsening security situation for developing countries, particularly in Southeast Asia, Middle East, Cyprus, Congo and Latin America. President of Yugoslavia Josip Broz Tito welcomed the participation of new countries, which he believed would lead to a widening support for non-alignment, peace and coexistence. He called for a strengthening of international peace and definitive abolition of colonialism, international disarmament and more equal development. President of Ghana Kwame Nkrumah identified four major causes of internal tensions: the division of Germany and Berlin; anticolonial liberation struggles; Cold War ideological divisions; and the superpower arms race. The Prime Minister of India underlined five steps for non-aligned action, including nuclear disarmament, peaceful resolution of border disputes, freedom from foreign domination, aggression, subversion and racial discrimination, faster development, and full support for the United Nations. The President of Revolutionary Government of Angola in Exile Holden Roberto stated that there can be no peace in a country whose people are exposed to oppression.

== Issues discussed ==
=== Universalist and Regionalist approach to membership ===
One of the prominent issues resolved at the Cairo conference was membership criteria for the movement. Yugoslavia advocated for a universalist approach, in which the movement would be open to all the non-aligned countries regardless of geography, notably in Europe and Latin America. Indonesia advocated for a narrower Afro-Asian regionalism. This approach, strongly supported by China, was intended to present the movement as a continuation of the Bandung Conference.

At the time, the two approaches competed with an Indonesian-Chinese plan to organize the Second Bandung Conference in late 1963 or early 1964 and an Indian, Egyptian and Yugoslav plan for the second Non-Aligned conference. Indonesia and China strongly criticized the idea of the Non-Aligned conference as counterproductive to Bandung, whilst Prime Minister of Sri Lanka Sirimavo Bandaranaike confronted those criticisms by stressing the indivisibility of world peace. The situation created parallelism in initiatives with preparatory meeting for the Second Non-Aligned Summit taking place in Colombo and the Second Bandung preparatory meeting taking place with delay in Jakarta.

The Second Bandung preparatory meeting was ultimately supported by only Ghana, Iran, Cambodia, Guinea and Mali (Cambodia, Guinea and Mali supported both initiatives). Participants of the second Bandung preparatory meeting proposed that the second meeting should take place in Africa on 10 March 1965 in a country determined by the Organization of African Unity, but it never took place due to Sino-Soviet split and 1965 Algerian coup d'état.

== Participants ==
57 countries participated in the summit, 10 of which had the observer status. All 25 countries participating in the Belgrade Conference were invited to attend the conference in Cairo as well as all Charter of the Organization of African Unity parties, Arab countries in attendance of the 1964 Arab League Summit as well as Malawi, Laos, Jamaica, Trinidad and Tobago, Argentina, Bolivia, Brazil, Chile, Mexico, Uruguay, Venezuela, Austria, Finland, and Sweden. The invitations for Zambia and British Guiana were conditioned on their declaration of independence by October 1964. The provisional government of Holden Roberto and other African provisional governments were invited as well. 26 countries were represented by their respective head of state and 10 by head of government.

=== Member States ===
The following countries participated as full member states.

- Afghanistan (Mohammed Yusuf, Prime Minister of Afghanistan)
- Algeria (Ahmed Ben Bella, President of Algeria)
- Angola (Holden Roberto, President of the Revolutionary Government of Angola in Exile)
- Burma (U Ti Han, Foreign Affairs Minister)
- Burundi (Albin Nyamoya, Prime Minister of Burundi)
- Cambodia (Norodom Kantol, President of the Royal Government)
- Cameroon (Ahmadou Ahidjo, President of Cameroon)
- Central African Republic (Marcel Douzima: State Secretary)
- Ceylon (Sirimavo Bandaranaike, Prime Minister of Ceylon)
- Chad (Jacques Baroum, Health Minister)
- PR Congo (Alphonse Massamba-Débat, President of the Republic of the Congo)
- Cuba (Osvaldo Dorticós Torrado, President of Cuba)
- Cyprus (Archbishop Makarios, President of Cyprus)
- Dahomey (Sourou Migan Apithy, President of Dahomey)
- Ethiopia (Haile Selassie: Emperor of Ethiopia)
- Ghana (Kwame Nkrumah, President of Ghana)
- Guinea (Ahmed Sekou Toure, President of Guinea)
- India (Lal Bahadur Shastri, Prime Minister of India)
- Indonesia (Sukarno, President of Indonesia)
- Iraq (Abdul Salam Arif, President of Iraq)
- Jordan (King Hussein of Jordan)
- Kenya (Joseph Murumbi, Minister of Foreign Affairs)
- Kuwait (Abdullah El Salem El Sabah, Minister)
- Laos (Prince Souvanna Phouma, Prime Minister of Laos)
- Lebanon (Charles Helou, Prime Minister of Lebanon)
- Liberia (William Tubman, President of Liberia)
- Libya (Crown Prince El Hassan El Reda El Senoussi)
- Mali (Modibo Keïta, President of Mali)
- Malawi
- Mauritania (Moktar Ould Daddah, President of Mauritania)
- Morocco (Ahmed Balafrei, Minister of Foreign Affairs of Morocco)
- Nepal (Mahendra, King of Nepal)
- Nigeria (Nuhu Bamalli, Minister of Foreign Affairs of Nigeria)
- Rwanda
- Saudi Arabia (Prince Faisal of Saudi Arabia, Prime Minister of Saudi Arabia)
- Senegal (Doudou Thiam, Foreign Minister of Senegal)
- Sierra Leone (Cyril B. Rogers-Wright, Minister of Foreign Affairs of Sierra Leone)
- Somalia (Aden Adde, President of Somalia)
- Sudan (Ibrahim Abboud, President of the Supreme Military Council)
- Syria (Amin al-Hafiz, President of the Revolutionary Council)
- Tanzania (Rashid Kawawa, Vice-President of Tanzania)
- Togo (George Apedo-Amah, Minister of Foreign Affairs of Togo)
- Tunisia (Habib Bourguiba, President of Tunisia)
- Uganda (Milton Obote, Prime Minister of Uganda)
- UAR (Gamal Abdel Nasser, President of the United Arab Republic)
- North Yemen (Abdullah al-Sallal, President of North Yemen)
- Yugoslavia (Josip Broz Tito, President of Yugoslavia)
- Zambia (Kenneth Kaunda, President of Zambia)

=== Observers ===
The following countries participated as observers.

- Argentina (Carlos Maria Bollini Shaw, Ambassador)
- Bolivia (Antonio Seleme Vargas, General)
- Brazil (Sergio Armando Frazao, Ambassador in Cairo)
- Chile (Raul Molina)
- Finland (Veli Helenius, Secretary General of the Ministry of Foreign Affairs of Finland)
- Jamaica (E.R.Richardson, Permanent Representative of Jamaica at the United Nations)
- Mexico (Manuel Moreno Sánchez, Senator)
- Trinidad and Tobago (Ellis Clarke, Permanent Representative of Trinidad and Tobago at the United Nations)
- Uruguay
- Venezuela (Octavio Lepage, Ambassador to Belgium)

== See also ==
- Egypt and the Non-Aligned Movement
- Foreign relations of Egypt
