= 50th Anniversary Additional Commemorative Non-Aligned Meeting =

Non-Aligned Movement Summit

50th Anniversary Additional Commemorative Non-Aligned Meeting Додатни комеморативни сусрет Покрета несврстаних на 50. годишњицу оснивања / Dodatni komemorativni susret Pokreta nesvrstanih na 50. godišnjicu osnivanja (Serbian)
- Host country: Serbia
- Date: September 5, 2011 – September 6, 2011
- Cities: Belgrade
- Venues: House of the National Assembly of the Republic of Serbia
- Chair: Boris Tadić (President of Serbia)

50th Anniversary Additional Commemorative Non-Aligned Meeting was a Non-Aligned Movement foreign ministers commemorative meeting which took place on 5–6 September 2011 in Belgrade, Serbia. The meeting occurred in the House of the National Assembly of the Republic of Serbia, the building which hosted the 1st Summit of the Non-Aligned Movement on 5–12 June 1961 (at the time as the Parliament of Yugoslavia) during the existence of the Socialist Federal Republic of Yugoslavia. The idea for the meeting was proposed by the President of Serbia Boris Tadić during his participation at the 15th Summit of the Non-Aligned Movement in Sharm el-Sheikh in Egypt. Some 600 delegates, representing over 100 national delegations, attended the meeting.

At the opening of th meeting, Minister of Foreign Affairs of Egypt Mohamed Kamel Amr said the meeting was “an indicator of the strength of our movement and we are grateful to the founders, the historic leaders who led our movement”. In his speech, President of Serbia Tadić underlined that his country has increased UN peacekeeping contribution in a number of NAM countries and established a “World in Serbia” scholarship fund enabling hundreds each year to study at the University of Belgrade. Minister of Foreign Affairs and Trade of Brunei Prince Mohamed Bolkiah stated that the city of Belgrade is linked forever to the Non-Aligned Movement.

One of the motivations for the meeting was to discuss the Kosovo independence precedent with member states of the movement. Croatia, one of the six former Yugoslav republics, underlined its plans to actively participate in the conference, stressing that Zagreb believes that its forthcoming accession to the European Union does not rule out development of its relations with NAM member states. Alongside Croatia, Slovenia, Montenegro and FYR Macedonia among former Yugoslav states attended the event. The Egyptian Minister of Foreign Affairs called all former Yugoslav countries who had yet to recognize Palestine as an independent country to do so. Other European countries in attendance as guests were Hungary, Finland, Spain and Cyprus, the last of which was a member state in parallel with Yugoslavia until 2004.

== See also ==
- Yugoslavia and the Non-Aligned Movement
- 60th Anniversary Additional Commemorative Non-Aligned Meeting
