= 3rd Summit of the Non-Aligned Movement =

1970 Lusaka summit conference

Summit Conference of Heads of State or Government of the Non-Aligned Movement

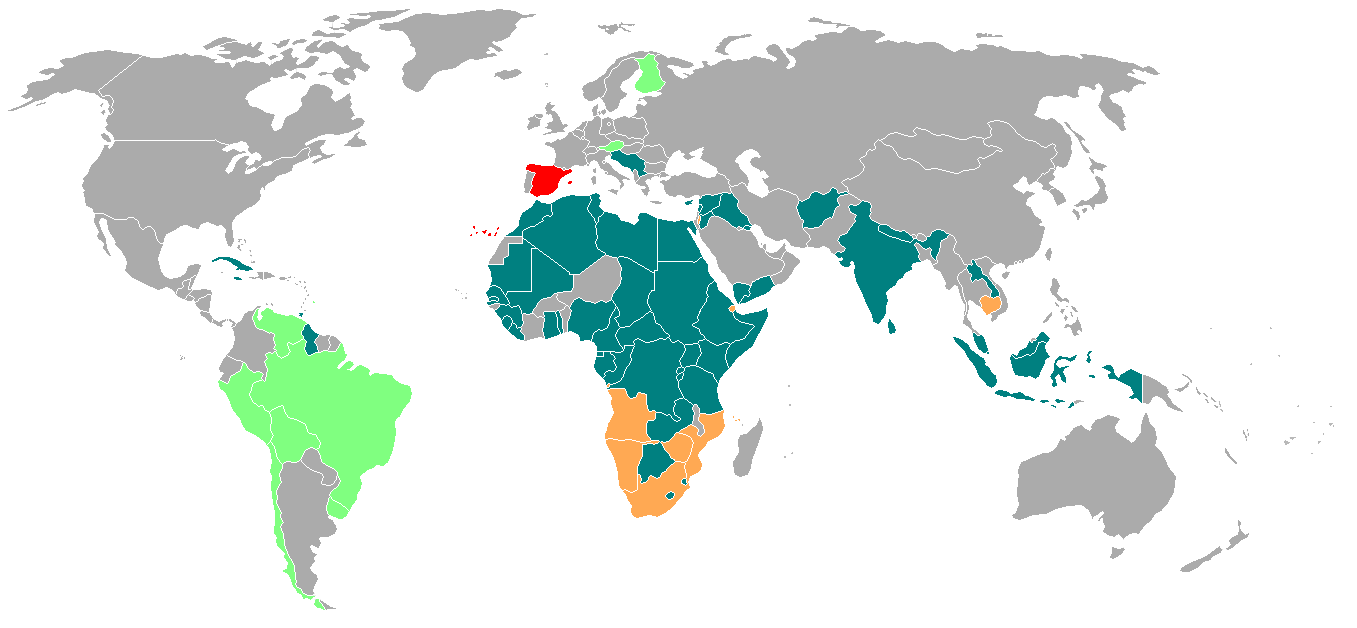
- : Member states : Observers : Liberation movements & rival delegations (Cambodia) : Rejected participation
- Host country: Zambia
- Date: 8–10 September 1970
- Cities: Lusaka
- Participants: Afghanistan Algeria; Botswana; Burundi; Cameroon; Central African Republic; Ceylon; Chad; PR Congo; DR Congo; Cuba; Cyprus; Equatorial Guinea; Ethiopia; Gabon; Gambia; Ghana; Guinea; Guyana; India; Indonesia; Iraq; Jamaica; Jordan; Kenya; Kuwait; Laos; Lebanon; Lesotho; Liberia; Libya; Malaysia; Mali; Mauritania; Morocco; Nepal; Nigeria; Rwanda; Senegal; Sierra Leone; Singapore; Somalia; Sudan; Swaziland; Syria; Tanzania; Togo; Trinidad and Tobago; Tunisia; Uganda; Egypt; North Yemen; South Yemen; Yugoslavia Zambia
- Chair: Kenneth Kaunda (President of Zambia)
- Follows: 2nd Summit (Cairo, Egypt)
- Precedes: 4th Summit (Algiers, Algeria)

Third Conference of the Non-Aligned Movement on 8–10 September 1970 in Lusaka, Zambia was the third conference of the Non-Aligned Movement. A preparatory meeting of Foreign Ministers drafted a number of resolutions which were considered by the Summit Conference. President of Zambia Kenneth Kaunda opened the conference by stating non-alignment was "the natural choice at the time of increased hostility created by ideological conflicts in the bipolar world."

The conference was organized in the context of the development of the policy of Détente which led to reduced tensions between the Soviet Union and the United States. However, increased cooperation between the superpowers was perceived as potentially undermining the initiative of Third World countries. It was organized 6 years after the conference in Cairo, which was the longest period between the two conferences. The location for the conference was in part selected to support Zambia, whose sovereignty and borders were threatened by Rhodesia and Apartheid era South Africa.

The conference adopted the "Declaration on Peace, Independence, Development, Cooperation and Democratization of International Relations" and the "Declaration on Non-Alignment and Economic Development".

It also adopted resolutions on issues including: Non-Alignment; the UN, reaffirming its commitment to the UN; Seabed usage, supporting peaceful and scientific usage; Disarmament, advocating nuclear disarmament; Israel, including condemning its intervention in Lebanon, arrest of Algerians, and presence in the occupied territories; a proposed executive mechanism for NAM; Southeast Asia, expressing concern over US involvement; Decolonization, calling on France and Spain to complete it; Racial discrimination; and condemning the situation in South Africa, Portuguese colonies, Rhodesia, and Namibia. Yugoslavia was, in part, dissatisfied with the strong focus of African issues, which prevented further discussion on issues in Latin America and Europe.

The conference was commended by international leaders Alexei Kosygin, Zhou Enlai, Willy Brandt, Walter Ulbricht, Pope Paul VI, Nicolae Ceaușescu and others.

== Preparation ==
15 non-aligned countries met in Belgrade in March 1965 to coordinate their response to the Vietnam War. At the time, developing countries were divided between the supporters of what was known as the regionalist concept (Afro-Asian People's Solidarity Organisation supported at the time by China) and the universalist concept (Non-Aligned Movement). The Non-Aligned concept in the end was more successful, in part due to the cancelation of the 1965 Afro-Asian conference in Algeria due to the 1965 Algerian coup d'état. In 1966, President of Yugoslavia Josip Broz Tito, President of Egypt Gamal Abdel Nasser and Prime Minister of India Indira Gandhi met in New Delhi where they called for more non-aligned solidarity.

The initiative to organize the third conference was formed by the Federal Secretariat of Foreign Affairs of Yugoslavia on 9 May 1968, when the institution published the "Draft Thesis for the Platform of the Conference of Non-Aligned and Peaceful Countries". Zambia was one of the countries which supported the idea to organize the event. To promote the idea, President Tito visited 11 countries in early 1968, including prominent non-aligned members such as India, Egypt and Ethiopia. Request by the Francoist Spain to the Yugoslav representation in Paris to get involved in the movement was perceived as unexpected, but was nevertheless shared with Ethiopia and India (both of which were initially considered for hosting the event) and was ultimately rejected as inappropriate due to Spanish support to Portuguese colonialism. Ethiopia and Yugoslavia were strongly motivated to initiate the event to voice concerns of small states after the August 1968 Warsaw Pact invasion of Czechoslovakia, therefore the Yugoslav Delegation to the United Nations hosted the NAM foreign ministers (59 out of 74 invited attended) at the margins of the Twenty-seventh session of the United Nations General Assembly. At the meeting in Dar es Salaam, countries formally interested in hosting the event were Ethiopia, India, Morocco and Algeria. Arab countries pressured Ethiopia to drop its application, after which Addis Ababa strongly advocated for Zambia. Zambia received 29 votes, whilst Algeria received 23.

The meeting in Dar es Salaam was followed by the Preparatory Meeting for the Third Conference by the NAM Permanent Committee was held in New Delhi, India between 7 and 9 June 1970. Delegates of 16 member states of the NAM Permanent Committee at the time were Algeria, Burundi, Ceylon, Ethiopia, Guyana, India, Indonesia, Iraq, Yugoslavia, Malaysia, Morocco, Senegal, Sudan, Tanzania, United Arab Republic and Zambia. The Committee confirmed Zambia as the host the conference and invited member states with delegations in Lusaka to provide the support needed in the preparation of the event.

Socialist Federal Republic of Yugoslavia (host of the first conference) provided significant support to Zambia in organization of the conference. Four months before the event, President of Zambia (reluctant to invite companies from Western Bloc) invited Belgrade based construction company Energoprojekt holding, asking them to build 4,000-seat convention hall as fast as possible. The project was designed and built simultaneously and 115 days after the works started and two weeks ahead of the deadline, the new convention hall was ready for the event.

== Participants ==
The following states participated at the Conference in Lusaka:

=== Member states ===
- Afghanistan
- Algeria
- Botswana
- Burundi
- Cameroon
- Central African Republic
- Ceylon
- Chad
- PR Congo
- DR Congo
- Cuba
- Cyprus
- Equatorial Guinea
- Ethiopia
- Gabon
- Gambia
- Ghana
- Guinea
- Guyana
- India
- Indonesia
- Iraq
- Jamaica
- Jordan
- Kenya
- Kuwait
- Laos
- Lebanon
- Lesotho
- Liberia
- Libya
- Malaysia
- Mali
- Mauritania
- Morocco
- Nepal
- Nigeria
- Rwanda
- Senegal
- Sierra Leone
- Singapore
- Somalia
- Sudan
- Swaziland
- Syria
- Tanzania
- Togo
- Trinidad and Tobago
- Tunisia
- Uganda
- Egypt
- North Yemen
- South Yemen
- Yugoslavia
- Zambia

=== Observers ===
- Austria
- Barbados
- Bolivia
- Brazil
- Chile
- Finland
- Peru
- Uruguay
- Venezuela
- Afro-Asian People's Solidarity Organisation
- Organisation of African Unity
- Provisional Revolutionary Government of the Republic of South Vietnam

=== Guests ===
- People's Movement for the Liberation of Angola
- South West Africa People's Organisation
- Zimbabwe African National Union
- Zimbabwe African People's Union
- Mozambique Liberation Front
- African National Congress of South Africa
- National Movement for the Liberation of the Comoros Islands
- Front de Libération de la Côte des Somalis
- Palestine Liberation Organisation
- There were 2 rival Cambodian delegations, one representing the Government of General Lon Nol, and the other representing the deposed Prince Norodom Sihanouk.

== Heritage ==
=== 3rd Conference Monument in Lusaka ===
Third Conference Monument in Lusaka
- Location: Lusaka, Zambia
- Opening date: 1970
- Dedicated date: 3rd Summit of the Non-Aligned Movement

The commemorative monument to the 3rd Summit in Lusaka was erected along the Independence Avenue in Lusaka, where it has remained ever since its construction. Drawing inspiration from a temporary installation that was built at Topčider Star in Senjak, Belgrade during the 1st Summit of the Non-Aligned Movement in 1961, this monument embodied the spirit of Non-Aligned cooperation and diplomacy.

== See also ==
- Foreign relations of Zambia
