= 7th Summit of the Non-Aligned Movement =

1983 New Delhi summit conference

7th Summit Conference of Heads of State or Government of the Non-Aligned Movement
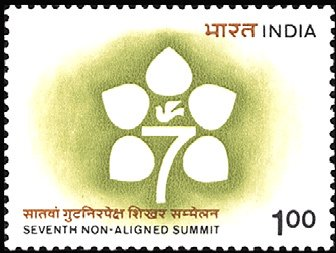

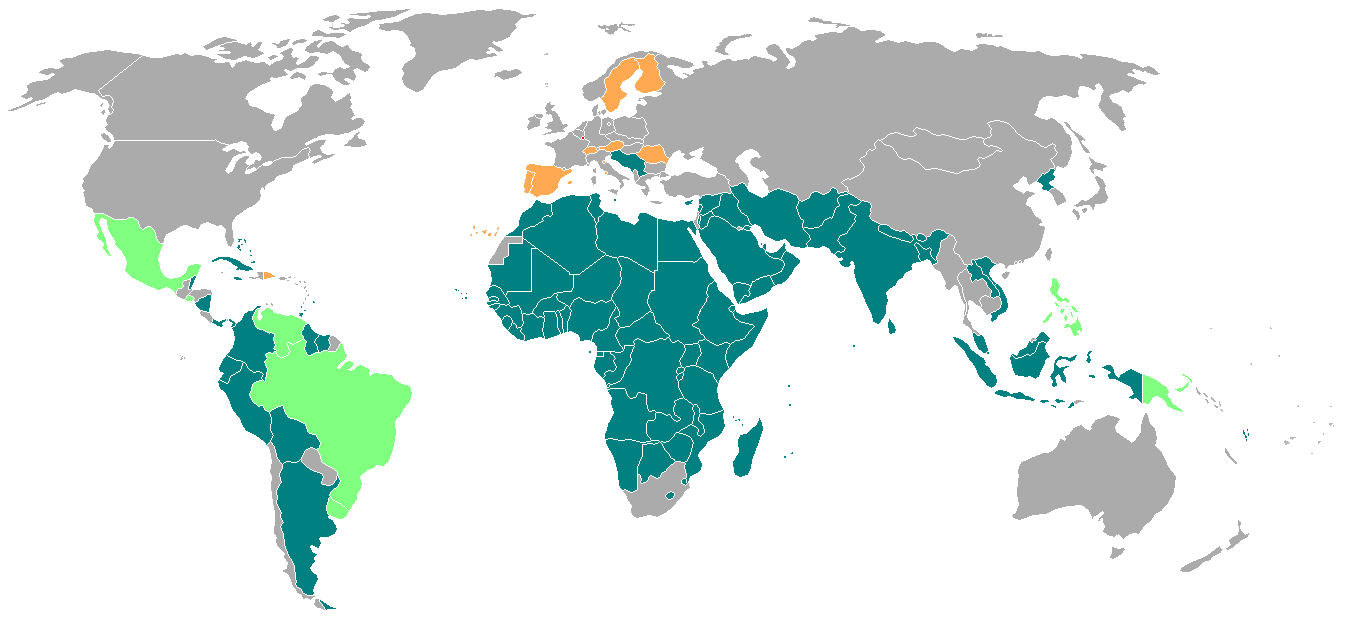
- : Member states : Observers : Guests : Rejected participation
- Host country: India
- Date: 7–12 March 1983
- Cities: New Delhi
- Venues: Vigyan Bhawan
- Chair: Indira Gandhi (Prime Minister of India)
- Follows: 6th Summit (Havana, Cuba)
- Precedes: 8th Summit (Harare, Zimbabwe)

Seventh Summit Conference of Heads of State or Government of the Non-Aligned Movement on 7–12 March 1983 took place in New Delhi in India, one of the founders and leading members of the Non-Aligned Movement. The summit followed the 1979 summit in Havana, Cuba at which confrontation between moderate member states, led by SFR Yugoslavia and India, and radical states, led by Cuba, pushed the movement into crisis. The keynote address was delivered by Prime Minister of India Indira Gandhi. At the summit in New Delhi, Bahamas, Barbados, Colombia and Vanuatu were admitted as new member states; Papua New Guinea and Antigua and Barbuda as observers; and Dominican Republic as a guest state. Cambodia was absent from the meeting due to the rival delegations controversy. Saint Lucia failed to send a delegation. Luxembourg's request for guest status was rejected on formalistic deadline grounds. 1,500 journalists followed the event.

== Participants ==
The following states participated at the summit in New Delhi:

=== Member states ===
- Afghanistan
- Algeria
- Angola
- Argentina
- Bahamas
- Bahrain
- Bangladesh
- Barbados
- Belize
- Benin
- Bhutan
- Bolivia
- Botswana
- Burundi
- Cape Verde
- Central African Republic
- Chad
- Colombia
- Comoros
- Congo
- Cuba
- Cyprus
- North Korea
- Djibouti
- Ecuador
- Egypt
- Equatorial Guinea
- Ethiopia
- Gabon
- Gambia
- Ghana
- Grenada
- Guinea
- Guinea-Bissau
- Guyana
- India
- Indonesia
- Iran
- Iraq
- Ivory Coast
- Jamaica
- Jordan
- Kenya
- Kuwait
- Laos
- Lebanon
- Lesotho
- Liberia
- Libya
- Madagascar
- Malawi
- Malaysia
- Maldives
- Mali
- Malta
- Mauritania
- Mauritius
- Morocco
- Mozambique
- Nepal
- Nicaragua
- Niger
- Nigeria
- Oman
- Pakistan
- Palestine Liberation Organization
- Panama
- Peru
- Qatar
- Rwanda
- São Tomé and Príncipe
- Saudi Arabia
- Senegal
- Seychelles
- Sierra Leone
- Singapore
- Somalia
- South West Africa People’s Organisation
- Sri Lanka
- Sudan
- Suriname
- Swaziland
- Syria
- Togo
- Trinidad and Tobago
- Tunisia
- Uganda
- United Arab Emirates
- Cameroon
- Tanzania
- Upper Volta
- Vanuatu
- Vietnam
- North Yemen
- South Yemen
- Yugoslavia
- Zaire
- Zambia
- Zimbabwe

=== Observers ===
- Brazil
- El Salvador
- Mexico
- Papua New Guinea
- Philippines
- Uruguay
- Venezuela
- African National Congress
- Afro-Asian People's Solidarity Organisation
- League of Arab States
- Organization of African Unity
- Organization of the Islamic Conference
- Pan Africanist Congress of Azania
- Socialist Party of Puerto Rico
- United Nations

=== Guests ===
- Austria
- Dominican Republic
- Finland
- Portugal
- Romania
- San Marino
- Spain
- Sweden
- Switzerland
- Holy See
- Economic and Social Commission for Asia and the Pacific
- Food and Agriculture Organization
- Red Cross
- International Conference on the Question of Palestine
- United Nations Ad Hoc Committee on the Indian Ocean
- United Nations Commissioner for Namibia
- United Nations Cormnittee on the Exercise of the Inalienable Rights Of the Palestinian People
- United Nations Council for Namibia
- United Nations Conference on Trade and Development
- United Nations Development Program
- United Nations Educational Scientific and Cultural Organization
- United Nations Industrial Development Organization
- United Nations Special Committee against Apartheid
- Special Committee on Decolonization
- World Food Council
- World Health Organization

== See also ==
- India and the Non-Aligned Movement
- Foreign relations of India
- Commonwealth Heads of Government Meeting 1983
