= 8th Summit of the Non-Aligned Movement =

1986 Harare summit conference

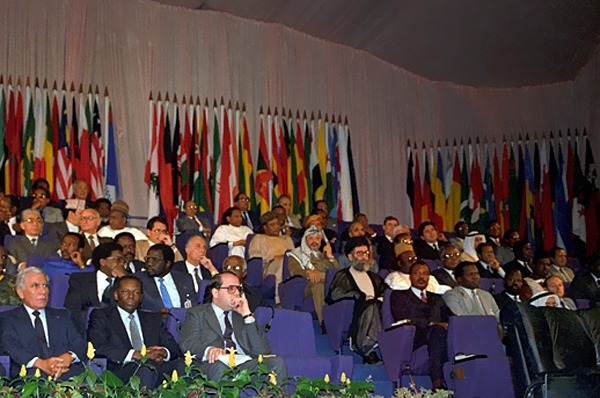
- Delegates at the Summit
- Host country: Zimbabwe
- Date: 1–6 September 1986
- Cities: Harare
- Chair: Canaan Banana (President of Zimbabwe)
- Follows: 7th Summit of the Non-Aligned Movement (New Delhi, India)
- Precedes: 9th Summit of the Non-Aligned Movement (Belgrade, Yugoslavia)

8th Summit of the Non-Aligned Movement on 1–6 September 1986 in Harare, Zimbabwe was the conference of heads of state or government of the Non-Aligned Movement. 101 countries took part in the summit, 51 of which were African countries. An explicit call for South–South cooperation appeared for the first time in the 1986 NAM final declaration.

The issue of Apartheid regime in neighboring South Africa was the dominant issue on the agenda of the summit. At the same time, Pretoria tried to influence some NAM members to send low ranking delegates to the summit in Harare. All participating states unanimously adopted a charter on economic sanctions against the South African racist regime. Oliver Tambo called Harare the "capital city of the anti-colonial struggle [where] the apartheid system will meet its day of reckoning".

United States announced the cut-off of development aid to Zimbabwe while the event was taking place. The event was mostly ignored by the western media while it was taking place.

Similarly to an earlier NAM summit in Lusaka, the venue for the event was built by the Yugoslav construction company Energoprojekt holding . At the same time, SFR Yugoslavia, which was historically one of the most prominent members of the movement, was now faced with a post-Tito complex internal federal power-sharing which negatively influenced the delegation leadership. Yugoslavia was represented by underprepared Sinan Hasani from the Socialist Autonomous Province of Kosovo, who was generally unknown among the other Yugoslav NAM partners and who heavily relied on materials prepared by the Federal Secretary of Foreign Affairs.

In this context, leader of Libya Muammar Gaddafi attracted the most attention among the guests at the summit. The Libyan delegation arrived to Harare with 250 members, circulated the idea of Libya's association with the Warsaw Pact, which was opposed by other NAM countries, and used strong anti-Americanism in its statements.

This development increased fears among the core members of the movement that the progressive countries would revive their ideas about "a natural alliance" with the Eastern bloc, from the 6th Summit in Havana. Progressive members proposed or supported North Korea as a host for the next foreign ministers conference and Nicaragua as a host of the next summit. To avoid an uncomfortable situation in which countries would either support or oppose sole Nicaraguan candidature, Indonesia submitted a strategic application to host the next summit, which led to the absence of consensus until the following meeting. India, Zambia and Iraq at the same time strongly opposed the idea of a foreign ministers conference in North Korea. The compromise solution was reached by Yugoslavia, India, Cuba and Zambia in which North Korea secured the right to host a special meeting on economic issues whilst the 1988 Non-Aligned Foreign Ministers Conference was organized in Nicosia, Cyprus.

In 1983, at the start of preparation for the summit, the government initiated Operation Chinyavada (scorpion) in which 3,000 women were rounded up by the police at night and sent to the Zambezi Valley for "moral re-education" under the accusation of engaging in prostitution. Following public outcry, it led to the establishment of the Women’s Action Group and some subsequent women's rights organizations.

== See also ==
- Zimbabwe and the Non-Aligned Movement
- 3rd Summit of the Non-Aligned Movement
- "Josip Broz Tito" Art Gallery of the Nonaligned Countries
