= Non-Aligned Movement =

Group of countries not in major power blocs

- Logo of the Non-Aligned Movement during the 2024–2027 Uganda chairmanship

- Member States Observer States
- Coordinating bureau: United Nations Headquarters; New York City, New York
- Membership: 120 member states; 18 observer states; 10 international organisations

Leaders
  - Principal decision- making organ: Conference of Heads of State or Government of Non-Aligned Countries
  - Chairmanship: Uganda
  - Chair: Yoweri Museveni, President of Uganda
- Establishment: Belgrade, Yugoslavia; 1 September 1961; 65 years ago as the Conference of Heads of State or Government of Non-Aligned Countries
- Website https://nam.go.ug/

The Non-Aligned Movement (NAM) is a forum of 120 countries that are not formally aligned with or against any major power bloc. It was founded with the view to advancing interests of developing countries in the context of Cold War confrontation. After the United Nations, it is the largest grouping of states worldwide.

After the Korean War, some countries sought to counterbalance the rapid bipolarization of the world during the Cold War, when two major powers formed blocs and worked to pull the rest of the world into their orbits. One was the pro-Soviet socialist bloc whose best-known alliance was the Warsaw Pact, and the other the pro-American capitalist group of countries, many of which belonged to NATO. In 1961, drawing on the principles agreed at the Bandung Conference of 1955, the Non-Aligned Movement was established in Belgrade, Yugoslavia, through an initiative led by Yugoslav president Josip Broz Tito, Egyptian president Gamal Abdel Nasser, Indian prime minister Jawaharlal Nehru, Ghanaian president Kwame Nkrumah, and Indonesian president Sukarno. This led to the first Conference of Heads of State or Governments of Non-Aligned Countries in 1961.

The organization's purpose was described in 1979 by Fidel Castro, who said in his in Havana Declaration that it aimed to ensure "the national independence, sovereignty, territorial integrity and security of non-aligned countries" in their "struggle against imperialism, colonialism, neo-colonialism, racism, and all forms of foreign aggression, occupation, domination, interference or hegemony as well as against great power and bloc politics."

The countries of the Non-Aligned Movement represent nearly two-thirds of the United Nations' members and contain 55% of the world population. Membership is particularly concentrated in countries considered to be developing countries, although the Non-Aligned Movement also has a number of developed nations.

The Non-Aligned Movement gained the most traction in the 1950s and early 1960s, when the international policy of non-alignment achieved major successes in decolonization, disarmament, opposition to racism and opposition to apartheid in South Africa, and persisted throughout the entire Cold War, despite several conflicts between members, and despite some members developing closer ties with either the Soviet Union, China, or the United States. Since the Cold War's end in 1991, the movement has focused on developing multilateral ties and connections as well as unity among the developing nations of the world, especially those in the Global South.

== History ==
=== Origins and the Cold War ===
The aligned countries on the northern hemisphere: NATO in blue and the Warsaw Pact in red.

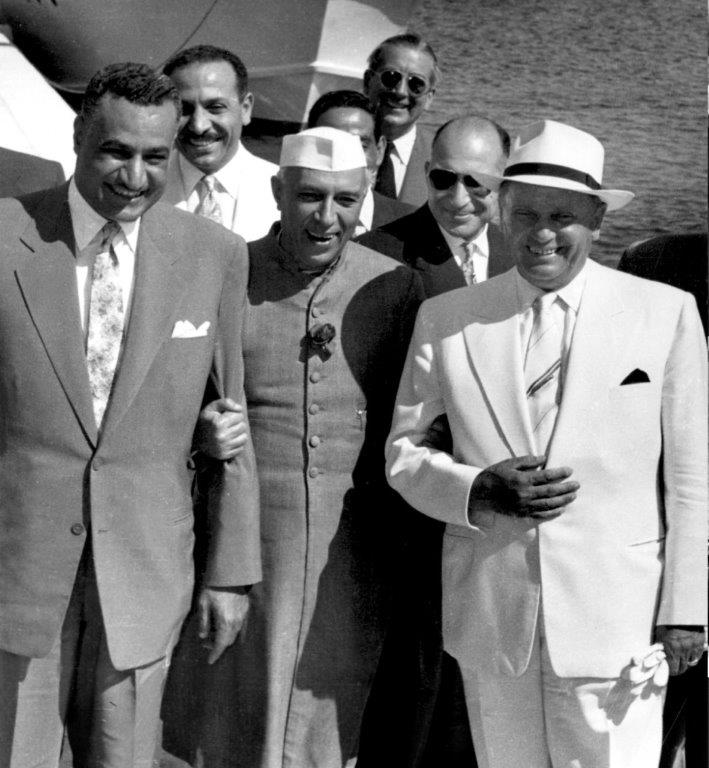
Josip Broz Tito, Jawaharlal Nehru, and Gamal Abdel Nasser, pioneers of the Non-Aligned Movement during the Brioni Meeting

The term "Non-Alignment" was used for the first time in 1950 at the United Nations by India and Yugoslavia, both of which refused to align themselves with any side in the multi-alliances involving Korean War. Drawing on the principles agreed at the Bandung Conference in 1955, the Non-Aligned Movement as an organization was founded on the Brijuni islands in Yugoslavia in 1956 and was formalized by signing the Declaration of Brijuni on 19 July 1956. The Declaration was signed by Yugoslavia's president, Josip Broz Tito, India's prime minister Jawaharlal Nehru and Egypt's president, Gamal Abdel Nasser. One of the quotations within the Declaration is "Peace can not be achieved with separation, but with the aspiration towards collective security in global terms and expansion of freedom, as well as terminating the domination of one country over another". According to Rejaul Karim Laskar, an ideologue of the Congress party which ruled India for most part of the Cold War years, the Non-Aligned Movement arose from the desire of Jawaharlal Nehru and other leaders of the newly independent countries of the third world to guard their independence and sovereignty "in face of complex international situation demanding allegiance to either two warring superpowers".

The movement advocates a middle course for states in the developing world between the Western and Eastern Blocs during the Cold War. The phrase itself was first used to represent the doctrine by Indian diplomat V. K. Krishna Menon in 1953, at the United Nations.

But it soon after became the name to refer to the participants of the Conference of Heads of State or Government of Non-Aligned Countries first held in 1961. The term "non-alignment" was established in 1953 at the United Nations. Nehru used the phrase in a 1954 speech in Colombo, Sri Lanka. In this speech, Zhou Enlai and Nehru described the Five Principles of Peaceful Coexistence to be used as a guide for Sino-Indian relations called Panchsheel (five restraints); these principles would later serve as the basis of the Non-Aligned Movement. The five principles were:

- Mutual respect for each other's territorial integrity and sovereignty.
- Mutual non-aggression.
- Mutual non-interference in domestic affairs.
- Equality and mutual benefit.
- Peaceful co-existence.

A significant milestone in the development of the Non-Aligned Movement was the 1955 Bandung Conference, a conference of Asian and African states hosted by Indonesian president Sukarno, who gave a significant boost to promote this movement. Bringing together Sukarno, U Nu, Nasser, Nehru, Tito, Nkrumah and Menon with the likes of Ho Chi Minh, Zhou Enlai, and Norodom Sihanouk, as well as U Thant and a young Indira Gandhi, the conference adopted a "declaration on promotion of world peace and cooperation", which included Zhou Enlai and Nehru's five principles, and a collective pledge to remain neutral in the Cold War. Six years after Bandung, an initiative of Yugoslav president Josip Broz Tito led to the first Conference of Heads of State or Government of Non-Aligned Countries, which was held in September 1961 in Belgrade. The term non-aligned movement appears first in the fifth conference in 1976, where participating countries are denoted as members of the movement.

At the Lusaka Conference in September 1970, the member nations added as aims of the movement the peaceful resolution of disputes and the abstention from the big power military alliances and pacts. Another added aim was opposition to stationing of military bases in foreign countries.

In 1975, the member nations which also were part of the United Nations General Assembly pushed for the Resolution 3379 along with Arab countries and the support of the Soviet bloc. It was a declarative non-binding measure that equated Zionism with South Africa's Apartheid and as a form of racial discrimination. The bloc voting produced a majority in the United Nations that systematically condemned Israel in the following resolutions: 3089, 3210, 3236, 32/40, etc.

Some Non-Aligned member nations were involved in serious conflicts with other members, notably India and Pakistan as well as Iran and Iraq.

==== Cuba's role ====
In the 1970s, Cuba made a major effort to assume a leadership role in the world's non-alignment movement. The country established military advisory missions and economic and social reform programs. The 1976 world conference of the Non-Aligned Movement applauded Cuban internationalism, "which assisted the people of Angola in frustrating the expansionist and colonialist strategy of South Africa's racist regime and its allies." The next Non-Aligned conference was scheduled for Havana in 1979, to be chaired by Fidel Castro, with his becoming the de facto spokesman for the movement. The conference in September 1979 marked the zenith of Cuban prestige. Most, but not all, attendees believed that Cuba was not aligned with the Soviet camp in the Cold War.

However, in December 1979, the Soviet Union intervened in Afghanistan's civil war. Up until that time, Afghanistan was also an active member of the Non-Aligned Movement. At the United Nations, nonaligned members voted 56 to 9, with 26 abstaining, to condemn the Soviet Union. Cuba voted against the resolution, in support of the USSR. It lost its nonaligned leadership and reputation after Castro, instead of becoming a high-profile spokesman for the movement, remained quiet and inactive. More broadly the movement was deeply split over the Soviet–Afghan War in 1979, as many members of the Non-Aligned Movement, particularly the predominantly Muslim states, condemned it.

=== Post-Cold War ===
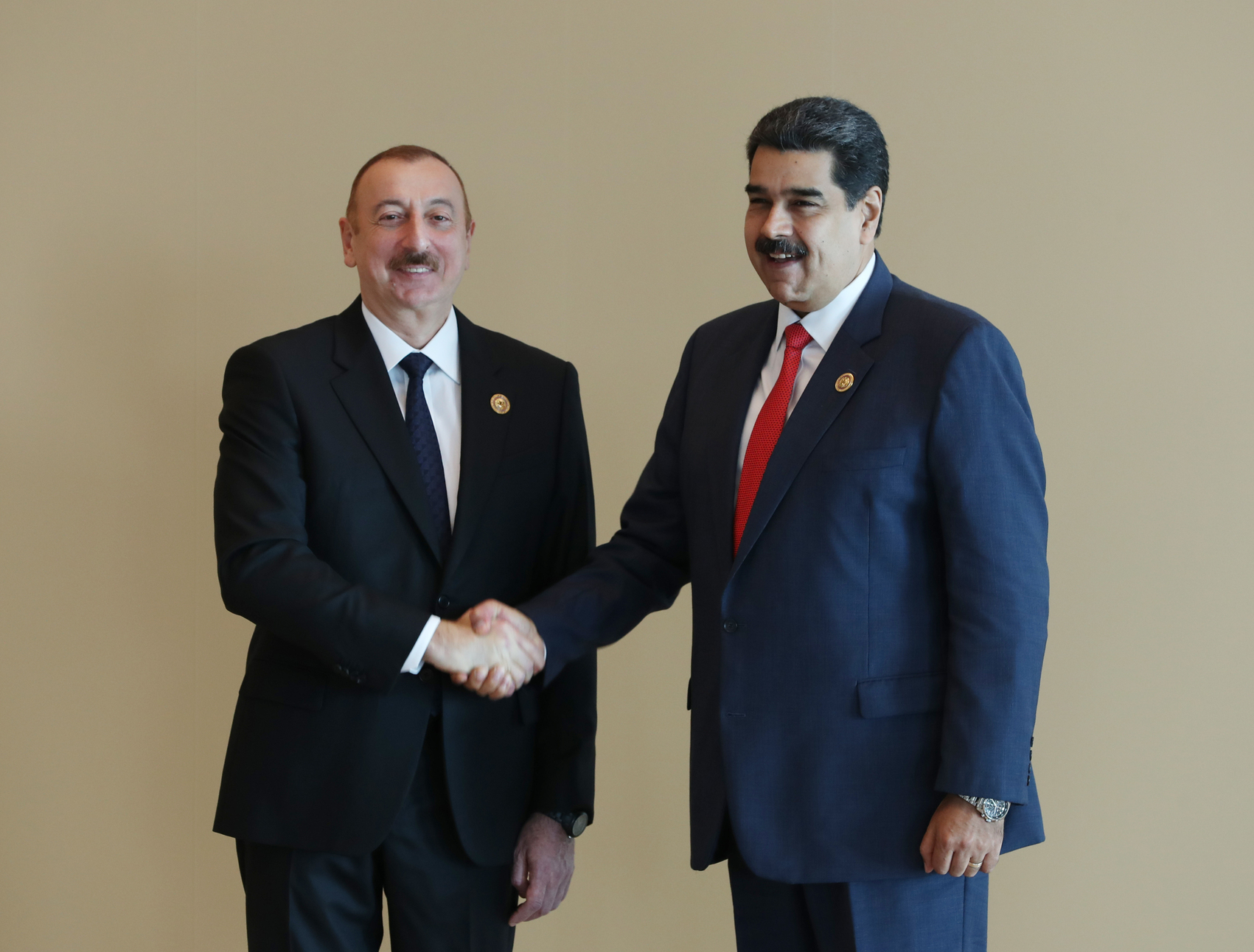
Azerbaijan's President Ilham Aliyev and Venezuela's President Nicolas Maduro at the 18th Summit of the Non-Aligned Movement in Baku on 25 October 2019

With the end of the Cold War, the Non-Aligned Movement transformed. The breakup of Yugoslavia (a prominent founding member) in 1991–1992 also affected the movement; the regular Ministerial Meeting of the movement, held in New York during the regular yearly session of the General Assembly of the United Nations in 1992 suspended Yugoslavia's membership. The various successor states of Yugoslavia have expressed little interest in membership, though Bosnia and Herzegovina, Croatia, Montenegro and Serbia retain observer status. India, another founding member, appears to have downgraded its emphasis on the movement.

Membership applications from Bosnia and Herzegovina and from Costa Rica were rejected in 1995 and 1998 respectively. In 2004 Malta and Cyprus ceased to be members when they joined the European Union, as required. Azerbaijan and Fiji are the most recent entrants, both having joined the movement in 2011. Azerbaijan and Belarus, which joined in 1998, remain the only members on the continent of Europe.

Since the end of the Cold War, the Non-Aligned Movement has felt forced to redefine itself and to reinvent its purpose in the new world-system. A major question has been whether any of its foundational ideologies, principally national independence, territorial integrity, and the struggle against colonialism and imperialism, apply to contemporary issues. The movement has emphasized its principles of multilateralism, equality, and mutual non-aggression in attempting to become a stronger voice for the Global South, and an instrument that can promote the needs of member-nations at the international level and strengthen their political leverage when negotiating with developed nations. In its efforts to advance Southern interests, the movement has stressed the importance of cooperation and unity amongst member states. However, as in the past, cohesion remains a problem, since the size of the organization and the divergence of agendas and allegiances present the ongoing potential for fragmentation. While agreement on basic principles has been smooth, taking definitive action vis-à-vis particular international issues has been rare, with the movement preferring to assert its criticism or support rather than to pass hard-line resolutions.

The movement continues to see a role for itself: in its view, the world's poorest nations remain exploited and marginalized, no longer by opposing superpowers, but rather in a uni-polar world, and it is Western hegemony and neo-colonialism that the movement has really re-aligned itself against. It opposes foreign occupation, interference in internal affairs and aggressive unilateral measures, but it has also shifted to focus on the socio-economic challenges facing member states, especially the inequalities manifested by globalization and the implications of neo-liberal policies. The Non-Aligned Movement has identified economic underdevelopment, poverty, and social injustices as growing threats to peace and security.

The 16th NAM summit took place in Tehran, Iran, from 26 to 31 August 2012. According to the Teheran-based Mehr News Agency, representatives from over 150 countries were scheduled to attend. Attendance at the highest level included 27 presidents, two kings and emirs, seven prime ministers, nine vice-presidents, two parliamentary spokesmen and five special envoys. At the summit, Iran took over from Egypt as Chair of the Non-Aligned Movement for the period 2012 to 2015.

In 2016 Venezuela hosted the 17th NAM Summit.

Azerbaijan, host of the 18th NAM summit in 2019, holds the Non-Aligned Movement presidency pending the 19th NAM summit, which took place in Kampala, Uganda in January 2024.

The 20th NAM summit is expected to be hosted by Uzbekistan.

== Organizational structure and membership ==
The movement stems from a desire not to be aligned within a geopolitical/military structure and therefore itself does not have a very strict organizational structure. Some organizational basics were defined at the 1996 Cartagena Document on Methodology The Summit Conference of Heads of State or Government of Non-Aligned States is "the highest decision making authority". The chairmanship rotates between countries and changes at every summit of heads of state or government to the country organizing the summit.

Requirements for membership of the Non-Aligned Movement coincide with the key beliefs of the United Nations. The current requirements are that the candidate country has displayed practices in accordance with the ten "Bandung principles" of 1955:

- Respect for fundamental human rights and for the purposes and principles of the Charter of the United Nations.
- Respect for the sovereignty and territorial integrity of all nations.
- Recognition of the movements for national independence.
- Recognition of the equality of all races and of the equality of all nations, large and small.
- Abstention from intervention or interference in the internal affairs of another country.
- Respect for the right of each nation to defend itself singly or collectively, in conformity with the Charter of the United Nations.
- Refraining from acts or threats of aggression or the use of force against the territorial integrity or political independence of any country.
- Settlement of all international disputes by peaceful means, in conformity with the Charter of the United Nations.
- Promotion of mutual interests and co-operation.
- Respect for justice and international obligations.

== Policies and ideology ==
Chairpersons of the NAM have included such diverse figures as Suharto, a militaristic anti-communist; Nelson Mandela, a democratic socialist and famous anti-apartheid activist; Mohamed Morsi, a conservative Islamist; Josip Broz Tito, a Marxist–Leninist, Yugoslav leader; and Ernesto Samper, a Colombian social liberal. Consisting of many governments with vastly different ideologies, the Non-Aligned Movement is unified by its declared commitment to world peace and security. At the seventh summit held in New Delhi in March 1983, the movement described itself as "history's biggest peace movement". The movement places equal emphasis on disarmament. NAM's commitment to peace pre-dates its formal institutionalization in 1961. The Brioni meeting between heads of governments of India, Egypt and Yugoslavia in 1956 recognized that there exists a vital link between struggle for peace and endeavours for disarmament.

During the 1970s and early 1980s, the NAM also sponsored campaigns for restructuring commercial relations between developed and developing nations, namely the New International Economic Order (NIEO), and its cultural offspring, the New World Information and Communication Order (NWICO). The latter, on its own, sparked a Non-Aligned initiative on cooperation for communications, the Non-Aligned News Agencies Pool, created in 1975 and later converted into the NAM News Network in 2005.

The Non-Aligned Movement espouses policies and practices of cooperation, especially those that are multilateral and provide mutual benefit to all those involved. Almost all of the members of the Non-Aligned Movement are also members of the United Nations. Both organizations have a stated policy of peaceful cooperation, yet the successes the NAM has had with multilateral agreements tend to be ignored by the larger, western- and developed- nation-dominated UN. African concerns about apartheid were linked with Arab-Asian concerns about Palestine and multilateral cooperation in these areas has enjoyed moderate success. The Non-Aligned Movement has played a major role in various ideological conflicts throughout its existence, including extreme opposition to apartheid governments and support of guerrilla movements in various locations, including Rhodesia and South Africa.

== Current activities and positions ==
=== Reform of the UN Security Council ===
The movement has been outspoken in its criticism of current UN structures and power dynamics, and advocating for the reforming of the United Nations Security Council, stating that the organization has been used by powerful states in ways that violate the movement's principles. It has made a number of recommendations that it says would strengthen the representation and power of "non-aligned" states. The proposed UN reforms are also aimed at improving the transparency and democracy of UN decision-making. The UN Security Council is the element it considers the most distorted, undemocratic, and in need of reshaping.

=== Self-determination of Puerto Rico ===
Since 1961, the organization has supported the discussion of the case of Puerto Rico's self-determination before the United Nations. A resolution on the matter was to be proposed on the XV Summit by the Hostosian National Independence Movement but did not progress.

=== Self-determination of Western Sahara ===
Since 1973, the group has supported the discussion of the case of Western Sahara's self-determination before the United Nations. The movement reaffirmed in its meeting (Sharm El Sheikh 2009) the support to the Self-determination of the Sahrawi people by choosing between any valid option, welcomed the direct conversations between the parties, and remembered the responsibility of the United Nations on the Sahrawi issue.

=== Sustainable developments ===
The movement is publicly committed to the tenets of sustainable development and the attainment of the Millennium Development Goals, but it believes that the international community has not created conditions conducive to development and has infringed upon the right to sovereign development by each member state. Issues such as globalization, the debt burden, unfair trade practices, the decline in foreign aid, donor conditionality, and the lack of democracy in international financial decision-making are cited as factors inhibiting development.

=== Criticism of US foreign policy ===
In recent years the organization has criticized certain aspects of US foreign policy. The 2003 invasion of Iraq and the war on terrorism, its attempts to stifle Iran and North Korea's nuclear plans, and its other actions have been denounced by some members of the Non-Aligned Movement as attempts to run roughshod over the sovereignty of smaller nations; at the most recent summit, Kim Yong-nam, chairman of North Korea's parliamentary standing committee, stated, "The United States is attempting to deprive other countries of even their legitimate right to peaceful nuclear activities."

=== NAM Centres ===
==== Centre for South-South Technical Cooperation ====
The Non-Aligned Movement Centre for South-South Technical Cooperation (NAM CSSTC) as an intergovernmental institution, which enables developing countries to increase national capacity and their collective self-reliance, forms part of the efforts of NAM. The NAM CSSTC is located in Jakarta, Indonesia with a South-South Technical Cooperation focus. The NAM CSSTC was set up a few years after the Cold War to promote development in developing countries and to accelerate growth. From 18 to 20 October 1995, in Cartagena de Indias, 140 nations gathered and accepted a final document stating in paragraph 313 of the Final Document the establishment of the Centre for South-South Technical Cooperation in Indonesia.

The organization aims to achieve the development goal of developing countries to achieve sustainable human development and enable developing countries to be equal partners in international relations, in accordance with the Final Document.

The NAM CSSTC's main body is the board of directors. In addition, the Board of Directors has a consultative arrangement with a Governing Council under the leadership of the Vice Minister for Foreign Affairs of the Republic of Indonesia and its members include Ambassador of Brunei, Ambassador of Cuba and Ambassador of South Africa. The head of the administrative officer of NAM CSSTC is accredited by Ronny Prasetyo Yuliantoro, Director, current Indonesian diplomat and Ambassador of the Republic of Indonesia to the Islamic Republic of Iran, who began his term of office on 1 July 2018. The organization is financed by Indonesia's volunteer contributions. The NAM CSSTC, its officers, consists of a full-time staff who are not affiliated with any other governmental institution except their head of the administrative officer, who is typically nominated from Echelon-I or Echelon-II staff from the Indonesian ministries. Some say the organization is a major endeavour to build NAM member countries' capacities.

===== History =====
A few years before the NAM CSSTC was set up, the NAM summit in 1992 in Jakarta to discuss efforts to strengthen collective autonomy and to review of the international economic environment in order to step up South-South cooperation.

After the admission of Brunei Darussalam to the NAM during the summit, the Government of the Republic of Indonesia called for a South-South Technical Cooperation Centre (now known as the NAM CSSTC) to be established by the Government of the Republic of Indonesia and the Government of Brunei Darussalam with the aim of organizing different training, research and seminar programmes and activities. The programme activities, aimed at eradicating poverty, encouraging SMEs and the application of information communication technologies.

===== Programmes =====
The NAM CSSTC carries out its activities through cooperation with NAM member countries' training centres and specialists and other multilateral organizations. Examples include Workshop on IUU fishing eradication, dispatch of agricultural experts to Myanmar and international tissue culture training.

===== Evaluations =====
NAM CSSTC reports quarterly to the Ministry of Foreign Affairs of the Republic of Indonesia and the NAM Coordinating Bureau in New York. Annually, the Ministry and the Bureau will be given additional details on programmes and events, including their assessments.

Other NAM Centres focus on the health, human rights (Center for Human Rights and Cultural Diversity) and technology (Centre for Science and Technology of the Non-aligned and Other Developing Countries) sectors are each located in Cuba, Iran and India.

=== Youth Organization ===
The Non-Alligned Movement Youth Organization, abrreviated to NAMYO, is the Non-Alligned Movement's youth branch, which collaberates with the youth of NAM member states to "exchange ideas, visions, and perspectives on current challenges."Its first summit, at that time as the Non-Alligned Movement Youth Network, took place during the 18th Summit of the Non-Aligned Movement in Baku, Azerbaijan. It was officially inaugurated in a virtual meeting held on October 4-5 of 2021. In 2022, the second NAM Youth Summit resulted in the formal adoption of the Shusha Accords which transformed the NAM Youth Network into the NAM Youth Organization. It currently holds over 60 national chapters around the world.

=== Cultural diversity and human rights ===
The movement accepts the universality of human rights and social justice, but fiercely resists cultural homogenization. In line with its views on sovereignty, the organization appeals for the protection of cultural diversity, and the tolerance of the religious, socio-cultural, and historical particularities that define human rights in a specific region.

=== Working groups, task forces, committees ===
Currently, the NAM Working Groups (WG) are chaired by the following countries:

- Algeria – WG Reform of the UN and revitalization of the General Assembly
- Egypt – WG on the Reform of the UN Security Council
- Indonesia – WG on Disarmament
- Cuba – WG on Human Rights
- Morocco – WG on peacekeeping operations
- Iran – WG on Legal Matters
- Venezuela – WG on Unilateral Coercive Measures
- Bangladesh – Peacebuilding Caucus

Other Working groups, task forces, committees:

- Committee on Palestine
- High-Level Working Group for the Restructuring of the United Nations
- Joint Coordinating Committee (chaired by Chairman of G-77 and Chairman of NAM)
- Non-Aligned Security Caucus
- Standing Ministerial Committee for Economic Cooperation
- Task Force on Somalia

== Summits ==
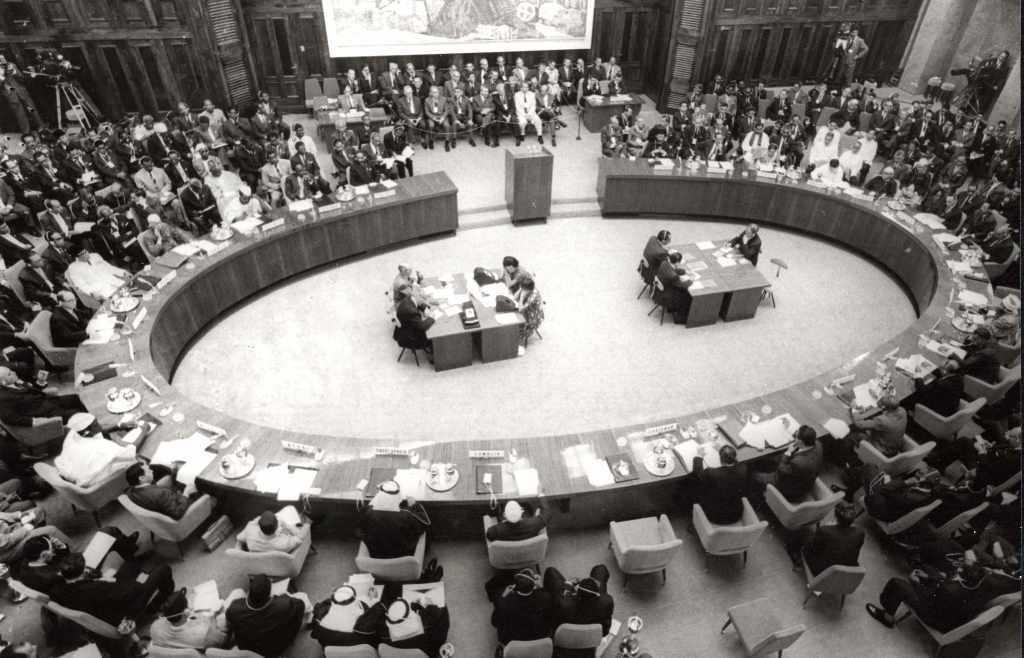
1st summit, Belgrade

The conference of Heads of State or Government of the Non-Aligned Countries, often referred to as Non-Aligned Movement Summit is the main meeting within the movement and are held every few years:

	Date	Host country	Host city	Slogan
1st	1–6 September 1961	Yugoslavia	Belgrade	
2nd	5–10 October 1964	United Arab Republic	Cairo	
3rd	8–10 September 1970	Zambia	Lusaka	
4th	5–9 September 1973	Algeria	Algiers	
5th	16–19 August 1976	Sri Lanka	Colombo	
6th	3–9 September 1979	Cuba	Havana	
7th	7–12 March 1983	India	New Delhi	
8th	1–6 September 1986	Zimbabwe	Harare	
9th	4–7 September 1989	Yugoslavia	Belgrade	
10th	1–6 September 1992	Indonesia	Jakarta	
11th	18–20 October 1995	Colombia	Cartagena	
12th	2–3 September 1998	South Africa	Durban	
13th	20–25 February 2003	Malaysia	Kuala Lumpur	
14th	15–16 September 2006	Cuba	Havana	
15th	11–16 July 2009	Egypt	Sharm el-Sheikh	International Solidarity for Peace and Development
16th	26–31 August 2012	Iran	Tehran	Lasting peace through joint global governance
17th	13–18 September 2016	Venezuela	Porlamar	Peace, Sovereignty and Solidarity for Development
18th	25–26 October 2019	Azerbaijan	Baku	Upholding the Bandung principles to ensure a concerted and adequate response to the challenges of the contemporary world
19th	15–20 January 2024	Uganda	Kampala	Deepening Cooperation for Shared Global Affluence
20th	2027	Uzbekistan		

A variety of ministerial meetings are held between the summit meetings. Some are specialists, such as the meeting on "Inter-Faith Dialogue and Co-operation for Peace", held in Manila, the Philippines, 16–18 March 2010. There is a general Conference of Foreign Ministers every three years. The most recent were in Bali, Indonesia, 23–27 May 2011 and Algiers, Algeria, 26–29 May 2014.

The 7th Summit was originally planned for September 1982 in Baghdad, the Iraqi capital, during the Iran–Iraq War. On 21 July of that year, the Iran Air Force executed the "Baghdad Operation", an effort to disrupt that proposal by showing Baghdad's airspace was unsafe. Two McDonnell Douglas F-4 Phantom II planes bombarded Al-Dura refinery with Mark 82 bomb. One plane returned damaged and the other (along with its pilot) was lost to Iraqi defensive fire. Combined with threats by an Iranian-backed terror group to kill the visiting heads of state, the effort was successful. On 11 August, Iraqi President Saddam Hussein announced that he would support Cuba's suggestion of a summit in New Delhi to be held in 1983. "Iraq will take part in the conference even if held in Tehran... We propose that the seventh conference be held in India."

The Non-Aligned Movement celebrated its 50th anniversary in Belgrade on 5–6 September 2011.

An online summit titled "United Against Covid-19" conducted on 4 May 2020, on the initiative of the chairman of the NAM for the 2019–2022 period, addressed mainly the global struggle to fight the COVID-19 pandemics and supporting NAM to increase its role in dealing with and mitigating the outcomes caused by this disease in NAM, as well as other countries.

The Non-Aligned Movement celebrated its 60th anniversary in Belgrade, on 11–12 October 2021.

== Chair ==
Image	Chair	Country (Presidency)	Party	From	To
	Josip Broz Tito (1892–1980)	Yugoslavia	League of Communists of Yugoslavia	1961	1964
	Gamal Abdel Nasser (1918–1970)	United Arab Republic	Arab Socialist Union	1964	1970
	Kenneth Kaunda (1924–2021)	Zambia	United National Independence Party	1970	1973
	Houari Boumediène (1932–1978)	Algeria	Revolutionary Council	1973	1976
	Sirimavo Bandaranaike (1916–2000)	Sri Lanka	Sri Lanka Freedom Party	1976	1977
	Junius Richard Jayewardene (1906–1996)	Sri Lanka	United National Party	1977	1979
	Fidel Castro (1926–2016)	Cuba	Communist Party of Cuba	1979	1983
	Indira Gandhi (1917-1984)	India	Indian National Congress	1983	1984
	Rajiv Gandhi (1944-1991)	India	Indian National Congress	1984	1986
	Robert Mugabe (1924–2019)	Zimbabwe	ZANU-PF	1986	1989
	Janez Drnovšek (1950–2008)	Yugoslavia	League of Communists of Yugoslavia	1989	1990
	Borisav Jović (1928–2021)	Yugoslavia	Socialist Party of Serbia	1990	1991
	Stjepan Mesić (born 1934)	Yugoslavia	Croatian Democratic Union	1991	
	Branko Kostić (1939–2020)	Yugoslavia	Democratic Party of Socialists of Montenegro	1991	1992
	Dobrica Ćosić (1921–2014)	FR Yugoslavia	Independent	1992	
	Suharto (1921–2008)	Indonesia	Golkar	1992	1995
	Ernesto Samper (born 1950)	Colombia	Colombian Liberal Party	1995	1998
	Andrés Pastrana Arango (born 1954)	Colombia	Colombian Conservative Party	1998	
	Nelson Mandela (1918–2013)	South Africa	African National Congress	1998	1999
	Thabo Mbeki (born 1942)	South Africa	African National Congress	1999	2003
	Mahathir Mohamad (born 1925)	Malaysia	United Malays National Organisation	2003	
	Abdullah Ahmad Badawi (1939–2025)	Malaysia	United Malays National Organisation	2003	2006
	Fidel Castro (1926–2016)	Cuba	Communist Party of Cuba	2006	2008
	Raúl Castro (born 1931)	Cuba	Communist Party of Cuba	2008	2009
	Hosni Mubarak (1928–2020)	Egypt	National Democratic Party	2009	2011
	Mohamed Hussein Tantawi (1935–2021)	Egypt	Independent	2011	2012
	Mohamed Morsi (1951–2019)	Egypt	Freedom and Justice Party	2012	
	Mahmoud Ahmadinejad (born 1956)	Iran	Alliance of Builders of Islamic Iran	2012	2013
	Hassan Rouhani (born 1948)	Iran	Moderation and Development Party	2013	2016
	Nicolás Maduro (born 1962)	Venezuela	United Socialist Party	2016	2019
	Ilham Aliyev (born 1961)	Azerbaijan	New Azerbaijan Party	2019	2024
	Yoweri Museveni (born 1944)	Uganda	National Resistance Movement	2024	2027
	Shavkat Mirziyoyev (born 1957)	Uzbekistan	Uzbekistan Liberal Democratic Party	2027	2029

== Coordinating Bureau ==
The Coordinating Bureau, also based at the UN, is the main instrument for directing the work of the movement's task forces, committees and working groups. Day-to-day work of NAM is being carried out by Working Groups, on behalf of the Coordinating Bureau.

== Members, observers and guests ==
Non-Aligned Movement member countries by year joined

=== Current members ===
The following countries are members of the NAM, arranged by continent, showing their year of admission:

==== Africa ====
Currently, every African country is a member of the Non-Aligned Movement.

1. Algeria (1961)
2. Angola (1976)
3. Benin (1964)
4. Botswana (1970)
5. Burkina Faso (1973)
6. Burundi (1964)
7. Cameroon (1964)
8. Cape Verde (1976)
9. Central African Republic (1964)
10. Chad (1964)
11. Comoros (1976)
12. Democratic Republic of the Congo (1961)
13. Djibouti (1983)
14. Egypt (1961)
15. Equatorial Guinea (1970)
16. Eritrea (1995)
17. Eswatini (1970)
18. Ethiopia (1961)
19. Gabon (1970)
20. Gambia (1973)
21. Ghana (1961)
22. Guinea (1961)
23. Guinea-Bissau (1976)
24. Ivory Coast (1973)
25. Kenya (1964)
26. Lesotho (1970)
27. Liberia (1964)
28. Libya (1964)
29. Madagascar (1973)
30. Malawi (1964)
31. Mali (1961)
32. Mauritania (1964)
33. Mauritius (1973)
34. Morocco (1961)
35. Mozambique (1976)
36. Namibia (1979)
37. Niger (1973)
38. Nigeria (1964)
39. Republic of the Congo (1964)
40. Rwanda (1970)
41. São Tomé and Príncipe (1976)
42. Senegal (1964)
43. Seychelles (1976)
44. Sierra Leone (1964)
45. Somalia (1961)
46. South Africa (1994)
47. South Sudan (2024)
48. Sudan (1961)
49. Tanzania (1964)
50. Togo (1964)
51. Tunisia (1961)
52. Uganda (1964)
53. Zambia (1964)
54. Zimbabwe (1979)

==== Asia ====
1. /Afghanistan (1961)
2. Bahrain (1973)
3. Bangladesh (1973)
4. Bhutan (1973)
5. Brunei Darussalam (1993)
6. Cambodia (1961)
7. India (1961)
8. Indonesia (1961)
9. Iran (1979)
10. Iraq (1961)
11. Jordan (1964)
12. Kuwait (1964)
13. Laos (1964)
14. Lebanon (1961)
15. Malaysia (1970)
16. Maldives (1976)
17. Mongolia (1993)
18. Myanmar (1961)
19. Nepal (1961)
20. North Korea (1975)
21. Oman (1973)
22. Pakistan (1979)
23. Palestine (1976)
24. Philippines (1993)
25. Qatar (1973)
26. Saudi Arabia (1961)
27. Singapore (1970)
28. Sri Lanka (1961)
29. Syria (1964)
30. Thailand (1993)
31. East Timor (2003)
32. Turkmenistan (1995)
33. United Arab Emirates (1970)
34. Uzbekistan (1993)
35. Vietnam (1976)
36. Yemen (1990)

==== Eastern Europe ====
1. Azerbaijan (2011)
2. Belarus (1998)

==== Latin America ====
1. Antigua and Barbuda (2006)
2. Bahamas (1983)
3. Barbados (1983)
4. Belize (1981)
5. Bolivia (1979)
6. Colombia (1983)
7. Cuba (1961)
8. Dominica (2006)
9. Dominican Republic (2000)
10. Ecuador (1983)
11. Grenada (1979)
12. Guatemala (1993)
13. Guyana (1970)
14. Haiti (2006)
15. Honduras (1995)
16. Jamaica (1970)
17. Nicaragua (1979)
18. Panama (1976)
19. Peru (1973)
20. Saint Kitts and Nevis (2006)
21. Saint Lucia (1983)
22. Saint Vincent and the Grenadines (2003)
23. Suriname (1983)
24. Trinidad and Tobago (1970)
25. Venezuela (1989

==== Pacific Islands ====
1. Fiji (2011)
2. Papua New Guinea (1993)
3. Vanuatu (1983)

=== Former members ===
1. North Yemen (1961–1990)
2. Cyprus (1961–2004)
3. Yugoslavia (1961–1992)
4. South Yemen (1970–1990)
5. Chile (1971–2026)
6. Malta (1973–2004)
7. Argentina (1973–1991)
8. South West Africa People's Organisation (until 1990)

=== Observers ===
The following countries and organizations have observer status:

==== Countries ====
1. Argentina
2. Armenia
3. Bosnia and Herzegovina
4. Brazil
5. China
6. Costa Rica
7. Croatia
8. El Salvador
9. Kazakhstan
10. Kyrgyzstan
11. Mexico
12. Montenegro
13. Paraguay
14. Russia
15. Serbia
16. Tajikistan
17. Ukraine
18. Uruguay

==== Organizations ====
1. Association of Southeast Asian Nations
2. African Union
3. Afro-Asian People's Solidarity Organisation
4. Arab League
5. Commonwealth Secretariat
6. Hostosian National Independence Movement
7. Kanak and Socialist National Liberation Front
8. Organisation of Islamic Cooperation
9. South Centre
10. United Nations
11. World Peace Council

=== Former observers ===
1. Vatican City (1970)

=== Guests ===
There is no permanent guest status, but often several non-member countries are represented as guests at conferences. In addition, a large number of organizations, both from within the UN system and from outside, are always invited as guests.

== See also ==
- Asian–African Conference
- "Axis of evil"
- BRICS
- Five Principles of Peaceful Coexistence
- "Free World"
- G-77
- India and the Non-Aligned Movement
- "Near abroad"
- Neutral country
  - Neutral and Non-Aligned European States
  - Neutral powers during World War II
- New International Economic Order
- New World Information and Communication Order
- "New world order"
- North–South divide
- "Outposts of tyranny"
- South-South Cooperation
- Third World
- Third-Worldism
- United Nations Conference on Trade and Development
- Yugoslavia and the Non-Aligned Movement
