= 1st Summit of the Non-Aligned Movement =

1961 Belgrade summit conference

Summit Conference of Heads of State or Government of the Non-Aligned Movement
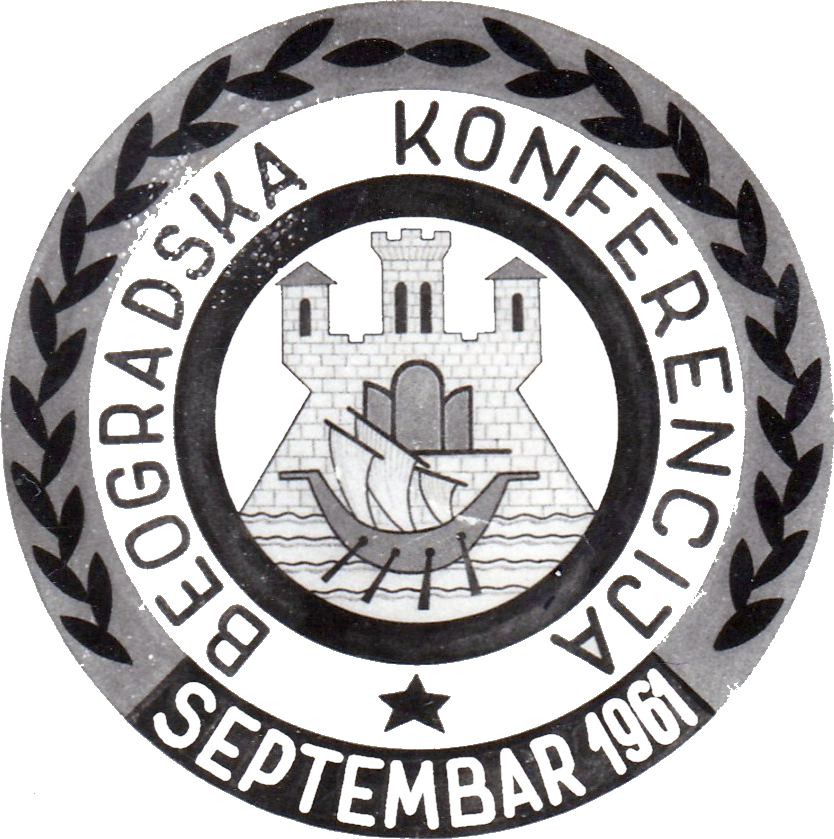

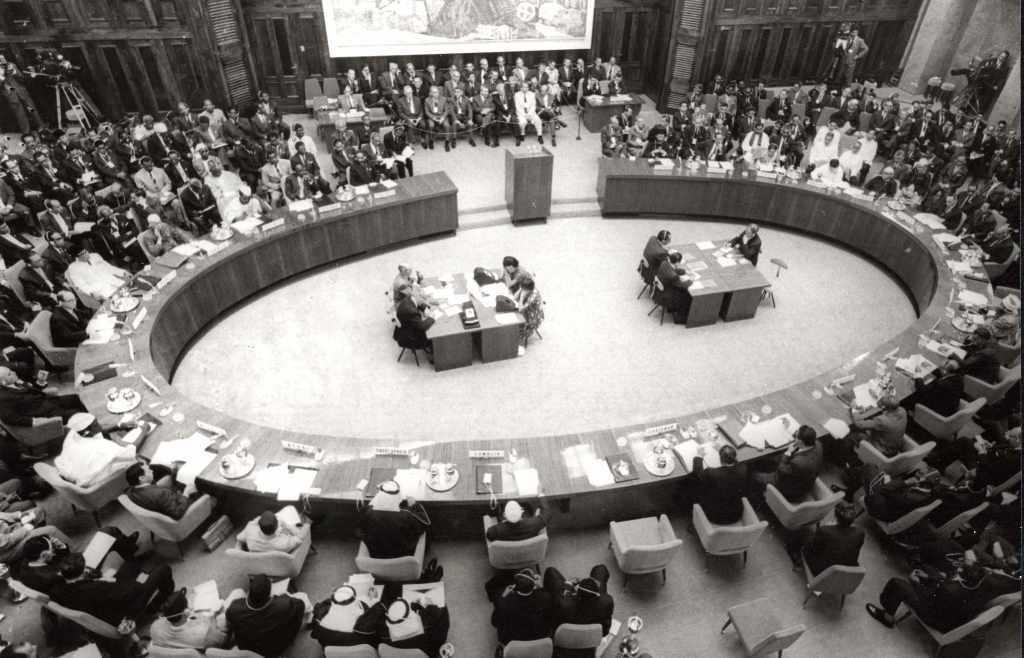
- Meeting at the House of the National Assembly
- Host country: Yugoslavia
- Date: 1–6 September 1961
- Cities: Belgrade
- Venues: House of the National Assembly
- Participants: Afghanistan Algeria; Burma; Cambodia; Ceylon; Congo-Léopoldville; Cuba; Cyprus; Ethiopia; Ghana; Guinea; India; Indonesia; Iraq; Lebanon; Mali; Morocco; Nepal; Saudi Arabia; Somalia; Sudan; Tunisia; United Arab Republic; Yemen Yugoslavia
- Chair: Josip Broz Tito (President of Yugoslavia)
- Follows: Bandung Conference
- Precedes: 2nd Summit (Cairo, United Arab Republic)

Summit Conference of Heads of State or Government of the Non-Aligned Movement (Serbo-Croatian: Конференција шефова држава или влада несврстаних земаља / Konferencija šefova država ili vlada nesvrstanih zemalja, Macedonian: Конференција на шефови на држави или влади на неврзани земји, Slovene: Konferenca voditeljev držav ali vlad neuvrščenih držav) on 1–6 September 1961 in Belgrade, Yugoslavia was the first conference of the Non-Aligned Movement. A major contributing factor to the organization of the conference was the process of decolonization in a number of African countries in the 1960s. Some therefore called it the "Third World's Yalta" in reference to 1945 Yalta Conference.

Twenty-five countries in total participated in Belgrade Conference, whilst 3 countries – Bolivia, Brazil and Ecuador – were observers. The preparatory meeting of Non-Aligned Countries took place earlier, in 1961, in Cairo. One of the issues which divided the newly independent countries was the Congo Crisis, which led to the creation of the conservative and anti-radical Brazzaville Group and the radical nationalist Casablanca Group. All members of the Casablanca Group attended the conference, including Algeria, Ghana, Guinea, Mali, Morocco and the United Arab Republic, whereas none of the Brazzaville Group was present. The summit was followed by the 2nd Summit of the Non-Aligned Movement in Cairo in 1964. The 1962 Cairo Conference on the Problems of Developing Countries was a direct follow-up of the Belgrade summit, at which Brazil, Ethiopia, India, Senegal and Yugoslavia prepared for the upcoming UNCTAD conference of the ECOSOC.

== Conference ==
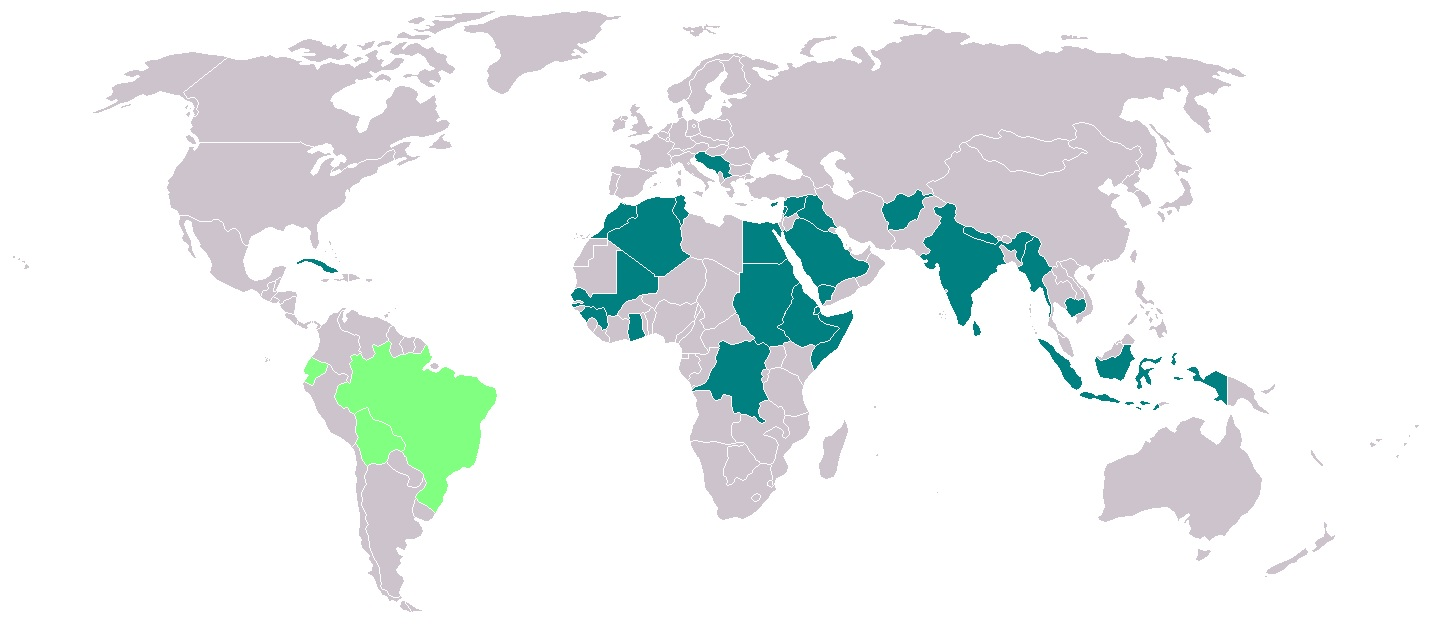
Participating states.

The Brijuni Islands, an archipelago in the Socialist Republic of Croatia, were initially considered to host the summit, after they hosted the Brioni Meeting of 1956. Belgrade was ultimately selected due to Brijuni's insufficient venues and concentration of the international communication and media facilities in the capital city of Yugoslavia.

Vladimir Popović was the head of the Yugoslav State Committee for the Preparation of the Conference. The conference brought together 25 independent states. In addition, there were three states that had observer status, eleven socialist parties, trade unions from Japan and four other organizations. Socio-economic differences between participants were great and, from the beginning, participating states often showed different interests. Yugoslavia attached special importance to Latin American participation. The participation of these countries, along with the representatives of Europe, should have given the conference the character of a gathering where all parts of the world are represented, and avoid reduction to an Afro-Asian meeting as was case with some meetings before.

President Tito only partially succeeded in bringing together all parts of the world to the conference. From Latin America, only Cuba was a full participant, while Bolivia, Brazil and Ecuador had observer status. The reason for that was the inability of these states to resist some pressure from the United States which wanted to preserve its role in the Western Hemisphere. The representatives of Yugoslavia were especially disappointed with Mexico's last minute cancelation. Of the European countries, only Cyprus and Yugoslavia as a host participated in the meeting.

The conference was followed by 1,016 journalists of which 690 were from abroad from 53 countries. The New York Times' Paul Hofmann described the event as a "paradise for cameramen". Together, four Indian newspapers (The Times of India, The Hindu Madras, Indian Express and The Patriot) and four American newspapers (The New York Times, The Washington Post, Los Angeles Times and The Christian Science Monitor) published 177,265 words about the conference in 7 days before, during and 7 days after the conference.

== Belgrade's transformation for the conference ==
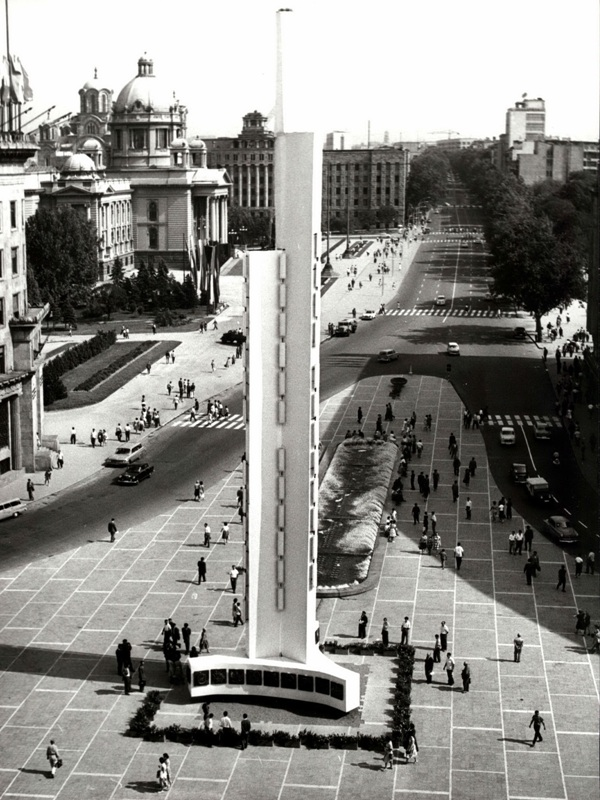
Belgrade during the conference

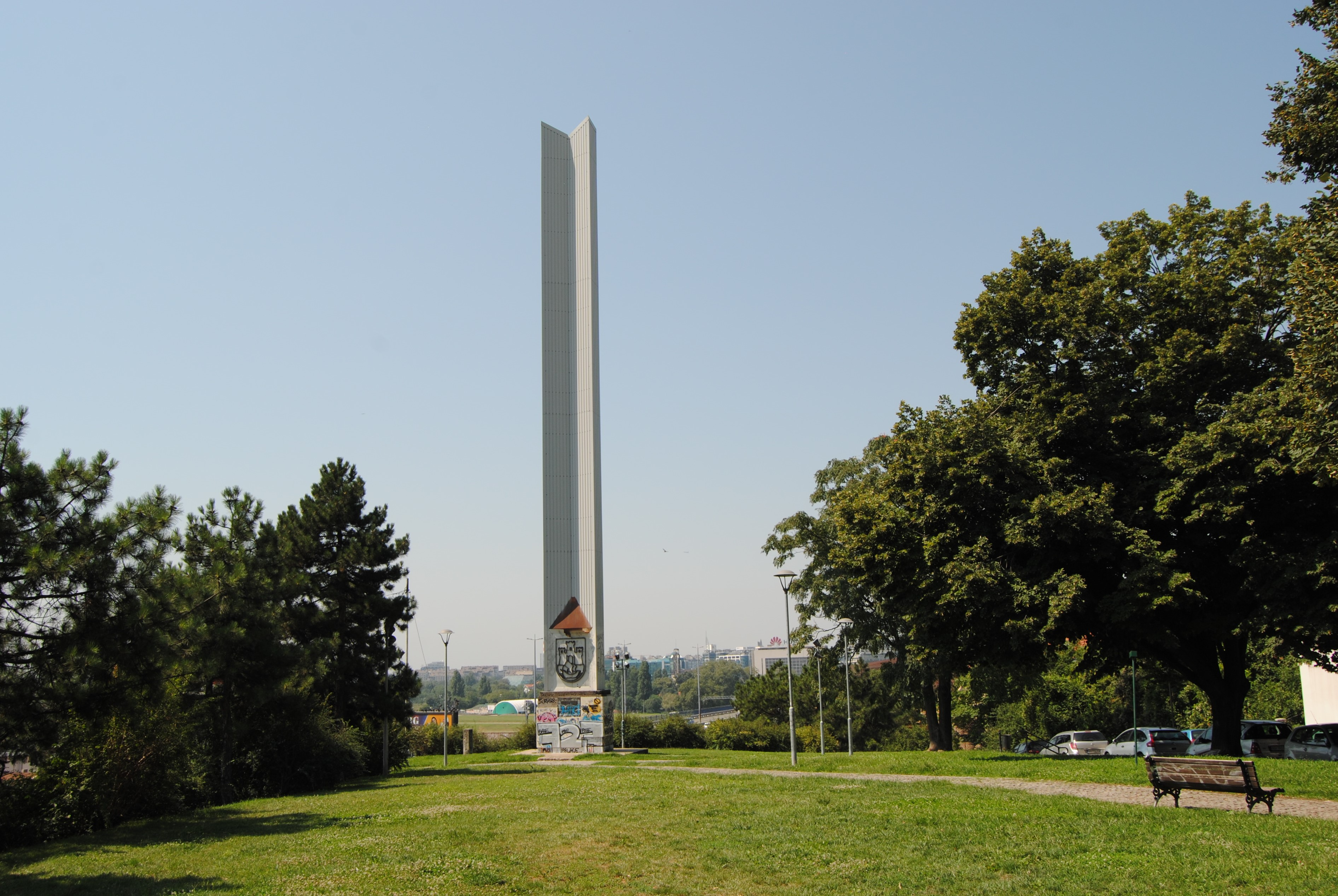
One of the obelisks erected for the conference in today's Park of Non-Aligned Countries

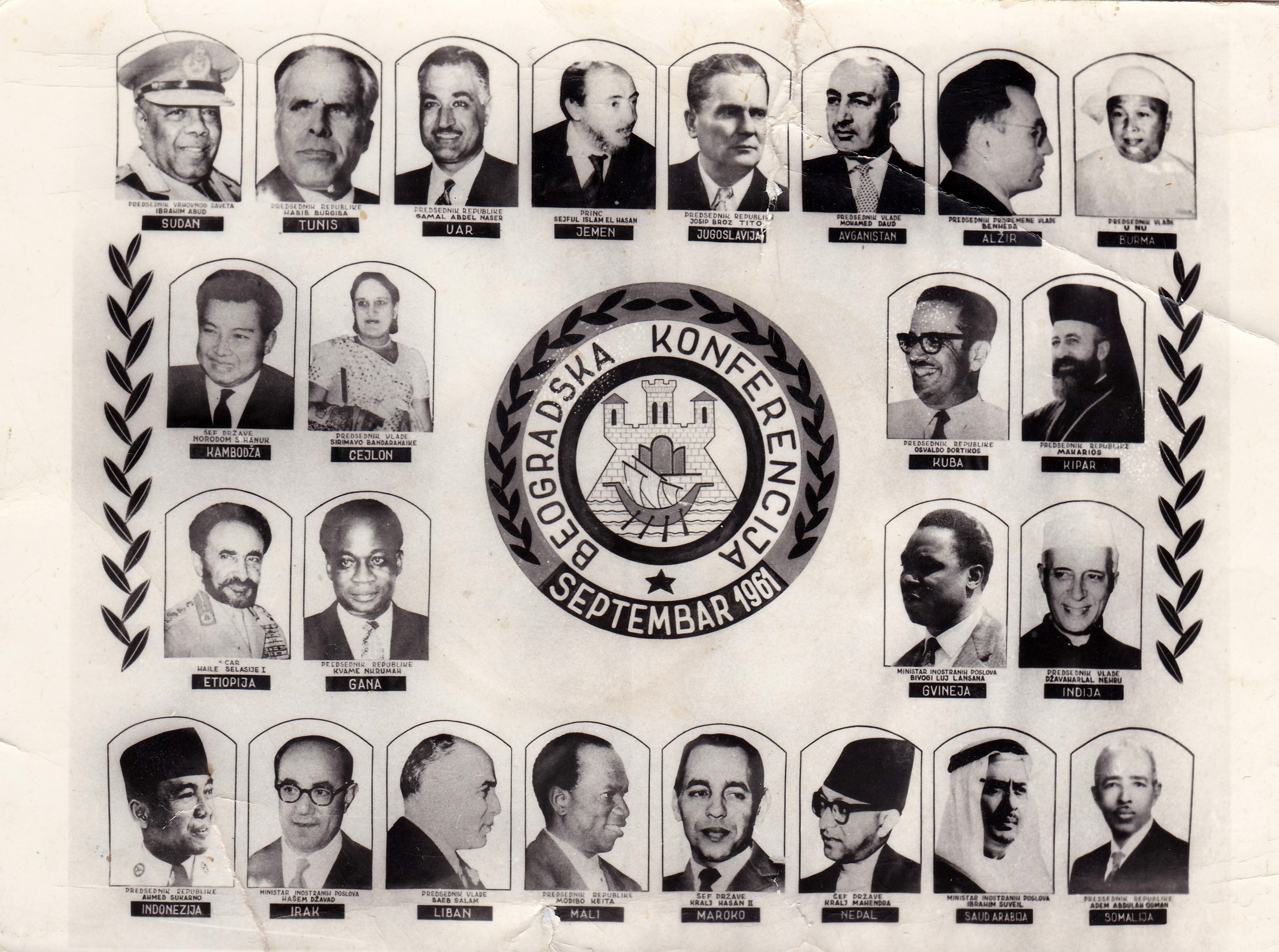
Group portrait of leaders

To accommodate the influx of politicians, delegation members, and journalists, extensive preparations were carried out in Belgrade. Within two months, around 350 hospitality venues were renovated, including all of the city's hotels at the time. Several slums near the parliament building were demolished, and their residents were relocated to new apartments in Banovo Brdo. Forty new streets were built, the first illuminated signs appeared on Terazije, and the water supply, sewage system, and street lighting were upgraded. The parliament building, which hosted the public sessions, was specially refurbished for the occasion. At the city's entrance, the unofficial motto of the conference was displayed in several languages: "All people of the world want peace" ("Svi ljudi sveta hoće mir").

Large crowds gathered opposite the Assembly building, in front of Pioneer Park, to watch the delegations arrive. Tito welcomed the guests; following the playing of national anthems and an inspection of the Guard of Honour, the leaders of Third World countries were driven to their residences through streets lined with cheering onlookers.

A 15‑metre‑high emblem of the conference stood at the entrance to the city. At the Topčider interchange, a triangular structure was erected to represent the core principles of the conference: peace, independence, and equal international cooperation. At the confluence of the Sava and Danube in New Belgrade, the Park of Friendship was inaugurated in honour of the event, where heads of state planted plane trees. In Pioneer Park, an Avenue of Nations was established, featuring information boards about the participating countries.

Two obelisks were constructed for the summit. One was erected on Marx and Engels Square (today's Trg Nikole Pašića). It was a prefabricated structure with a tubular metal framework, featuring neon lighting along its edges. Completed at the last minute due to heavy rain in the preceding days, the obelisk caught fire at one point, prompting an investigation. This obelisk was dismantled after the conference, whereas the second one was preserved and remains standing next to Branko's Bridge today.

A year prior to the conference, a new coat of arms of Belgrade was adopted. The introduction of this design has been closely linked to the preparations for the first conference of non‑aligned countries. Consequently, the new city emblem was prominently featured on the obelisk built next to Branko's Bridge.

On the first day of the conference, Tito hosted a formal luncheon at the building on Marx and Engels Square. Alongside his wife Jovanka, he later held a gala reception for approximately 2,000 guests at the Hotel Metropol. This was followed by an excursion to the Petrovaradin Fortress, which featured an impressive fireworks display. The conference concluded on 6 September, after which Tito invited his guests to relax on the Brijuni Islands following the strenuous six‑day working sessions.

During the summit, a special bulletin titled "The Belgrade Conference" (Beogradska konferencija) was published, and proceedings were simultaneously interpreted into four languages: English, French, Spanish, and Arabic. Over 850 domestic and foreign journalists were stationed at the Trade Union Hall, where they followed the sessions via television broadcasts across five halls. They had access to 30 telephone booths for domestic and international calls, as well as 33 teleprinters and radio transmission equipment. The journalists were accommodated in two dedicated buildings on Cvijićeva and Roosevelt Street, and a special taxi rank was set up for their use.

=== Participants ===
- Mohammed Daoud Khan, Prime Minister of Afghanistan
- (Algeria) Benyoucef Benkhedda, Head of the Provisional Government of the Algerian Republic
- (Myanmar) U Nu, Prime Minister of Burma
- Norodom Sihanouk, Chief of State of Cambodia
- (Dominion of Ceylon) Sirimavo Bandaranaike, Prime Minister of Ceylon
- (First Congolese Republic) Cyrille Adoula, Prime minister of Congo-Léopoldville, Antoine Gizenga, Deputy Prime Minister, and Justin Bomboko, Minister of Foreign Affairs (Delegation of Congo-Léopoldville arrived in Belgrade on 4 September and took part only in the last two days of the Summit)
- Osvaldo Dorticós Torrado, President of Cuba
- Makarios III, President of Cyprus
- Haile Selassie, Emperor of Ethiopia
- Kwame Nkrumah, President of Ghana
- Louis Lansana Beavogui, Foreign Minister of Guinea
- Jawaharlal Nehru, Prime Minister of India
- Sukarno, President of Indonesia
- Hashem Jawad, Foreign Minister of Iraq
- Saeb Salam, Prime Minister of Lebanon
- Modibo Keïta, President of Mali
- Hassan II, King of Morocco
- Mahendra, King of Nepal
- Ibrahim bin Abdullah Al Suwaiyel, Foreign Minister of Saudi Arabia
- Aden Adde, President of Somalia
- Ibrahim Abboud, President of Sudan
- Habib Bourguiba, President of Tunisia
- Gamal Abdel Nasser, President of the United Arab Republic
- Prince Seif el Islam el Hassan, Permanent representative of the Kingdom of Yemen in the United Nations
- (Socialist Federal Republic of Yugoslavia) Josip Broz Tito, President of Yugoslavia

==== Observers ====
- José Fellman, Minister of Education of Bolivia and Jorge Gutierrez Allendrebe, minister plenipotentiary
- (Brazil) Franco Filho de Mello, Brazilian Ambassador to Switzerland
- (Ecuador) Jose Joaquin Silva, Ecuadorian Ambassador to West Germany

==== Guests ====
- (Canada) Robert Ford
- (United States) George F. Kennan
- (United Kingdom) Michael Creswell

== See also ==
- Yugoslavia and the Non-Aligned Movement
- 50th Anniversary Additional Commemorative Non-Aligned Meeting
- 60th Anniversary Additional Commemorative Non-Aligned Meeting

== Sources ==
- Ацовић, Драгомир М. (2008). Хералдика и Срби. Београд: Завод за уџбенике. COBISS 152135692
- Драгосавац, Небојша (1996). "Бурна историја београдског грба" (PDF). Годишњак Музеја града Београда. XLIII. Archived from the original (PDF) on 20 September 2020.
