= Areius (disambiguation) =

Areius was the name of a number of people from ancient history and mythology:

- Arius Didymus, Alexandrian philosopher of the 1st century BCE; personal philosopher of Roman emperor Augustus
- Lecanius Areius, Greek physician who lived in or before the 1st century CE
- Areius Paianieus, archon of Athens in the 2nd century CE
- Zeus Areius, cultic epithet of the Greek god Zeus
- Areius, one of the Argonauts, son of Bias and Pero, brother of Talaus and Laodocus.
