= Amphora Workshop of Fasana =

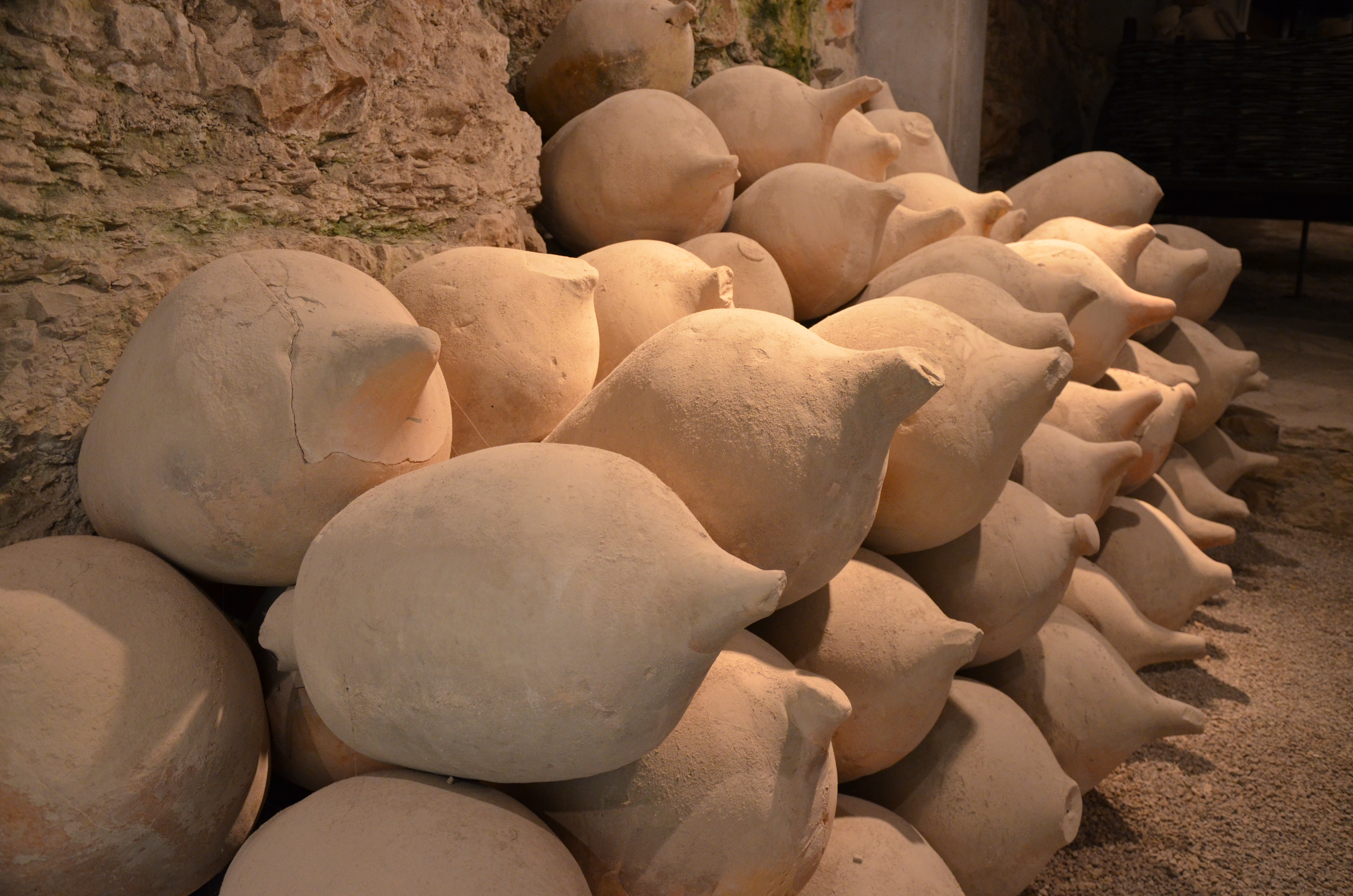
Amphorae at the underground exhibition of the Arena of Pola (Pula)

The Amphora Workshop of Fasana was a Roman factory (figlinae) of ceramics, chiefly amphorae, located in the Istrian town of Fasana.

== History ==
The workshop was located in the old center of the town of Fasana. Founded by the Romans, this town derives its name precisely from the local production of vases.

The workshop started to produce tiles and ceramics in the latter part of the reign of Augustus. The amphorae produced by the factory were used to store the products from Istria set to be exported, including grain, salted fish, wine and oil, which was notably produced in the hinterland of Fasana. The olive oil, which together with the wine was the most important product produced in Istria in Roman times, was then exported to the area of the Danubian basin, in the areas of present-day Austria, Hungary and Slovenia, and to the west along the Po up to Turin and Vercelli, also reaching the other parts of the empire, including Rome. The production of amphorae continued up to the second century AD.

In the first half of the 1st century AD, up to 78 AD, the workshop belonged to the local Lecanii family. This family had settled in Fasana shortly after 50 BC. The first known owner was praetor urbanus Gaius Laecanius Bassus. The workshop then passed to his son and namesake Caius (Gaius) Laecanius Bassus. Because the latter died without heirs in 78 AD, the workshop then passed to the Roman Emperor upon his death (that is, Vespasian).

Among the amphorae produced in Fasana are the Dressel 6B and Lamboglia 2, in which was stored the olive oil.

A striking feature of the amphorae produced here are the signatures (Amethysti, Crescentis, Viatoris, Opi, etc.) of the Fasana workers who were employed in the factory.
