= Laecania gens =

Ancient Roman family

The gens Laecania or Lecania was a minor plebeian family at ancient Rome. Members of this gens first appear in history during the reign of Tiberius. The first to attain the consulship was Gaius Laecanius Bassus in AD 40.

== Origin ==
The nomen Laecanius seems to belong to a class of gentilicia formed using the sufix -anius, typically derived from cognomina ending in -anus, or derived from other "a-stem" words. The name might be derived from the surname Laeca, which was used by a family of the Porcia gens, or from the same root.

== Branches and cognomina ==
The only important family of the Laecanii bore the cognomen Bassus, originally indicating someone stout. This family settled at Fasana in Istria shortly after 50 BC, and founded an important pottery workshop, which they owned until AD 78, when Gaius Laecanius Bassus died without heirs.

== Members ==
This list includes abbreviated praenomina. For an explanation of this practice, see filiation.

=== Laecanii Bassi ===
- Gaius Laecanius Bassus, praetor urbanus in AD 32, and consul in 40.
- Gaius Laecanius (C. f.) Bassus, consul in AD 64.
- Gaius Laecanius Bassus Caecina Paetus, probably one of the Caecinae adopted into the Lecania gens, was consul suffectus for the months of November and December in AD 70. He was governor of Asia from 80 to 81.
- Gaius Laecanius C. f. Bassus Caecina Flaccus, probably the son of Gaius Laecanius Bassus Caecina Paetus, the consul of AD 70, was buried at Brundisium in Calabria, aged eighteen.
- Gaius Lecanius C. f. Bassus Paccius Paelignus, named in an inscription from Rome.
- Quintus Laecanius Bassus, mentioned by Pliny the Elder as a contemporary who died after puncturing a carbuncle on his left hand. Possibly the same person as Gaius Laecanius Bassus, the consul of AD 64.
- Laecania, a woman whom Martial contrasted with Thaïs in one of his epigrams. Thaïs is said to have had black teeth, Laecania white; the reason being that Laecania wore false teeth, while Thaïs still had her own.

=== Others ===
- Lecanius or Laecanius, a soldier in the year of the four emperors, AD 69, and one of several persons said to have given Galba his death-blow.
- Lecanius Areius, a Greek physician, who probably lived in or before the first century AD. Few details of his life are known, but he was quoted in at least one passage by Galen, and perhaps on several subsequent occasions, although his identification is uncertain. He may have written on the life of Hippocrates.
- Laecanius Vitalianus, husband of Faminia Novatilla, and father of Gaius Laecanius Novatillianus.
- Gaius Laecanius Novatillianus, subprefect of the vigiles in the early third century AD, was the son of Laecanius Vitalianus and Faminia Novatilla, and father of Laecanius Novatillianus and Laecanius Volusianus.
- Laecanius C. f. Novatillianus, son of Gaius Laecanius Novatillianus, and brother of Laecanius Volusianus.
- Laecanius C. f. Volusianus, son of Gaius Laecanius Novatillianus, and brother of the younger Laecanius Novatillianus.

== See also ==
- List of Roman gentes

== Bibliography ==
- Gaius Plinius Secundus (Pliny the Elder), Naturalis Historia (Natural History).
- Marcus Valerius Martialis (Martial), Epigrammata (Epigrams).
- Publius Cornelius Tacitus, Annales, Historiae.
- Plutarchus, Lives of the Noble Greeks and Romans.
- Pedanius Dioscorides, De Materia Medica (On Medical Subjects).
- Soranus of Ephesus, The Life of Hippocrates.
- Aelius Galenus, De Compositione Medicamentorum per Genera (On the Composition of Medications According to their Kind), De Compositione Medicamentorum Secundum Locos Conscriptorum (On the Composition of Medications According to the Place Prescribed).
- Dictionary of Greek and Roman Biography and Mythology, William Smith, ed., Little, Brown and Company, Boston (1849).
- Theodor Mommsen et alii, Corpus Inscriptionum Latinarum (The Body of Latin Inscriptions, abbreviated CIL), Berlin-Brandenburgische Akademie der Wissenschaften (1853–present).
- René Cagnat et alii, L'Année épigraphique (The Year in Epigraphy, abbreviated AE), Presses Universitaires de France (1888–present).
- George Davis Chase, "The Origin of Roman Praenomina", in Harvard Studies in Classical Philology, vol. VIII, pp. 103–184 (1897).
- Paul von Rohden, Elimar Klebs, & Hermann Dessau, Prosopographia Imperii Romani (The Prosopography of the Roman Empire, abbreviated PIR), Berlin (1898).
- Paul A. Gallivan, "Some Comments on the Fasti for the Reign of Nero", in Classical Quarterly, vol. 24, pp. 290–311 (1974).
- Werner Eck, "Jahres- und Provinzialfasten der senatorischen Statthalter von 69/70 bis 138/139" (Annual and Provincial Fasti of the Senatorial Governors from AD 69/70 to 138/139), in Chiron, vol. 12 (1982).
- Olli Salomies, Adoptive and Polyonymous Nomenclature in the Roman Empire, Societas Scientiarum Fennica, Helsinki (1992).
