= Marcus Arrecinus Clemens (consul) =

1st century AD Roman prefect of the Praetorian Guard and consul

- Born: second quarter of the 1st century Unknown
- Died: Rome
- Military career
- Allegiance: Roman Empire
- Service years: 70 – 71
- Rank: Praetorian Prefect
- Commands: Praetorian Guard
- Other work: Suffect consul in 73; Governor of Hispania Tarraconensis; Suffect consul in 85; Urban Prefect of Rome in 86–87

Marcus Arrecinus Clemens (fl. 1st century) was a prefect of the Praetorian Guard during the reign of Vespasian. In return for his faithful service, Clemens was promoted to other important positions, including being twice consul and urban prefect of Rome.

Arrecinus Clemens was born into an equestrian family from Pisaurum, being the homonymous son of Emperor Gaius' Praetorian Prefect. Clemens' sister was Arrecina Tertulla, the first wife of the future Emperor Titus. Despite being a member of the Senate, he was placed at the head of the Praetorian Guard in 70 by Vespasian's political ally, Gaius Licinius Mucianus, amidst concerns that the current commander, Arrius Varus, was growing too politically influential. Clemens held the position until June of 71, when Vespasian's son Titus replaced him. According to Tacitus, Clemens was chosen because his father, Marcus Arrecinus Clemens, had honourably commanded the Guard during the reign of Emperor Caligula.

Following these events, Clemens held a suffect consulship in 73, governed the province of Hispania Tarraconensis, held a second consulship in 85, and was made city prefect of Rome in 86.

Suetonius relates a harrowing story concerning Clemens' end. The emperor Domitian invited Clemens to accompany him on a drive; as they passed a person both recognized, Domitian turned to Clemens and asked, "Shall we listen to that rascally fellow tomorrow?" The next day the "rascally fellow" was revealed to be a delator or informer who had brought charges on Clemens; the former Urban Prefect was found guilty and executed. However, Gavin Townend notes an inscription from Rudiae, in the extreme heel of Italy, on which one M. Arrecinus Clemens is commemorated by his wife Cornelia Ocel[lina], suggesting that Suetonius was in error and that Clemens was instead banished and died in exile.

Political offices
Preceded by Arrius Varus	Praetorian prefect 70–71	Succeeded by Titus Aurelius Fulvus
Preceded by Lucius Aelius Oculatus; Quintus Gavius Atticus as Suffect consuls	Roman consul 73 (suffect) with [...]m[ ...]	Succeeded by Sextus Julius Frontinus, and ignotus as Suffect consuls
Preceded by Quintus Julius Cordinus Gaius Rutilius Gallicus, Lucius Valerius Catullus Messalinus II as suffect consuls	Roman consul 85 (suffect) with Lucius Baebius Honoratus	Succeeded by Publius Herennius Pollio; Marcus Annius Herennius Pollio as suffect consuls
