= Veli Brijun =

Island of Croatia

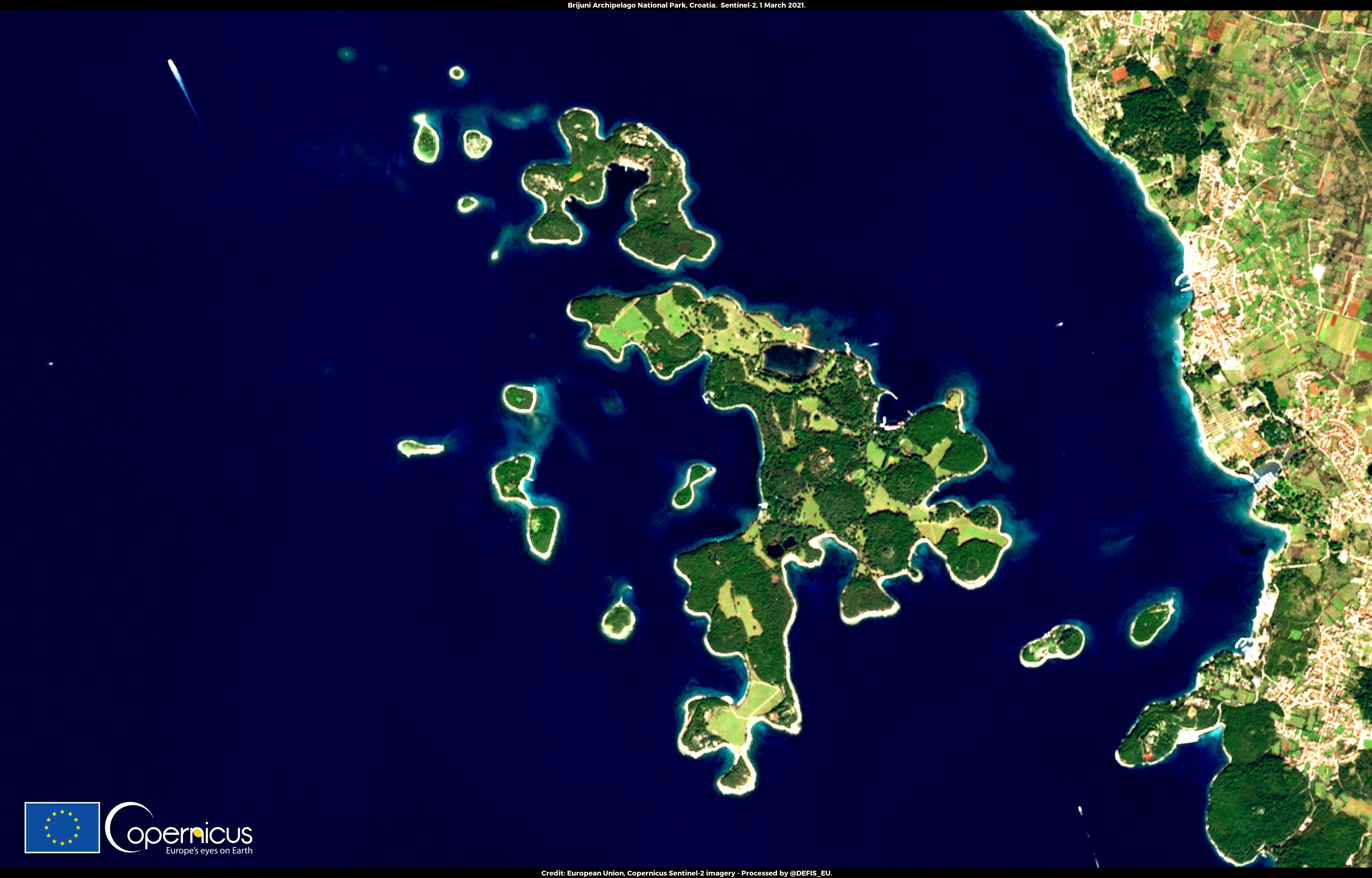
- Satellite image of Veli Brijun and the surrounding archipelago
- Interactive map of Veli Brijun

Geography
- Location: Adriatic Sea
- Coordinates: 44°54′55″N 13°45′55″E
- Archipelago: Brionian Islands
- Area: 5.72 km^{2} (2.21 sq mi)
- Coastline: 23.41 km (14.546 mi)
- Highest elevation: 54.7 m (179.5 ft)
- Highest point: Vela Straža

Administration
- Croatia
- County: Istria County

Veli Brijun (Italian: Brioni Grande) is an island in the Croatian part of the Adriatic Sea. It is located off the west coast of Istria in northern Adriatic and is the largest island in the Brijuni Islands (also known as the Brioni or the Brionian Islands) archipelago. Like most of the archipelago, Veli Brijun is part of the Brijuni National Park, established in 1983.

== Geography ==
The island lies 2 km west of the mainland town of Fažana and is located some 6 km away from the city of Pula. It is separated from mainland by the Fažana Channel (Fažanski kanal) which is only 12 meters deep, and geological evidence suggests that until some 10,000 years ago the whole archipelago was connected to the Istria peninsula. The island has an area of 5.72 km², which makes it the 41st largest Croatian island, and its coastline is 23.41 km long.

== History ==
Like most islands of the Brijuni archipelago, Veli Brijun was settled since prehistoric times, with the earlies traces of settlements going back to 3000 BC, or early Bronze Age. The Illyrians lived on the islands from around 1500 BC until Roman conquest in 177 BC and remnants of five Illyrian fortified hill forts were discovered on Veli Brijun. The most important Roman site on the island is at Verige Bay, where the ruins of a 1st-century villa rustica, a luxurious summer residence, can still be seen. After the fall of the Roman Empire in 476, the whole area came under Ostrogoth control, and during the Gothic War in the 6th century the islands were taken over by the Byzantine Empire. In 1331 the Republic of Venice took over and the island was ruled by a few Venetian aristocratic families. Starting in the early 14th century, regular outbreaks of plague and malaria decimated the local population, until the 17th century when the archipelago was de facto uninhabited. In the 19th century Austria-Hungary started fortifying the islands by building massive bastions and batteries, and two large forts on Mali Brijun and five smaller ones on Veli Brijun had been constructed for the defence of the monarchy’s main naval base at Pula.

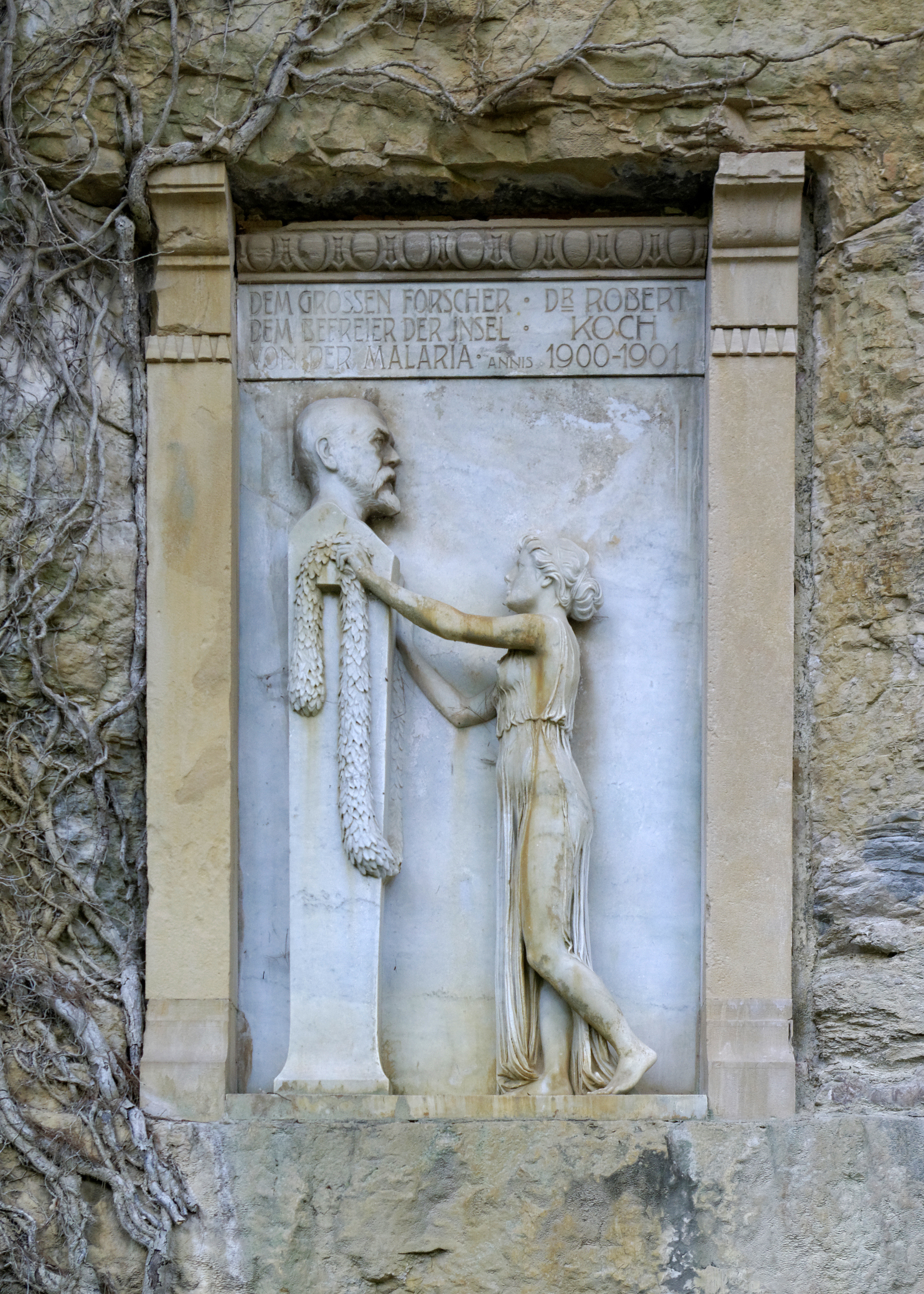
Monument to Robert Koch and the fight against malaria at Veli Brijun

In 1893 the whole archipelago, including Veli Brijun, was bought by the Austrian steel industrialist Paul Kupelwieser. Kupelwieser embarked on a project to transform the islands into an exclusive summer resort and health center. Construction works on promenades, swimming pools, stables, and sports grounds were started. However, the construction efforts were jeopardized by malaria outbreaks which occurred during summer months and even Kupelwieser himself fell ill with the disease. At the turn of the century Kupelwieser had invited the famous physician Robert Koch, who at the time studied different forms of malaria and quinine-based treatments. Koch accepted the invitation and spent two years, from 1900 to 1902, on the Brijuni islands. According to Koch’s instructions, all the ponds and swamps where malaria-carrying mosquitoes hatched were reclaimed and patients were treated with quinine. Malaria was thus eradicated by 1902 and Kupelwieser erected a monument to Koch, which still stands in vicinity of the 15th century Church of St. Germanus on Veli Brijun.

The first guests came to Veli Brijun in 1896, but the surge in number of tourists occurred after malaria was eradicated, from 1903 onwards. Although Kupelwieser already had acquired two boats to connect the islands to mainland, a more luxurious ship was needed to accommodate the wealthy customers, so Kupelwieser ordered a new ship powered by a fixed diesel engine which was the first of its kind in the shipbuilding world. The ship called Brioni III had provided postal and local travel services in the following decades and even survived both World Wars and was in service well into the 1960s. By 1913 the construction of hotel complex (with the total capacity of 320 rooms) and 10 villas was completed. Next to all these a new quay was built, along with a post office & telephone switchboard, some 50 km of roads and paths and a large beach. Also, an indoor swimming pool with heated sea water, a casino, and various sports grounds were built, including the largest golf course in Europe, with 18 holes and 5,850 meters of paths. The resort became a popular refuge for European elites, and news of arrivals of notable members from the aristocratic, cultural, scientific, and industrial circles of the time were regularly published in the island newspapers which were printed between 1910 and 1915.

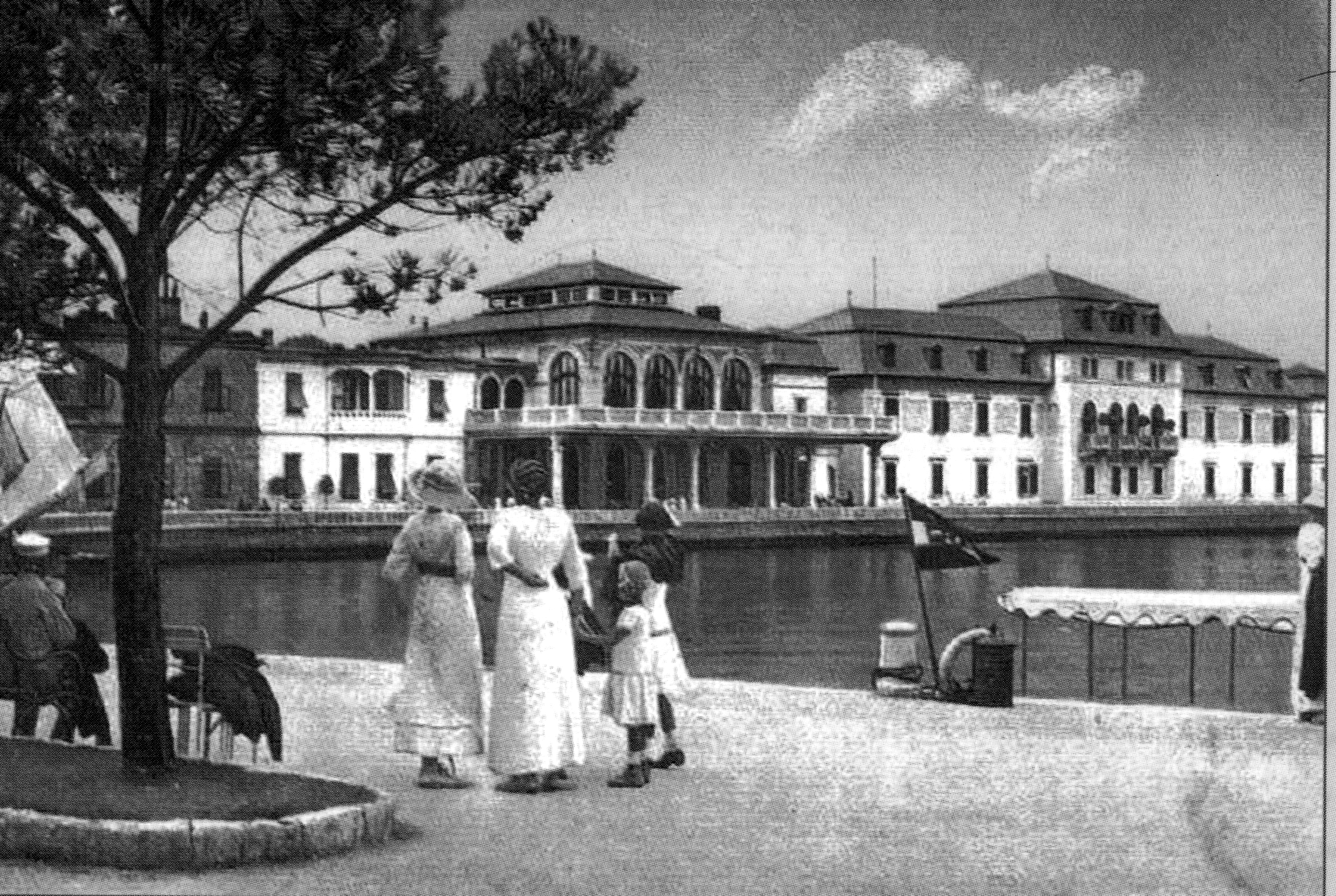
Early 20th century postcard showing the holiday resort

Although the islands soon gained popularity as an exclusive summer resort, Kupelwieser's plans for further development were interrupted by the outbreak of World War I, when some 2,600 Austro-Hungarian soldiers were stationed in the islands. When the war ended in 1918 the whole of Istria including its islands came under Italian sovereignty but the Brijuni archipelago remained the possession of the Kupelwieser family. Due to the increasing and stronger tourist competition Kupelwieser’s enterprise went bankrupt in 1936 and the islands came under the jurisdiction of the Italian Ministry of Finance. Soon after that a daily seaplane service to Brijuni was introduced but then World War II abruptly ended this new period of prosperity. The archipelago was turned into a naval fortification again and came under aerial attacks several times in the wake of World War II. In a bombing raid on 25 April 1945 two hotels, many houses and a large part of the quay were either badly damaged or completely destroyed.

After World War II, the island was turned into Josip Broz Tito's luxurious summer residence. Tito used the island from June 1947 to August 1979 for entertaining a great number of foreign ministers, dignitaries and heads of state. Since 1984 a permanent exhibition titled Josip Broz Tito at the Brijuni is housed on the island, where visitors can see a gallery of pictures documenting famous visitors entertained on the island. The exhibition includes pictures of visiting heads of state from 60 different countries, from the first such visit in 1954 by the Emperor of Ethiopia Haile Selassie I to the last one, the Guinea-Bissau's president Luís Cabral's visit in 1979. Other notable guests who visited the island in that period include Gamal Abdel Nasser, Jawaharlal Nehru, Eleanor Roosevelt, the Italian actress Sophia Loren and the novelist James Joyce.

In 1978 a safari park was created on the northern part of the island, covering an area of 9 hectares. The park is used as home to a number of exotic animals, most of which were brought to Tito as gifts from heads of states who were members of the Non-Aligned Movement. These include Nilgai antelopes (given by Jawaharlal Nehru in 1959), the Kob antelopes (given by Zambia in 1962), Somali sheep (given by Ethiopia in 1959), Zebus, zebras, Indian Elephants and llamas. In addition, the chital deer, the Fallow deer and mouflons were introduced to the island in the early 20th century. Their numbers increased in the following decades and can be seen roaming freely around the island.

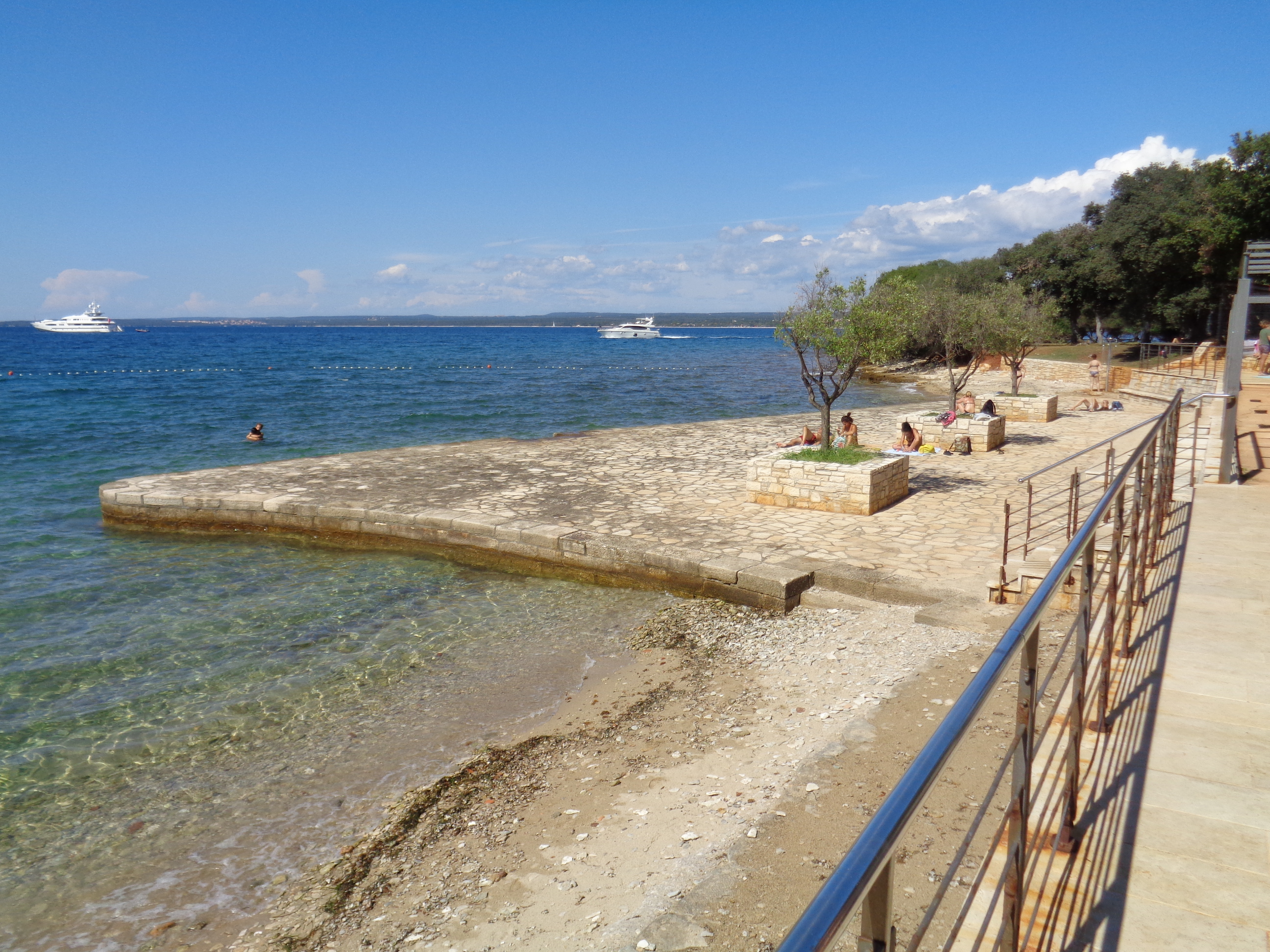
Veli Brijun beach

In October 1983 the whole archipelago was turned into a legally protected national park. Since the early 1990s the villas on the islets of Ganga, Galija and Madona west of Veli Brijun are used as the summer residence of Croatian presidents, and are guarded year-round by the small army garrison stationed on the islands. However, due to the lack of government investments in the existing infrastructure and the prohibition on new construction due to the island's status as a national park and protected reserve, the facilities at Veli Brijun and the Brijuni archipelago fell into a state of disrepair by the 2000s.

As of 2009, there are plans to upgrade existing hotels to at least a four-star rating, and to modernise the outdated sewer system and power grid. The plan, devised as part of the Brijuni Rivijera project, includes developing the Brijuni archipelago as a luxury tourist resort with a total accommodating capacity of 800 beds.

== See also ==
- Brijuni
- List of islands of Croatia
