= Arrius =

Arrius may refer to:

== Personal name ==
- the nomen or "gentile name" of the Arria gens, which identified a man as being a member of the gens - see the article for a list of those with the nomen
- Arrius Varus (fl. 69 AD), Roman soldier who supported Vespasian during the turbulent Year of Four Emperors
- Lucius Flavius Aper (died 284 AD), also known as Arrius Aper, a professional soldier who rose to become the Praetorian prefect
- Quintus Arrius, a fictional character in the novel Ben-Hur: A Tale of the Christ and various adaptations

== Other uses ==
- 5263 Arrius, an asteroid
- Turbomeca Arrius, a turboshaft helicopter engine
