= Mali Brijun =

Island in Croatia

- Location within Croatia
- Interactive map of Mali Brijun

Geography
- Location: Adriatic Sea
- Coordinates: 44°55′56″N 13°44′04″E
- Archipelago: Brijuni
- Area: 1.07 km^{2} (0.41 sq mi)

Administration
- Croatia
- County: Istria County

Demographics
- Population: 0

Mali Brijun (Italian: Brioni Minore) is an uninhabited Croatian island in the Adriatic Sea located west of Fažana, one of the Brijuni Islands. Its area is 1.07 km^{2} (0.41 sq mi).

Fort Brioni Minor is a coastal fortress in Mali Brijuni built by Austria in late 19th century in order to protect their main port of the Navy.

Map of the Brijuni islands
