= Lucius Valerius Catullus Messalinus =

1st century Roman senator and consul

Lucius Valerius Catullus Messalinus was a Roman senator during the Flavian dynasty, and is best known as the most hated and ruthless delator or informer of his age. He was feared all the more due to his blindness.

Bartolomeo Borghesi supposed Messalinus was the son of Statilia Messalina, third wife of Nero, but by a previous marriage. However, as Ronald Syme pointed out, that "would make her older than Otho (who was born in 32), and bring her close in age to Valeria Messalina." So in his stemma of the descendants of Marcus Valerius Messalla Corvinus, Syme makes Statilia and Catullus Messalinus sister and brother. However, Rutledge identifies the parents of Messalinus as Valerius Catullus and Statilia Messalina. It is unclear how he is related to the suffect consul of AD 31, Sextus Tedius Valerius Catullus, the only other consular Valerius Catullus.

Messalinus was twice consul. The first time was as consul ordinarius in AD 73, when he was the colleague of the emperor Domitian; Steven Rutledge observes this was "an exceptional honor, since of the twenty-four ordinary consulships held between 70 and 81, all but six were held by Vespasian and his sons." The second time was as consul suffectus with Quintus Julius Cordinus Gaius Rutilius Gallicus for the nundinium of March to April 85. That Messalinus held the consulate twice despite his blindness is a unique achievement: Richard Talbert notes that blindness would disqualify a man from membership in the Senate, let alone deprive him of seeking further office. Talbert cites the jurist Ulpian's opinion on this, as well as Dio Cassius' statement that in 13 BC Augustus would not consider anyone who was disabled for the Senate. Messalinus must have proven his worth to Domitian for the emperor to make these exceptions.

The names of none of the targets of his accusations or prosecutions have come down to us. Until August 93, Messalinus did not make any accusations in the Senate, instead playing a role behind the scenes in the consilium of the emperor Domitian; Tacitus writes how the "noisy counsels of Messalinus were not heard beyond the walls of Alba." Nonetheless, he is not known to have held any other official posts.

Messalinus had died by AD 97, the date of a dinner party hosted by emperor Nerva, the successor of Domitian, where he asked, "If he had gone on living, what do you think would have become of him?"

Political offices
Preceded by Sextus Marcius Priscus; Gnaeus Pinarius Aemilius Cicatricula as suffect consuls	Roman consul 73 with Caesar Domitianus II	Succeeded by Lucius Aelius Oculatus; Quintus Gavius Atticus as suffect consuls
Preceded by Domitian XI; Titus Aurelius Fulvus II as ordinary consuls	Roman consul 85 (suffect) with Quintus Julius Cordinus Gaius Rutilius Gallicus II	Succeeded by Marcus Arrecinus Clemens II; Lucius Baebius Honoratus as suffect
