= Marcus Arrecinus Clemens (praetorian prefect under Caligula) =

1st century AD prefect of the Roman Praetorian Guard

Marcus Arrecinus Clemens (fl. 1st century AD) was a prefect of the Roman imperial bodyguard, known as the Praetorian Guard.

Clemens was born in Pisaurum, Italy, to Arrecinus and Tertulla, members of an obscure family which, according to the historian Suetonius, was of equestrian rank. His sister Arrecina Clementina, also born in Pisaurum, c. 12, became the wife of Titus Flavius Sabinus.

Clemens' wife is usually identified as Julia, the sister of Julius Lupus. They had a son, Marcus Arrecinus Clemens, and a daughter, Arrecina Tertulla, who became the first wife of the future Emperor Titus.

Clemens served as prefect from 38 to 41, during the reign of Emperor Caligula. Suetonius says that Caligula bullied Clemens, often in front of the guards. On 24 January 41, Clemens participated in the murder of Caligula, the Empress Caesonia, and their daughter, as well as in the proclamation of the next emperor Claudius.

Government offices
| Preceded by Naevius Sutorius Macro | Praetorian prefect 38–41 with Lucius Arruntius Stella | Succeeded by Rufrius Pollio; Catonius Justus |
