= Pasqualino Gobbi =

Istrian Italian lawyer, cleric and author

- Archdeacon of Pola
- Church: Catholic Church
- Diocese: Diocese of Pola

Personal details
- Born: Before 1685 Pisino
- Died: c. 1729

Pasqualino Gobbi (fl. late 17th century – early 18th century) was an Istrian Italian scholar, Roman Catholic cleric and author, who became canon and Archdeacon in Pola. A doctor of both laws, he authored the chronicle Storia di Pola (1726).

== Biography ==
Gobbi was born in Pisino in the second half of the 17th century. According to university records, the Pasqualino Gobbi who studied in Padua since 1699 and graduated in 1709, and who later became canon and archdeacon of Pula, was a native of Pisino. Other sources mentioning Pasquale Gobbi, priest of Fasana and later archdeacon of Pula, author of the Storia di Pola, describe him as a native of Fasana.

In the last years of the 17th century, he went to study in Padua, at the local university, where he studied through 1699. He became doctor of laws, to then embrace an ecclesiastical career.

He became archpriest, vicar forane, and pro-vicar general of Pola.

Gobbi then became canon and vicar general in Pola, becoming the archdeacon in that diocese. He was parish priest of Fasana from 1715 until 1729, and then returned to the chapter of Pola as canon.

In 1726 he wrote Storia di Pola ("History of Pola"), a historical work on the city of Pola. The 215-page long manuscript, written in fitto carattere, was reported as lost by Pietro Kandler, but, by the late 1870s, it was reportedly available at the Stancoviciana library of Rovigno. By the 1900s it had been reportedly lost again. Pietro Kandler included in his Dizionario e Indice a 17-page booklet titled Note tratte dalla Storia di Pola dell'Arciprete di Fasana (poi arcidiacono) dott. Pasquale Gobbi, del Preposito Luzzich, e del conte Angelo Vidovich, itself containing a 7-page summary of Gobbi's Storia di Pola.

== Major works ==
- Storia di Pola ("History of Pola"), 215 pp., manuscript
