= Quintus Julius Cordinus Gaius Rutilius Gallicus =

1st century Roman senator, consul and governor

Consul of the Roman Republic
- In office September 70 – October 70
- Preceded by: Gaius Licinius Mucianus with Quintus Petillius Cerialis
- Succeeded by: Lucius Annius Bassus with Gaius Laecanius Bassus Caecina Paetus
- In office March 85 – April 85 Serving with Lucius Valerius Catullus Messalinus
- Preceded by: Domitian with Titus Aurelius Fulvus
- Succeeded by: Marcus Arrecinus Clemens with Lucius Baebius Honoratus

Personal details
- Born: Unknown
- Died: Unknown
- Spouse: Minicia L.f. Paetina

Military service
- Allegiance: Roman Empire
- Commands: Military tribune of Legio XIII Gemina; Governor of Galatia. Proconsular Governor of Africa; Governor of Germania Inferior; Urban prefect Pontifex

Quintus Julius Cordinus Gaius Rutilius Gallicus was a Roman senator who held several posts in the emperor's service. He was twice suffect consul: for the first time in the nundinium of September to October 70 AD; and the second time in 85 with Lucius Valerius Catullus Messalinus as his colleague, succeeding the Emperor Domitian.

Gallicus was well thought of by both the emperors Claudius and Nero. He was an important supporter of Vespasian in his early period as emperor and was rewarded by being made consul only months after Vespasian's arrival in Rome. Gallicus held a series of further civic and military positions, including three governorships, pontifex, and urban prefect of Rome.

== Family ==
He was often referred to by the shorter name Gaius Rutilius Gallicus, which Olli Salomies notes was his name prior to his adoption; Gallicus was a member of the gens Rutilia from Augusta Taurinorum, the modern Turin. The general consensus is that the adoptive element is Quintus Julius Cordius, and when his full name was used "Gaius" was frequently dropped. Although a Quintus Julius Cordius was the suffect consul of 71, Salomies doubts he was the adoptive father, although "no doubt closely related" to him. J. E. H. Spaul suggested his birth father was Gaius Rutilius Secundus, equestrian governor of Mauretania Tingitana during the reign of the emperor Claudius.

Gallicus was married and his wife's name is known from an inscription found in Augusta Tauricorum: Minicia L.f. Paetina.

== Biography ==
=== Offices under the Julio-Claudians ===
Gallicus' first known post was as military tribune of Legio XIII Gemina, which he is attested as holding in 52. This was followed by the Republican magistracies of quaestor and curule aedile. He then served again in the military as the legatus legionis, or commander, of Legio XV Apollinaris during the reign of the emperor Claudius. During Gallicus' term as commander the legion was stationed in Pannonia. Following this he was assigned to govern the province of Galatia in central Anatolia. In 68 Gallicus was co-opted into the sodales Augustales, the collegia of priests. This role was important to the Julio-Claudian dynasty, and the appointment is a clear indication that Gallicus was favored by the emperor Nero.

=== Offices under the Flavians ===
In addition to being favored by Nero, he was also well regarded by Vespasian. Gallicus was appointed consul by Vespasian very shortly after his arrival in Rome as a new emperor. The consulship was considered the highest honour the Roman state could bestow, and Vespasian would have made such appointments carefully, to reward loyalty and to consolidate support. Gallicus would have served alongside a fellow consul, but who this was is not recorded. During Vespasian's reign Gallicus was admitted to the College of Pontiffs, again a sign of the Emperor's high esteem.

He was Proconsular Governor of Africa in 73/74. Although being proconsul of Africa or Asia was considered a senator's highest and usually the final step in imperial service, Gallicus is known to have been Governor of Germania Inferior from 76 to 78. He was appointed consul for a second time seven years later by the emperor Domitian, serving with Lucius Valerius Catullus Messalinus. Gallicus' final office was urban prefect of Rome, which he held around 91.

== Death ==
Statius dedicated a poem to him (Silvae, 1.4), celebrating his recovery from illness. His recovery proved short-lived, as Statius notes Gallicus died from that same illness in the preface to the first book of Silvae, published not long after Gallicus' death.

Political offices
Preceded by Gaius Licinius Mucianus II; Quintus Petillius Cerialis as suffect consuls	Roman consul 70 (suffect) with ignotus	Succeeded by Lucius Annius Bassus; Gaius Laecanius Bassus Caecina Paetus as suffect consuls
Preceded by Domitian XI; Titus Aurelius Fulvus as ordinary consuls	Roman consul II; 85 (suffect) with Lucius Valerius Catullus Messalinus II	Succeeded by Marcus Arrecinus Clemens II; Lucius Baebius Honoratus as suffect consuls
