= Brijuni =

Island group off the coast of Croatia

Brijuni Islands National Park
- Nacionalni park Brijuni (Croatian)
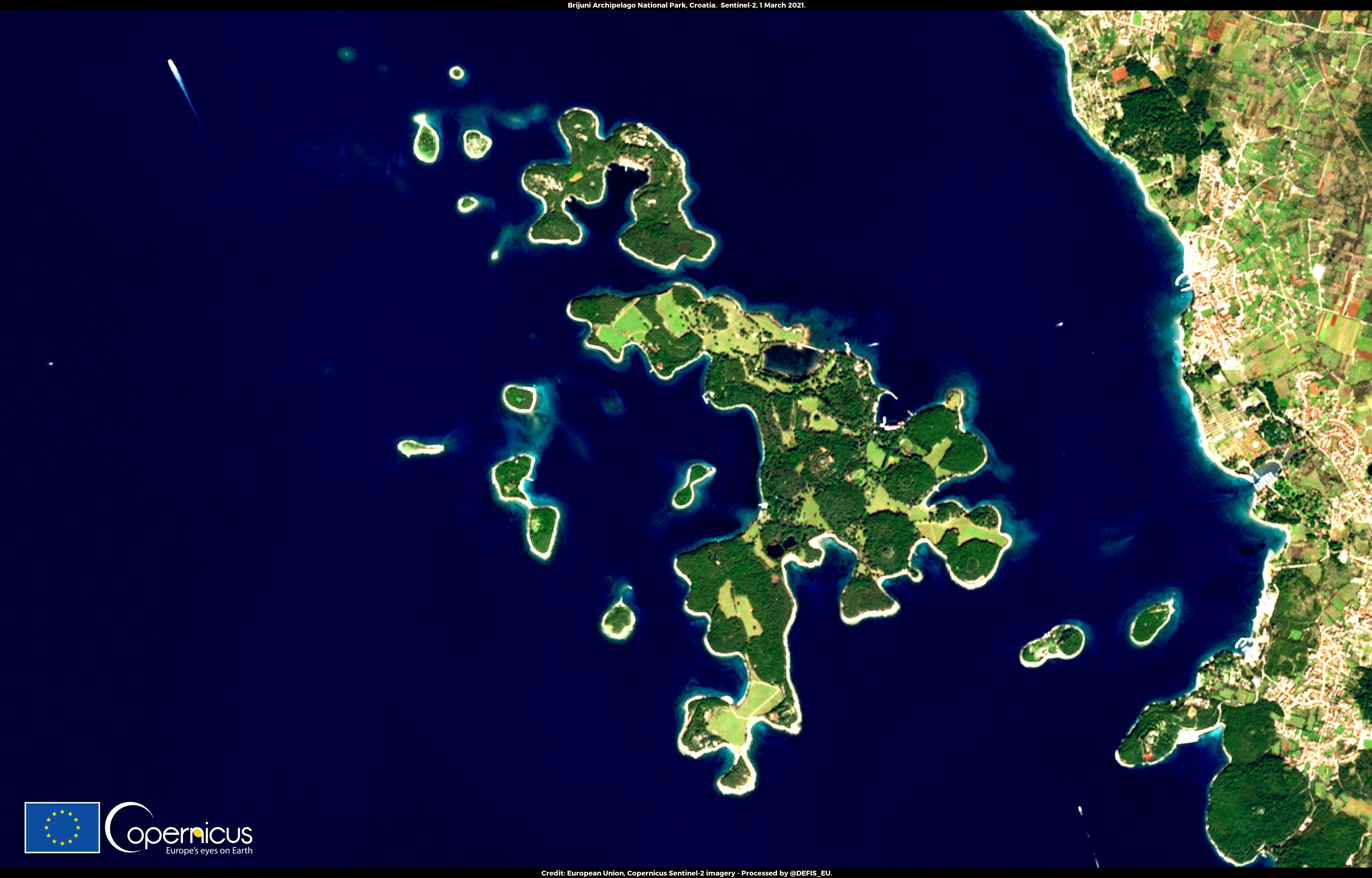
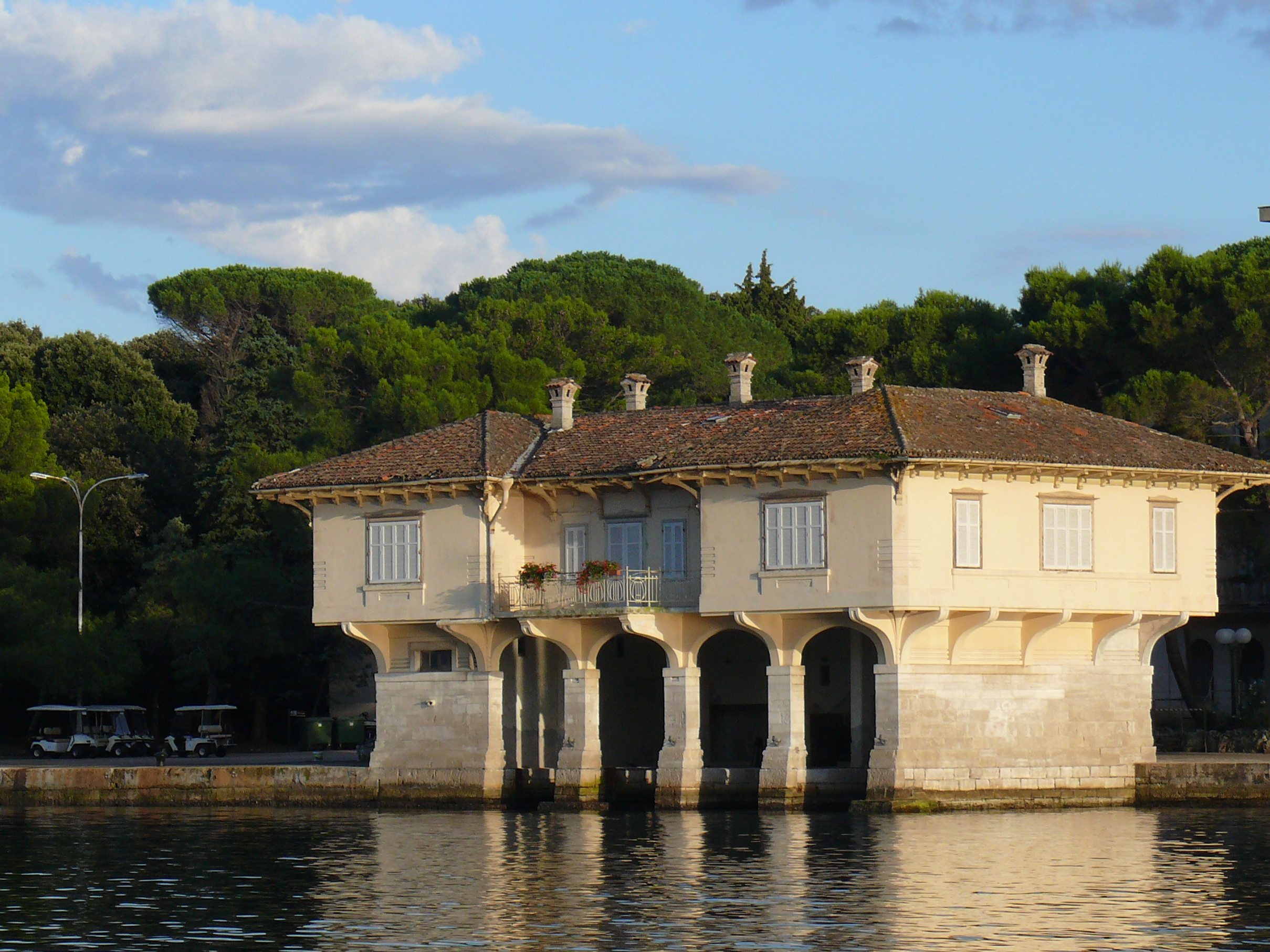
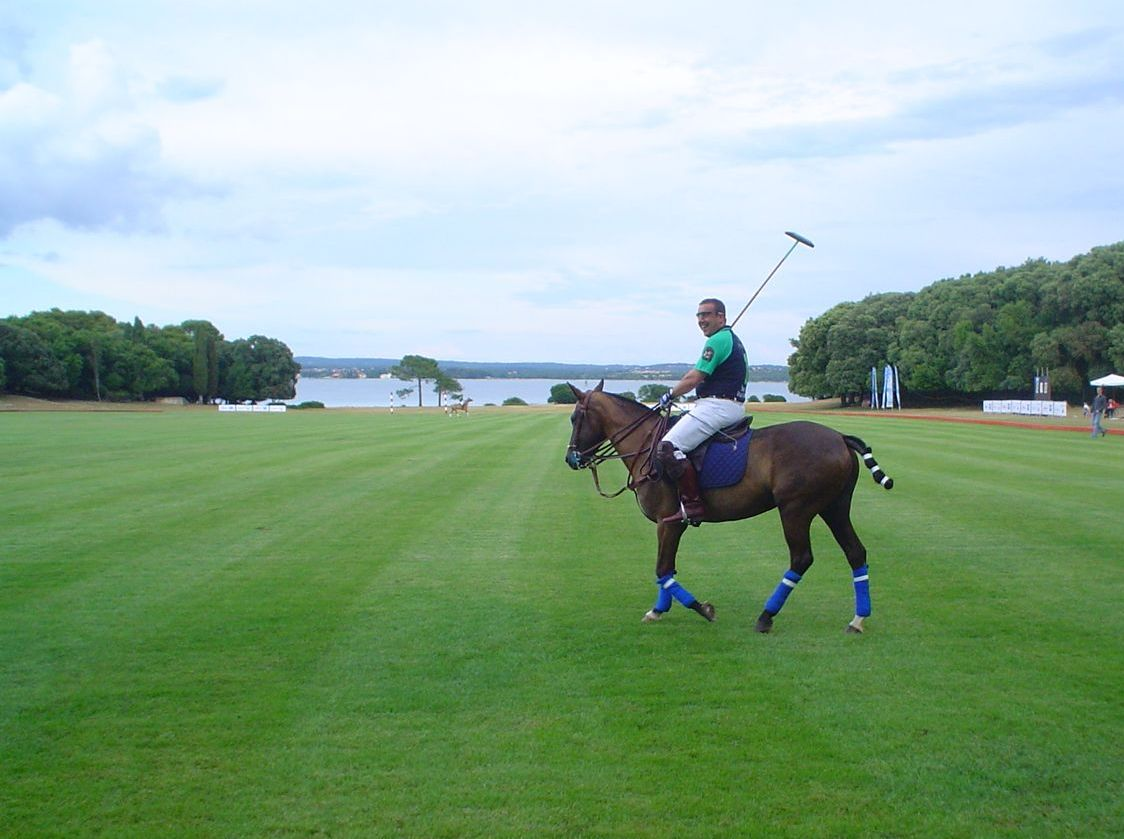
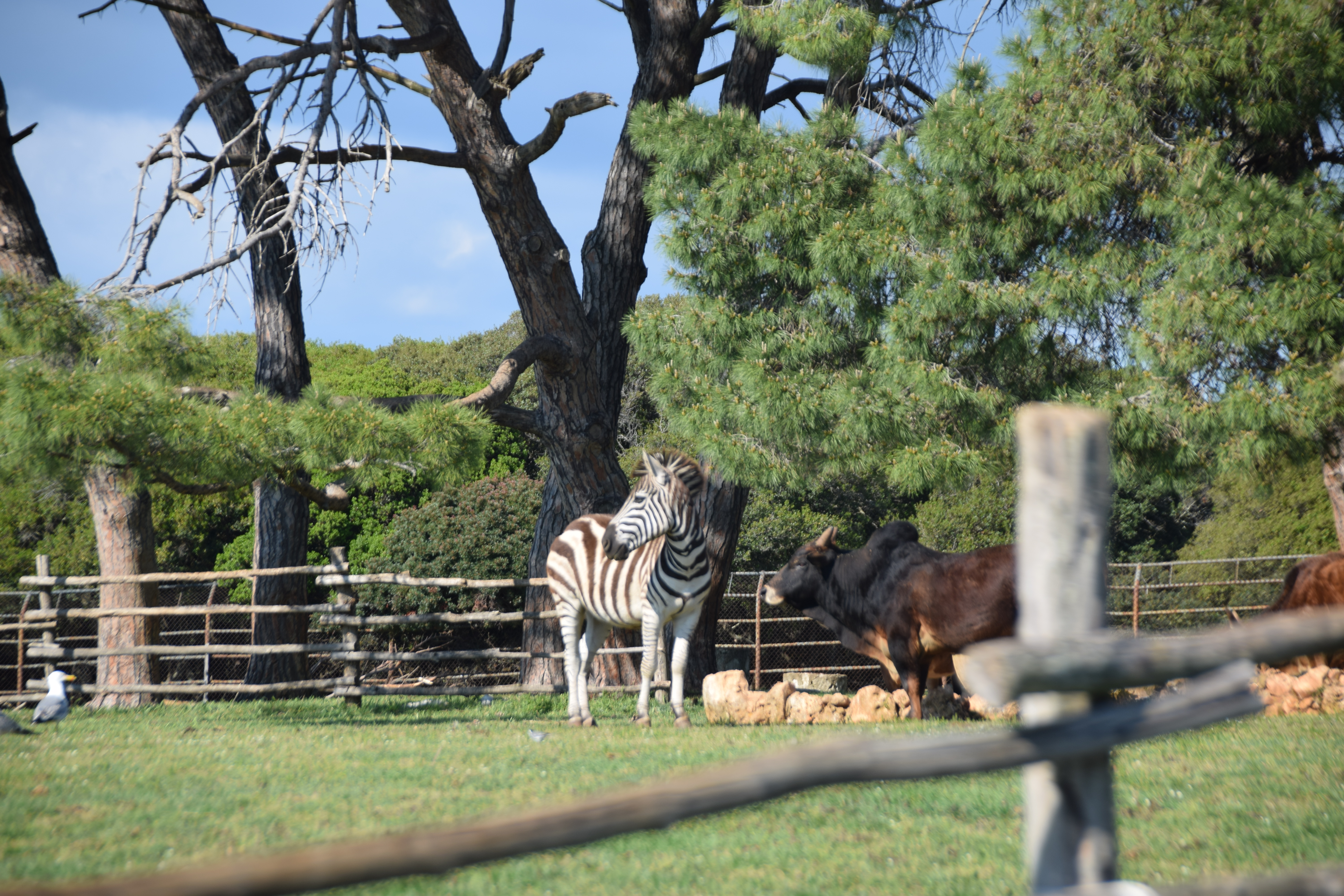
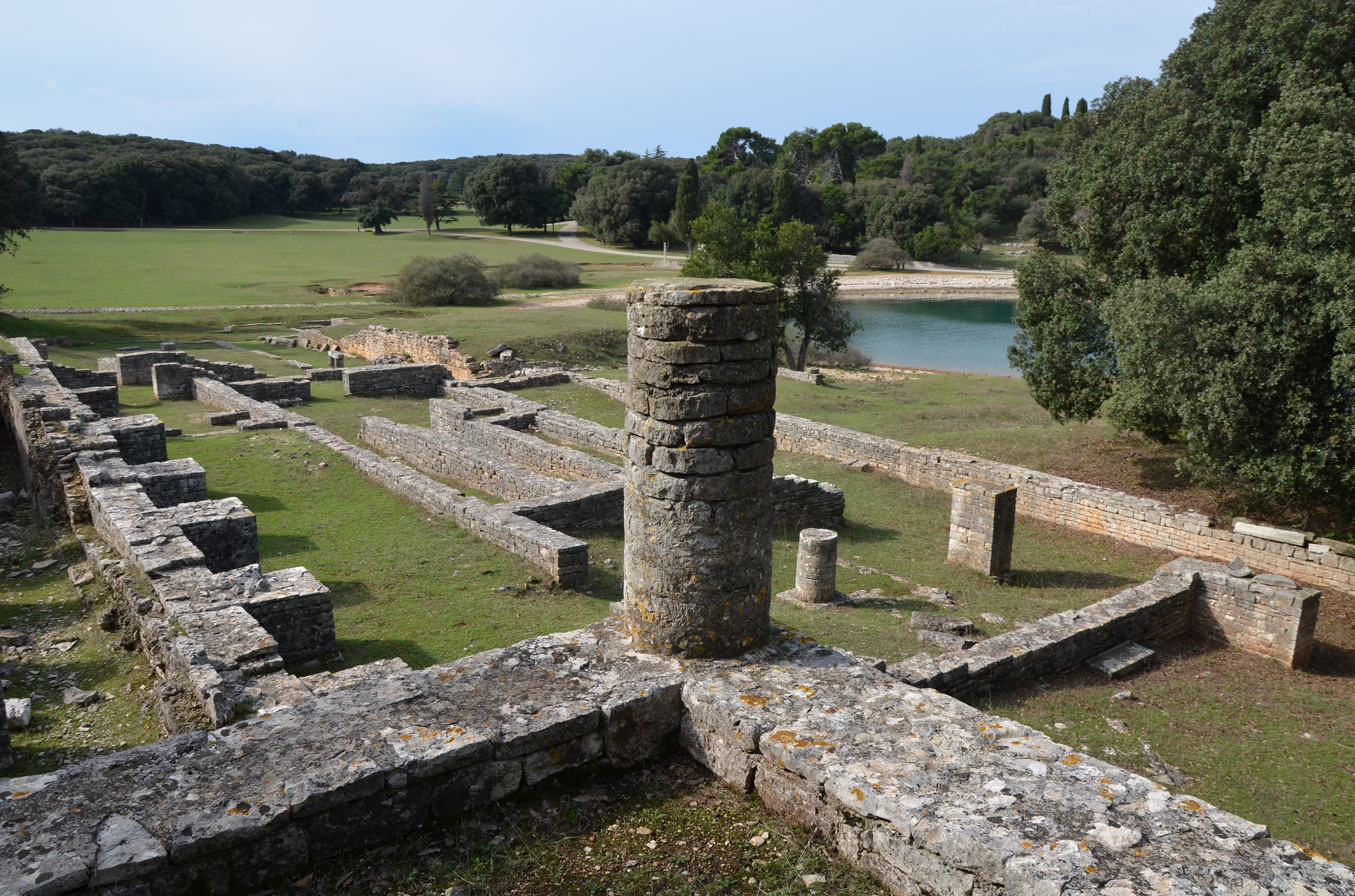
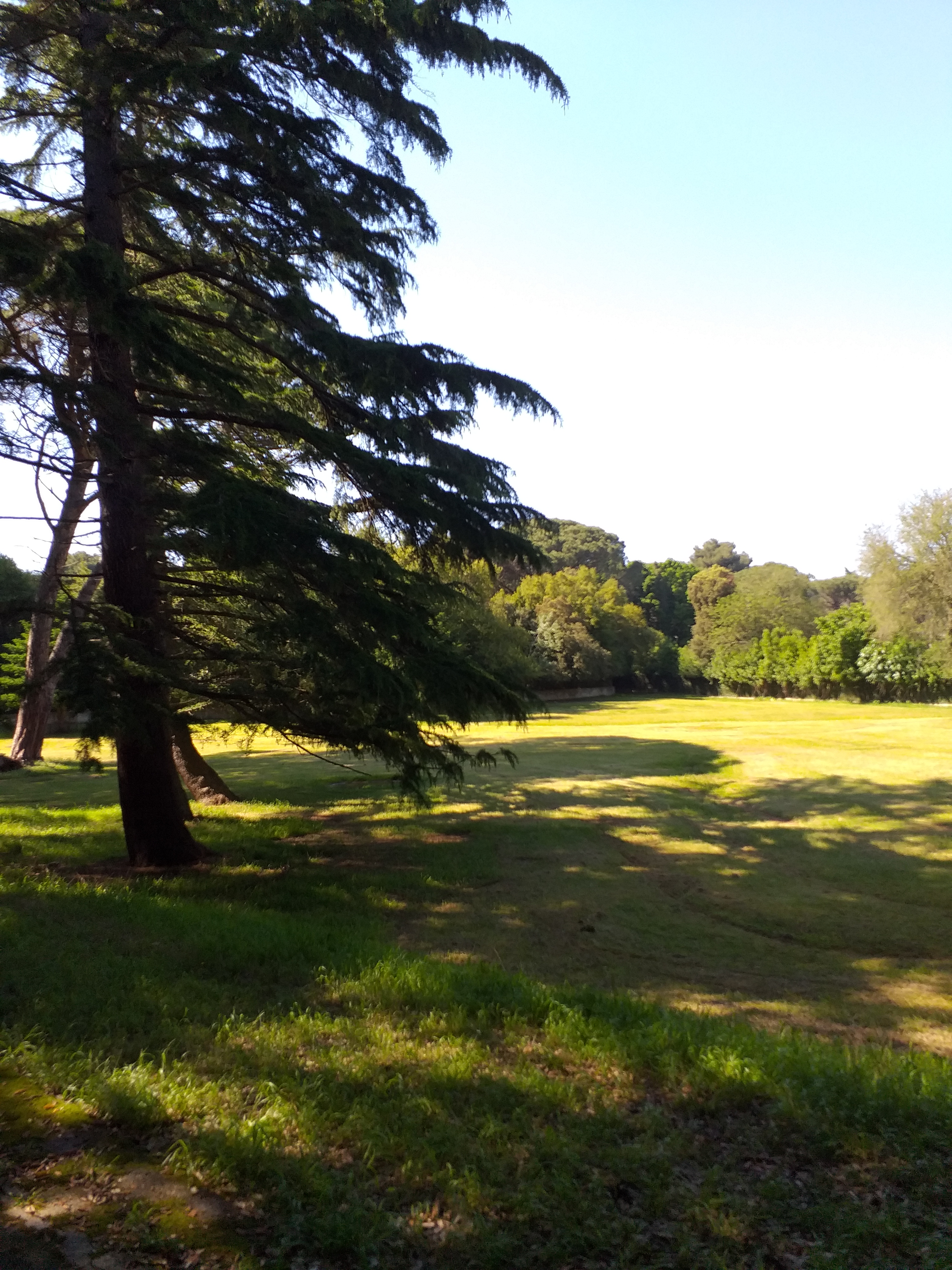
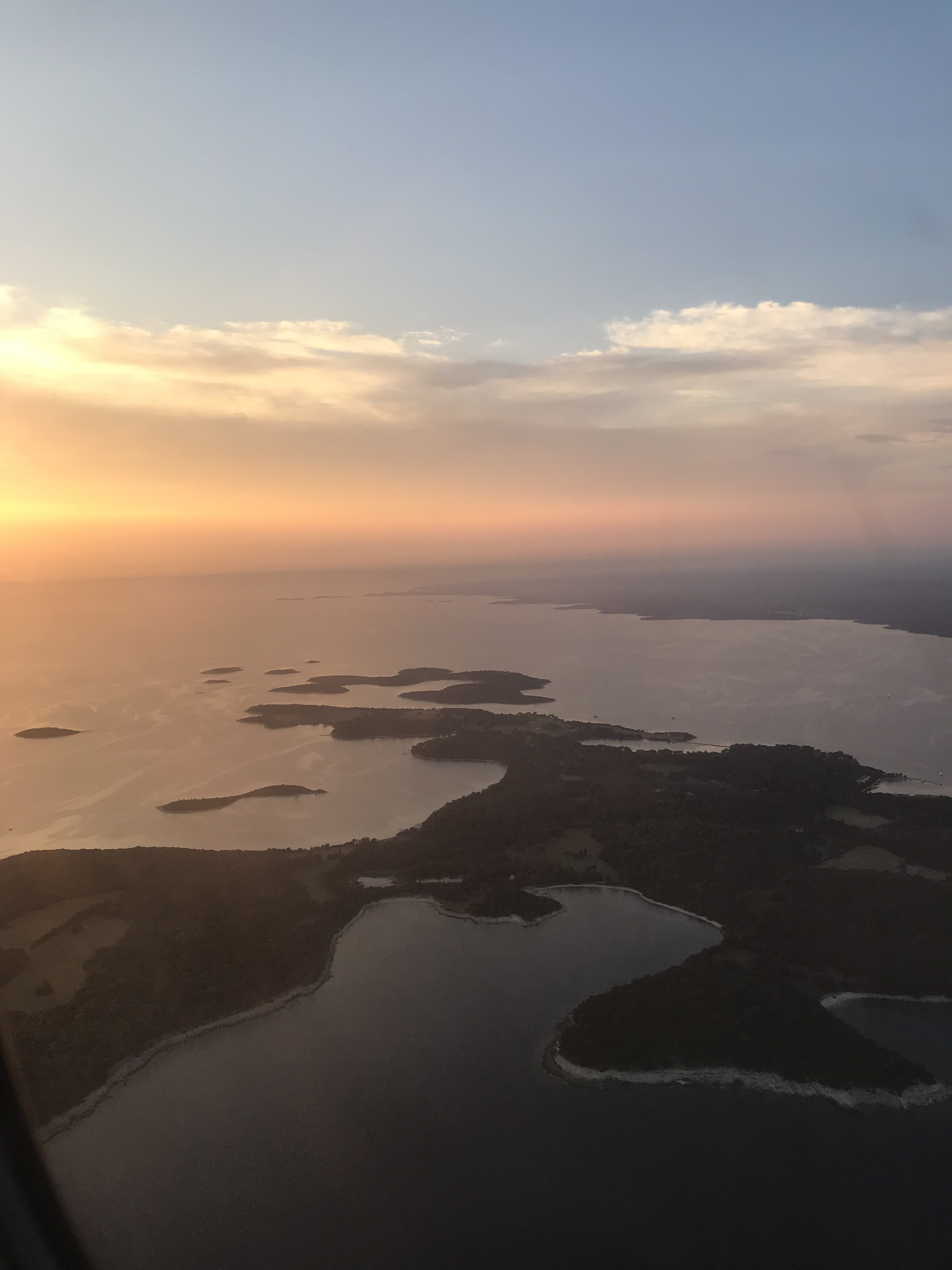
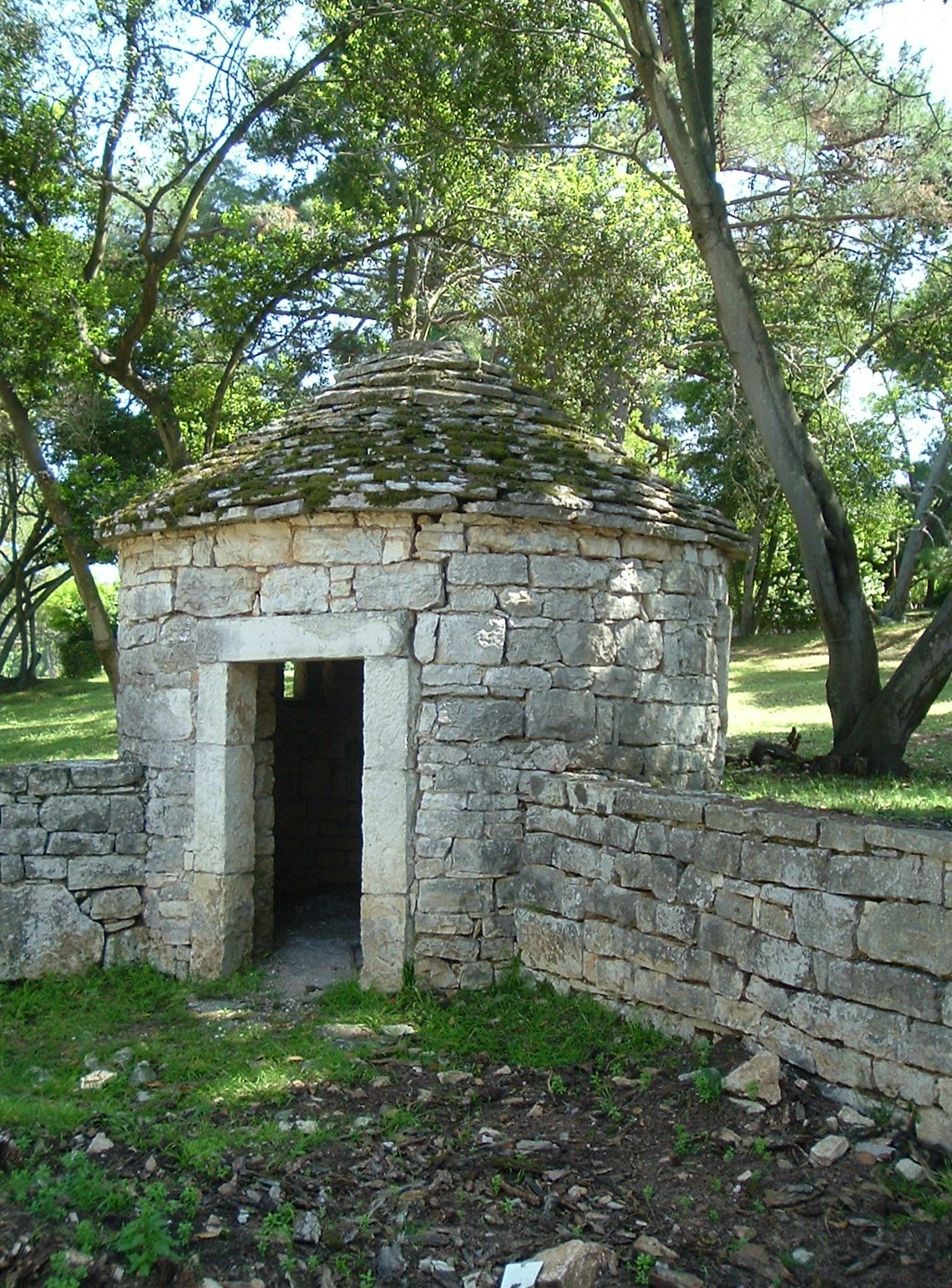
- Brijuni

- Location within Croatia
- 44°55′N 13°46′E
- Location: Croatia; Istria County

Site notes
- Area: 7.5 km^{2} (2.9 sq mi)

Protected Natural Value of Croatia
- Official name: Nacionalni park Brijuni
- Archipelago: Brijuni Islands
- Total islands: 14
- Major islands: Veli Brijun, Mali Brijun

The Brijuni (pronounced [brijǔːni]) or the Brijuni Islands (also known as the Brionian Islands; Italian: Isole Brioni) are a group of fourteen small islands in the Croatian part of the northern Adriatic Sea, separated from the west coast of the Istrian peninsula by the narrow Fažana Strait (a.k.a. Fasana Channel).

The largest island, Veli Brijun Island (also known as Italian: Brioni Grande or Croatian: Veli Brijun), (5.6 km^{2}), lies 2 kilometres (1.2 miles) off the coast. The second-largest island is Mali Brijun with an area of 1.07 square kilometres (0.41 sq mi), and twelve much smaller islands. Known for their scenery, the islands are a holiday resort and a Croatian National Park.

The islands gained worldwide fame in 1956 during the Brioni Meeting when the main leaders of the Non-Aligned Movement met with the host, Yugoslav president Tito, to form the Brioni Declaration which served as the foundation for the policies the movement would follow. Another event which took place on the islands was the 1991 Brioni Agreement.

== History ==
Map of the Brijuni islands

The Brijuni islands were called Pollariae or Pullariae (Πολλάριαι) by the ancient Greeks, and later, they were called Brioniano.

The Brijuni Islands had some Ancient Roman settlements, but up to the late 19th century the islands were mainly used for their quarries, which have been worked on for centuries. The islands belonged to Venice from the Middle Ages, and stone from the islands was used to build the palaces and bridges of the city. The islands were part of the Illyrian Provinces after Napoleon's brief annexation.

In 1815 the islands became part of the Austrian Empire, which later became Austria-Hungary. During this period the islands' quarries first supplied stone to Vienna and Berlin. With the erection of a naval base in the harbour of Pula, the Austrians built a strong fortress, "Fort Tegetthoff," on Veli Brijun Island Island, together with minor fortifications on some of the others.

The Austro-Hungarian Navy abandoned the fortress, and in 1893 the Viennese business magnate Paul Kupelwieser bought the whole archipelago and began to create an exclusive beach resort. In 1900 Kupelwieser invited Robert Koch, the renowned microbiologist, to conduct his malaria eradication experiments on Brijuni. Koch and his associates were successful, and in 1901 the island was declared malaria-free.

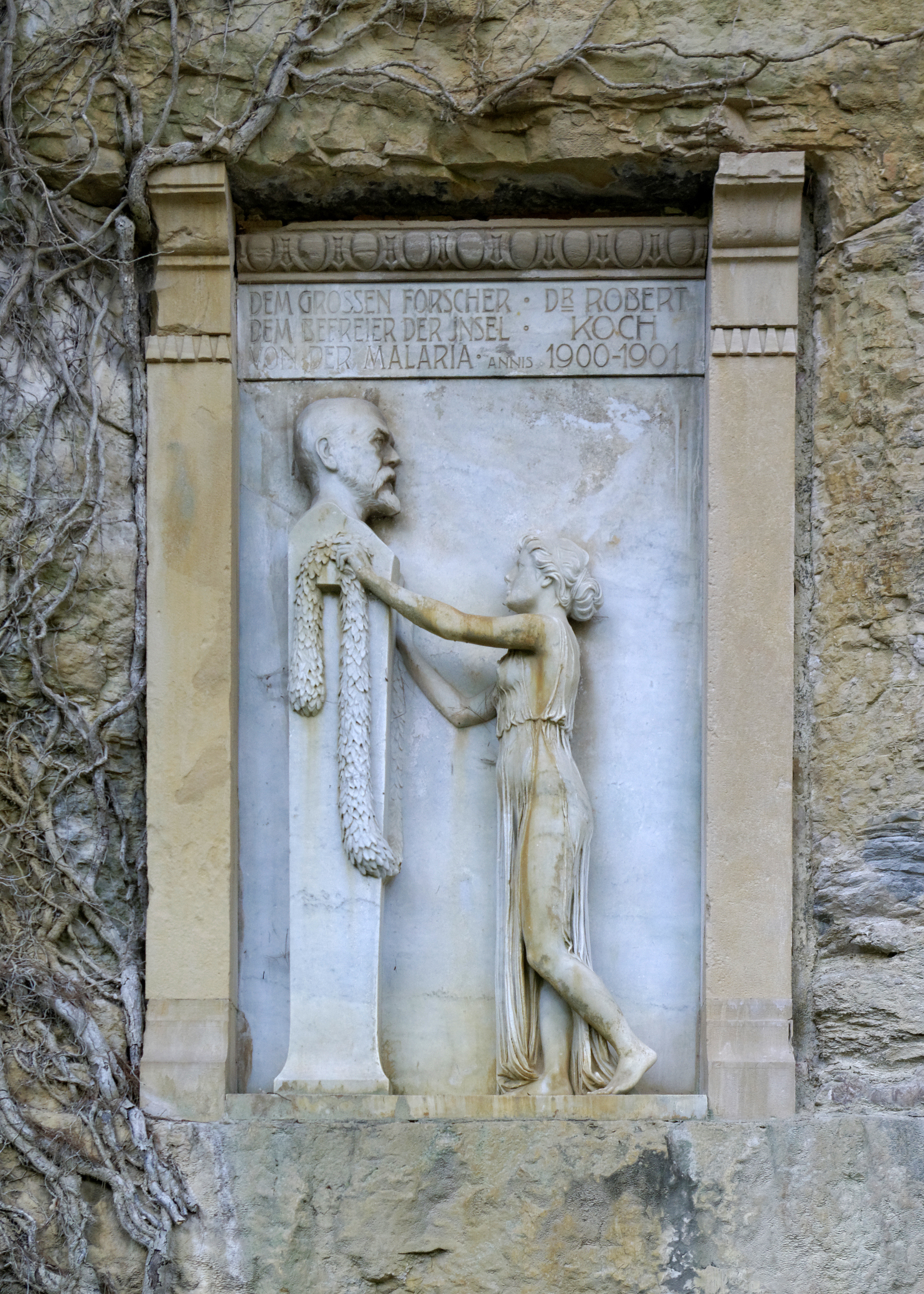
Robert Koch commemoration for eradication of malaria on the island

The estate was supplemented with a harbour, water of the Istrian hills down under the sea, wonderful parks, vineyards, milk-oeconomy ("Imperial cheese" was famous; James Joyce enjoyed it), first class hotels, a bath inside with warm saltwater, restaurants, beach resorts, tennis and a yacht harbour and became a focal point in social life on the Austrian Riviera. Many famous poets, actors, artists visited the isle (Hugo Charlemont painted about 150 pictures showing Brionian motives). Kupelwieser also established a sailing regatta and – due to the flourish of Austrian Culture – various musical concerts and literature events. The Brijuni islands (called always Brioni) became popular as a destination for the Viennese upper class, people of industry and culture and were visited by members of the Imperial family. During The Great War the Austro-Hungarian navy had a submarine base here.

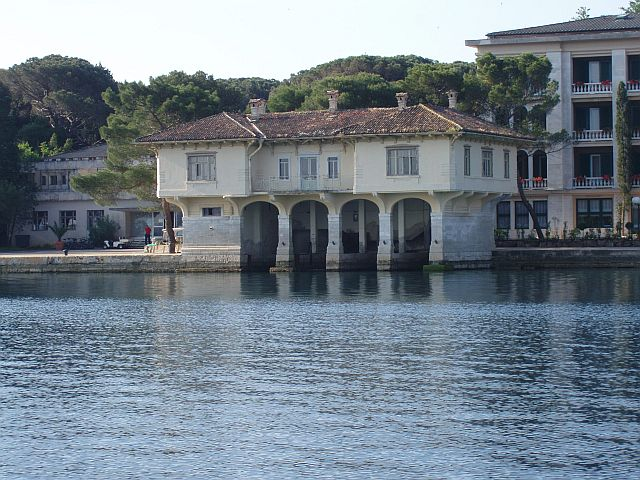
The main port on Brijuni, showing the 1902 boathouse.

In 1918 after World War I - Paul Kupelwieser died in 1919 in Vienna - Brijuni became part of the state of Italy. Karl Kupelwieser, the son of the founder of the estate, tried to maintain the former splendor, but more international. He invited wealthy European bourgeois and aristocrats. Brioni should be an isle of sports, he organised international games on the first European golf course with 18 holes (1922) and a polo court. Professional players lived in the hotels and horses werde waiting permanent for guests, a Casino with high taxes by Italy made great financial problems. The estate went bankrupt and Karl committed suicide in 1930. The heirs were three sisters, the granddaughters of Paul Kupelwieser. 1936 ownership of the islands was acquired by the Italian government due to the bankruptcy, and they remained part of Italy until the capitulation in 1943. German soldiers were there from 1943 until end of the war.

In 1945 after World War II the Brijuni became part of Yugoslavia and President Marshal Josip Broz Tito made the Brijuni Islands his personal State Summer Residence. Slovenian architect Jože Plečnik designed a pavilion for Tito. Almost 100 foreign heads of state visited Tito on his islands, along with film stars including Elizabeth Taylor, Richard Burton, Sophia Loren, Carlo Ponti, and Gina Lollobrigida. Tito died in 1980, and by 1983 the islands were declared a National Park of Yugoslavia.

In mid-July 1956, President of Egypt Gamal Abdel Nasser, Prime Minister of India Jawaharlal Nehru, and President of Yugoslavia Josip Broz Tito met here to discuss their opposition to the Cold War. These ideas later crystallized into the Non-Aligned Movement. Vijay Prashad has compared this meeting to the Yalta Conference. Brijuni Islands were initially considered to host the 1st Summit of the Non-Aligned Movement yet the City of Belgrade was ultimately selected due to Brijuni's insufficient venues and concentration of the international communication and media facilities in the capital city of Yugoslavia. Brijuni hosted the 1987 Mediterranean Non-Aligned Countries Ministerial Meeting as well.

In 1991 Croatia gained independence and made the Brijuni Islands an International Conference Center (see Brioni Agreement). Four hotels on Veli Brijun Island were re-opened, as well as a Safari Park, which holds animals given to Tito, such as Sony and Lanka, two Indian elephants donated by Indira Gandhi. Sony, who was donated to Tito in 1970 as a two-year-old calf, died in 2010. The International Brijuni Polo Tournament, dating back to Karl Kupelwieser's Austro-Italian Brijuni in 1924, was relaunched in 2004.

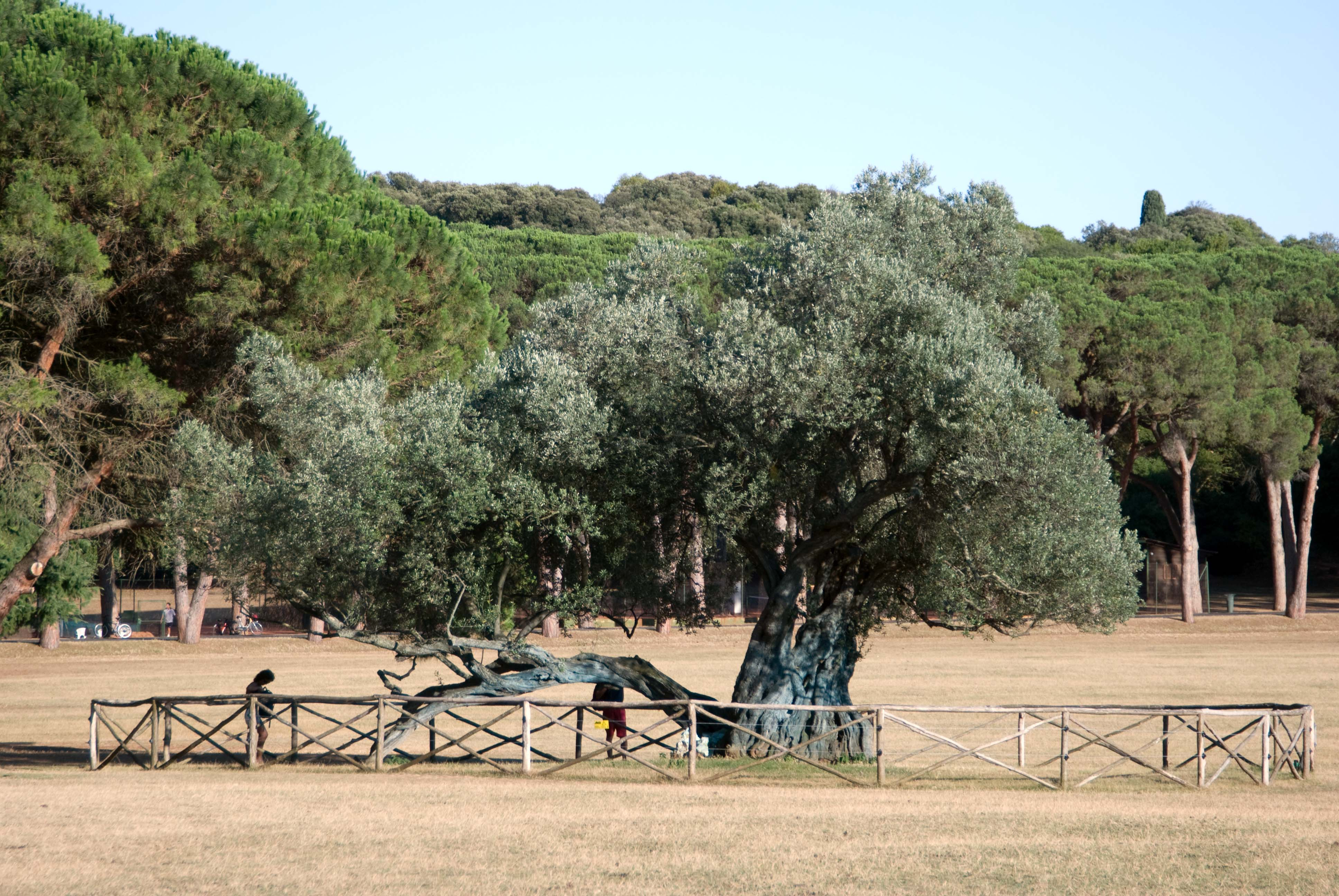
1700-year-old olive tree

== Flora ==
Most of the flora on the archipelago of the Brijuni islands has the typical Mediterranean characteristics. On Veli Brijun Island there are about 600 indigenous plant species. Here cedars, bamboos, and the pyramidal yew have become acclimatised, while on Vanga the dwarf spruce grows. There is also much exotic vegetation that Tito received from foreign statesmen. The most important plant associations of Veli Brijun Island are: Maquis shrubland, holm oak, and Laurel forest, and Conifers, which are very characteristic of the region.

On the islands there are some plant species that are among the endangered plant species of Istria (marine poppy, wild cucumber, some grass species etc.), but on the islands they are widespread and develop freely. The most valuable part of the island from the point of view of vegetation stretches from the Villa Brijunka in the south, and the forest is found in the east of the White Villa.

== Fauna ==
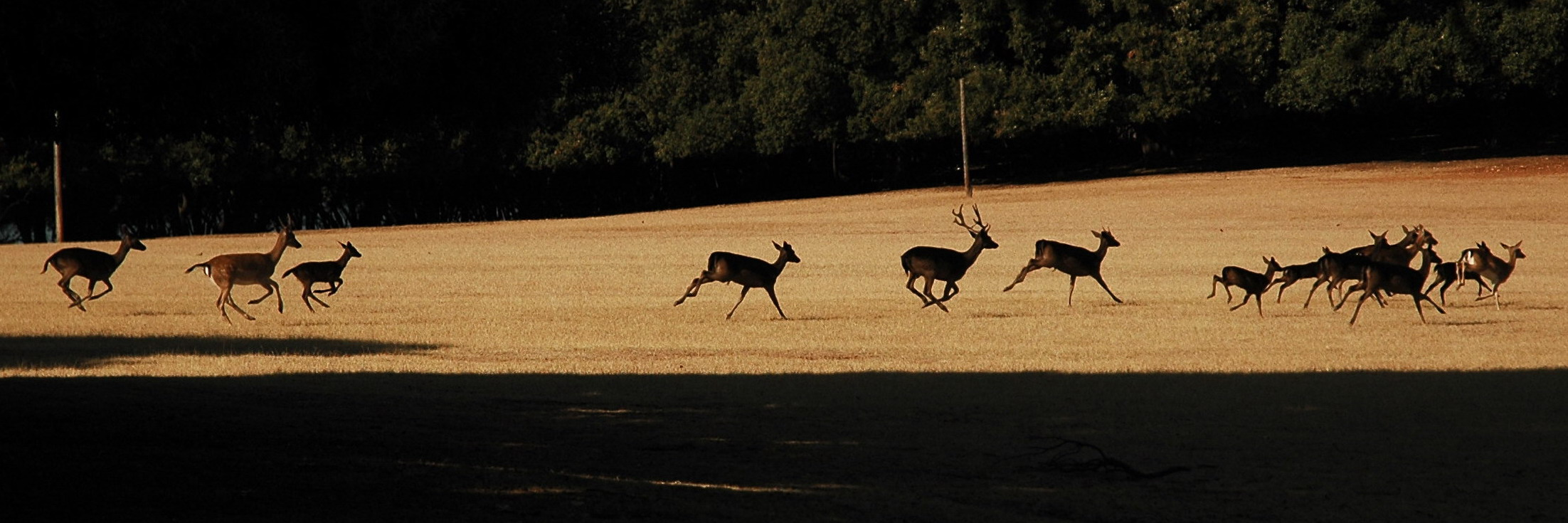
The Safari Park

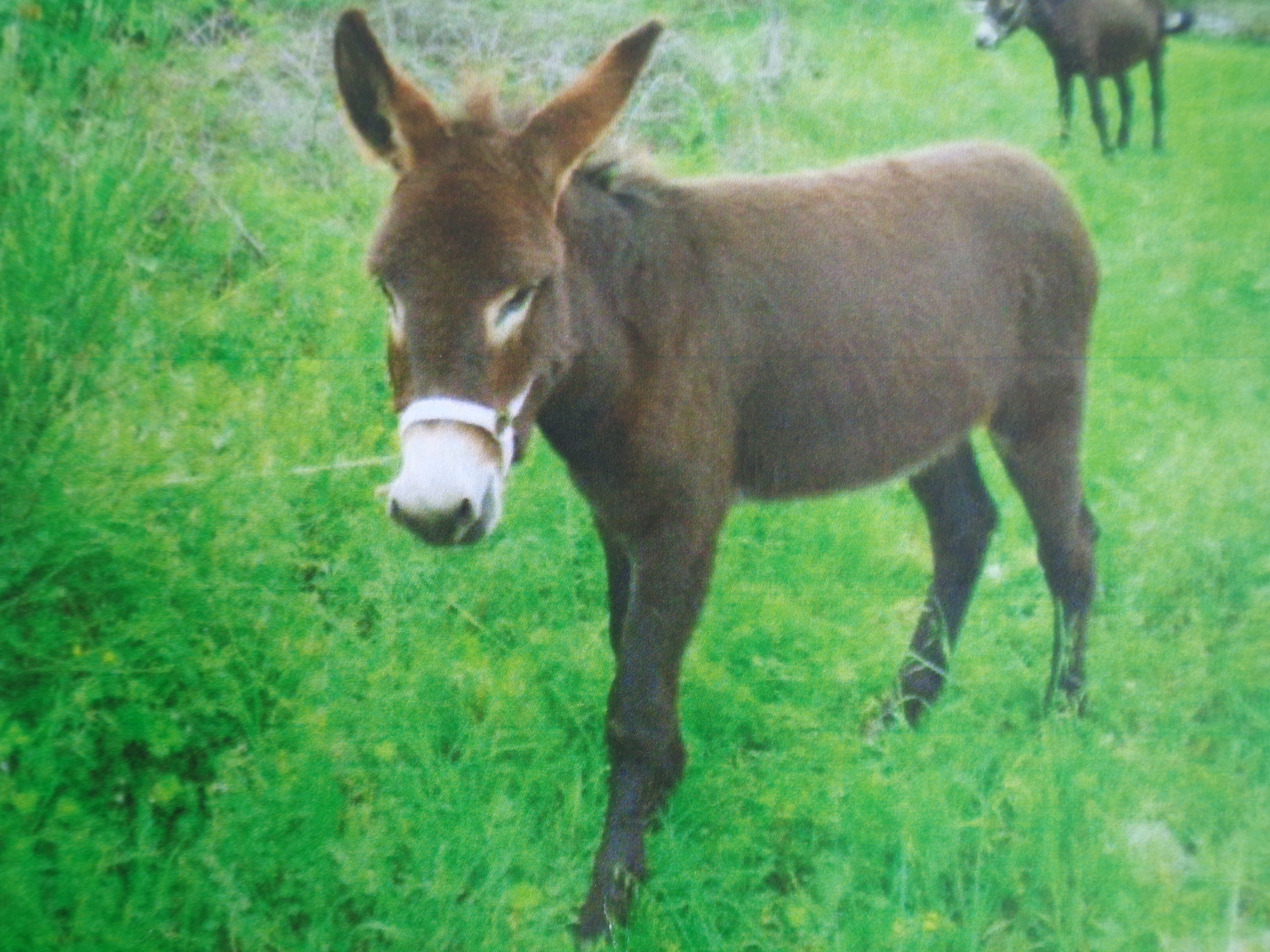
Istrian donkey

Because of the millennial presence of men on the archipelago of Brijuni, the animal world on the islands, especially Veli Brijun, besides the autochthonous species, was enriched by many imported species that are not congenial to this habitat but got acclimated to it thanks to the almost ideal microclimatic conditions. Inside the park there is an ethno park is an area within the Safari park presenting a typical Istrian homestead with its autochthonous animal species. Istrian ox (a descendant of the Aurochs), Istrian sheep, donkeys and goats. It is intended both as a habitat and presentation of domestic animals of Istria.

In addition, the chital deer, fallow deer and mouflons were introduced to the Veli Brijun Island in the early 20th century. Their numbers increased in the following decades and can be seen roaming freely around the island.

In the late 19th century and early 20th century the European hare, the chital, the fallow deer and the mouflon were imported, so their descendants still adorn the forests, parks and glades of Brijuni and are part of its identity. The autochthonous birds are quite well represented. Some of the smaller islands are excellent habitats where gulls and sea swallows nest, as well as some rare genera of cormorants. The Brionian islands are also important seasonal habitats of northern bird species and the most interesting is the locality of Saline. That is a very damp area with three marshy lakes of 8 acres (32,000 m^{2}) of fenced area with the aim of forming an ornithology reservation. The biggest lake is overgrown with reed and is a good nestling ground for numerous types of birds.

On the island there is also a Safari Park, it is home to a variety of exotic animals which were given to the park as gifts from diplomatic partners. The nilgai, zebu and Asian elephant were donated as a gift from India, plains zebra and mountain zebra were given by Ahmed Sékou Touré from Guinea, waterbuck came from Ethiopia.. As Titos animals died one after the other - Indira Ghandis male elefant Sony died 2010, widow Lanka is now alone - they made an Ethnopark. No camels, antilopes, but more and more Istrian animals.

The local seas of the Brijuni archipelago are important hatching grounds and representative marine parks for the typical marine organisms of the northern Adriatic. Of the marine organisms that are protected by the Law on Environmental Conservation in the waters of Brijuni you can find the pen-shell and the date-shell. Sea turtles and dolphins, the protected marine vertebrates, can also from time to time be seen in the waters of Brijuni. There are also some endemic species like the black tang, Jadranski bračić, and the Tunicate, Jadranski ciganin.

The seabed abounds in sponges, shellfish, sea urchins, crustaceans, fish etc. In the past in the seas of Brijuni were found some species that were never seen in the Adriatic, as well as some species up to then unknown to scientists like the soft coral Alcyonium brionense or the variety of the sponge Ircinia variabilis fistulata.

== Tourism ==
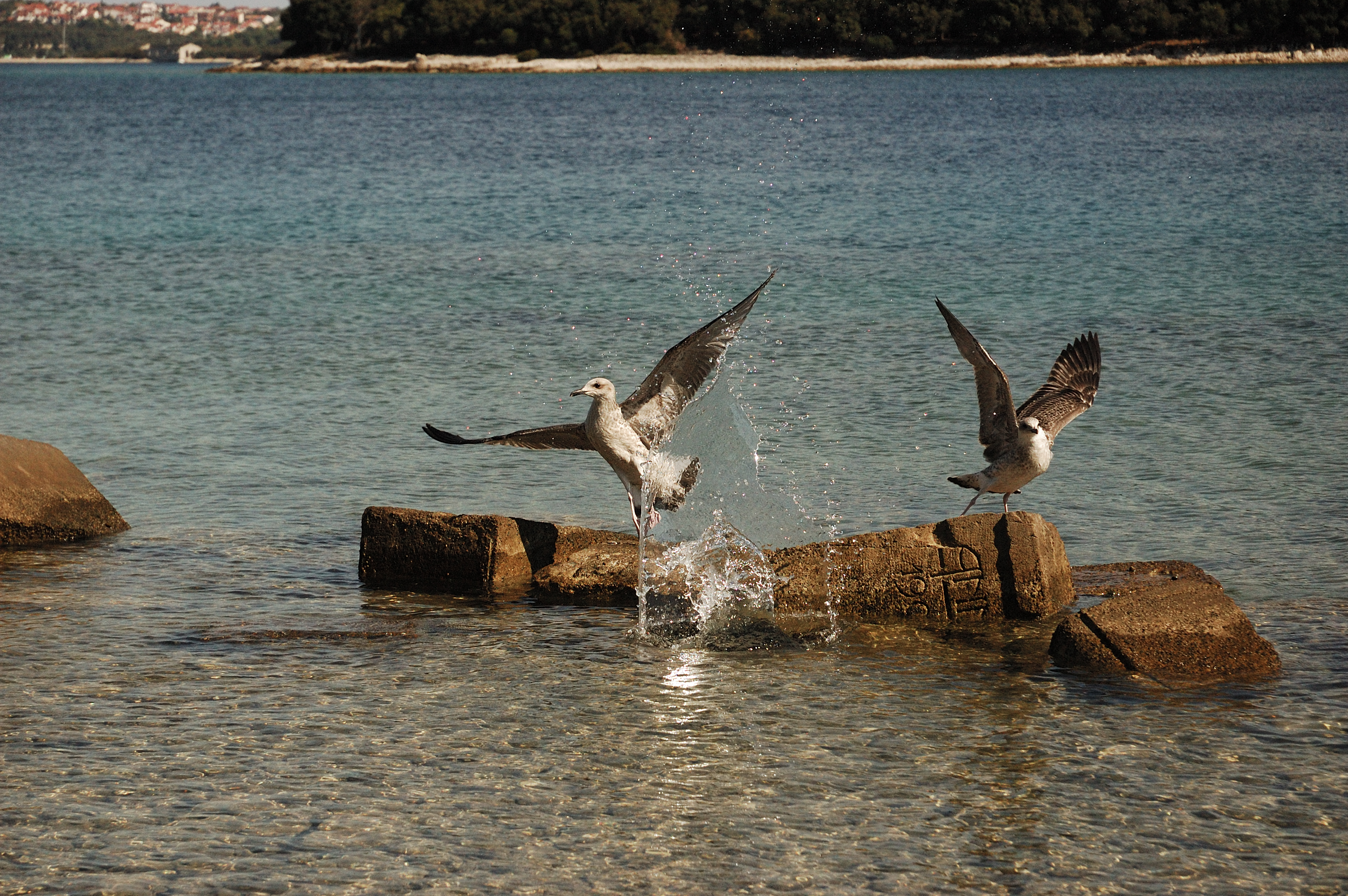

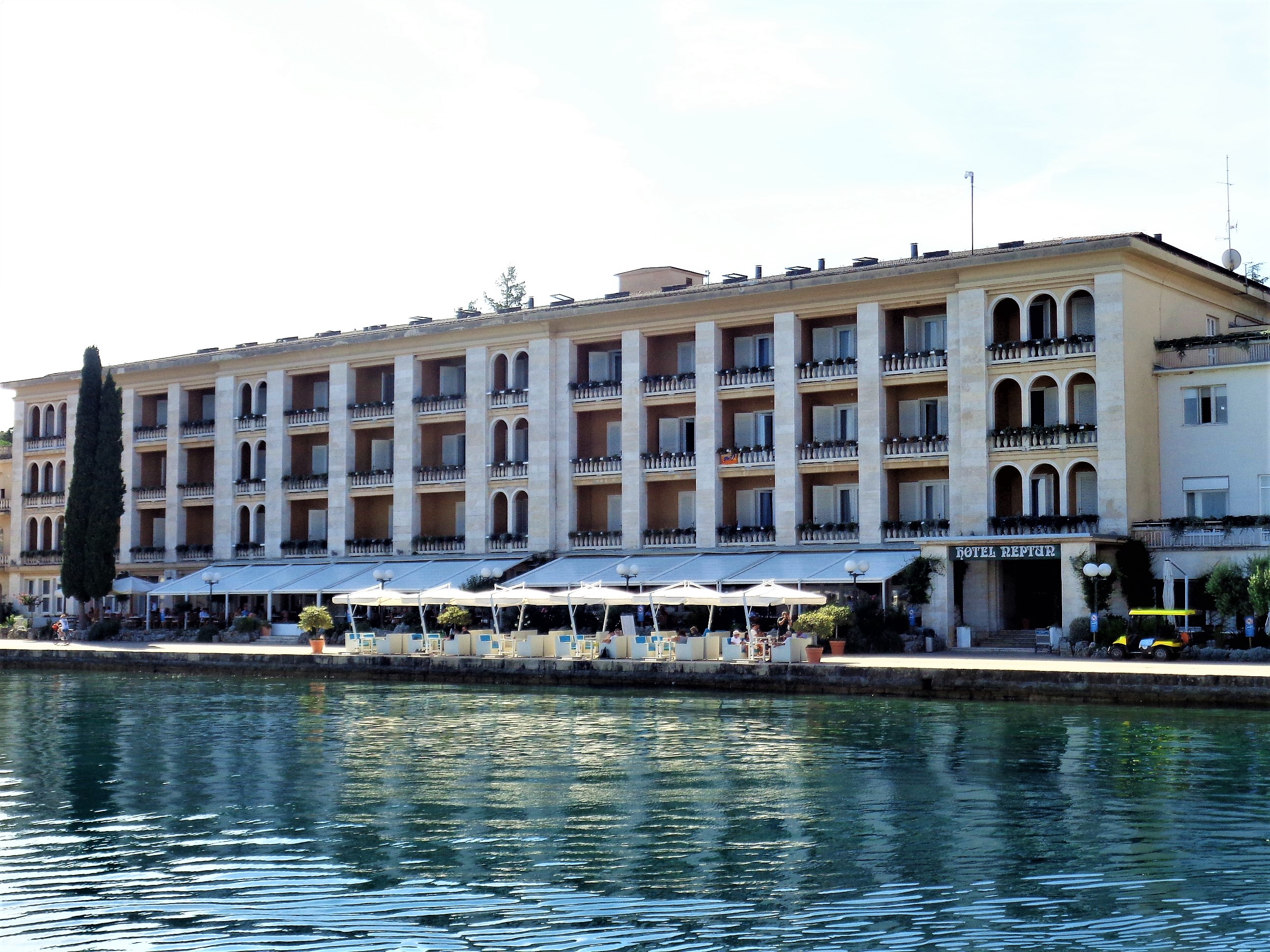
Neptun Hotel

On the Brijuni there are several archaeological and cultural sites.

At four sites on Veli Brijun Island over 200 dinosaur footprints have been discovered, which can be traced to the Cretaceous Period from where Brijuni Cretaceous Park gets its name.

The island encompasses several archeological sites. There is the 13th century AD St. Mary's Church which was built by the Knights Templar. There are also two ancient Roman villa remains, from the 2nd Century BC and remains of a Byzantine fort. The last remain is Hill-fort which indicates a Bronze Age settlement on the island dating back to 14th century BC.

The island houses an exhibition dedicated to Josip Broz Tito, showcasing photographs of more than a hundred state visits to the island. According to an analysis of reviews, many visitors find the exhibit anachronistic or even unsettling. The lower floor of the museum is dedicated to stuffed animals, derived from the island's zoo. There also is one room dedicated to Paul Kupelwieser. In the old boathouse was installed a fascinating museum about the other isles and nature, protect of envirinment and the old inhabitants, the isle-doctor of 1906 till 1938. By chance there are exhibitions about history and art in St. Rochus.

== See also ==
- Austrian Riviera
- Kornati
- List of protected areas of Croatia
