= Gaius Laecanius Bassus (consul 40) =

1st century AD Roman senator and consul

Gaius Laecanius Bassus was a senator and a politician of the Roman Empire, urban praetor in 32 AD then consul suffectus in 40 AD.

Originally from Pola or Fasana in Istria, where his family was settled since around 50 BC Bassus owned an important pottery workshop. He had a son, Gaius Laecanius Bassus, a Roman senator and consul. Bassus might have been the brother of a certain Laecania Bassa who was the first wife of Gaius Rubellius Blandus.

Based on an inscription, Attilio Degrassi made the assumption that Bassus was still alive in 64 during the consulship of his son.

Political offices
Preceded by Caligula III, sine collega	Roman consul AD 40 (suffect) with Quintus Terentius Culleo	Succeeded by Caligula IV, Gnaeus Sentius Saturninus
