= Mario Carlin =

Italian opera singer

Mario Carlin

Mario Carlin (13 June 1915 – 30 April 1984) was an Italian tenor.

He sang in the major theaters from the 1950s to the 1970s, featuring in various supporting roles and character tenor roles in major operas. He was among the first singers to appear on television in operas broadcast by RAI (Radiotelevisione Italiana) after World War II. After his career as a tenor, he dedicated himself to teaching singing.

== Biography ==
Mario Carlin in I quatro rusteghi, teatro alla Scala, Milan (photo with 1955 dedication)

Carlin was born in Fasana, Istria, on 13 June 1915. He was originally a fisherman in his native town, where he was called el nostro gardellin ("our goldfinch"). During World War II he moved to Pola and then to Trieste due to military service. He continued to study singing in Trieste with some fellow tenors, with whom he would share a great part of his career. Thanks to his firm will and great sacrifices he rose from his humble origins to fame, becoming a complete lyrical artist. He sang with "grace and elegance of accent". Carlin was gifted with a sweet tenoral voice. Perhaps his greatest quality was his "interpretative subtlety". He was sought after for roles that required "finesse of interpretation together with sure technical competence and perfect intonation" by some of the greatest Italian conductors of his day, such as Vittorio Gui and Alfredo Simonetto. He is remembered for, among others, his interpretations of Federico in L'arlesiana, Arlecchino in Pagliacci, Ping in Turandot, Cassio in Otello, Dancaïre in Carmen, Filipeto in I quatro rusteghi.

He was an estimator of his fellow countryman Antonio Smareglia, whom he considered quite underrated.

In the latter part of his life, he retired from his tenor career to dedicate himself to teach young aspiring tenors.
