= Rutilia gens =

Ancient Roman family

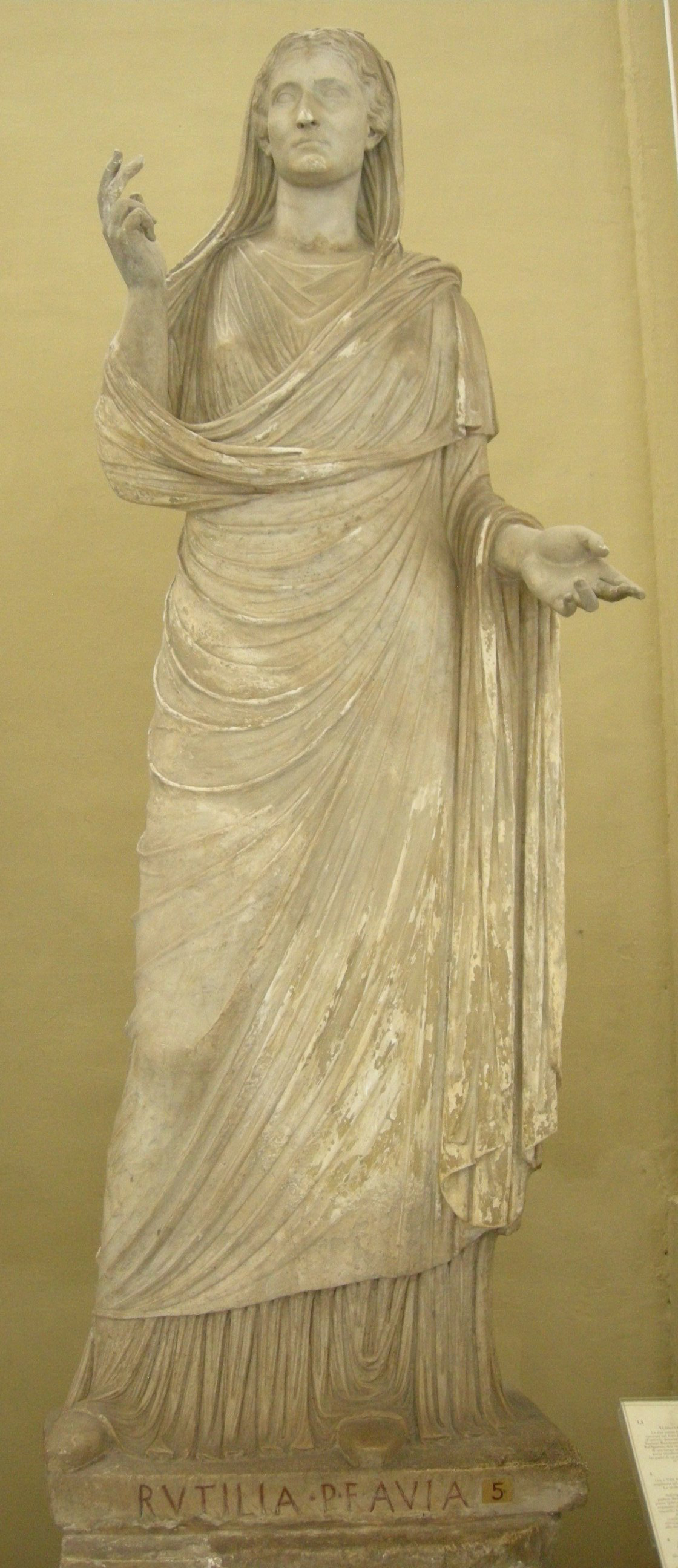
Statue of a woman from the gens Rutilia.

The gens Rutilia was a plebeian family at ancient Rome. Members of this gens appear in history beginning in the second century BC. The first to obtain the consulship was Publius Rutilius Rufus in 105 BC.

== Origin ==
The nomen Rutilius is derived from the Latin cognomen Rutilus, red or reddish, which was probably borne by an ancestor of the family who had red hair. The nomen belongs to a large class of gentilicia derived from other names using the suffix -ilius.

== Praenomina ==
The Rutilii used relatively few praenomina, chiefly Publius, Lucius, Marcus, and Gaius, all of which were among the most common names throughout Roman history. The only other praenomen found under the Republic was Quintus, known from Quintus Rutilius, quaestor in 44 BC.

== Branches and cognomina ==
The Rutilii of the Republic bore the cognomina Calvus, Lupus and Rufus. In addition to these, the coins of the Rutilii include the surname Flaccus, which does not occur in literary sources. Other cognomina occur in the imperial times. A number of Rutilii bore no surname. Rufus, red, was typically given to someone with red hair, and this choice of cognomen may have been influenced by the fact that the nomen Rutilius has the same meaning. Another of the surnames of the Rutilii, Calvus, indicated someone bald, while Lupus, a wolf, belongs to a common type of cognomen derived from familiar objects and animals. Flaccus indicated someone flabby, or with floppy ears.

== Members ==
This list includes abbreviated praenomina. For an explanation of this practice, see filiation.

- Spurius Rutilius Crassus, according to Livy, one of the consular tribunes in 417 BC, is probably a mistake for Spurius Veturius Crassus, named by Diodorus Siculus, since no other Rutilii are mentioned for over two and a half centuries.

=== Rutilii Rufi ===
- Publius Rutilius (Rufus?), tribune of the plebs in 169 BC, opposed the actions of the censors with regard to the publicani and one of his own clients, and brought them to trial, in retaliation for which they removed him from his tribe, and degraded him to the status of an aerarius.
- Publius Rutilius P. f. Rufus, had served as a military tribune under Scipio Aemilianus in Spain, praetor circa 118, and as consul in 105 took emergency measures to protect Rome following a series of military disasters in Gaul. He was falsely exiled for repetundae in 92. Rufus was an ally of Gaius Marius, granduncle of Caesar.
- Gaius Rutilius (P. f.) Rufus, a friend of Quintus Mucius Scaevola, was one of those who accused Manius Aquillius, the consul of 129 BC, of repetundae, or extortion in the government of his province.
- Rutilia P. f., wife of Marcus Aurelius Cotta, and later Lucius Aurelius Cotta. By Marcus, she was the mother of Gaius Aurelius Cotta, the orator. By Lucius, she was the mother of Aurelia, the mother of Caesar.
- Publius Rutilius Nudus, a legate serving under the consul Marcus Aurelius Cotta at Chalcedon in 74 BC. May have been the son of the consul of 105.
- Rutilia P. f., daughter of Publius Rutilius Nudus and the wife of Lucius Calpurnius Piso Caesoninus the consul of 58 BC.

=== Rutilii Lupi ===
- Publius Rutilius L. f. L. n. Lupus, consul in 90 BC, at the beginning of the Social War, appointed Marius as his legate, but through lack of experience led his men into an ambush, and was mortally wounded.
- Publius Rutilius (P. f. L. n.) Lupus, tribune of the plebs in 56 BC, proposed repealing Caesar's agrarian law. Praetor 49, at the beginning of the Civil War, he was a partisan of Pompeius, and stationed at Tarracina, but departed before Caesar's arrival, returning to Rome. In 48, Pompeius appointed him governor of Achaia.
- Publius Rutilius (P. f. P. n.) Lupus, a grammarian and rhetorician, active during the reign of Tiberius. He was the author of De Figuris Sententiarum et Elocutionis, a collection of translated passages from Greek authors, many of which are no longer extant in the original.
- Marcus Rutilius Lupus, prefect of Egypt from AD 113 to 117, during a revolt in Alexandria and Hermopolis.

=== Others ===
- Publius Rutilius Calvus, praetor in 166 BC, probably received the province of Hispania Ulterior. Some scholars identify him with the tribune degraded in 169, but Münzer suggests that the tribune was one of the Rutilii Rufi.
- Publius Rutilius M. f., tribune of the plebs in 136 BC, ordered Gaius Hostilius Mancinus to vacate his seat in the senate, on the grounds that his Roman citizenship had been revoked when the senate handed him over to the Numantines following his defeat the previous year.
- Rutilius, one of Sulla's officers, whom he sent to Gaius Flavius Fimbria in 84 BC.
- Gaius Rutilius, mentioned by Cicero as one who had been accused by a certain Gaius Rucius, should perhaps be read Hirtilius.
- Lucius Rutilius Flaccus, triumvir monetalis around 75 BC, and a senator in 72.
- Publius Rutilius, a witness named by Cicero in support of Aulus Caecina, whom he defended in his oration, Pro Caecina, in 69 BC.
- Marcus Rutilius, placed in charge of distributing land to Caesar's soldiers in 45 BC.
- Quintus Rutilius, quaestor urbanus in 44 BC.
- Gaius Rutilius Secundus, equestrian governor of Mauretania Tingitana from AD 48 to 53.
- Gaius Rutilius Gallicus, praefectus urbi during the reign of Domitian.
- Rutilius Geminus, author of a tragedy entitled Astyanax. Fulgentius connects him with the Libri Pontificales.
- Rutilius Maximus, a jurist, and the author of Ad Legem Falcidiam, a treatise on a law enacted in 40 BC by Publius Falcidius, tribune of the plebs, requiring that the heir of an estate had to take at least one quarter of the property in question.
- Claudius Rutilius Numatianus, praefectus urbi circa AD 413 or 414, was a native of Gaul, and the author of an elegy known as the Itinerarium, or De Reditu, in two books, composed about 417. He was a pagan, and his writing shows some hostility to Jewish and Christian practices.
- Rutilius Taurus Aemilianus Palladius, the author of De Re Rustica, a treatise on agriculture, perhaps dating to the fifth century.

== See also ==
- List of Roman gentes

== Bibliography ==
- Marcus Tullius Cicero, Brutus, De Oratore, Divinatio in Quintum Caecilium, Epistulae ad Atticum, Epistulae ad Familiares, Epistulae ad Quintum Fratrem, Pro Balbo, Pro Caecina, Pro Fonteio.
- Gaius Julius Caesar, Commentarii de Bello Civili (Commentaries on the Civil War).
- Diodorus Siculus, Bibliotheca Historica (Library of History).
- Titus Livius (Livy), History of Rome.
- Publius Ovidius Naso (Ovid), Epistulae ex Ponto (Letters from Pontus).
- Marcus Velleius Paterculus, Compendium of Roman History.
- Valerius Maximus, Factorum ac Dictorum Memorabilium (Memorable Facts and Sayings).
- Lucius Annaeus Seneca (Seneca the Younger), De Beneficiis (On Kindness), De Consolatione Ad Helviam (To Helvia, on Consolation).
- Gaius Plinius Secundus (Pliny the Elder), Historia Naturalis (Natural History).
- Publius Papinius Statius, Silvae.
- Decimus Junius Juvenalis, Satirae (Satires).
- Flavius Josephus, Antiquitates Judaïcae (Antiquities of the Jews).
- Gaius Suetonius Tranquillus, De Illustribus Grammaticis (On the Illustrious Grammarians).
- Lucius Annaeus Florus, Epitome de T. Livio Bellorum Omnium Annorum DCC (Epitome of Livy: All the Wars of Seven Hundred Years).
- Appianus Alexandrinus (Appian), Bella Mithridatica (The Mithridatic Wars), Bellum Civile (The Civil War).
- Julius Obsequens, Liber de Prodigiis (The Book of Prodigies).
- Paulus Orosius, Historiarum Adversum Paganos (History Against the Pagans).
- Fabius Planciades Fulgentius, Expositio Sermonum Antiquorum (Explanation of Ancient Words).
- Digesta, or Pandectae (The Digest).
- Johann Christian Wernsdorf, Poëtae Latini Minores (Minor Latin Poets), Altenburg, Helmstedt (1780–1799).
- Friedrich Heinrich Bothe, Poëtae Scenici Latinorum Fragmenta (Fragments of the Latin Theatrical Poets), Heinrich Vogler, Halberstadt (1822).
- Dictionary of Greek and Roman Biography and Mythology, William Smith, ed., Little, Brown and Company, Boston (1849).
- George Davis Chase, "The Origin of Roman Praenomina", in Harvard Studies in Classical Philology, vol. VIII, pp. 103–184 (1897).
- T. Robert S. Broughton, The Magistrates of the Roman Republic, American Philological Association (1952–1986).
- J.E.H. Spaul, "Governors of Tingitana", in Antiquités Africaines, vol. 30 (1994).
- Anthony James Boyle, An Introduction to Roman Tragedy, Routledge (2006).
