= Lucius Annius Bassus =

1st century Roman senator and governor

Lucius Annius Bassus was a Roman senator of the early Roman Empire, whose known career flourished under the reign of Vespasian. He was suffect consul in the nundinium of November to December AD 70 as the colleague of Gaius Laecanius Bassus Caecina Paetus.

The earliest historical mention of Bassus is from an inscription from Kourion in Cyprus, where he was governor; this inscription, which can be dated between 22 August 65 and 22 August 66, attests to the erection of a statue to Emperor Nero during the tenure of Bassus. His next appearance is in Tacitus, who tells us that Bassus was commander of the Legio XI Claudia, stationed in Dalmatia. Tacitus states that Bassus manipulated the complaisant governor of Dalmatia, Marcus Pompeius Silvanus Staberius Flavianus, into supporting Vespasian at a crucial moment.

Bassus may have lived into the first decade of the second century AD. Pliny the Younger, in a letter recommending Claudius Pollio to his friend Gaius Julius Cornutus Tertullus, mentions that Pollio had written a favorable biography of the recently deceased Bassus, "a noble gesture deserving of praise, since it is so unusual, for many invoke the memory of the dead only to grumble about them."

Political offices
Preceded by Quintus Julius Cordinus Gaius Rutilius Gallicus, and ignotus as Suffect consuls	Suffect consul of the Roman Empire; 70 with Gaius Laecanius Bassus Caecina Paetus	Succeeded by Vespasian III, and Marcus Cocceius Nerva as Ordinary consuls
