= Arrecina Tertulla =

1st century AD wife of Roman emperor Titus

- ARRECINA TERTVLLA
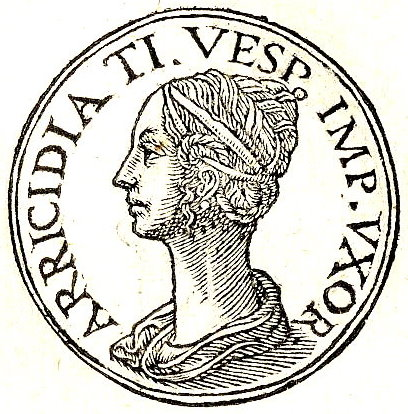
- Arrecina Tertulla from Guillaume Rouillé's Promptuarii Iconum Insigniorum
- Known for: first wife of Titus
- Spouse: Titus
- Children: Julia Flavia
- Parents: Marcus Arrecinus Clemens (father); Julia Ursa (mother)

Arrecina Tertulla was a Roman woman who lived in the 1st century CE. She was the first wife of Titus and possibly the mother of his daughter Julia Flavia.

== Biography ==
=== Early life ===
Tertulla came from an Equestrian-rank family of obscure origin. Her mother was Julia Ursa and her father was Marcus Arrecinus Clemens, who served as Emperor Caligula's praetorian prefect in 38 A.D. Tertulla's brother Marcus Arrecinus Clemens also served as a praetorian prefect in 70 under the Emperor Vespasian.

Her name "Tertulla", is a nickname for the female cognomen Tertia.

=== Marriage ===
In 63 CE, Tertulla married Vespasian's first son, the future Emperor Titus. This marriage could have been arranged by the fathers of Tertulla and Titus, to promote Titus' political and military career, and to provide financial relief from the debt incurred by Vespasian's proconsulship. She may have born Titus his first child, Julia Flavia, though there is some disagreement over whether Julia Flavia was the daughter of Tertulla, or if Titus' second wife. The marriage did not last long, as Tertulla was either divorced or dead by 63, when Titus married for the second time to Marcia Furnilla.

== Sources ==
- Suetonius, The Twelve Caesars - Titus
- Donahue, John. "Titus Flavius Vespasianus (A.D. 79-81)". De Imperatoribus Romanis: An Online Encyclopedia of Roman Rulers and Their Families. Archived from the original on 15 May 2008.
- "Titus Flavius Sabinus Vespasianus (AD 40 - 81)". Illustrated History of the Roman Empire. Archived from the original on 11 May 2008.
- Wend, David A. (1999) [1995]. "TITUS: Darling of the Human Race?". Archived from the original on 2009-10-19.
