= Gaius Laecanius Bassus Caecina Paetus =

1st century AD Roman senator, consul and governor

Gaius Laecanius Bassus Caecina Paetus was a Roman senator of the early Roman Empire, whose known career flourished under the reign of Vespasian. He was suffect consul in the nundinium of November to December AD 70 as the colleague of Lucius Annius Bassus.

His full, polyonymous name is known from a votive inscription from Minturnae set up by a slave named "Theseus". The nomenclature of his name has led scholars to agree that Caecina Paetus was the son of Aulus Caecina Paetus, consul of 37, and that he was adopted by Gaius Laecanius Bassus, consul of 64, between his consulate and his governorship.

Caecina Paetus is attested as consular governor of Roman Asia in 80/81. He also served on the board that managed the water supply of Rome around this time.

He is thought to be the father of Gaius Laecanius Bassus Caecina Flaccus, known from an inscription found at Brundisium. Flaccus died young, aged eighteen.

== See also ==
- Laecania gens
- Caecinia gens

Political offices
| Preceded by Quintus Julius Cordinus Gaius Rutilius Gallicus, and ignotus as Suffect consuls | Suffect consul of the Roman Empire; 70 with Lucius Annius Bassus | Succeeded by Vespasian III, and Marcus Cocceius Nerva as Ordinary consuls |
