= Valbandon =

- Village
- Location within Croatia
- Coordinates: 44°55′08″N 13°48′49″E
- Country: Croatia
- County: Istria
- Municipality: Fažana

Area
  - Total: 3.8 km^{2} (1.5 sq mi)

Population (2021)
  - Total: 1,675
  - Density: 440/km^{2} (1,100/sq mi)
- Time zone: UTC+1 (CET)
  - Summer (DST): UTC+2 (CEST)
- Postal code: 52212
- Area code: 52

Valbandon is a village in the municipality of Fažana, in Istria County, Croatia.

== Demographics ==
According to the 2021 census, its population was 1,675. In 2011 it had a population of 1,626.
