= Lecanius Areius =

1st century Greek physician

- Λεκάνιος Ἄρειος
- Occupation: Physician
- Era: 1st century CE
- Known for: Medical formulas cited by Andromachus; quoted by Galen; addressed by Pedanius Dioscorides

Lecanius Areius (Ancient Greek: Λεκάνιος Ἄρειος) was a Greek physician who probably lived in or before the first century CE, as one of his medical formulae is quoted by the Roman court physician Andromachus, work wrote in the 1st century.

Lecanius Areius may perhaps be the same person who is several times quoted by Galen, and who is sometimes called a "follower of Asclepius" (Ἀσκληπιάδειος), sometimes a native of Tarsus in Cilicia, and sometimes mentioned without any distinguishing epithet at all.

He may perhaps also be the person who is said by the medical writer Soranus of Ephesus to have written on the life of Hippocrates, and to whom Pedanius Dioscorides addressed his work De Materia Medica.

Whether any or all of these passages refer to the same individual, it is impossible to say for certain, but there are no known chronological or other difficulties that would make this assumption impossible.

== See also ==
- Laecania gens
