= Areios of Paiania =

Areios of Paiania (Ἄρειος ὁ Παιανιεύς) was the eponymous archon of Athens at some point between 27 and 18 BC, most probably in 19 BC. He is known from an inscription that comes from the building on the Acropolis of Athens known as the Temple of Roma and Augustus.

Areios was a member of the Amynandridai, and in the same year that he was archon, he commissioned an inscription listing the members of that genos which was displayed in the temple of Cecrops on the Acropolis.

Areois was the son of a Dorion of Paiania. His wife, Herma, was the daughter of a Gorgios of Melite, and an unmarried daughter, Gorgias, is known from a tombstone.

== Works cited ==
- Morales, Fabio Augusto (2017). "The Monument of Roma and Augustus on the Athenian Acropolis: Imperial Identities and Local Traditions". In Vanacker, Wouter; Zuiderhoek, Arjan (eds.). Imperial Identities in the Roman World. London: Routledge.
- Schmalz, Geoffrey C.R. (2009). Augustan and Julio-Claudian Athens: A New Epigraphy and Prosopography. Leiden: Brill.
