= Arrius Varus =

Roman soldier

Arrius Varus was a Roman soldier who rose to prominence during the Year of the Four Emperors (AD 69) as a supporter of Vespasian. Varus managed to hold two of the most senior equestrian posts, praetorian prefect and praefectus annonae. What is known about him comes from the writings of the Roman historian Tacitus, who describes him as "an energetic soldier".

Varus first appears in the historical record as a commander of a cohors in Corbulo's army, when during the latter's campaign on the Eastern frontier Varus was assigned to escort some Armenian hostages. This incidental mention by Tacitus assumes significance when the historian introduces Varus in the Histories, where he tells us he provided damaging information about Corbulo to the emperor Nero in exchange for his promotion to primus pilus. Based on a later comment of Tacitus, that Legio III Gallica was loyal to Varus, he was commissioned to that unit in AD 69.

By July of that year, the troops in the Balkan provinces had heard that Vespasian had proclaimed himself emperor, in opposition to Vitellius. Legio III Gallica and the other legion stationed in Moesia, Legio VII Claudia, responded by declaring for Vespasian. In late August, a number of delegates from the Pannonian legions met at Poetovio, where Marcus Antonius Primus, legatus legionis of Legio VII Galbiana, convinced these legions to also support Vespasian. Although Vespasian, wishing to avoid bloodshed, had recommended that they wait on his further instructions, Primus, supported by Cornelius Fuscus, the procurator of Illyricum, advocated for immediate action. Primus, by then joined by Arrius Varus, took only the auxilia cavalry and light infantry and swept over the Julian Alps, and occupied Aquileia.

Once the five Balkan legions had reached him, Primus boldly marched upon the main Vitellian army at Cremona; Arrius Varus, his second-in-command, led the 4,000 cavalrymen. In the ensuing Second Battle of Bedriacum, Varus opened the battle with an impetuous attack on the lead elements; although initially successful, as increasing numbers of Vitellian reinforcements entered the battle, Varus panicked. Primus had arranged the infantry to leave a gap for Varus to withdraw through; instead Varus led his fleeing cavalry plunged into the ranks of his fellow soldiers, increasing the panic of his troops. Only through the heroism of Antonius Primus, who slew a fleeing standard bearer and seized the standard, and used it to rally some troopers to make a stand where a wooden bridge crossed a stream was the situation not only saved, but the battle won.

In the events that follow, Varus is conspicuous by his absence. He played no part in helping Antonius Primus handle the mutiny that followed the battle, nor in maintaining order amongst the soldiers following the sack of Cremona. He only appeared later, during the advance on Rome, when he was dispatched with a detachment to capture Interamna. The garrison of 400 cavalrymen made a half-hearted stand; after a few were killed, the rest threw down their weapons and surrendered. According to Tacitus, the loss of Interamna weakened the already deteriorating morale of the Vitellians.

No details are known about what Varus did immediately after arriving in Rome on 20 December. By the time Gaius Licinius Mucianus, Vespasian's chief supporter, arrived in the capital city a few weeks later, both Varus and his superior Primus had secured themselves in positions of power. Tacitus notes that although Varus had the title of Praetorian Prefect, "the supreme power was in the hands of Primus Antoninus." How Varus arrived at this appointment is unclear. Domitian, Vespasian's younger son, had assumed "the title and residence of Caesar", but Tacitus does not explicitly state he appointed Varus to this important equestrian post, although he notes Domitian favored Varus. Gwyn Morgan suggests that Varus was "perhaps self-appointed". Further, the troops they had led against Vitellius were encamped around the city.

Nevertheless, Mucianus demonstrated his skill in politics at this point. Tacitus describes the process in detail. First, the fact that Mucianus was Vespasian's representative undercut their authority in itself; Morgan notes Mucianus had a signet ring Vespasian gave him for that purpose. It helped that Primus was preoccupied with looting the imperial palace, and Varus with rebuilding the Praetorian Guard, whose numbers had been depleted following the capture of Rome. Next, Mucianus negotiated with the two men, both praising them in the Senate and making promises of bigger rewards when Vespasian arrived in Rome. Lulled by these words, neither man suspected anything when Mucianus ordered their two primary bases of support to leave Rome: Legio VII Galbiana marched off to the Rhine frontier to deal with unrest there, while Legio III Gallica returned to Syria, which had been its home before being stationed in Moesia. Lastly, Mucianus transferred Varus from prefecture of the guard to that over the annona.

Henriette Pavis d'Escurac notes that this was actually a demotion; it is possible Varus' command of the Guard was, as Morgan suggests, self-appointed, and better a secure title than a tenuous one. Tactius' History breaks off before the end of the year 70, so uncertainty clouds the rest of Arrius Varus' life. Morgan suggests, "Varus would fall from grace, but it looks as if he was brought down by score settling on the part of the daughter of Corbulo, the general he had traduced in Nero's reign."
