= Gaius Laecanius Bassus =

1st century AD Roman senator and consul

Gaius Laecanius Bassus was a Roman senator, who was active during the Principate. He was consul ordinarius for the year 64 AD with Marcus Licinius Crassus Frugi as his colleague.

Originally from Pola or Fasana in Istria, where his family owned important pottery works, Bassus was the son of Gaius Laecanus Bassus, suffect consul in 40. Based on the name of Gaius Laecanius Bassus Caecina Paetus, experts surmise that Laecanius Bassus adopted Paetus, consul suffect in 70, who was the biological son of Aulus Caecina Paetus, suffect consul in 37. This was likely a testamentary adoption, where Paetus added Bassus' name to his own in return for a bequest, for there is evidence that the younger man frequently used the name he received at birth. The name of a second man, Gaius Lecanius Bassus Paccius Paelignus, governor of Creta et Cyrenaica, has led some authorities to suggest he may have also been adopted by Laecanius Bassus.

Political offices
Preceded by Titus Petronius Niger, and Quintus Manlius Tarquitius Saturninus as suffect consuls	Consul of the Roman Empire; 64 with Marcus Licinius Crassus Frugi	Succeeded by Gaius Licinius Mucianus, and Quintus Fabius Barbarus Antonius Macer as suffect consuls
