= Fažana =

- Municipality
- Općina Fažana; Comune di Fasana; Fažana Municipality

- Flag Coat of arms

- Location of Fažana municipality in Istria
- Interactive map of Fažana
- Location within Croatia
- Coordinates: 44°56′N 13°48′E
- Country: Croatia
- County: Istria County

Government
  - Mayor: Ada Damjanac

Area
  - Municipality: 13.6 km^{2} (5.3 sq mi)
  - Urban: 9.9 km^{2} (3.8 sq mi)

Population (2021)
  - Municipality: 3,463
  - Density: 255/km^{2} (659/sq mi)
  - Urban: 1,788
  - Urban density: 180/km^{2} (470/sq mi)
- Time zone: UTC+1 (CET)
  - Summer (DST): UTC+2 (CEST)
- Postal code: 52215 Vodnjan
- Area code: 052
- Website: fazana.hr

Fažana (Croatian; pronounced [faʒǎna]) or Fasana (Italian; pronounced [faˈzaːna]) is a village and a municipality on the southwestern coast of Istria in Croatia. It is a fishing village.

== Name ==
Fažana, which in Roman times carried the name of Vasianum and then Phasiana, derives its name from the presence in Roman times of ceramic and terracotta manufactures such as vases, tiles and amphorae. Its name and meaning thereof is also reflected in the coat of arms of the town, an amphora.

== History ==
Historical affiliations

- Roman Republic (177–27 BCE) (Note: Though Istria, including the area of Fažana, was previously inhabited by the Histri, the settlement of Fažana itself was founded by the Romans)
- Roman Empire (27 BCE – 476)
- Odoacer's Kingdom of Italy (476–493)
- Ostrogothic Kingdom (493–538)
- Byzantine Empire (540–751)
- Frankish Kingdom (Carolingian Empire) (788–812) (Note: With the 812 Pax Nicephori Istria passed to the Franks except for its coastal cities, which, along with Venice, remained under Byzantine influence. The parts of Istria that passed to the Franks became part of the Imperial Kingdom of Italy as the March of Istria, which from 952 to 1070 was part of the March of Verona)
- Republic of Venice (1148–1797)
- Holy Roman Empire (1797–1803)
- Napoleonic Italy (1803–1809) (Note: In 1803 Istria was occupied by the French Army and in 1805 it became part of the Napoleonic Kingdom of Italy)
- Illyrian Provinces (1809–1814)
- Austrian Empire (1814–1918)
- Kingdom of Italy (1918–1945) (Note: From 1943 to 1945 part of the Operational Zone of the Adriatic Littoral, nominally under the Italian Social Republic, de facto part of Nazi Germany)
- SFR Yugoslavia (SR Croatia) (1947–1991)
- Croatia (1991–present)

=== Roman times ===
Fažana is a village of Roman origin. Its territory was part of the Roman Empire by 177 BC. It belonged to the Roman colony of Pula, both politically and administratively. During Roman times, Fažana was an important economic center of the Ancient Roman civilization. Its importance during Roman times was due to its manufactures, production of olive oil and later amphorae. The Ancient Roman factory of Fasana, located in the old center of the town, was noted for its production of ceramics and bricks. The production of amphorae started during the latter part of the reign of Augustus, and lasted until the second century AD. In these amphorae were stored the local products, such as grain, salted fish and, most importantly, the Istrian oil and wine, the two most valuable products of the Istrian peninsula during Roman times. The workshop belonged to the local Lecanii family, and its first known owner was praetor urbanus Caius (Gaius) Laecanius Bassus. A striking aspect of the recovered amphorae are the signatures of the workers who worked in the factory.

Its proximity to the sea made fishing an important feature of the town already in Roman times. It was a safe heaven, where Roman mercantile ships could dock, and where it was possible to live, work, and go on vacation. Its importance as a patrician holiday town is shown by the finding of many Roman villas in the area. Among them is the so-called Roman Villa of Valbandon, located at 2 kilometers from the center of Fažana. It is a residential complex divided into two groups of buildings. Discovered at the beginning of the 20th century, it features beautiful floors with floral and geometric patterns.

=== Middle Ages ===
In the 6th century AD, the Church of Sant'Eliseo was built in Fažana over the foundations of a palace from the Later Roman Empire period. The Later Roman Empire palace, built a century earlier, had been used as a vacation house. The small Church of the Santa Maria del Carmelo was built in the 14th century. It features frescoes from the 15th century.

Also in the 15th century was built by the sea the Church of Santi Cosma e Damiano. It is characterized by Gothic elements and features a 27-meter tall bell tower and Renaissance paintings from the 16th century, including Giorgio Ventura's Ultima Cena from 1598.

== Geography ==
The city is located by the sea, 8 kilometers (5 mi) northwest of Pula. Just before it lie the islands of Brijuni.

The territory of Fažana includes, beside the fishing village, the Ronzi valley to the south, the coast of Peroj in the north, and the town's hinterland, consisting of olive groves and vineyards. The town's importance during Roman times was due precisely to its production of olive oil.

== Demographics ==
In 2021, the municipality had 3,463 residents in the following settlements:

- Fažana, population 1,788
- Valbandon, population 1,675
Fažana: Population trends 1857–2021
v

population	413	508	525	637	994	1452	1410	1408	799	765	1271	1538	1879	2716	3050	3635	3463
	1857	1869	1880	1890	1900	1910	1921	1931	1948	1953	1961	1971	1981	1991	2001	2011	2021

Sources: Croatian Bureau of Statistics publications

=== Languages ===
Although though the Government of the Republic of Croatia does not guarantee official Croatian-Italian bilingualism, the statute of Fažana/Fasana itself does. Preserving traditional Italian place names and assigning street names to Italian historical figures is legally mandated and carried out.

== Notable people ==
- Gaius Laecanius Bassus (fl. 32–40 AD), Roman praetor urbanus and consul
- Gaius Laecanius Bassus (fl. 64 AD), Roman consul
- Mario Carlin (1915–1984), Italian tenor
- Pasqualino Gobbi (fl. late 17th century – early 18th century), Roman Catholic cleric and author
