= Egypt–India relations =

- Egypt: India

Diplomatic mission
- Embassy of Egypt, New Delhi: Embassy of India, Cairo

Envoy
- Ambassador Kamel Zayed Galal: Ambassador Shri Suresh K. Reddy

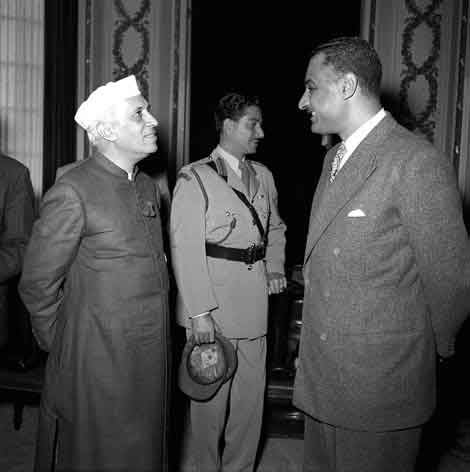
President of Egypt Gamal Abdel Nasser receiving the Indian Prime Minister Jawaharlal Nehru, c. February 1955

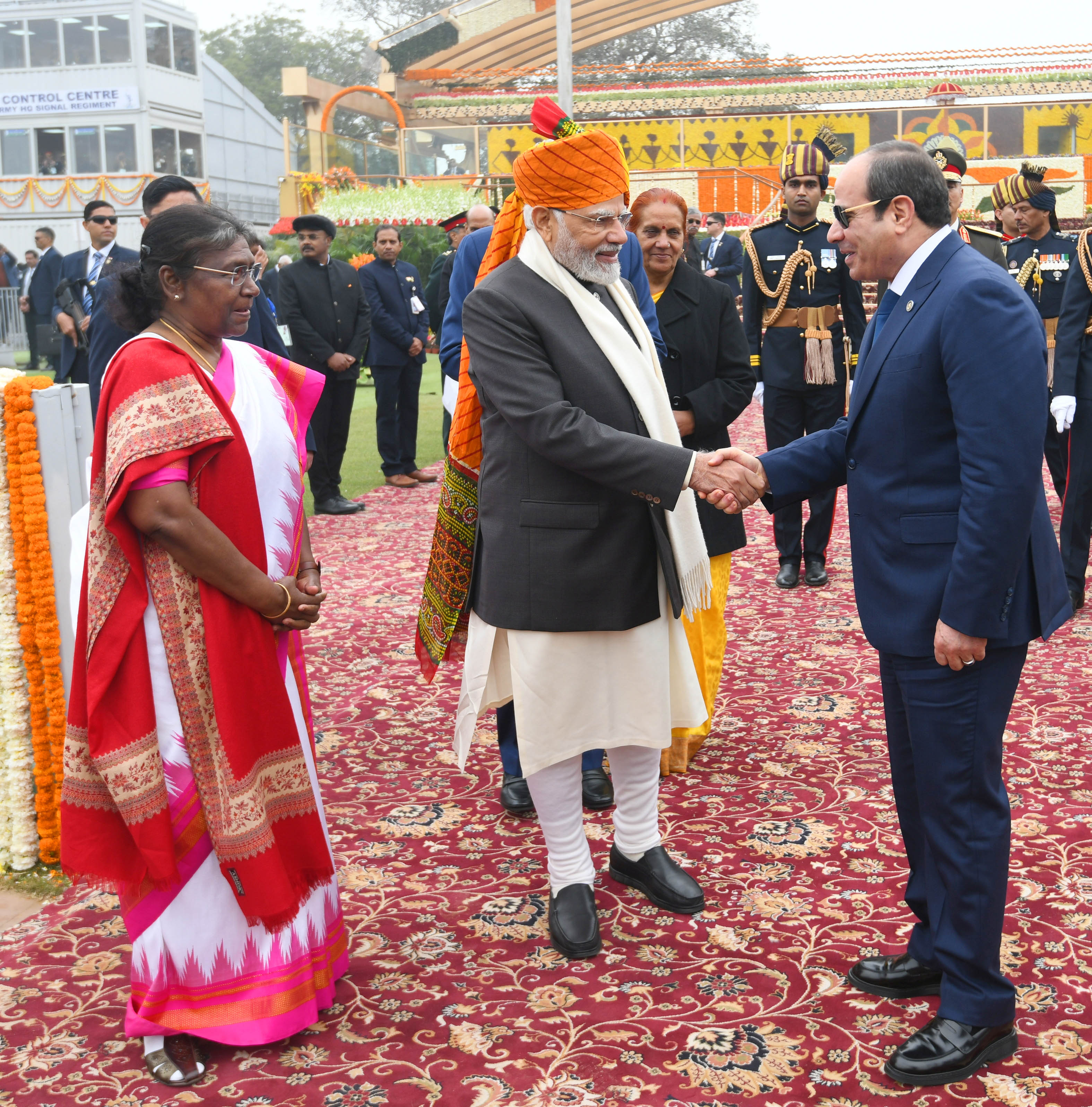
President of Egypt Abdel Fattah el-Sisi being welcomed by PM Narendra Modi and President Droupadi Murmu

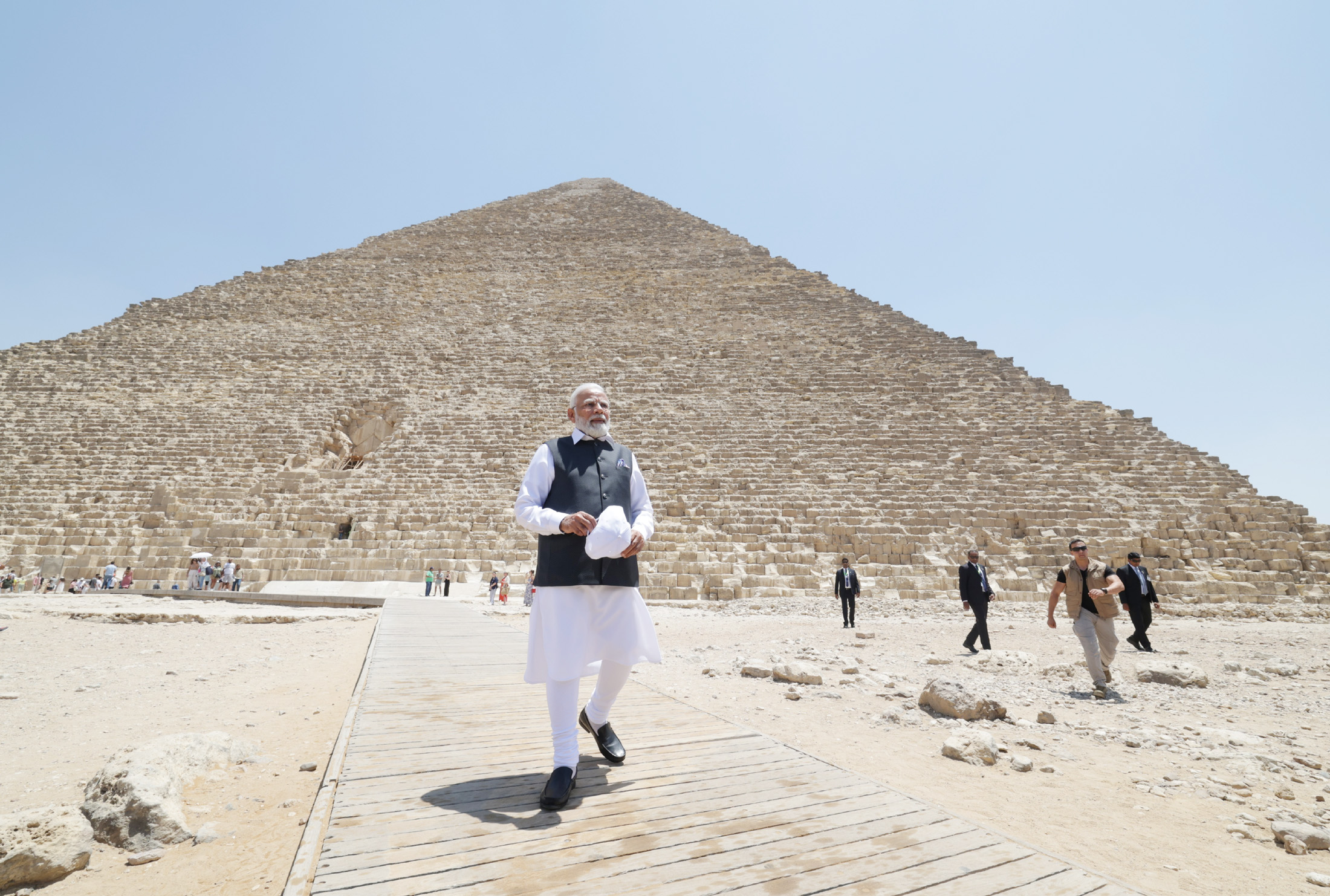
Prime Minister Narendra Modi visits the Great Pyramid of Giza during his visit to Egypt on June 25, 2023.

Egypt–India relations are bilateral relations between Egypt and India. Modern Egypt–India relations go back to the contacts between Saad Zaghloul and Mahatma Gandhi on the common goals of their respective movements of independence. In 1955, Egypt, under Gamal Abdel Nasser and India under Jawaharlal Nehru, became the founders of the Non-Aligned Movement. During the 1956 War, Nehru stood supporting Egypt to the point of threatening to withdraw his country from the British Commonwealth. In 1967, following the Six-Day War, India supported Egypt and the Arabs. In 1977, New Delhi described the visit of President Anwar al-Sadat to Jerusalem as a "brave" move and considered the peace treaty between Egypt and Israel a primary step on the path of a just settlement of the Middle East problem. Major Egyptian exports to India include raw cotton, raw and manufactured fertilizers, oil and oil products, organic and non-organic chemicals, leather and iron products. Major imports into Egypt from India are cotton yarn, sesame, coffee, herbs, tobacco and lentils. The Egyptian Ministry of Petroleum is also currently negotiating the establishment of a natural gas-operated fertilizer plant with another Indian company. In 2004 the Gas Authority of India Limited, bought 15% of Egypt Nat Gas distribution and marketing company.

President Mubarak of Egypt visited India in 2008. During the visit he met Prime Minister Manmohan Singh.

Egypt's President Mohamed Morsi visited India from 18 to 21 March 2013 as the head of a high-level delegation of ministers and business leaders, at a time when trade between the two sides has witnessed a record 30% jump.

Egypt's President Abdel Fattah El-Sisi was honored as the Chief Guest for India's 2023 Republic Day Parade celebrations. Representing the main branches of the Egyptian armed forces, 144 soldiers participated in India's 74th Republic Day parade.

== History ==
=== Ancient relations ===
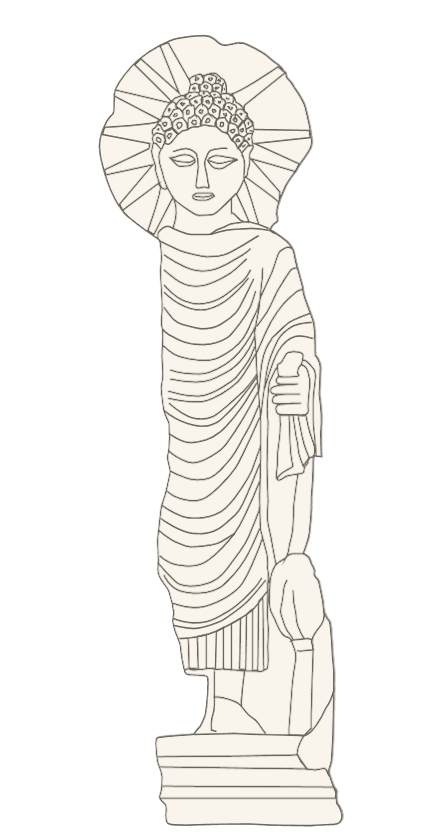
The Berenike Buddha, discovered in Berenice Troglodytica in 2022.

Indians had already been trading with Egypt for a long time even before the conquest of Egypt by the Romans. At the end of 1st century BCE Indian products reached the Romans during the rule of Augustus, and the Roman historian Strabo mentions an increase in Roman trade with India following the Roman annexation of Egypt. Recent excavations at Berenike in Egypt have confirmed, there was a small community of Indian Buddhists at Alexandria, the greatest of all Roman ports. A large number of significant finds have been made providing evidence of the cargo from the Malabar Coast and the presence of Tamil people from South India and Jaffna being at this last outpost of the Roman Empire.

=== Modern era ===
The 1869 completion of the Suez Canal led to faster transport between the United Kingdom and India, and led into British intervention in Egypt.

== Modern economic relations ==
India is the fourth largest trade partner of Egypt, after the US, Italy and Saudi Arabia.

=== Oil ===
In 2003, Indian giant Reliance signed a contract with the Egyptian General Petroleum Corporation (EGPC) to import 8 shipments of crude oil in 2003. Two years preceding the contract, they had imported shipments from Egypt. In August 2004, the Indian company GAIL procured 15% of the Egyptian Company Nat Gas which deals with marketing and distributing natural gas in Egypt.

Egyptian and Indian ministers of petroleum met in 2004 in Egypt to discuss the prospect of investment and purchase of oil and gas from Egypt.

=== Power ===
In 2008, India's KEC International Limited, received its largest order worth ₹636 crore (US$68 million) from Egyptian Electricity Transmission Company. The order was funded through the European Investment Bank and the Egyptian National Bank. The order included design, supply and construction of power transmission towers and laying of 196 kilometres of transmission lines in Egypt. It was completed on a turnkey basis within a period 24 months. This, however, was not the first time. KEC International has been laying power transmission lines in Egypt for more than 40 years. Recently, KEC International was engaged in a ₹60 crore (US$6.4 million) contract for supply of overhead transmission towers for the Egypt–Jordan Transmission Line.

=== Investments ===
In 2011, Egyptian investment in India was at about US$30 million. El Sewedy Group, an Egyptian company, manufactures electric metres in India. Another Egyptian company, Orascom Telecom, used to have 10% stake in the then Hutchinson-Essar which has since been bought by Vodafone

The current Indian investment in Egypt stands at US$2.5 billion in about 45 projects. Alexandria Carbon Black, the Alexandria Fibre Co, Dabur India's production facility for its cosmetics line, Niletex, Auto Tech Engineering, Marico's acquisition of two hair care brands and the Sanmar Group's acquisition of a unit of Trust Chemicals of Egypt represent some of the main Indian investments in Egypt. GAIL has equity and management stake in two gas distribution ventures in Fayoum and Cairo as well as in Natgas. In April 2007, OVL and its partner IPR Red Sea Inc announced a significant oil field discovery in the North Ramadan Concession in the Gulf of Suez and reported a second discovery in November 2008, though these deposits were later found to be commercially unviable. In March 2008, Gujarat State Petroleum Corporation Ltd (GSPC) signed a Concession Agreement for two oil and gas exploration blocks in Egypt. (The two exploration blocks are North Hap'y and South Diyur. N Hap'y is an offshore block located in the Mediterranean Sea and S Diyur is an onshore block located in the Western Desert). GSPC subsequently acquired three more exploration blocks in the Red Sea region in 2010. Satyam Computers and Wipro have set up global delivery centres in Cairo. The Oberoi Group has been managing a hotel and Nile cruises; Kirloskar Brothers assemble diesel engines and irrigation pump sets in Egypt; Ranbaxy has an Egyptian subsidiary for manufacturing pharmaceutical formulations; Ashok Leyland, Tata Motors, Maruti Suzuki and Mahindra & Mahindra are marketing their vehicles in Egypt, and Bajaj Auto dominated the three-wheelers market.

== See also ==
- Foreign relations of Egypt
- Foreign relations of India
- Egypt and the Non-Aligned Movement
- India and the Non-Aligned Movement
- Brioni Meeting
- Indians in Egypt
