= Cambodia–Yugoslavia relations =

- Cambodia: Yugoslavia

Cambodia and Yugoslavia

Cambodia–Yugoslavia relations were historical foreign relations between Cambodia and now split-up Socialist Federal Republic of Yugoslavia. The first official meeting between Norodom Sihanouk and President of Yugoslavia Josip Broz Tito happened in 1956 on Brijuni islands in Yugoslav constituent Socialist Republic of Croatia. Till 1976 Sihanouk visited Yugoslavia on five occasions while President Tito visited Cambodia twice. Cambodia was one of the countries represented at the 1961 Summit Conference of Heads of State or Government of the Non-Aligned Movement in Belgrade, the first conference of the Non-Aligned Movement. Yugoslavia credited and participated in construction of the Kirirom 1 Hydropower Dam which was completed in 1969.

Following the 1970 Cambodian coup d'état Yugoslavia maintained its relations with the GRUNK, a government-in-exile of Cambodia, based in Beijing. At the same time Yugoslavia opened its embassy in Phnom Penh but directed all of its official communication through the Embassy of Cambodia in Belgrade which was controlled by GRUNK.

Following the Khmer Rouge conquest of power and the declaration of the Democratic Kampuchea Yugoslavia was one of only a couple of countries in the world which maintained some formal bilateral relations with the new regime. In early 1978 Yugoslav reporters of Tanjug, Vjesnik and Politika were the first from Europe to be allowed to tour the country for two weeks. During the Cambodian–Vietnamese War, Belgrade believed that foreign interference was unjustified and could have led to wider Sino-Soviet conflict.

Following the breakup of Yugoslavia United Nations Transitional Administration for Eastern Slavonia, Baranja and Western Sirmium was designed following the earlier United Nations Transitional Authority in Cambodia example.

== See also ==
- Yugoslavia and the Non-Aligned Movement
- Cambodia–Serbia relations
