= List of international presidential trips made by Gamal Abdel Nasser =

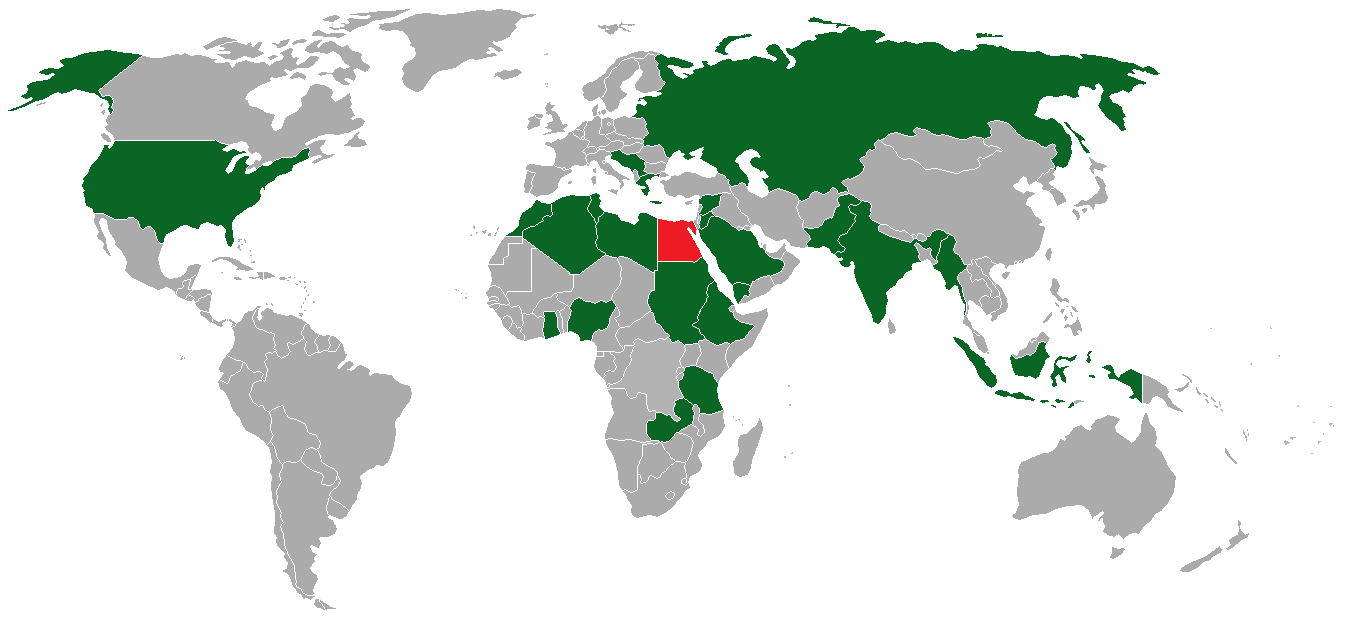

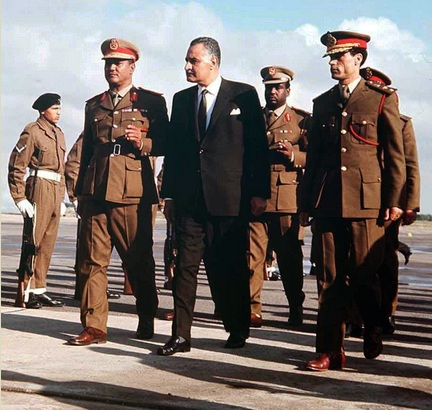
President Nasser, President of Sudan Jaafar al-Nimeiri, and Chairman of the Libyan Revolutionary Command Council Colonel Muammar Gaddafi, Tripoli, Libya.

The following list details the international visits undertaken during the presidency of Gamal Abdel Nasser, spanning from 1954 until his death in 1970.

== 1955 ==
| # | Country | Cities visited | Date(s) | Purpose | Event/Occasion | Notable figures met | Region | Ref |
|---|---|---|---|---|---|---|---|---|
| 1 | All-Palestine Protectorate | Gaza | 30 March 1955 | | | | Asia | |
| 2 | Pakistan | Karachi | April 1955 | Transit & bilateral talks | Bilateral visit before Bandung | Mohammad Ali Bogra | Asia | |
| 2 | Burma | Rangoon | April 1955 | Goodwill stopover | Thingyan New Year Celebration | U Nu, Jawaharlal Nehru | Asia | |
| 2 | Indonesia | Bandung | 18–24 April 1955 | Attend summit | Bandung Conference | Jawaharlal Nehru, Zhou Enlai, Sukarno | Asia | |

== 1956 ==
| # | Country | Cities visited | Date(s) | Purpose | Event/Occasion | Notable figures met | Region | Ref |
|---|---|---|---|---|---|---|---|---|
| 3 | Saudi Arabia | Jeddah | April 1956 | Trilateral summit | Signing of Arab defense pact with Saudi Arabia and Yemen | King Saud and Imam Ahmad bin Yahya | Arab world | |
| 4 | All-Palestine Protectorate | Gaza | 13 May 1956 | | | | Asia | |
| 5 | Yugoslavia | Belgrade, Brijuni | 13–19 July 1956 | State visit & summit | Brioni Meeting | Josip Broz Tito, Jawaharlal Nehru | Europe | |
| 6 | Saudi Arabia | Dhahran | 22 September 1956 | State visit | | | Arab world | |

== 1958 ==
| # | Country | Cities visited | Date(s) | Purpose | Event/Occasion | Notable figures met | Region | Ref |
|---|---|---|---|---|---|---|---|---|
| 7 | Syria | Damascus | 22 February 1958 | Union declaration | Formation of UAR | Shukri al-Quwatli | Arab world | |
| 8 | Soviet Union | Moscow | 29 April–15 May 1958 | State visit | May Day & diplomatic talks | Nikita Khrushchev | Europe | |
| 9 | Yugoslavia | Belgrade | 2–15 July 1958 | Diplomatic talks | Consultation | Josip Broz Tito | Europe | |

== 1960 ==
| # | Country | Cities visited | Date(s) | Purpose | Event/Occasion | Notable figures met | Region | Ref |
|---|---|---|---|---|---|---|---|---|
| 10 | India | New Delhi | March–April 1960 | State visit | Diplomatic talks | Jawaharlal Nehru, Rajendra Prasad | Asia | |
| 10 | Pakistan | Karachi, Lahore, Peshawar and Dhaka | 10–16 April 1960 | State visit | Diplomatic talks | Ayub Khan | Asia | |
| 11 | Greece | Athens | 7–9 June 1960 | State visit | Diplomatic meetings | King Paul I | Europe | |
| 11 | Yugoslavia | Belgrade, Brijuni | 12–20 June 1960 | State visit | Summit | Josip Broz Tito | Europe | |
| 12 | United States | New York | September 1960 | UNGA participation | 15th UN General Assembly | Dwight Eisenhower, Nikita Khrushchev, Jawaharlal Nehru, Josip Broz Tito, Harold Macmillan, and Fidel Castro | North America | |

== 1961 ==
| # | Country | Cities visited | Date(s) | Purpose | Event/Occasion | Notable figures met | Region | Ref |
|---|---|---|---|---|---|---|---|---|
| 13 | Yugoslavia | Belgrade | 1–6 September 1961 | Attend summit | 1st Non-Aligned Movement Summit | Josip Broz Tito, Jawaharlal Nehru | Europe | |

== 1963 ==
| # | Country | Cities visited | Date(s) | Purpose | Event/Occasion | Notable figures met | Region | Ref |
|---|---|---|---|---|---|---|---|---|
| 14 | Algeria | Algiers | 4–11 May 1963 | State visit | Conveying congratulations on independence and backing the government | Ahmed Ben Bella | Arab world | |
| 15 | Yugoslavia | Brijuni | 13 May 1963 | Diplomatic talks | Bilateral discussions | Josip Broz Tito | Europe | |
| 16 | Ethiopia | Addis Ababa | 24 July 1963 | Attend summit | OAU Founding Summit | Haile Selassie | Africa | |
| 17 | Tunisia | Bizerte | December 1963 | Attend independence event | French withdrawal from Bizerte | Habib Bourguiba | Arab world | |

== 1964 ==
| # | Country | Cities visited | Date(s) | Purpose | Event/Occasion | Notable figures met | Region | Ref |
|---|---|---|---|---|---|---|---|---|
| 18 | North Yemen | Sanaa | 23–28 April 1964 | State visit | Support for Republican government | Abdullah al-Sallal | Arab world | |

== 1965 ==
| # | Country | Cities visited | Date(s) | Purpose | Event/Occasion | Notable figures met | Region | Ref |
|---|---|---|---|---|---|---|---|---|
| 19 | Saudi Arabia | Jeddah | 22–24 August 1965 | State visit | Signed the Jeddah Agreement | Faisal bin Abdulaziz Al Saud | Arab world | |
| 20 | Soviet Union | Moscow | 27–31 August 1965 | State visit | Signing of trade deal | Leonid Brezhnev | Europe | |
| 21 | Yugoslavia | Belgrade | 1–5 September 1965 | State visit | Diplomatic talks | Josip Broz Tito | Europe | |
| 22 | Morocco | Casablanca | 13–18 September 1965 | Attend summit | 3rd Arab League Summit | King Hassan II | Arab world | |
| 23 | Ghana | Accra | October 1965 | Attend summit | 2nd OAU Summit | Kwame Nkrumah | Africa | |
| 24 | Nigeria | Kano | November 1965 | State visit | Strengthen ties with Africa | Regional officials | Africa | |

== 1966 ==
| # | Country | Cities visited | Date(s) | Purpose | Event/Occasion | Notable figures met | Region | Ref |
|---|---|---|---|---|---|---|---|---|
| 25 | Tanzania | Dar es Salaam, Zanzibar | September 1966 | State visit | Afro-Arab cooperation tour | Julius Nyerere | Africa | |
| 26 | Ethiopia | Addis Ababa | November 1966 | Attend summit | 4th OAU Summit | Haile Selassie | Africa | |

== 1967 ==
| # | Country | Cities visited | Date(s) | Purpose | Event/Occasion | Notable figures met | Region | Ref |
|---|---|---|---|---|---|---|---|---|
| 27 | Sudan | Khartoum | August – September 1967 | Attend summit | Arab Summit | King Faisal, Arab leaders | Arab world | |

== 1968 ==
| # | Country | Cities visited | Date(s) | Purpose | Event/Occasion | Notable figures met | Region | Ref |
|---|---|---|---|---|---|---|---|---|
| 28 | Soviet Union | Moscow | 5–12 July 1968 | State visit | Talks concerning demands for Israeli withdrawal from Arab territories | Leonid Brezhnev, Alexei Kosygin, Nikolai Podgorny | Europe | |
| 29 | Algeria | Algiers | 13–16 September 1968 | Attend summit | 5th OAU Summit | Houari Boumédiène | Arab world | |

== 1969 ==
| # | Country | Cities visited | Date(s) | Purpose | Event/Occasion | Notable figures met | Region | Ref |
|---|---|---|---|---|---|---|---|---|
| 30 | Morocco | Rabat | 20–24 December 1969 | Attend summit | 5th Arab League Summit | King Hassan II, King Faisal | Arab world | |
| 30 | Libya | Tripoli | 25–29 December 1969 | Diplomatic visit | Consultation with new government | Muammar Gaddafi | Arab world | |

== 1970 ==
| # | Country | Cities visited | Date(s) | Purpose | Event/Occasion | Notable figures met | Region | Ref |
|---|---|---|---|---|---|---|---|---|
| 31 | Sudan | Khartoum | January 1970 | State visit and political rally | Sudan Independence Day celebrations | Jaafar Nimeiry | Arab world | |
| 32 | Libya | Tripoli | 20–23 June 1970 | Backing the new government and extending advice | Attending the celebrations marking the evacuation of foreign forces from Libyan bases | Muammar Gaddafi, other Arab leaders | Arab world | |
| 33 | Soviet Union | Moscow | June – July 1970 | State visit | Military talks and arms deal | Leonid Brezhnev, Alexei Kosygin | Europe | |
| 34 | Zambia | Lusaka | September 1970 | Attend summit | 3rd NAM Summit | Kenneth Kaunda, Josip Broz Tito | Africa | |
