= Cambodia–Serbia relations =

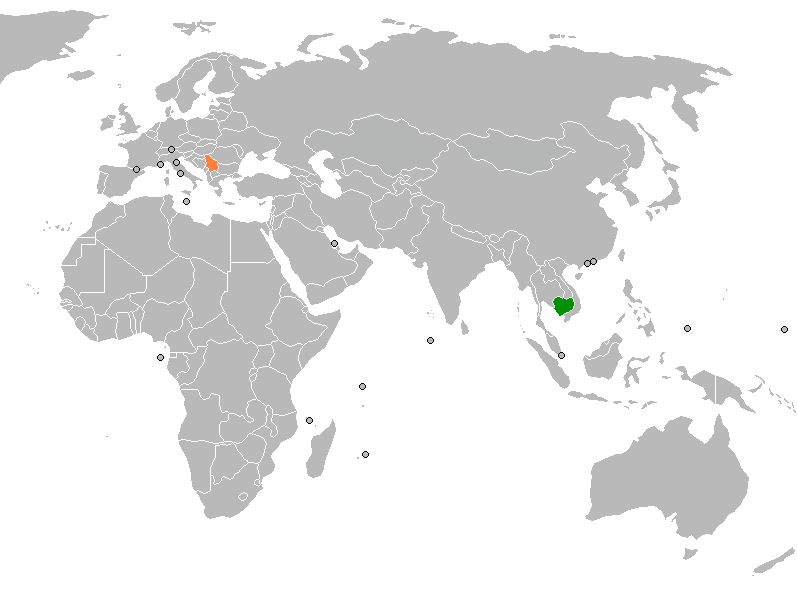
- Cambodia: Serbia

Cambodia and Serbia maintain diplomatic relations established between Cambodia and SFR Yugoslavia in 1956. From 1956 to 2006, Cambodia maintained relations with the Socialist Federal Republic of Yugoslavia (SFRY) and the Federal Republic of Yugoslavia (FRY) (later Serbia and Montenegro), of which Serbia is considered shared (SFRY) or sole (FRY) legal successor.

== History ==
The notorious leader of the Khmer Rouge, Pol Pot, worked as part of an international brigade building roads in Yugoslavia in the early 1950s. At the time, Yugoslavia had split from the sphere of the Soviet Union, and Pol Pot was very impressed with the mass mobilization of public works and cultural collectivization of the small communist nation. He recalled the trip with great fondness, and, once he gained power, sought to improve the relationship between Yugoslavia and Kampuchea. Josip Tito, the President of Yugoslavia, visited Cambodia multiple times during the 1960s and 70s. Despite Pol Pot's admiration for Tito and his policies, Tito was critical of the Khmer Rouge and the decision not to support the regime caused tension between Belgrade and Moscow in 1979. However, despite his dislike for the Khmer Rouge regime, Tito did not support the Vietnamese invasion of Cambodia. During the Cold War and prior to the Breakup of Yugoslavia, the nations had embassies in each other's capitals.

In 2011, Cambodia and Serbia declared the restoration of diplomatic ties after an almost 40-year absence. Both countries also pledged political support for one another on the world stage. Cambodia supports Serbia's position on the Kosovo issue, and the government pledged its support for Serbia's territorial integrity.

== Resident diplomatic missions ==
- Cambodia has an embassy in Belgrade.
- Serbia is represented in Serbia through its embassy in Jakarta (Indonesia).

== See also ==
- Foreign relations of Cambodia
- Foreign relations of Serbia
- Cambodia–Yugoslavia relations
- Yugoslavia and the Non-Aligned Movement
