= 1987 Mediterranean Non-Aligned Countries Ministerial Meeting =

Ministerial Meeting

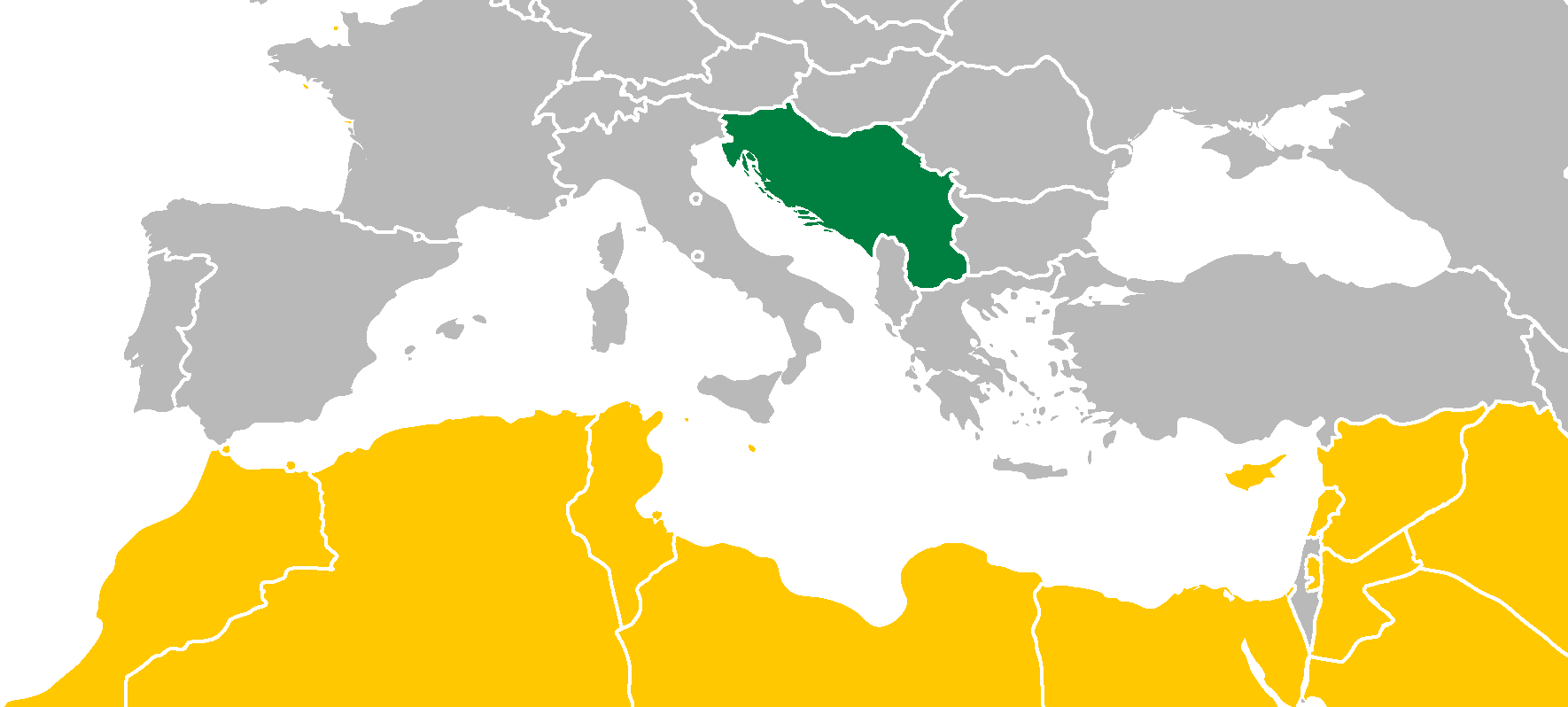
- Mediterranean member states of the NAM in yellow and dark green (Yugoslavia)
- Host country: Yugoslavia
- Date: 1987
- Cities: Brijuni Islands (SR Croatia)
- Chair: Lazar Mojsov (President of the Presidency of Yugoslavia)

The 1987 Mediterranean Non-Aligned Countries Ministerial Meeting (Serbo-Croatian: Samit mediteranskih zemalja Pokreta nesvrstanih 1987.) held on the Brijuni Islands, SR Croatia, SFR Yugoslavia was the second ministerial meeting of the Non-Aligned countries from the Mediterranean region. The participating countries were exclusively Non-Aligned nations in the Mediterranean area and as such focused primarily on regional issues. At the time of the meeting, the group included Southern Mediterranean and Levantine Arab countries and only three European Non-Aligned countries of Malta, Cyprus and SFR Yugoslavia.

The Adriatic islands of Brijuni had been the setting for many of the movements' events, including the 1956 meeting between Yugoslav President Josip Broz Tito, Indian Prime Minister Jawaharlal Nehru, and President of Egypt Gamal Abdel Nasser, as well as numerous bilateral and informal meetings between president Tito (one of the founders of NAM) and Valentina Tereshkova, Che Guevara, Alberto Moravia, Mario Del Monaco, Sophia Loren, Elizabeth Taylor, Richard Burton and numerous state representatives.

== See also ==
- Brioni Meeting
- Yugoslavia and the Non-Aligned Movement
- Foreign relations of Yugoslavia
- EU Med Group
- Yugoslavia at the Mediterranean Games
  - 1979 Mediterranean Games
