= Indians in Egypt =

Indians in Egypt الهنود في مصر
Total population
- 3,600

Regions with significant populations
- Cairo · Sharm-el-Sheikh

Languages
- Arabic · Indian Languages · English

Religion
- Hinduism · Islam · Sikhism · Christianity

Related ethnic groups
- Person of Indian Origin, Indian diaspora

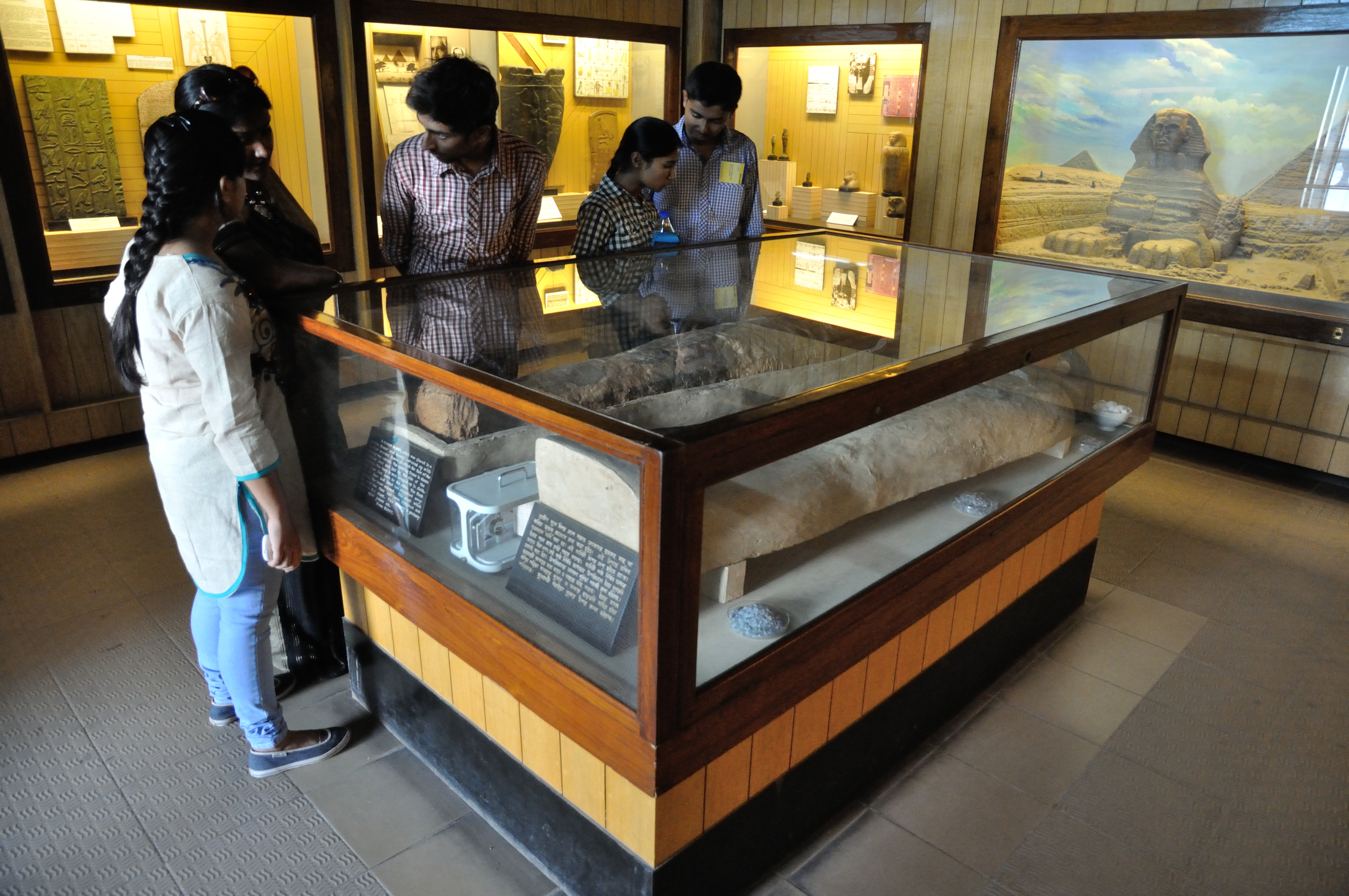
Indian Museum in Egypt

There is a small community of Indians in Egypt includes Indian expatriates in Egypt, as well as Egyptian citizens of Indian origin or descent. Most of the Indian residents have senior level jobs, with the majority being professionals working for multinationals in the oil and gas, banking and IT sector and their postings are mainly senior positions, which means typically they are at least in their thirties and accompanied by their families. There are currently about 300 Indian companies, having joint ventures or wholly owned subsidiaries or offices in Egypt. Some of the top Indian companies with investments in Egypt are Wipro, Mahindra & Mahindra, Jindals, Indorama Ventures and Tatas.

During the 2011 Egyptian revolution, many Indians, mostly women and children, returned to India due to the spiraling crisis in the country. Some Indian tourists were stranded in Sharm-el-Sheikh during the crisis. There are no reports of any Indian having been injured or assaulted since the unrest began. Despite the unrest, many Indian companies have been continuing normal operations.

== See also ==
- Egypt–India relations
- Hinduism in Egypt
