= 1961 Preparatory Meeting of the Non-Alignment Countries =

1969 Belgrade Non-Aligned Consultative Meeting

- Host country: United Arab Republic
- Date: 5–12 June 1961
- Cities: Cairo
- Chair: Gamal Abdel Nasser (President of Egypt)

1961 Preparatory Meeting of the Non-Alignment Countries was held in Cairo, United Arab Republic (today Egypt) from 5 to 12 June 1961 to discuss the goals of a policy of nonalignment and set common criteria for attendance at the 1st Summit of the Non-Aligned Movement, which would take place in September 1961 in Belgrade, SFR Yugoslavia.

Cairo attendees were divided into two factions: inclusives, led by Nehru's government of India; and exclusives, led by the Casablanca Group. Inclusives wanted the future summit to welcome neutral countries in Europe and, if feasible, multiple Latin American countries. Indian representatives believed inclusives focussed on issues of global consequence, unlike the more parochial concerns of exclusives. Cuban and Guinean representatives were dominant in the exclusives faction, which wanted to focus on the issue of decolonization and criticism of the Western Bloc.

== See also ==
- Foreign relations of Egypt
- Egypt and the Non-Aligned Movement
- Third All-African Peoples' Conference
