= Institute of International Politics and Economics =

Serbian think tank

Institute of International Politics and Economics Институт за међународну политику и привреду
- Founders: Scientific and research organization of the Ministry of Science, Technological Development and Innovation of the Republic of Serbia
- Established: 1947; 79 years ago
- Focus: Scientific institute in the field of social sciences: law, political science, economics, security science
- Chair: Branislav Đorđević, director
- Address: Makedonska 25; 11 000 Beograd
- Location: Belgrade, Serbia
- Website: www.diplomacy.bg.ac.rs

The Institute of International Politics and Economics (Serbian Cyrillic: Институт за међународну политику и привреду) is a scientific institute - an organization in the field of social sciences performing scientific and research activities of general interest to the Republic of Serbia.

== History ==
The Institute of International Politics and Economics was established on 8 December 1947 by the Government of the Federal People's Republic of Yugoslavia (Act on the Establishment of the Institute of International Politics and Economics, "Official Gazette of the FPRY", number 107/1947), as one of the oldest scientific institutes in Southeast Europe. From a small group of researchers who laid the foundations of Yugoslav International Relations, the Institute has gradually turned into one of the most respected scientific institutions in this field in Europe. From its founding, the Institute has been consistently working on the scientific study of processes and phenomena in the field of international politics and economics, thus creating a research basis for the definition the country's foreign policy priorities.

In the former Yugoslavia, the status of the Institute of International Politics and Economics was linked to the federal organs which were formulating and implementing the country's foreign policy (Law on the Institute for International Politics and Economics, "Official Gazette of SFRY", No. 11/1974, The Regulation on the Federal Public Institution – Institute for International Politics and Economics, "Official Gazette", No. 11/1997, 5/2002).

After the breakup of Yugoslavia and the disintegration of the State Union of Serbia and Montenegro, the Institute ceased to function as institutions of federal importance. With the Government Decision on the exercise of founding rights in public enterprises, public institutions and organizations in which the founder's rights was the Federal Republic of Yugoslavia ("Official Gazette of the Republic of Serbia", No. 49/2006), the Institute came under the jurisdiction of the Serbian Ministry of Science and Technological Development (Law on Scientific Research, "Official Gazette of the Republic of Serbia" No. 110/2005, 50/2006 – corr. and 18/2010)

The Institute is realizing close cooperation with the Ministry of Science, Technological Development and Innovation of the Republic of Serbia. It is currently realizing the project "Serbia and Challenges in International Relations in 2026" of the Ministry of Science, Technological Development and innovation of the Republic of Serbia.

Projects

- Project "Perspectives 2030" in collaboration with the China-CEE Institute from Budapest
- Contributing to Modern Partnerships: Assessments of Sino-EU-Serbian Relations (COMPASS). Project funded by the Science Fund of the Republic of Serbia.
- Serbia and Challenges in International Relations (2020-2026). Supported by the Ministry of Science, Technological Development and Innovation of the Republic of Serbia.
- The Relations Between China, North Macedonia and Serbia in the Changing Geopolitical Context. Realized by the Faculty of Philosophy, University Ss. Cyril and Methodius from Skopje and the Institute of International Politics and Economics. Supported by the China-CEE Institute, Budapest.
- Serbia in Contemporary International Relations (2011-2019). Supported by the Serbian Ministry of Education, Science and Technological Development.
- Impact of the EU conditionality on minority rights and protection in Slovakia and Serbia (2011-2013). Funded by Ministry of Science of the Republic of Slovakia and Ministry of Education and Science of the Republic of Serbia within the framework of bilateral programmes of academic cooperation
- Debating Serbiaʼs European Future: The voice of civil society in decision making (2010-2011). Funded by the European Union under the “Strengthening Serbia-EU Civil Society Dialogue” project

== Institute journals ==
The IIPE publishes four journals:

- International Problems (Међународни проблеми)
- Међународна политика (International Politics)
- Тhе Review of International Affairs
- European Union Legislation (Европско законодавствo)

== Awards ==
- For outstanding achievements and contribution to the study of international relations, as well on the occasion of the 70th anniversary, the Institute of International Politics and Economics was awarded the Sretenje Medal by the decree of the President of the Republic of Serbia (No. KOPR 19) on 9 February 2017.
- IIPE is the only scientific institution in the field of social sciences and humanities in Serbia awarded by Government of the Republic of Serbia's Certificate of Appreciation for its contribution to the effective fight of our country against Covid-19 disease caused by SARS-Cov-2 virus. The Certificate was awarded by the Prime Minister of the Republic of Serbia, Ana Brnabić, on 22 May 2020.
- In 2022, on the occasion of the 75th anniversary of the Institute of International Politics and Economics, the "Post of Serbia" printed the jubilar postal stamp.
- The Institute of International Politics and Economics was awarded in 2022 with the most prestigious social recognition of the Republic of Serbia – the St. Sava Award - for its contribution to education and science.

== Organization ==
- Governing Board
- Management
- Researchers
- Professional staff

== Directors ==
The current director of the Institute of International Politics and Economics is prof. dr Branislav Đorđević.

The directors of the Institute of International Politics and Economics in the previous period:

Milan BARTOŠ (1947–1949)

Ivan KARAIVANOV (1949–1951)

Vilko VINTERHALTER (1951)

Radivoje DAVIDOVIĆ (1952–1953)

Jovan MARINOVIĆ (1954–1955)

Vlajko BEGOVIĆ (1955–1958)

Janez STANOVNIK (1958–1962)

Leo MATES (1962–1972)

Milan ŠAHOVIĆ (1972–1977)

Božidar FRANGEŠ (1977–1985)

Milan ŠAHOVIĆ (1985–1988)

Jokica HADŽI VASILEVA (1988–1989)

Predrag SIMIĆ (1989–1997)

Milenko KREĆA (1997–2000)

Vatroslav VEKARIĆ (2000–2005)

Aleksandar FATIĆ (2005–2006)

Edita STOJIĆ-KARANOVIĆ (2007–2008)

Duško DIMITRIJEVIĆ (2009–2014)

Branislav ĐORĐEVIĆ (2015-)

== See also ==
- Yugoslavia and the Non-Aligned Movement
