= Egypt and the Non-Aligned Movement =

Egypt was one of the founding members of the Non-Aligned Movement (NAM). The preparatory meeting for the First NAM Conference in Belgrade was held in Cairo between 5 and 12 June 1961. The first NAM conference was cosponsored between President of Egypt Gamal Abdel Nasser and President of Yugoslavia Josip Broz Tito who sent joint letter to other leaders during their bilateral meeting in Egypt. Cairo hosted the Second Conference in October 1964 attended by forty-seven countries while Egyptian Red Sea resort Sharm el-Sheikh hosted the Fifteenth Conference in 2009. At the time of the Sharm el-Sheikh Conference 118 countries participated in the activities of the movement with some other countries having the observer status. 55 heads of state attended the 2009 conference. Official Egyptian state institutions view the movement as the broadest and the most important framework for developing countries to coordinate their stances on issues on the agenda of the United Nations and to act together against unilateral policies.

== History ==
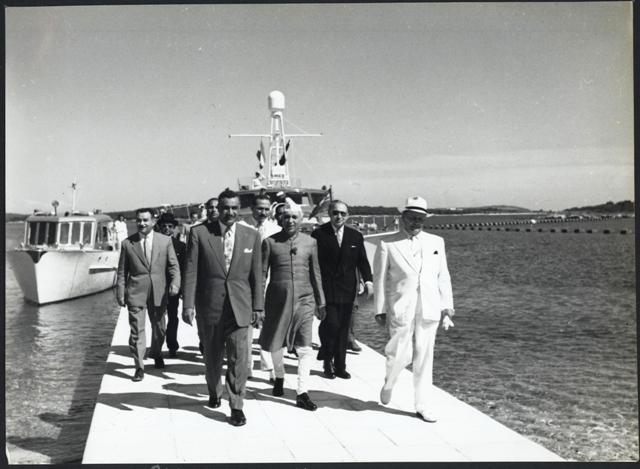
Nasser, Tito and Nehru on Brijuni Islands in 1956

President Gamal Abdel Nasser, together with Josip Broz Tito of Yugoslavia, Jawaharlal Nehru of India, Kwame Nkrumah of Ghana and Sukarno of Indonesia played the leading role in the early days of the movement. Following the Egyptian revolution of 1952 and president Nasser's charismatic authority in other Arab countries other countries in the Arab world followed Egyptian lead in joining the Non-Aligned Movement.

After the Camp David Accords some Arab countries and Cuba strongly criticized Egypt with Iraqi representatives calling for suspension of Egypt's membership in the NAM. This initiative was opposed by India and Yugoslavia as a matter of principle with Yugoslavia underlining its dissatisfaction with Egyptian failure to ensure earlier Arab common stance for the Camp David negotiations.

== See also ==
- 2nd Summit of the Non-Aligned Movement
- India and the Non-Aligned Movement
- Egypt–India relations
- Yugoslavia and the Non-Aligned Movement
- Egypt–Yugoslavia relations
