= Brioni Meeting =

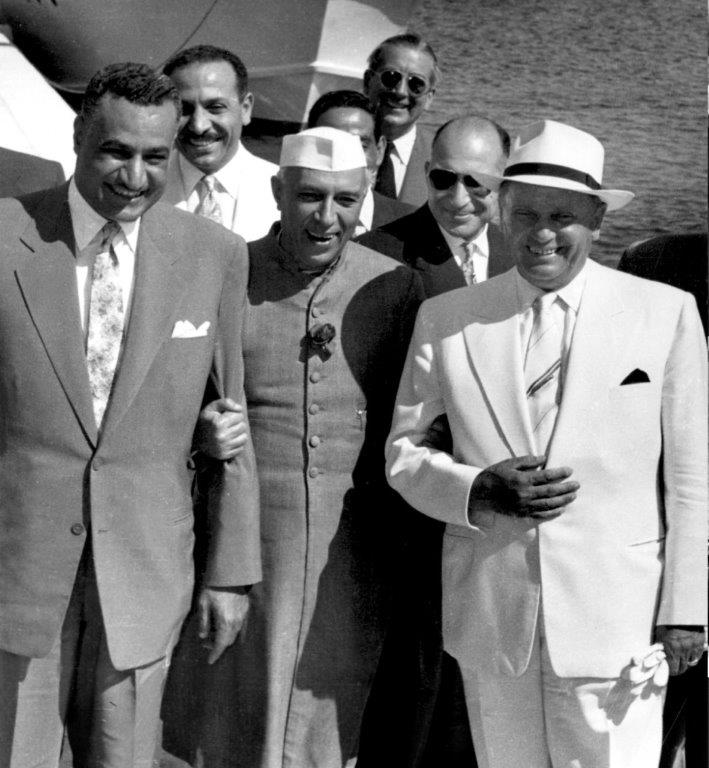
- Three leaders arriving at Brijuni.
- Host country: Yugoslavia
- Date: 1956
- Cities: Brijuni Islands (PR Croatia)
- Participants: ★ Gamal Abdel Nasser (President of Egypt) ★ Jawaharlal Nehru (Prime Minister of India) ★ Josip Broz Tito (President of Yugoslavia)

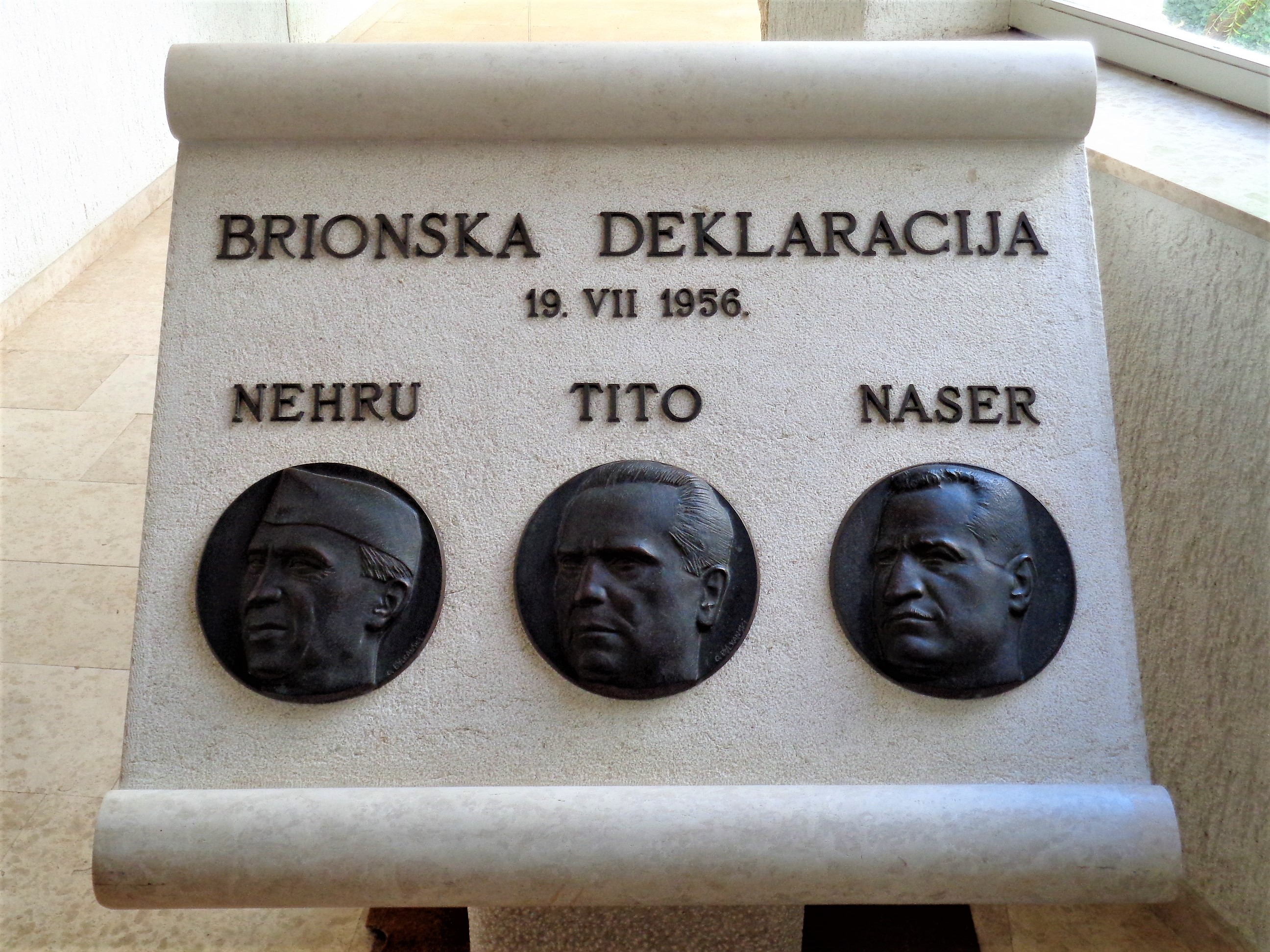
Memorial stone plaque dedicated to Brijuni Declaration in the Brijuni Museums, Brijuni Islands.

The Brioni Meeting (Serbo-Croatian: Brionski sastanak) between President of Egypt Gamal Abdel Nasser, Prime Minister of India Jawaharlal Nehru and their host President of Yugoslavia Josip Broz Tito took place on the Brijuni Islands, PR Croatia, FPR Yugoslavia on 19 July 1956. The conference was one of the major initiatives among countries unaffiliated to neither Eastern or Western Bloc prior to the establishment of the Non-Aligned Movement at the 1961 Belgrade Summit. 120 Yugoslav and foreign journalists followed the meeting.

The three leaders signed a document known as the Brioni Declaration, stating "Peace cannot be achieved via division, but via striving for collective security on the global scale. Achieved by the expansion of the area of freedom, as well as through the ending of domination of one country over another." French media criticized the Yugoslav hosts for giving a prominent role to the issue of the liberation struggle in French Algeria. British analysts noted Nasser's insistence on the issue, Nehru's moderation efforts, and Tito's decision not to meet with representatives of the Algerian delegates during the conference.

== See also ==
- Tito–Stalin split
- Balkan Pact (1953)
- Belgrade declaration (1955)
- Suez Crisis
- 1987 Mediterranean Non-Aligned Countries Ministerial Meeting
- Egypt and the Non-Aligned Movement
- India and the Non-Aligned Movement
- Yugoslavia and the Non-Aligned Movement
