= Yugoslavia and the Non-Aligned Movement =

Yugoslav involvement in the Cold War

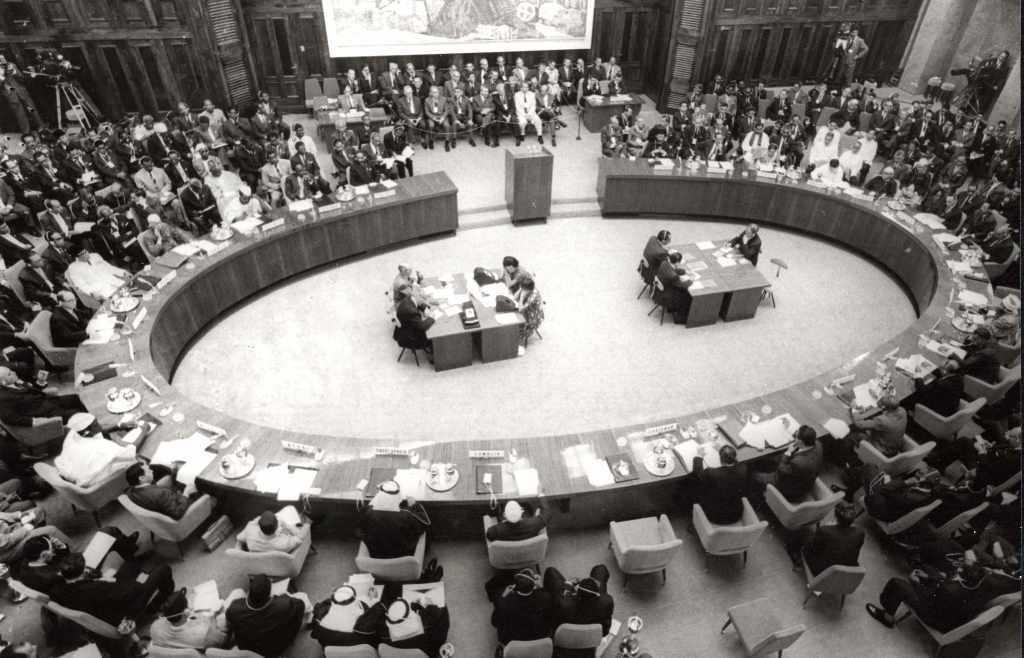
First Summit of the Non-Aligned Movement, Belgrade

The Socialist Federal Republic of Yugoslavia was a founding member of the Non-Aligned Movement, an international groupation established to maintain independence of countries beyond Eastern and Western Bloc from the major Cold War powers. Belgrade, the capital of Yugoslavia, hosted the First Summit of the Non-Aligned Movement in September 1961 and the Ninth Summit in September 1989.

Non-alignment was a cornerstone of Yugoslavia's Cold War foreign policy and ideology. As the only socialist state in Europe outside the Eastern Bloc, and one with strong economic ties to Western Europe, Yugoslavia pursued a careful policy of balancing and equidistance between the United States, the Soviet Union, and China. This stance, together with active nonaligned multilateralism, was seen as a collective safeguard of the country's political independence. The Non-Aligned Movement also provided Yugoslavia with additional diplomatic flexibility, contrasting with neutral states such as Finland at the time, whose policies were more constrained by great power influences, a phenomenon often referred to as Finlandization. Yugoslavia's leadership in the Non-Aligned Movement granted it a disproportionately influential role in Cold War diplomacy, elevating its global standing beyond its comparatively modest population and economic size, and military power, with some authors even describing it as a "third diplomatic power" during certain moments of the Cold War, particularly in the Global South issues.

The end of the Cold War and the subsequent dissolution of Yugoslavia raised questions about the future of the Non-Aligned Movement. However, the movement's continuity was ensured through the pragmatic leadership of Indonesia during this period. Today, the archives in Belgrade and the rest of former Yugoslavia remain largely untapped but often vital for Cold War historians, offering unique insights due to the extensive documents produced and information collected by Yugoslav diplomats and intelligence services during that time.

== History ==
=== Post–1948 Yugoslav context ===
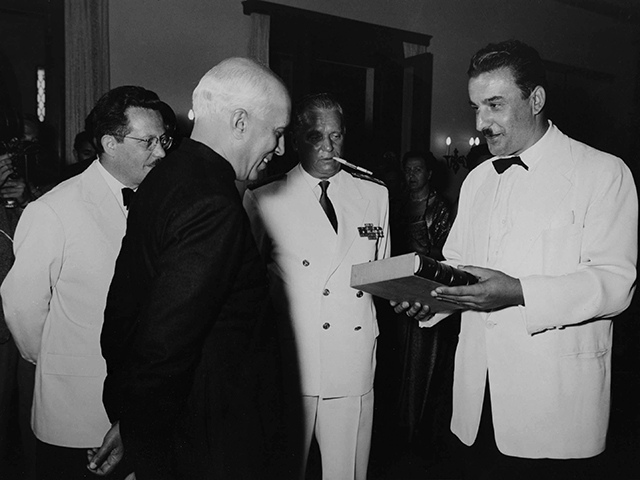
Indian Prime Minister Jawaharlal Nehru in Yugoslavia in 1955

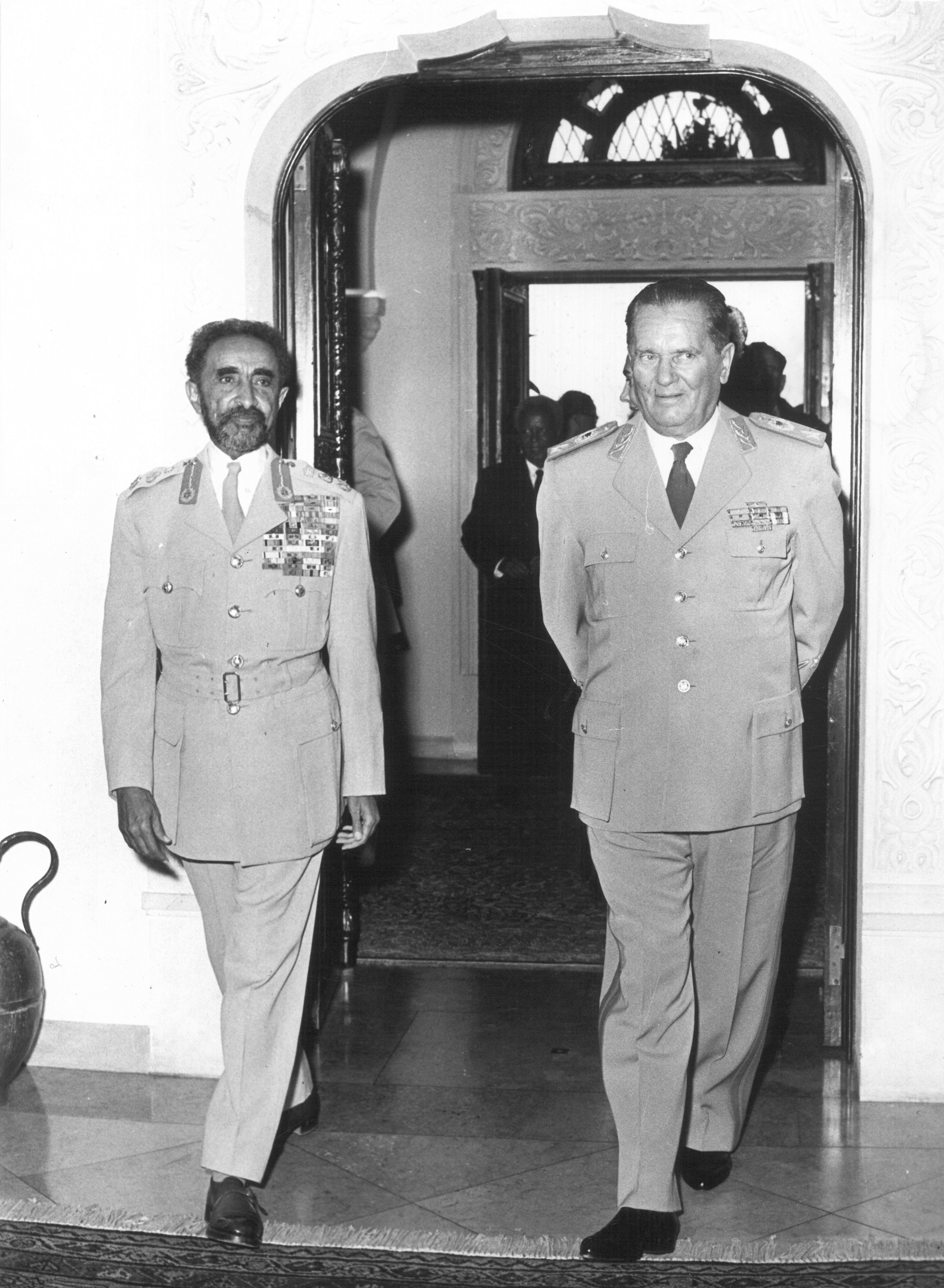
Haile Selassie, Emperor of Ethiopia and Josip Broz Tito, President of Yugoslavia, in Belgrade 1963

During World War II, Yugoslav Partisans liberated their country with only minimal help from the Soviet Red Army and Western allies. This led the new communist authorities to the belief that contrary to other countries in Eastern Europe, they are entitled to follow a more independent socialist course. Unlike other communist parties in the region, the Communist Party of Yugoslavia was able to rely on local army, police, and relatively high legitimacy among diverse Yugoslav demographic groups. Yugoslavia did not perceive itself as a client, but as a partner of the USSR, and in many respect pursued its own domestic and foreign policy which sometimes was more assertive than Moscow's policy. This was the case concerning the issue of the Free Territory of Trieste, Balkan Federation, Greek Civil War, Austro-Slovene conflict in Carinthia and infiltration and relations with the Albanian National Liberation Movement. Belgrade's independent policies raised tensions with Moscow and escalated in the 1948 Tito–Stalin split when Yugoslavia found itself exiled from the Eastern Bloc and in need to redefine its foreign policy.

The country initially oriented itself towards the Western Bloc and signed the 1953 Balkan Pact with the NATO member states of the Kingdom of Greece and Turkey. After the death of Stalin, Yugoslav relations with the USSR improved with the country's verbal support for the Soviet intervention in Hungary (contrary to the 1968 one in Czechoslovakia). The 1955 Belgrade declaration decreased reliance on the 1953 Balkan Pact which subsequently discontinued its activities. As the country still wanted to preserve its newly gained independence, it developed relations with European neutral countries such as Finland. It also avoided joining the Warsaw Pact established in May 1955. Yet in order to avoid isolation in deeply divided Europe, Yugoslavia looked for new allies among former colonies and mandate territories. Yugoslavia supported Egypt during the Suez Crisis, a country which became one of the founding members of the Non-aligned movement. Yugoslavia developed its relations with India, another founding member, from the time of their concurrent mandate at the UN Security Council from the end of 1949 onward.

=== Origins of the Movement ===
In the early 1950 Yugoslav leaders sought to build ties with Western European socialist parties, especially the West German SPD, but were soon disillusioned by their unwillingness to distance themselves from the Western bloc. Disappointed, Belgrade turned its attention to recently decolonized countries, despite limited knowledge and internal scepticism about aligning with what some Yugoslav officials dismissively called the “world of miserables”. While initially wary of Third World elites, Yugoslav leadership gradually recognized the strategic value in exploiting tensions within both Cold War camps to advance their non-aligned path.

During the 1950 United Nations General Assembly session, prominent Yugoslav politician and at the time Minister of Foreign Affairs Edvard Kardelj stated that "Yugoslavia cannot accept that mankind must choose between domination by one or other power". The term non-alignment was used for the first time in the same year when both India and Yugoslavia rejected alignment with any side in the Korean War. In 1951 Tito said that he will never agree that only great powers should determine the destiny of the world in which he effectively rejected Comintern's idea on dichotomous division of the world. He rejected claims that India and Yugoslavia want to establish the third bloc. In August 1954 Vijaya Lakshmi Pandit (at the time president of the United Nations General Assembly) visited Yugoslavia and invited Tito to visit India. On 22 December 1954 meeting in New Delhi Indian Prime Minister Jawaharlal Nehru and President of Yugoslavia Josip Broz Tito signed a joint statement stipulating that "the policy of non-alignment adopted and pursued by their respective countries is not 'neutrality' or 'neutralism' and therefore passivity, as sometimes alleged, but is a positive, active and constructive policy seeking to lead to collective peace".

=== From 1956 Brioni Meeting until the 1961 Belgrade Conference ===
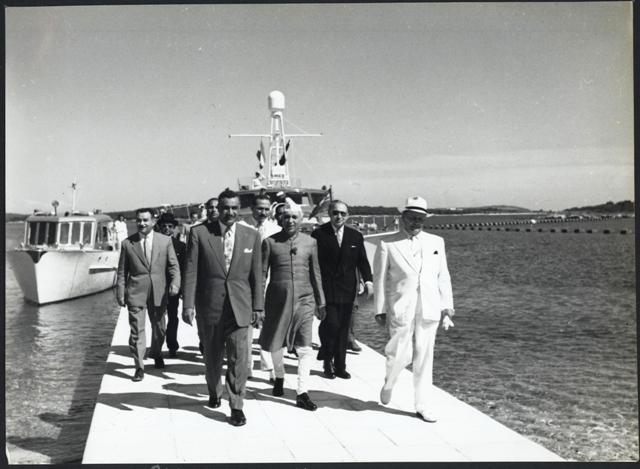
Nehru, Nasserand Tito at the Brioni Islands meeting, 1956.

The Brioni Meeting between Yugoslav President Josip Broz Tito, Indian Prime Minister Jawaharlal Nehru, and President of Egypt Gamal Abdel Nasser, took place on the Brijuni Islands in the Yugoslav constituent People's Republic of Croatia on 19 July 1956. The three leaders signed a document expressing that: "Peace cannot be achieved via division, but via striving for collective security on the global scale. Achieved by the expansion of the area of freedom, as well as through the ending of domination of one country over another."

In late 1958, and early 1959, president Tito, and the rest of Yugoslav delegation, initiated a three months long international boat trip on board the Yugoslav training ship Galeb. During the trip, the delegation visited Indonesia, India, Burma, Ceylon, Ethiopia, Sudan, Egypt and Syria. Indonesian president Sukarno called Tito a world citizen, while Tito referred to the Bandung Conference by saying "Bandung is the place from which a new spirit originated which permeate humanity". During his stay in Bandung president Tito received an honorary doctorate in law.

=== The 1961 Non-Aligned Conference in Belgrade ===
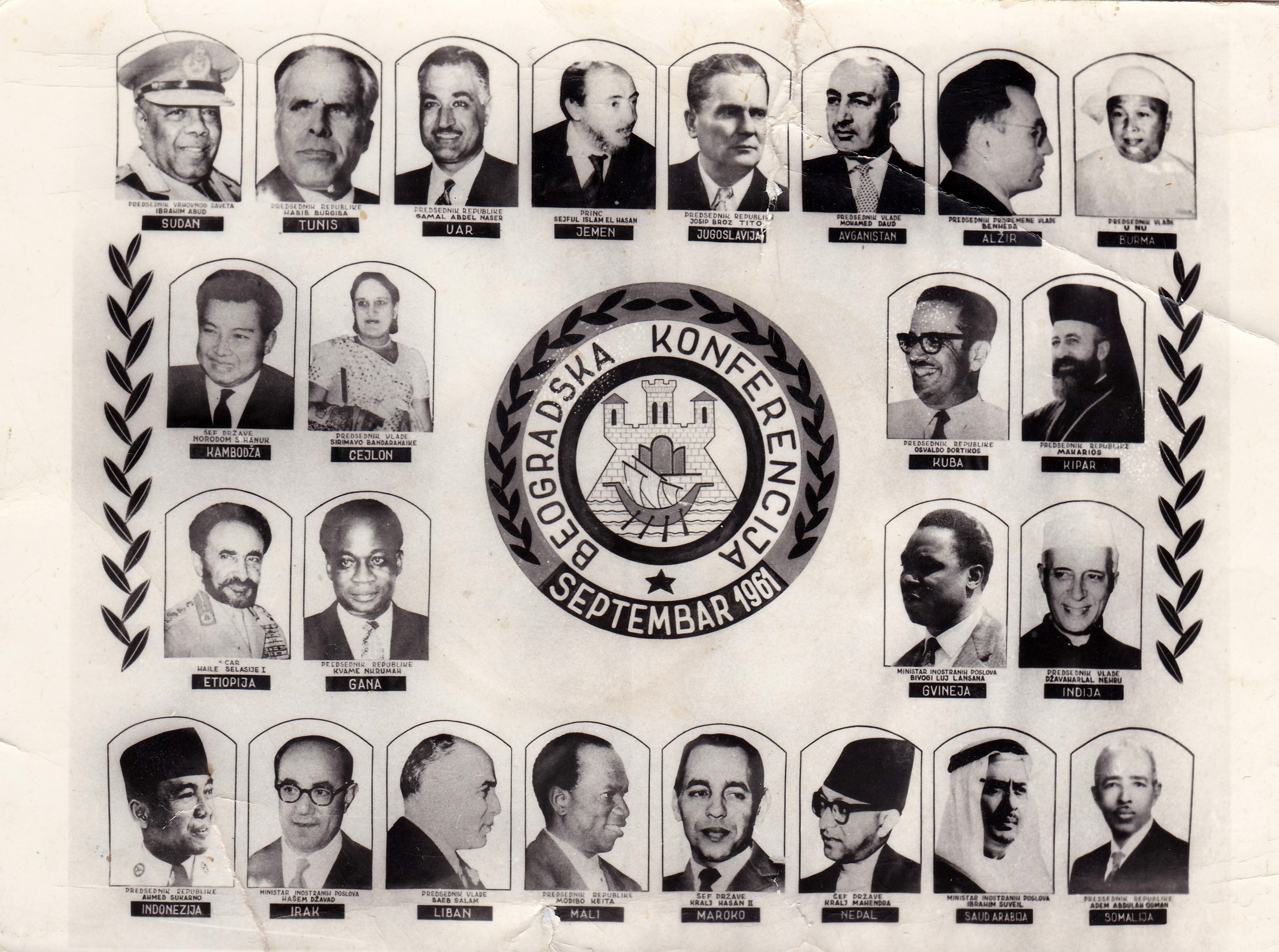
Heads of State or Government who participated in 1961 Conference.

The 1961 Summit Conference of Heads of State or Government of the Non-Aligned Movement was the first official conference of the Non-Aligned Movement. A major contributing factor to the organization of the conference was the process of decolonization of a number of African countries in the 1960s. Some therefore called it the ″Third World's Yalta″ in reference to 1945 Yalta Conference. Twenty-five countries in total participated in Belgrade Conference including Afghanistan, Algeria, Burma, Ethiopia, Ghana, Guinea, India, Indonesia, Iraq, Yemen, Yugoslavia, Cambodia, Cyprus, Tunisia, United Arab Republic, and Ceylon, while 3 countries, Bolivia, Brazil and Ecuador, were observers. The preparatory meeting of Non-Aligned Countries took place earlier that year in Cairo June 5–12, 1961. One of the issues was division of the newly independent countries over the Congo Crisis which led to a rift and creation of the conservative and anti-radical Brazzaville Group and radical nationalist Casablanca Group. All members of the Casablanca Group attended the conference, including Algeria, Ghana, Guinea, Mali, Morocco and the United Arab Republic, while none of the Brazzaville Group was present.

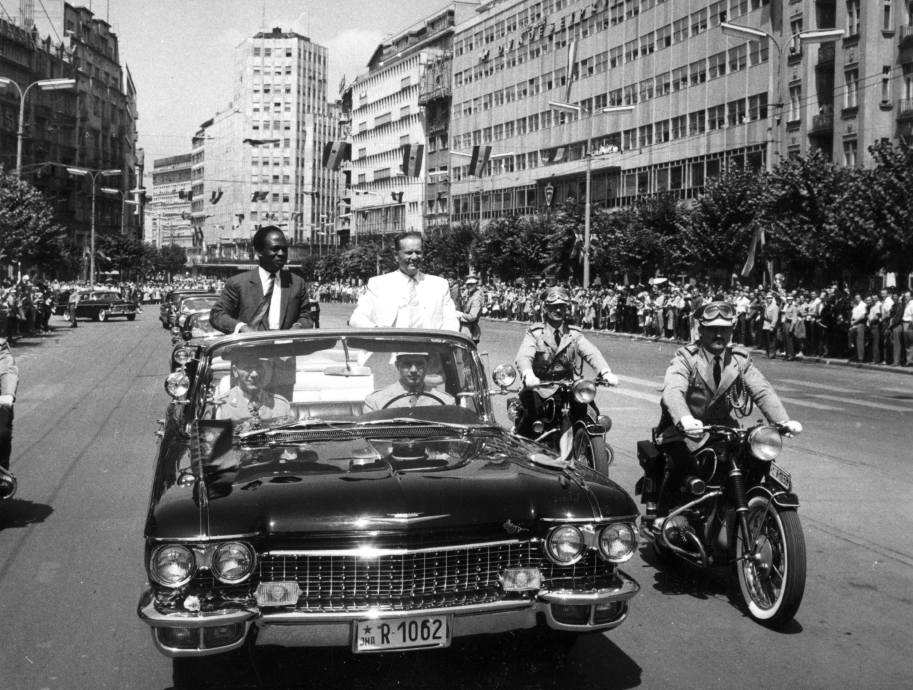
President of Ghana Kwame Nkrumah and President of Yugoslavia Josip Broz Tito arrive at the Conference

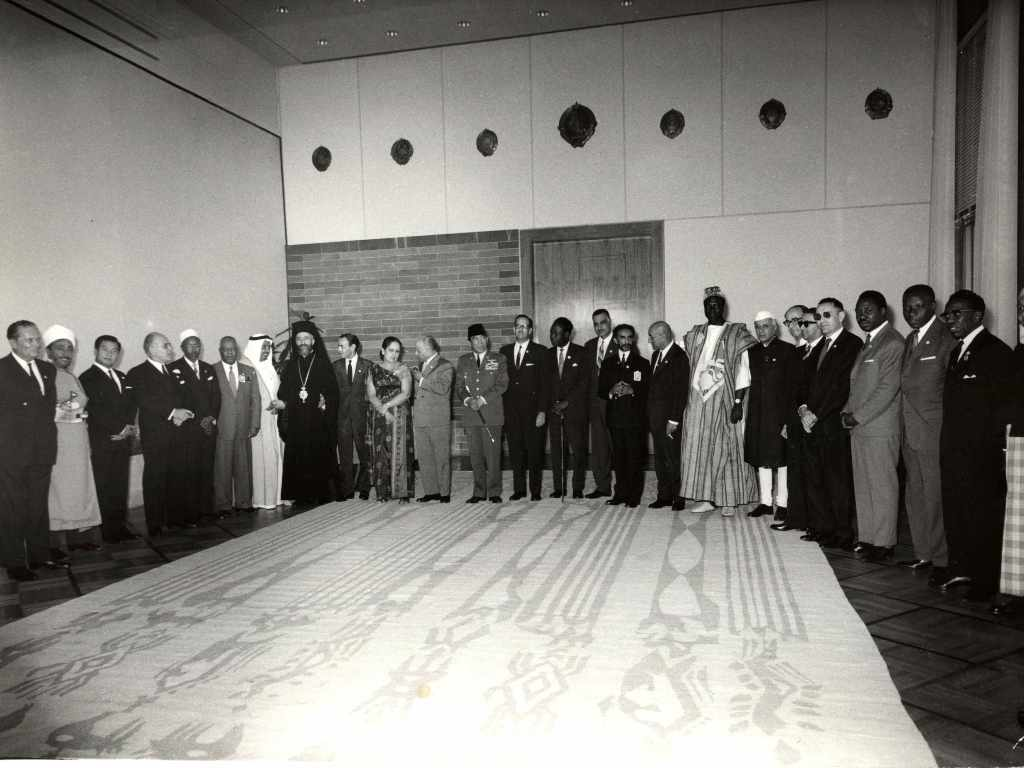
Leaders' group photo

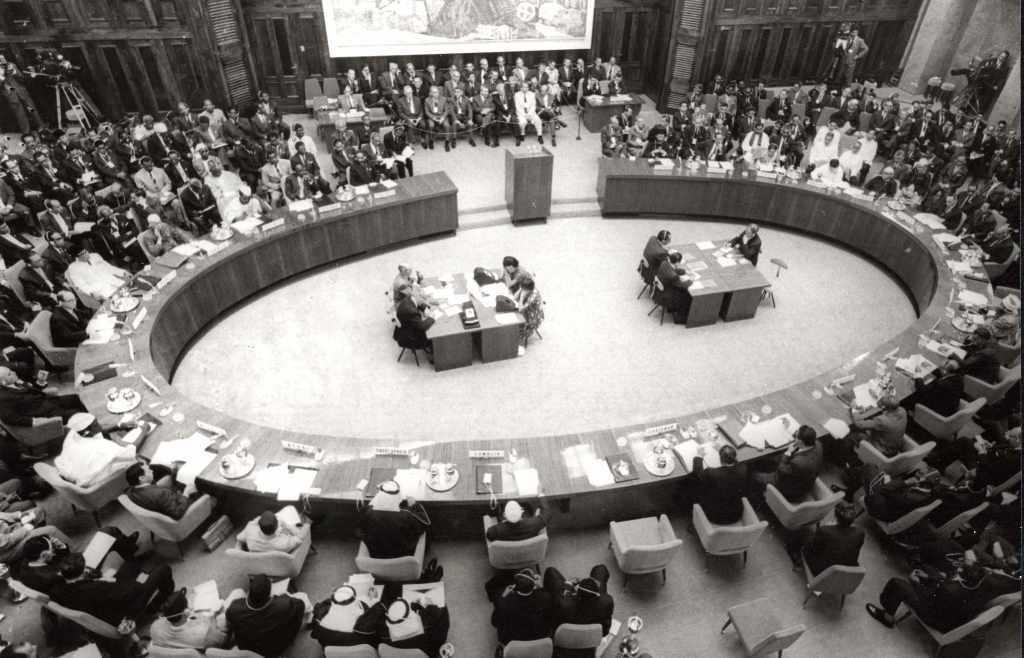
The venue of the Conference

=== The 1979 Non-Aligned Conference in Havana, Cuba ===
At least as early as 1978 some more conservative NAM member states initiated campaign against Cuba's chairmanship. Yugoslavia rejected to argue for a change of venue but nevertheless criticized Cuba for facilitating new forms of bloc dependence in Africa and argued against what Belgrade perceived as communist hegemony or capitalist imperialism. Yugoslavia's rejection of the need to move the Summit from Havana over the fear of divisiveness of such a move decisively calmed down those voices. Nevertheless, President of Yugoslavia Tito, who was the sole surviving founder of NAM at the time, launched a diplomatic campaign to keep the movement independent of both blocs. Yugoslavia wanted to preserve its hard-won independence from the Soviet Union and to prevent some Arab countries in their effort to deprive Egypt of its nonaligned status after the peace deal with Israel. Soviet Union accused Yugoslavia of conducting an unjustified campaign against Cuba and Vietnam. While Fidel Castro and Josip Broz Tito presented sharply different visions of the NAM both openly allowed for differing views and stressed the need of unity.

=== The 1989 Non-Aligned Conference in Belgrade ===
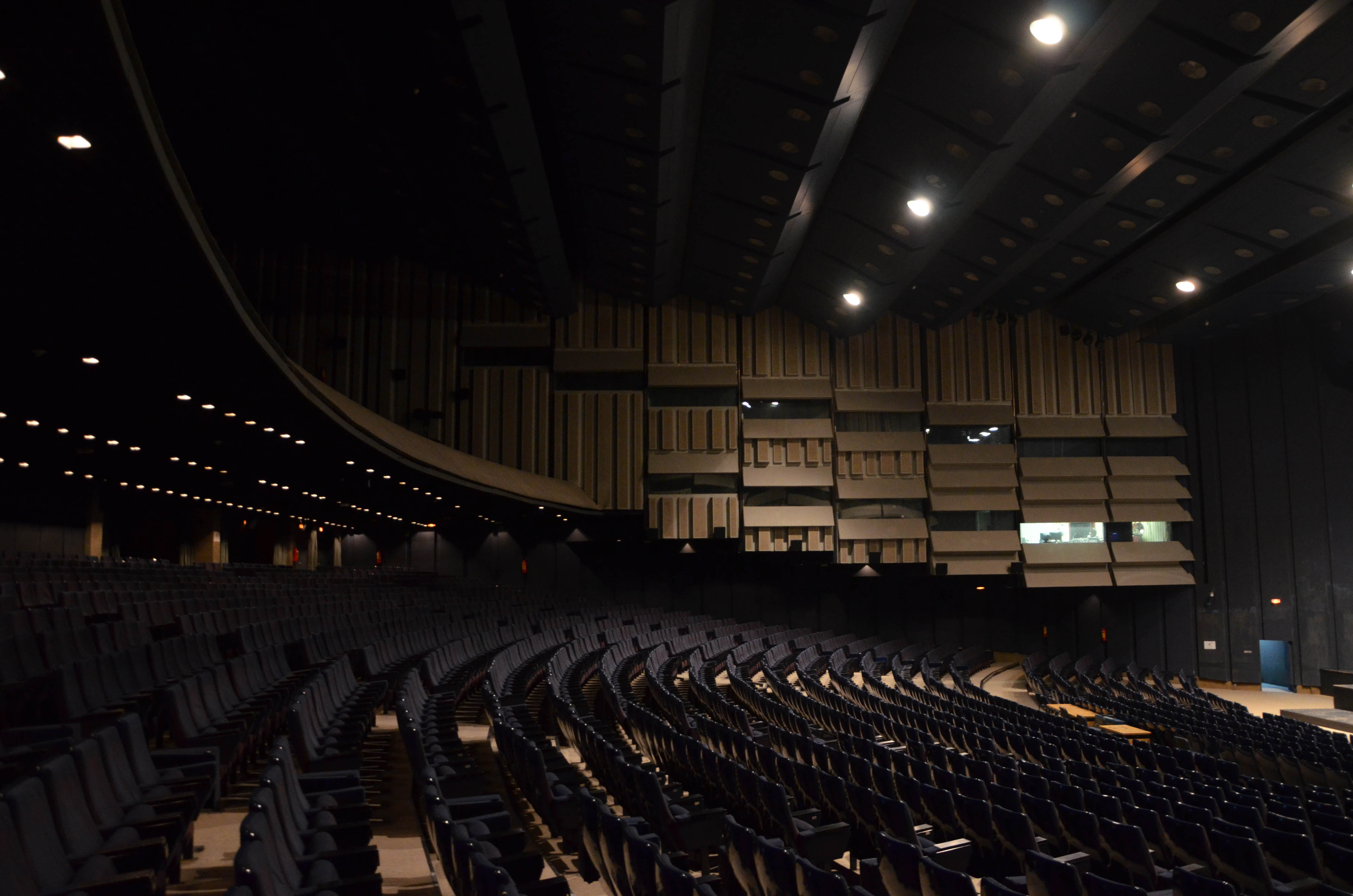
The Plenary Hall of the Sava Centar, venue of the 1989 conference.

In an effort to rebuild internal cohesion via success in the foreign policies Post-Tito, Yugoslavia attempted to host prominent events and participate in a number of multilateral initiatives. One of them was a successful bid to host the 1989 Non-Aligned Conference in Belgrade after the city hosted the first conference in 1961. The initiative was pushed by the new Yugoslav foreign minister from the Socialist Republic of Croatia and future 1993-1996 UN Secretary General's Special Advisor on the NAM Budimir Lončar. It was expected that the new host would come from Latin America but at the time Nicaragua, which was the only Latin American country strongly lobbying to host the event, was not the preferred choice among a significant number of the member states.

=== Breakup of Yugoslavia ===
Animated series of maps showing the Breakup of the Socialist Federal Republic of Yugoslavia

At the time of the Breakup of Yugoslavia in the early 1990s, the Socialist Federal Republic of Yugoslavia was at the end of its 1989-1992 chairmanship of the movement and was about to transfer its chairmanship to Indonesia. With five chairpersons in total, the rotation of the NAM chairpersons following the 1989 Belgrade Conference was the most dynamic in the history of the movement. The Yugoslav crisis created logistical and legal issues in the smooth transfer to Indonesian chairmanship. At the time of the September 1–6, 1992 conference in Jakarta, the Yugoslav Wars had begun. Former Yugoslav republics of Croatia, Slovenia and Bosnia-Herzegovina joined the United Nations as new member states while UN imposed sanctions against Yugoslavia. At the time, the new state of the Federal Republic of Yugoslavia (consisting of Serbia and Montenegro) claimed to be the sole legal successor of the Socialist Yugoslavia (which had been rejected in the United Nations Security Council Resolution 777 a couple of days following the Jakarta conference). The Yugoslav Crisis created an unprecedented situation in which the chairperson of the movement (Dobrica Ćosić who was in London at the time) was absent from the conference to transfer the chairmanship to Indonesia. The Yugoslav delegation, which was without specific instructions from Belgrade, was led by Montenegrin diplomat Branko Lukovac. In the absence of clear direction, the Yugoslav delegation agreed that the new post-Yugoslav states could participate in the meeting with the status of observers despite the fact that Belgrade did not recognize them at the time. In the partially chaotic circumstances, the Yugoslav delegation (de facto Serbian and Montenegrin delegation) managed to achieve results which the Minister of Foreign Affairs of Egypt, Amr Moussa, described as good for Yugoslavia and better than what should be expected from the United Nations. The movement decided not to expel Yugoslavia from the movement. Instead, to leave the Yugoslav nametag and the empty chair, which was kept until the beginning of the XXI century when, after the overthrow of Slobodan Milošević, the Federal Republic of Yugoslavia dropped its claim on sole succession of the Socialist Yugoslavia. The Federal Republic of Yugoslavia was not to be invited to conferences except if Yugoslav issues were discussed. The last Yugoslav delegation was even faced with the logistical issue of how to return home due to sanctions. They were finally able to fly to Budapest where they boarded a bus for the return to Yugoslavia, the country which was never again present at the NAM conference.

== Ideology ==
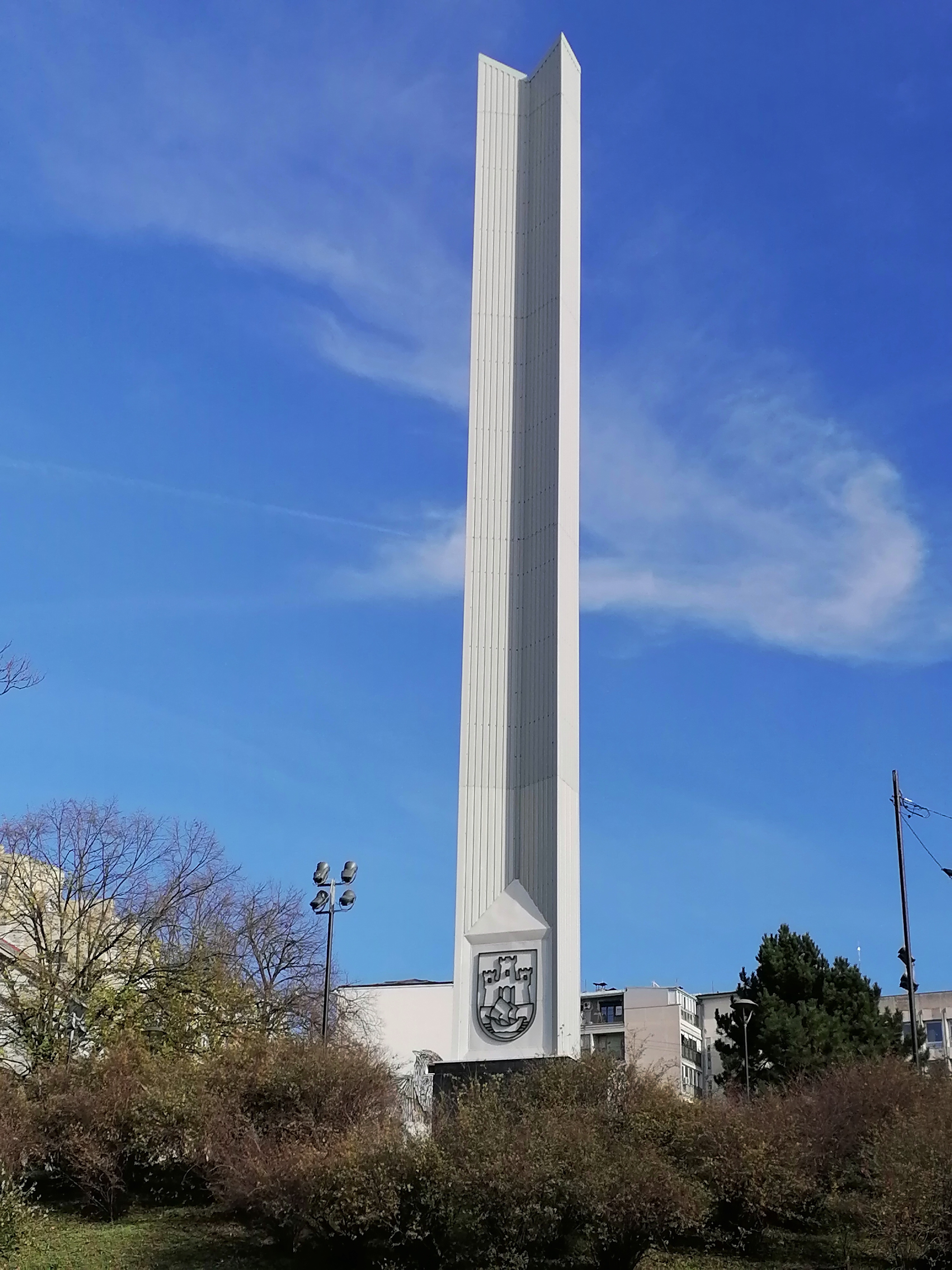
1961 Conference Commemorative Obelisk in Belgrade

=== Movement's core members ===
Yugoslavia was the proponent of equidistance towards both blocs during the Cold War and implicitly questioned the non-alignment of some of the movement's members. The country was the major advocate among the member states for moderate approach to numerous issues always highlighting the importance of non-attachment to superpower-led alliances.

Belgrade feared that the close Soviet ally Cuba, together with other self-described progressive members such as Vietnam, South Yemen, Ethiopia and Angola were trying to link the movement to the Eastern Bloc on the basis of Lenin's thesis of the natural identity of interest between Soviet socialism and the independence struggle of colonial peoples in Africa and Asia. In late 1970, it was the time for Latin America to host the Conference for the first time, as it had already been organized once in Europe, once in Asia and three times in Africa. Peru is said to have been the first tentative choice for the meeting but this idea was cancelled after the overthrow of the president Velasco Alvarado. Yugoslavia, together with India, proposed a large number of amendments in a successful effort to change what they saw as unacceptably one-sided pro-Soviet draft of the final declaration of the Havana Conference. Cuba, Iran, and Iraq, all of which were perceived to belong to the more radical wing of the movement, were absent from the 1989 Belgrade Conference which led to adoption of the more equidistant final document.

=== European and Mediterranean element of non-alignment ===
Twenty-five delegations participated at the First Non-Aligned Summit in Belgrade which included Yugoslavia, Cyprus, Algeria, United Arab Republic, Lebanon, Morocco and Tunisia from Europe or the Mediterranean region. Yugoslav diplomacy showed a certain mistrust of exclusive Asian–African and Tricontinental initiatives which Belgrade perceived as an effort by Soviets and self-described progressive nations to undermine and obscure the Yugoslav and Mediterranean place within the movement of non-Bloc nations.

Yugoslavia cooperated with other non-aligned and neutral countries in Europe within the Conference on Security and Co-operation in Europe (CSCE) in trying to preserve results of the Helsinki Accords. In this framework Yugoslavia cooperated with Austria and Finland on mediation between blocs, organized second CSCE summit in 1977 in Belgrade and proposed drafts on national minorities protection which are still valid and integral part of OSCE provisions on minority rights. Yugoslav foreign minister Miloš Minić stated that "Yugoslavia is a European, Mediterranean, non-aligned and developing country". During his international trips to other non-aligned countries president Tito underlined the need for the Mediterranean to become a zone of peace.

Due to its perceived Eurocentrism, Yugoslavia was sometimes criticized of excessively cautious support to decolonization liberation movements with Belgrade's provision of significant material and logistic support only in the case of the National Liberation Front of Algeria. With the exception of Algeria Yugoslavia focused its support on activities on the Special Committee on Decolonization where it was one of 17 original members and where its representative Miša Pavićević urged the committee to make a recommendation to the General Assembly that would push United Kingdom to give priority in granting independence to its colonies. The country argued that its own historical experiences of foreign domination by Austro-Hungarian and Ottoman empire, challenges in development and complex multi-ethnic federalist structure are akin to experiences of newly independent post-colonial countries.

== Cultural and scientific cooperation ==
=== Media ===
Non-Aligned News Agencies Pool, the predecessor of the NAM News Network, was established in January 1975 when the Yugoslav Agency Tanjug initiated publication of stories from other countries in English, French and Spanish.

=== Local authorities ===
While in practice Yugoslav municipalities engaged in foreign policy cooperation since the 1950s, they gained constitutionally protected right to engage in foreign affairs with the enactment of the 1974 Yugoslav Constitution which was almost two decades prior to similar provisions in some western countries such as Belgium. During the 1957 IULA congress in The Hague Yugoslav representatives sided with representatives from Africa and Asia who argued against the practice in which the outgoing executive committee was nominating its successors which effectively ensured dominance by the Global North. During the 1959 Yugoslav representatives invited the All-Indian Federation of Local Authorities to visit Yugoslavia. By the end of 1969, 60 cities from Yugoslavia had already established formal relations with 150 cities from 20 countries. Standing Conference of Towns of Yugoslavia actively promoted cooperation with non-aligned nations both domestically and in international context. The country's municipal umbrella organization was in the unique position to actively participate both in work of the International Union of Local Authorities and the Fédération mondiale des villes jumelées—United Towns Organisation where it advocated for East-West and North-South local cooperation. By 1977 out of 16 agreements with Third World local governments, 8 were established by municipalities from Serbia, 5 from Croatia, and 1 each from Slovenia, Bosnia and Herzegovina, and Macedonia. By 1982 Yugoslav municipalities established 33 agreements with municipalities in non-aligned and developing states 22 of which were established by municipalities from Serbia, 5 from Croatia, 4 from Slovenia and 1 each from Bosnia and Herzegovina and Macedonia. At the time Yugoslav municipalities established 343 agreements in total with Croatia (86 agreements) and Slovenia (81 agreement) leading and with 154 agreements with municipalities in neighboring countries. In general, a large majority of all agreements were established by municipalities from only three republics of Serbia, Croatia and Slovenia with municipalities in Serbia leading the way in cooperation with the non-aligned world.

== Economic cooperation ==
Notable Yugoslav projects in Non-Aligned countries

- Babylon Rotana Baghdad Hotel (Baghdad, Iraq) (1969–1982)
- Umm Qasr Port (Umm Qasr, Iraq)
- Weapons factory (Yusufiyah, Iraq)
- Entebbe International Airport (Entebbe, Uganda) (1975)
- FINDECO House (Lusaka, Zambia)
- International Conference Center at Serena Hotel (Kampala, Uganda) (1975)
- Lagos International Trade Fair (Lagos, Nigeria) (1974–1977)
- Old Nigerian Parliament House Building (Lagos, Nigeria)
- Ministry of Works and Communications of Ethiopia employed Branko Petrović as the lead architect for its headquarters. (Addis Ababa, Ethiopia)
- Kwame Nkrumah University of Science and Technology campus employed Miro Marasović as the lead architect. (Kabwe, Zambia)
- National Museum of Aleppo (Aleppo, Syria)
- Partially implement General urbanisation plan of Conakry (Conakry, Guinea) (1961–1963)
- Military Navy Port and residential area (Al-Khums, Libya)
- Kirirom 1 Hydropower Dam (Kirirom National Park, Cambodia)
- Yekatit 12 monument (Addis Ababa, Ethiopia)

== Post-breakup developments ==
After the end of the Cold War and Yugoslav Wars during the breakup of Yugoslavia, its six successor states showed various levels of interest in participation in the Non-Aligned Movement, with four of the six (Bosnia and Herzegovina, Croatia, Montenegro and Serbia) presently recognized as observer states of NAM. Neither of them is a full member state of NAM with Bosnia and Herzegovina's application being refused in 1995. Federal Republic of Yugoslavia (Serbia and Montenegro), one of the five immediate successor states to the former SFR Yugoslavia, asserted itself as the sole legal successor entitled to automatic memberships in international organisations and agreements of SFR Yugoslavia. This claim was disputed in its exclusivity by UNSCR 777 and suspended in 1992 without official removal from membership. In 2001 at the Coordination Bureau and subsequent Ministerial Meeting that same year FR Yugoslavia (Serbia and Montenegro) was recognized as an observer state of NAM. FR Yugoslavia was renamed Serbia and Montenegro in 2003 and itself broke up in 2006, with Montenegro and Serbia retaining their observer status each.

As of 2023, Croatia, Montenegro, North Macedonia and Slovenia are all member states of NATO, Bosnia and Herzegovina is a recognized candidate while Serbia asserts itself as a militarily neutral state. Croatia and Slovenia are member states of the European Union and the rest are official candidates. Earlier European NAM member states left the group once they joined EU (Cyprus and Malta). In addition to six Yugoslav republics, since 2008 province of Kosovo declared unilateral independence. As of 2023 the vast majority of NAM member states did not recognize Kosovo including some of the largest member states such as India, Indonesia, Cuba, South Africa, etc. yet there is no common stance within the NAM on the Kosovo independence precedent.

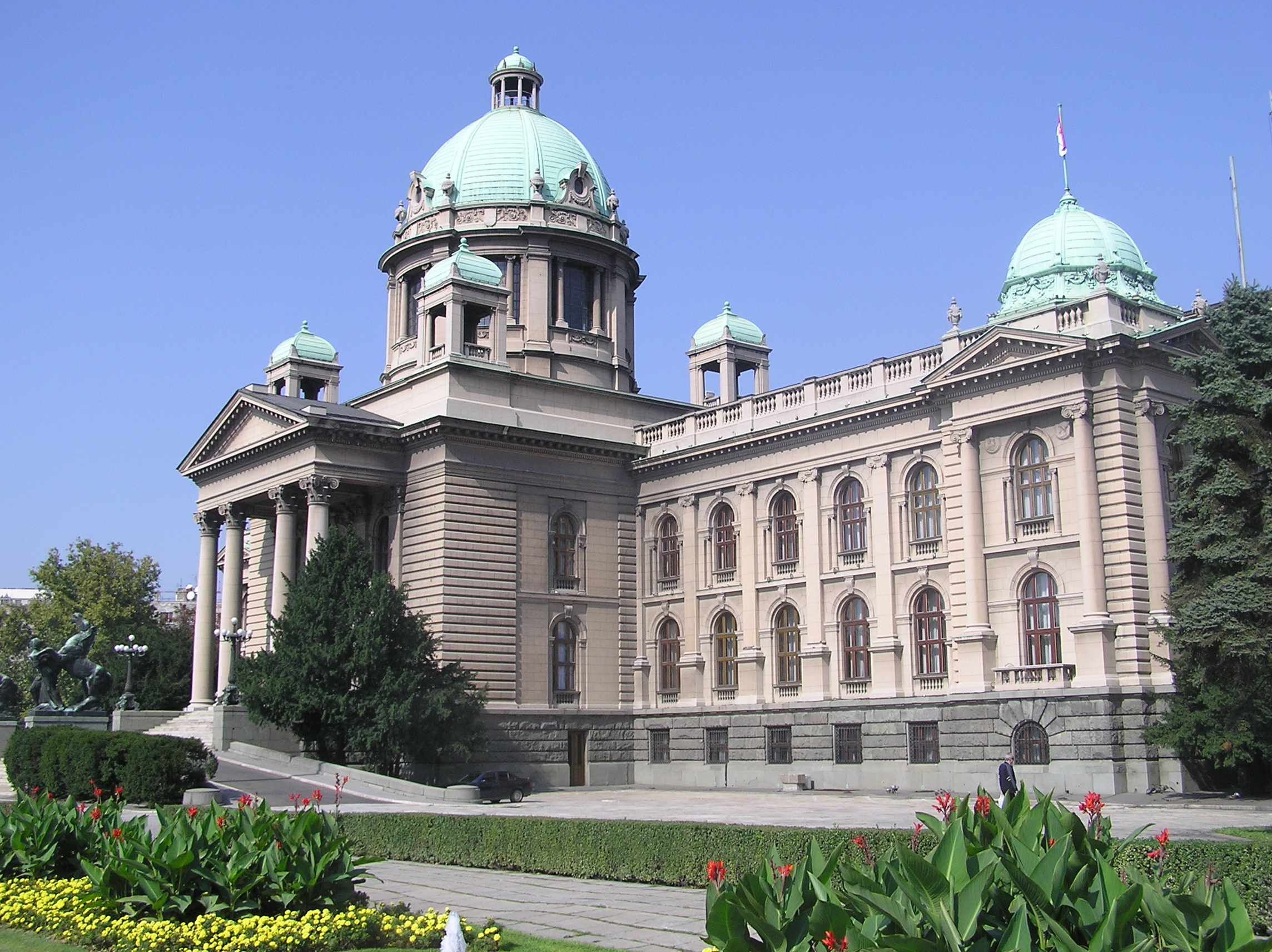
House of the National Assembly of the Republic of Serbia was the venue of the 2011 and previous conferences.

- Serbia: In 2010, for the first time after the end of Yugoslav Wars, Serbia initiated a scholarship program called "World in Serbia - 100 Scholarships for Students from Non-Aligned Movement Member States". On 5–6 September 2011 the Non-Aligned Movement celebrated its 50th anniversary in Belgrade in the House of the National Assembly of the Republic of Serbia which hosted the first NAM conference. 106 delegations confirmed their participation in the 2011 Belgrade NAM Conference. United Nations Secretary-General's message to Additional Commemorative Meeting of the Non-Aligned Movement was delivered by Kassym-Jomart Tokayev. The idea for meeting was proposed by the President of Serbia Boris Tadić during his participation at 15th conference in Sharm el-Sheikh. Serbian Minister of Foreign Affairs Ivica Dačić participated in 17th Conference on the Margarita Island in Venezuela. Ivica Dačić had also participated in the 2018 ministerial conference in Azerbaijan, where he stated that the Non-Aligned Movement is of the highest importance for Serbia given the cherished legacy of the former Yugoslavia and its President Tito. Dačić expressed regret that his country was only an observer state but at the same time was hopeful for more significant engagement in the future.

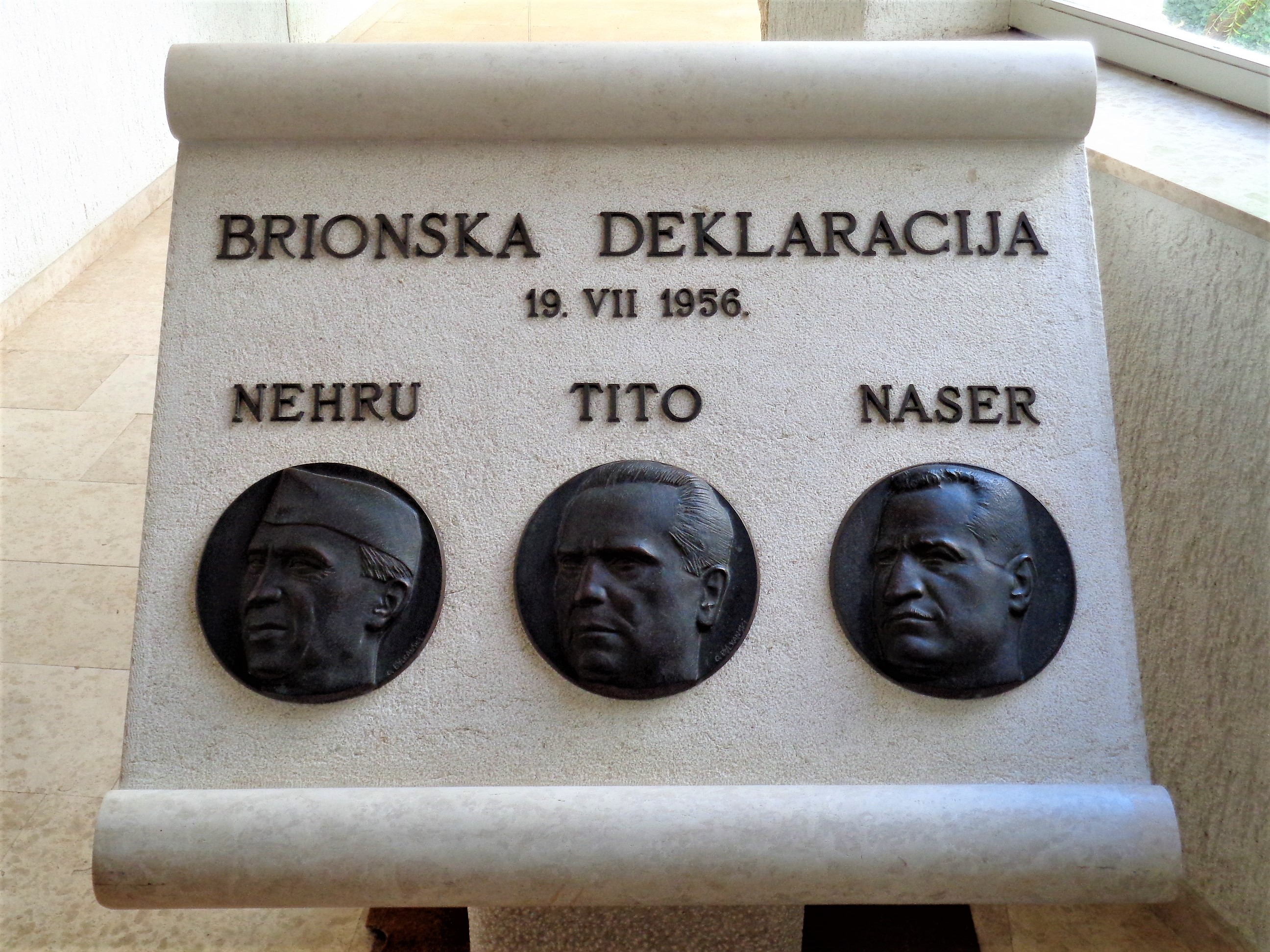
Memorial stone plaque dedicated to Brijuni Declaration in the Brijuni Museums, Brijuni Islands.

- Croatia: Deputy Foreign Minister Ivan Šimonović led the observers delegation of Croatia at the 2003 Summit in Kuala Lumpur with Foreign Minister Miomir Žužul attending the following 14th Ministerial Conference of the Non-aligned Movement in Durban in 2004 and Minister Kolinda Grabar-Kitarović attending the 2005 Annual Meeting of the Non-Aligned Movement’s foreign ministers in New York City. Croatian president Stjepan Mesić participated in NAM conferences in Havana in 2006 and Sharm el-Sheikh in 2009. President's Office cooperation with NAM member states was facilitated by Budimir Lončar, diplomat with extensive experience from the Ministry of Foreign Affairs of Yugoslavia. Croatian election to the Eastern European Spot for non-permanent member of the United Nations Security Council in 2008–2009 (in open competition with Czech Republic which was member state both of EU and NATO) was ascribed to president's and Croatian Ministry's successful lobbying within the Non-Aligned Movement. Between 27 and 29 September 2021 the Drugo more (The Other Sea) organized the Mine, Yours, Ours: the Non-Aligned conference with participation of Vijay Prashad, Sara Salem, Budimir Lončar and Tvrtko Jakovina as the keynote speakers and with subsequent exhibition Southern Constellations: Poetics of the Non-Aligned lasting from 24 September till 15 October 2021.

== See also ==
- Yugoslavia and the United Nations
- Yugoslavia and the European Economic Community
- Yugoslavia and the Organisation of African Unity
- India and the Non-Aligned Movement
- Egypt and the Non-Aligned Movement
- "Josip Broz Tito" Art Gallery of the Nonaligned Countries
- Informbiro period
- Titoism
- World War II in Yugoslavia
- Ministry of Foreign Affairs (Yugoslavia)
- Museum of Yugoslavia
- Museum of African Art, Belgrade
- Archives of Yugoslavia
- Diplomatic Archives of Serbia
- Park of Friendship, New Belgrade
- Breakup of Yugoslavia
- Institute of International Politics and Economics
- Foreign relations of Bosnia and Herzegovina
- Foreign relations of Croatia
- Foreign relations of Montenegro
- Foreign relations of North Macedonia
- Foreign relations of Serbia
- Foreign relations of Slovenia
