= Kirirom 1 Hydropower Dam =

- Location within Cambodia
- Official name: Kirirom 1 Hydropower Dam
- Country: Cambodia
- Location: in Kirirom National Park, Kirirom Plateau of Koh Kong Province, about 110km South-West of Phnom Penh
- Coordinates: 11°14′15.64″N 104°2′3.14″E
- Opening date: 1965; Partially destroyed in 1975; Recommissioned in 2002
- Owner: China Electric Power Technology Import & Export Corporation (CETIC)

Dam and spillways
- Type of dam: Earth core rockfill dam
- Height: 34 m (112 ft)
- Length: 343 m (1,125 ft)

Reservoir
- Creates: Kirirom 1 Hydropower Dam Reservoir

Power Station
- Operator: China Electric power Technology Import and Export Corporation (CETIC)
- Installed capacity: 12 MW (16,000 hp)

The Kirirom 1 Dam is an embankment dam located in the Kirirom National Park of Koh Kong Province, Cambodia

The project purpose is to supply of electricity to Electricité du Cambodge (EDC) (hereinafter referred to as "EDC") in accordance with the power purchase agreement signed between "Licensee" and "EDC" on 28 July 2000 Kirirom I (completed 1965; partially destroyed 1975; re-commissioned 2002)

The Kirirom I Hydro Power Plant was built in 1968 with support from Yugoslavia. In 1975, under the Khmer Rouge regime, the power plant fell into disrepair and electricity production stopped. In 1999, a Chinese State Owned Enterprise, China Electric Power Technology Import & Export Corporation (CETIC), was contracted to re-build the project at a cost of US$24 million under a 30-year build-operate-transfer (BOT) agreement. The Council for Development of Cambodia approved the project on 29 December 2000 and in May 2002 the project re-commenced operation, providing electricity to Kampong Speu Province and Phnom Penh. The project is managed by Electricity du Cambodge and is linked to Phnom Penh by a 120 km long, 115kV transmission line

== See also ==
- Mekong
