= Foreign relations of Yugoslavia =

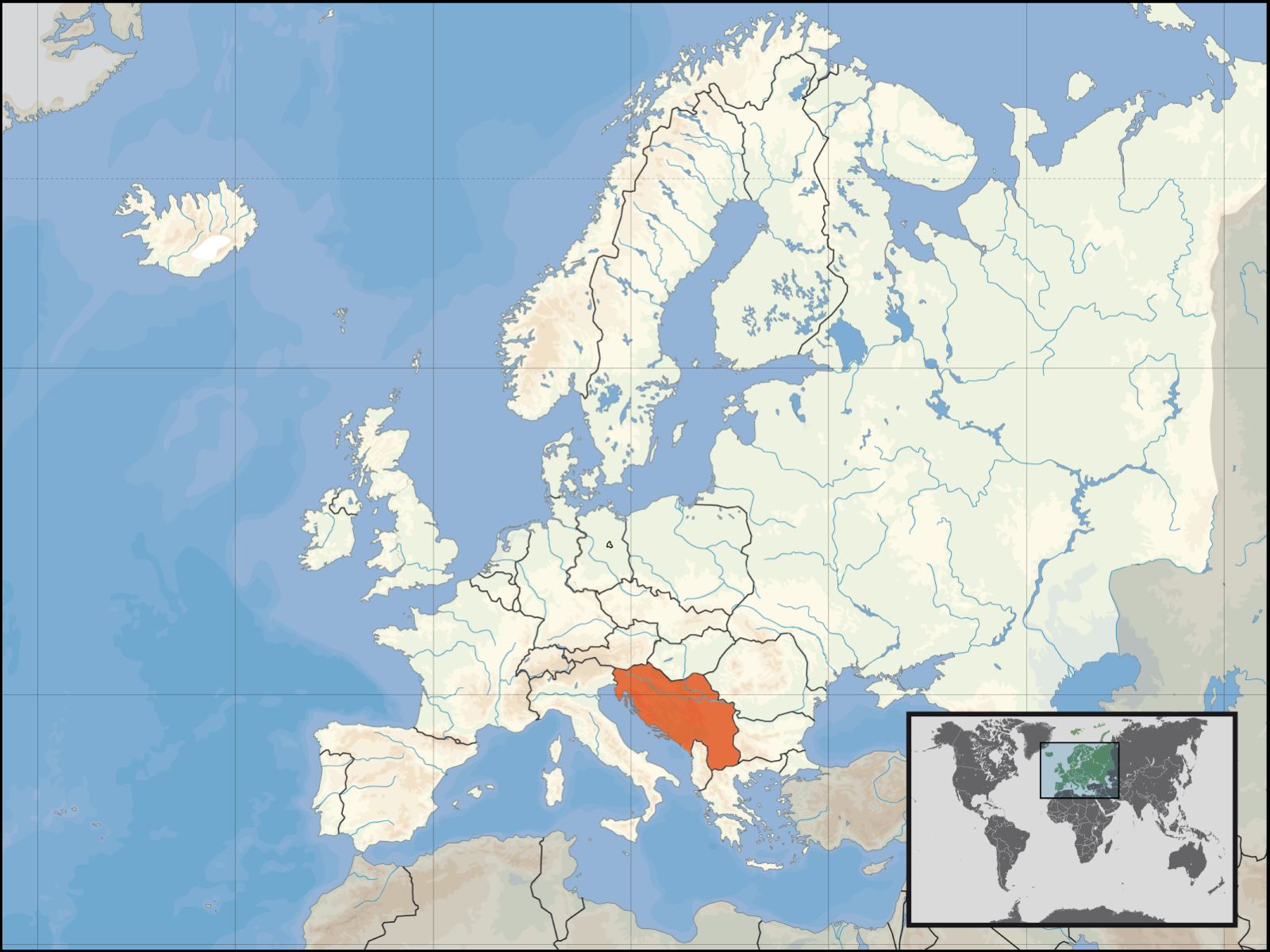
Map of Yugoslavia from 1945 until 1992

Foreign relations of Yugoslavia (Serbo-Croatian: Vanjski/Spoljni odnosi Jugoslavije, Вањски/Спољни односи Југославије; Slovene: Zunanji odnosi Jugoslavije; Macedonian: Надворешните односи на Југославија) were international relations of the interwar Kingdom of Yugoslavia and the Cold War Socialist Federal Republic of Yugoslavia. During its existence, the country was the founding member of numerous multilateral organizations including the United Nations, Non-Aligned Movement, International Monetary Fund, Group of 77, Group of 15, Central European Initiative and the European Broadcasting Union.

== History ==
=== Kingdom of Yugoslavia ===
The Kingdom of Yugoslavia, ruled by the Serbian Karađorđević dynasty, was formed in 1918 by the merger of the provisional State of Slovenes, Croats and Serbs (itself formed from territories of the former Austria-Hungary, encompassing Bosnia and Herzegovina and most of Croatia and Slovenia) and Banat, Bačka and Baranja (that had been part of the Kingdom of Hungary within Austria-Hungary) with the formerly independent Kingdom of Serbia. In the same year, the Kingdom of Montenegro also proclaimed its unification with Serbia, whereas the regions of Kosovo and Vardar Macedonia had become parts of Serbia prior to the unification. The first country in the world to officially recognize the new state was the United States. After the creation of Yugoslavia the newly formed state was a status quo state in Europe which was opposed to revisionist states. In this situation the country prominently was a part of the Little Entente and the first Balkan Pact. Yugoslav accession to the Tripartite Pact resulted in Yugoslav coup d'état and ultimately the Invasion of Yugoslavia.

=== World War II ===
During World War II, the country was formally represented by the Yugoslav government-in-exile while Yugoslav Partisans headed by Josip Broz Tito progressively gained support of the Allies. At the same time the Anti-Fascist Council for the National Liberation of Yugoslavia challenged the authority of the government in exile and among other issues proposed a review of country's international legal obligations with the aim of annulment or re-negotiation. The new foreign policy was based on the pre-war and war era foreign policy positions of the Communist Party of Yugoslavia which included support for the Soviet Union, Bavarian Soviet Republic, Hungarian Soviet Republic, Yugoslav support for the Spanish Republic, rejection of Anschluss and vocal support for Czechoslovakia’s independence after Munich Agreement. The new socialist Federal Executive Council of Josip Broz Tito was formed on 7 March 1945, recognized by United Kingdom on 20 March 1945, and the Soviet Union and the United States a week after that.

=== Socialist Yugoslavia ===
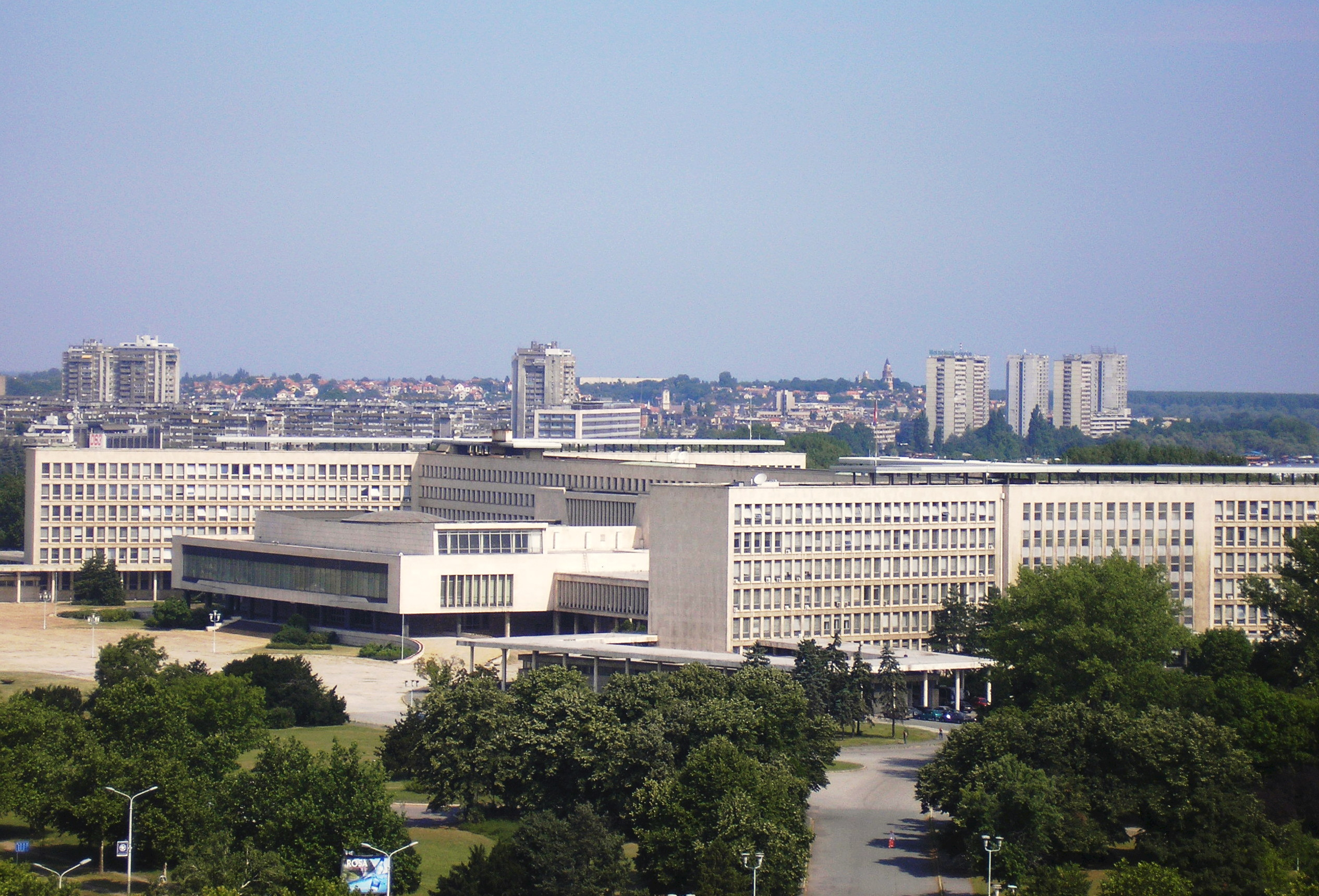
Federal Executive Council building in New Belgrade

During the first post-war years new Yugoslav state was closely aligned with the Soviet Union and involved into dispute over the Free Territory of Trieste and the Greek Civil War. In May 1945, 4,650 Greek refugees, mostly male members of ELAS, settled in the village of Maglić with the help of Yugoslav government. From 1945 to 1948, it was a sui generis case of Greek extraterritorial jurisdiction. This period was sharply ended in 1948 after the Tito–Stalin split.

Yugoslavia initially pursued development of relations among non-bloc neutral European states as a way to avoid isolation and preserve certain level of independence without alienating major powers. In this period Yugoslavia joined the Second Balkan Pact. Belgrade however perceived that in deeply divided Europe there was shrinking maneuvering space for neutral countries and followed the development of what will be called process of Finlandization with great concern. In 1956 the Belgrade declaration ended the period of significant dependence on the Western bloc. The Declaration guaranteed noninterference in Yugoslavia's internal affairs and legitimized right to different forms of socialist development in different countries. While the declaration failed in achieving lasting rapprochement between the two countries (result of the Yugoslav anxiety over the Hungarian Revolution of 1956) it had an effect on Yugoslav disengagement from the Balkan Pact with NATO member states of Turkey and Greece.

Yugoslavia subsequently discovered new allies among former colonies and mandate territories beyond Europe. Yugoslavia supported Nasserist Egypt during the Suez Crisis. Yugoslavia developed its relations with India beginning with the time of their concurrent mandate at the UN Security Council from the end of 1949 onward. Yugoslavia was one of the founding members of the Non-Aligned Movement which enabled this comparatively small and underdeveloped country to play one of the most prominent diplomatic role during the Cold War.

Yugoslav crisis which escalated into breakup of the country and Yugoslav Wars turned into one of the major policy and security issues in the first decade after the end of the Cold War.

==== Federal Secretaries of Foreign Affairs ====
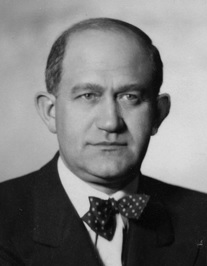
Stanoje Simić
(1 February 1946 – 31 August 1948)

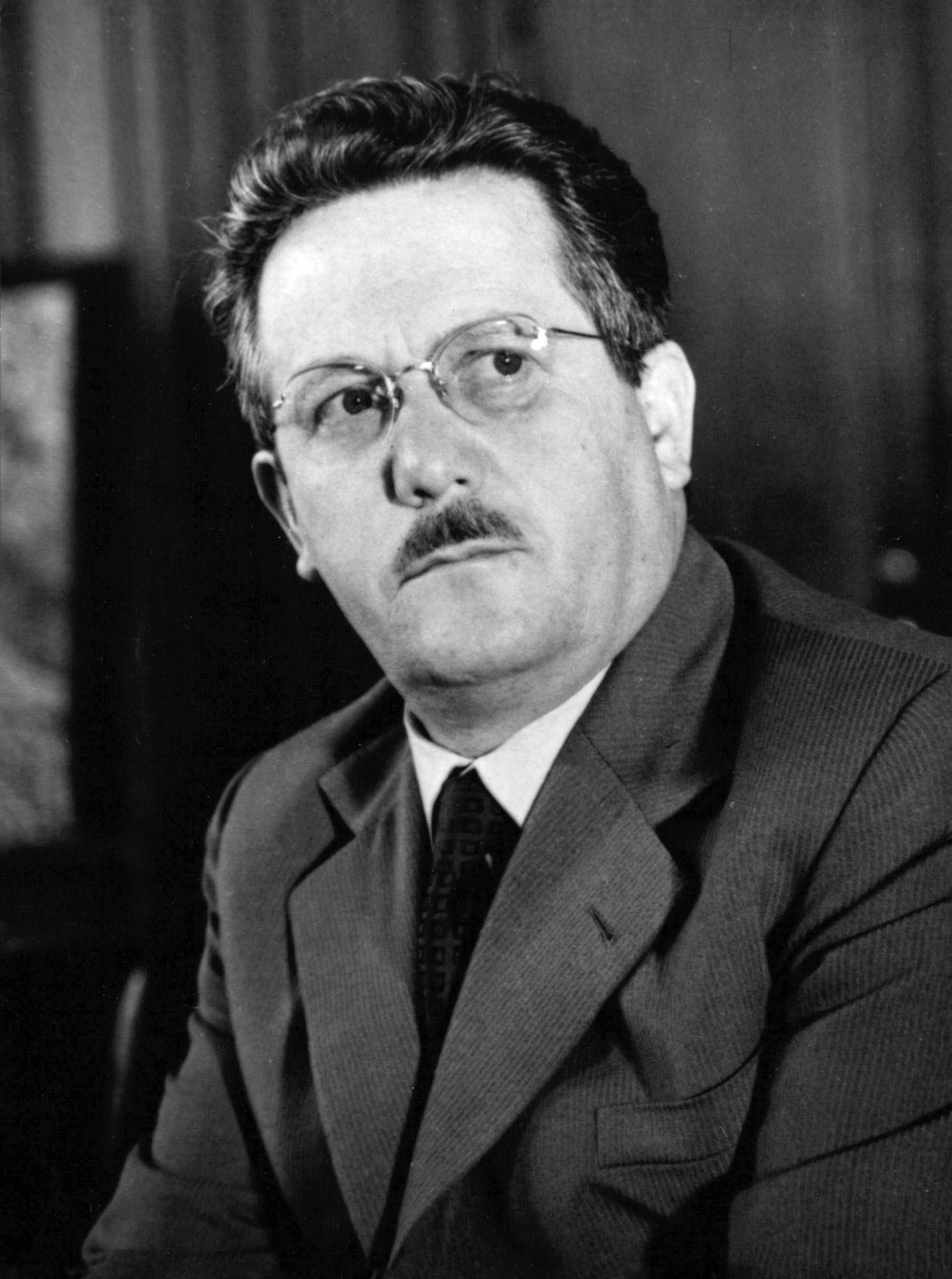
Edvard Kardelj
(31 August 1948 – 15 January 1953)

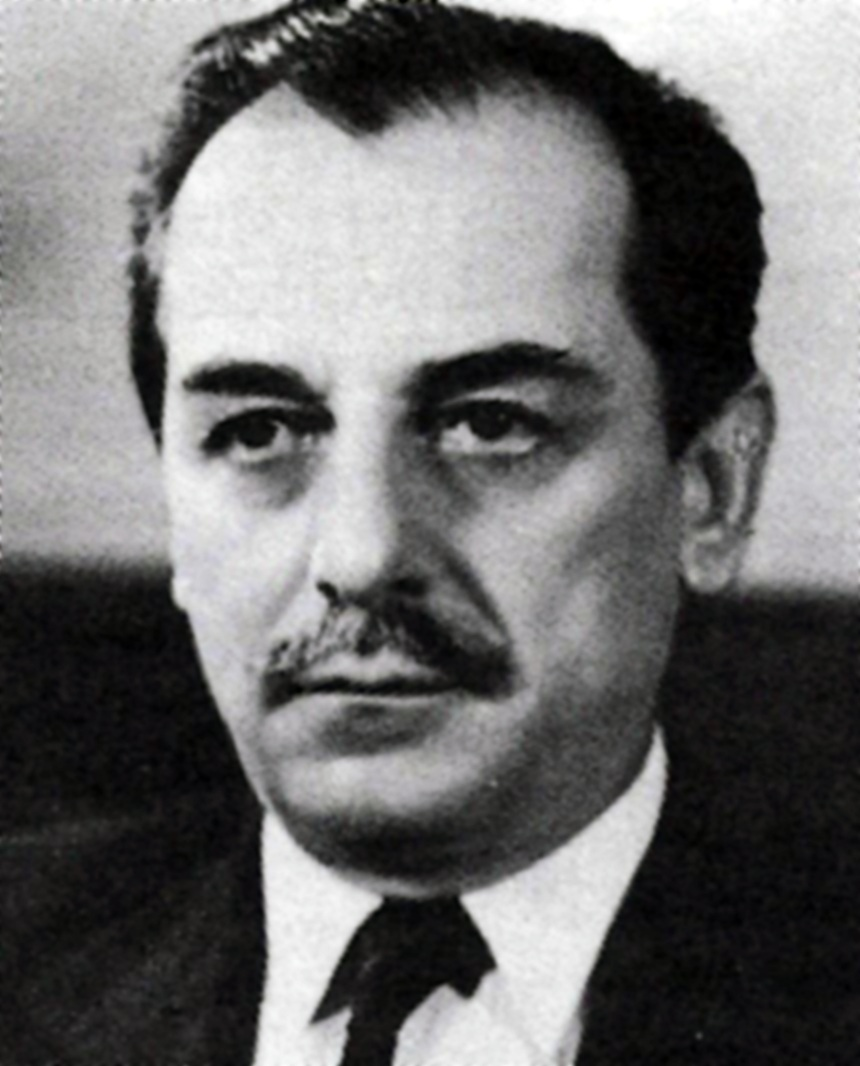
Koča Popović
(15 January 1953 – 23 April 1965)

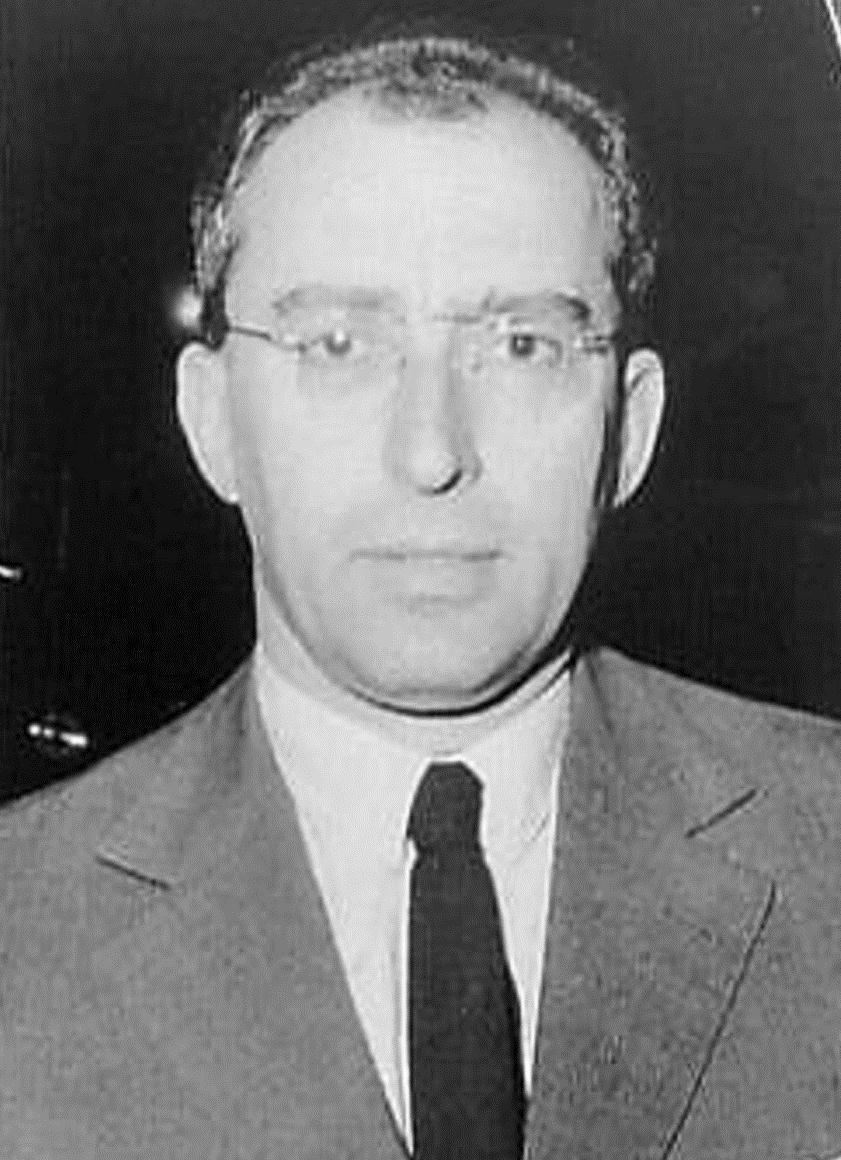
Marko Nikezić
(23 April 1965 – 25 December 1968)

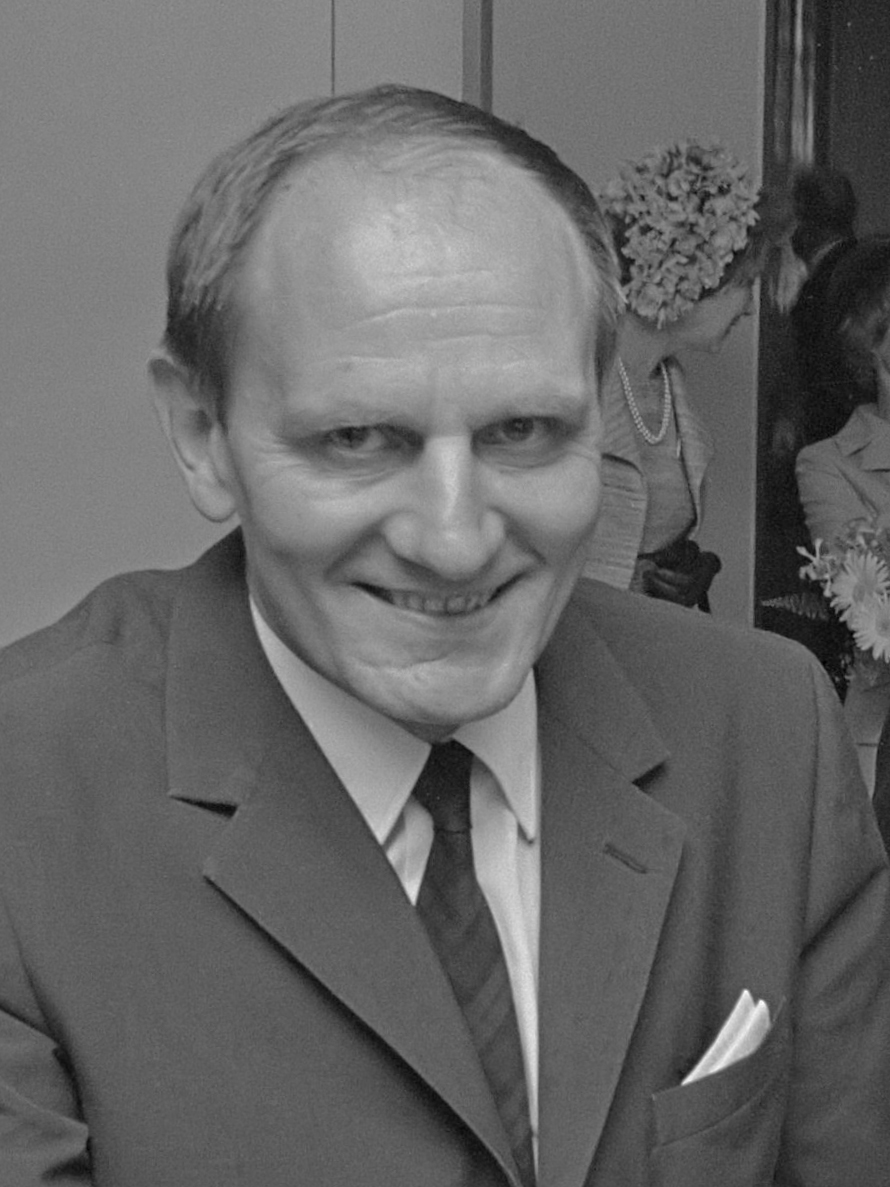
Mirko Tepavac
(25 April 1969 – 1 November 1972)

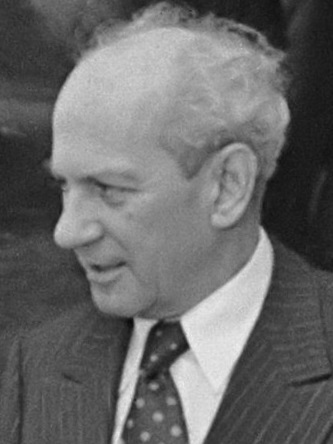
Miloš Minić
(16 December 1972 – 17 May 1978)

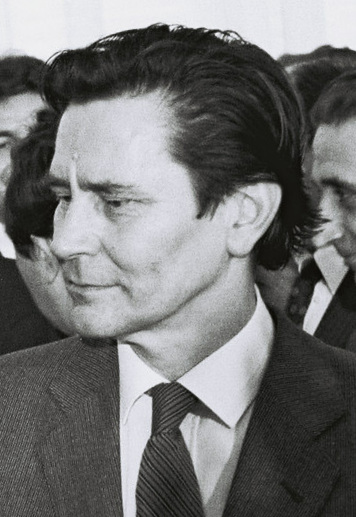
Josip Vrhovec
(17 May 1978 – 17 May 1982)

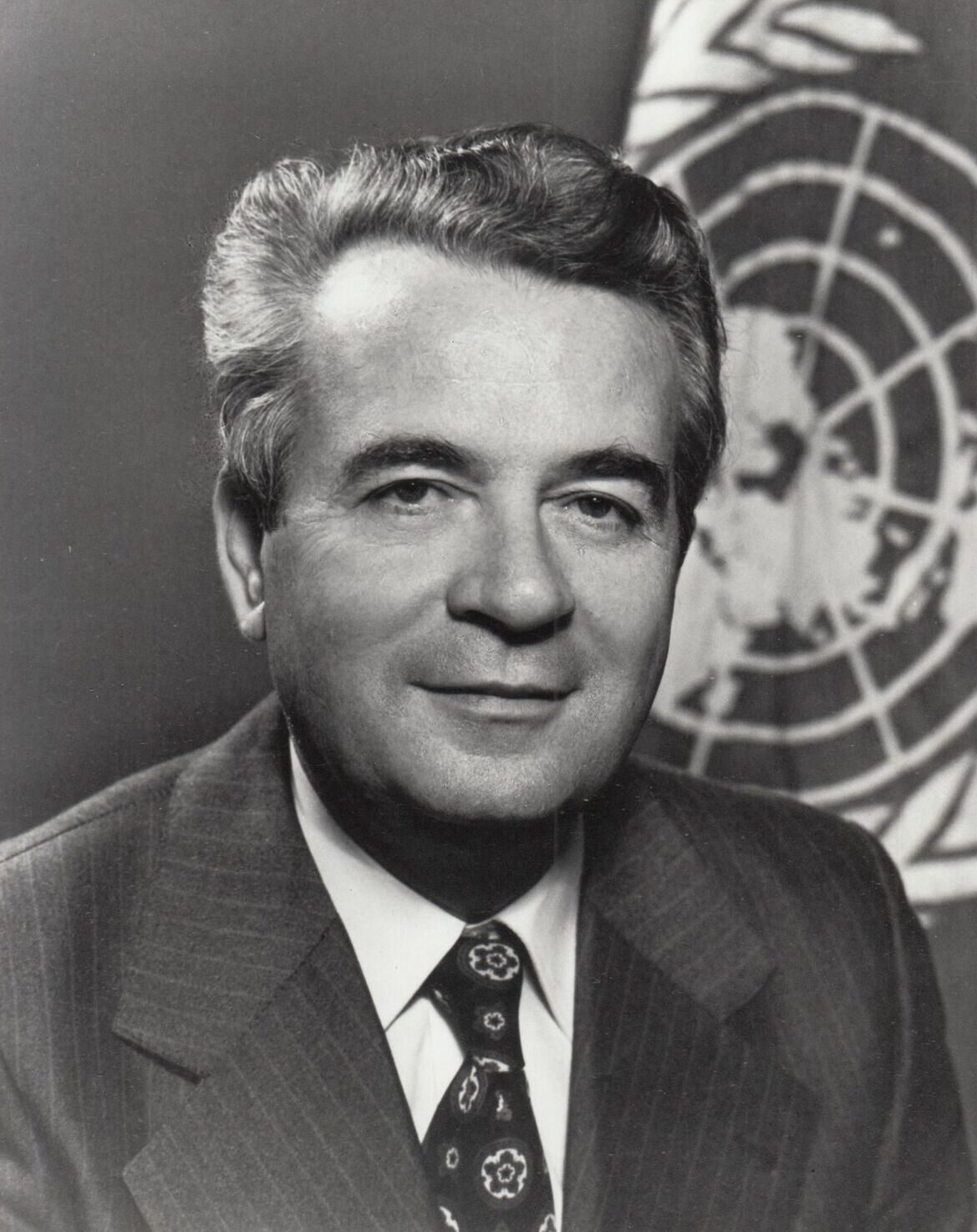
Lazar Mojsov
(17 May 1982 – 15 May 1984)

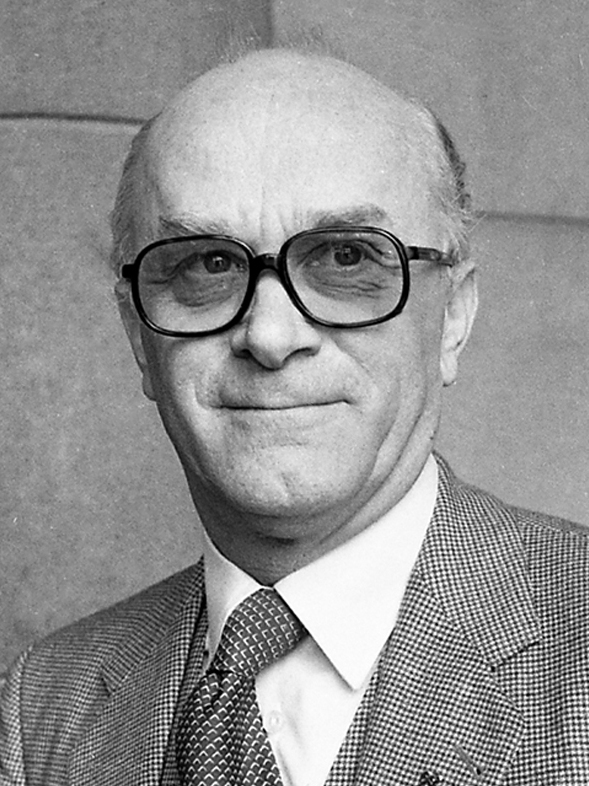
Raif Dizdarević
(15 May 1984 – 30 December 1987)

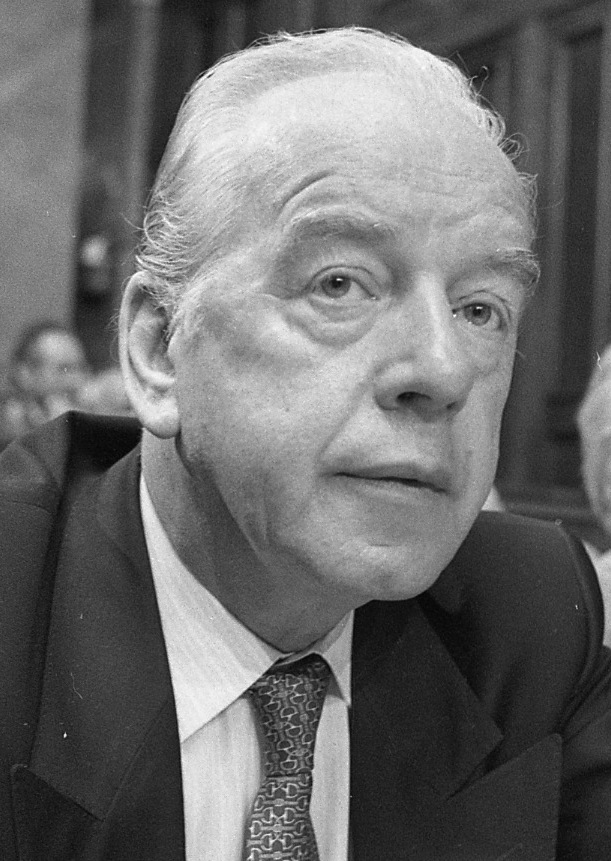
Budimir Lončar
(31 December 1987 – 12 December 1991)

== Foreign relations ==
=== Africa ===
Country	Independence	Formal Relations Began	Notes
Algeria	5 July 1962	2 July 1962	Main article: Algeria–Yugoslavia relations
Angola	11 November 1975	1975	Main article: Angola–Yugoslavia relations
Benin	1 August 1960	1962	
Botswana	30 September 1966	1970	
Burkina Faso	5 August 1960	1968	
Burundi	1 July 1962	1962	Main article: Burundi–Yugoslavia relations
Cameroon	1 January 1960	1960	
Cape Verde	5 July 1975	1975	Main article: Cape Verde–Yugoslavia relations
Central African Republic	13 August 1960	1960	
Chad	11 August 1960	1966	
Democratic Republic of the Congo	30 June 1960	1961	Main article: Democratic Republic of the Congo–Yugoslavia relations
Republic of the Congo	15 August 1960	1964	Main article: Republic of the Congo–Yugoslavia relations
Djibouti	27 June 1977	1978	
Egypt	28 February 1922	1 February 1908 (continued relations of the Kingdom of Serbia)	Main article: Egypt–Yugoslavia relations
Equatorial Guinea	12 October 1968	1970	
Ethiopia	never colonized in a classical sense (temporary Italian occupation)	1952	Main article: Ethiopia–Yugoslavia relations
Gabon	17 August 1960	1960	Main article: Gabon–Yugoslavia relations
Gambia	18 February 1965	1965	
Ghana	6 March 1957	1959	Main article: Ghana–Yugoslavia relations
Guinea	2 October 1958	1958	
Guinea-Bissau	10 September 1974	1975	
Ivory Coast	7 August 1960	1968	
Kenya	12/20 December 1963	1963	
Lesotho	4 October 1966	1972	
Liberia	26 July 1847	1959	
Libya	24 December 1951	1955	Main article: Libya–Yugoslavia relations
Madagascar	26 June 1960	1960	
Mali	22 September 1960	1961	
Mauritania	28 November 1960	1961	
Morocco	2 March 1956	2 March 1957	Main article: Morocco–Yugoslavia relations
Mauritius	12 March 1968	1969	
Mozambique	25 June 1975	1975	
Namibia	21 March 1990	1990	
Nigeria	1 October 1960	1960	Main article: Nigeria–Yugoslavia relations
Rwanda	1 July 1962	1971	
Sahrawi Arab Democratic Republic		28 November 1984	Main article: Sahrawi Arab Democratic Republic–Yugoslavia relations
Sao Tome and Principe	12 July 1975	1977	
Seychelles	29 June 1976	1977	Main article: Seychelles–Yugoslavia relations
Senegal	20 August 1960	1961	
Sierra Leone	27 April 1961	1961	Main article: Sierra Leone–Yugoslavia relations
Somalia	1 July 1960	1960	
Sudan	1 January 1956	1956	Main article: Sudan–Yugoslavia relations
Swaziland	6 September 1968	1968	
Tanzania	1961, 26 April 1964 (unification)	1961	Main article: Tanzania–Yugoslavia relations
Togo	27 April 1960	1960	
Tunisia	20 March 1956	1957	
Uganda	9 October 1962	1963	Main article: Uganda–Yugoslavia relations
Zambia	24 October 1964	1964	Main article: Yugoslavia–Zambia relations
Zimbabwe	18 April 1980	1980	Main article: Yugoslavia–Zimbabwe relations

=== Americas ===
Country	Formal Relations	Notes
Argentina	29 February 1928	
Bahamas		
Barbados		
Bolivia	1952	Main article: Bolivia–Yugoslavia relations
Brazil	1938	Main article: Brazil–Yugoslavia relations
Canada	9 February 1942	Main article: Canada–Yugoslavia relations
Chile	1935	
Colombia	1966	
Costa Rica	1952	
Cuba	1943	Main article: Cuba–Yugoslavia relations
Dominica		
Dominican Republic	1 March 1912 (continued relations of the Kingdom of Serbia)	
Ecuador	1956	
El Salvador	1956	
Grenada	29 June 1978	
Guatemala	1882 (continued relations of the Kingdom of Serbia)	
Guyana	5 November 1968	Main article: Guyana–Yugoslavia relations
Haiti	1956	
Honduras	1904 (continued relations of the Kingdom of Serbia)	
Jamaica	October 1968	Main article: Jamaica–Yugoslavia relations
Mexico	24 May 1946	Main article: Mexico–Yugoslavia relations
Nicaragua	23 February 1904 (continued relations of the Kingdom of Serbia)	Main article: Nicaragua–Yugoslavia relations
Panama	1953	
Paraguay	1950	
Peru	1942	Main article: Peru–Yugoslavia relations Both countries established diplomatic relations in October 1942, and renewed them in 1968. An embassy was opened in Belgrade that same year, with the first Peruvian Ambassador arriving in 1969.
Suriname	9 July 1976	
Trinidad and Tobago	1965	Main article: Trinidad and Tobago–Yugoslavia relations
Uruguay	1950	
United States		Main article: United States–Yugoslavia relations
Venezuela	1951	Main article: Venezuela–Yugoslavia relations

=== Asia-Pacific ===
Country	Formal Relations Began	Notes
Afghanistan	30 December 1954	Main article: Afghanistan–Yugoslavia relations
Australia	1966	Main article: Australia–Yugoslavia relations
Bangladesh	20 November 1956	
Burma	29 December 1950	Main article: Burma–Yugoslavia relations
Cambodia	15 July 1956	Main article: Cambodia–Yugoslavia relations
China	2 January 1955	Main article: China–Yugoslavia relations
Fiji	1976	
India	5 December 1948	Main article: India–Yugoslavia relations
Indonesia	1954	Main article: Indonesia–Yugoslavia relations
Iran	1945	Main article: Iran–Yugoslavia relations
Iraq	1958	Main article: Iraq–Yugoslavia relations
Israel	19 May 1948 (Note: Formal relations were cut in 1967 following the Six-Day War)	Main article: Israel–Yugoslavia relations
Japan		Main article: Japan–Yugoslavia relations
Jordan	1951	
Kuwait	7 May 1963	
Laos	25 November 1962	
Lebanon	1946	Main article: Lebanon–Yugoslavia relations
Malaysia	1967	
Maldives		
Mongolia	20 November 1956	Main article: Mongolia–Yugoslavia relations
Nepal	7 October 1959	
New Zealand	1951	
North Korea	30 October 1948	Main article: North Korea–Yugoslavia relations
Oman	1974	
Palestine	1989 (Note: Yugoslavia recognised Palestine on 16 November 1988)	
Pakistan	18 May 1948	Main article: Pakistan–Yugoslavia relations
Philippines	1972	
Saudi Arabia	N/a	Saudi Arabia and Yugoslavia did not have diplomatic relations.
Singapore	22 August 1967	
South Korea	27 December 1982	
Sri Lanka	14 October 1957	Main article: Sri Lanka–Yugoslavia relations
Syria	1946	
Thailand	1954	
Turkey		Main article: Turkey–Yugoslavia relations
Vietnam	10 March 1957	Main article: Vietnam–Yugoslavia relations
Yemen	1957	

=== Europe ===
Country	Formal Relations Began	Notes
Albania		Main article: Albania–Yugoslavia relations
Austria		Main article: Austria–Yugoslavia relations
Belgium		Main article: Belgium–Yugoslavia relations
Bulgaria		Main article: Bulgaria–Yugoslavia relations
Cyprus	10 July 1960	Main article: Cyprus–Yugoslavia relations
Czechoslovakia	1918	Main article: Czechoslovakia–Yugoslavia relations
Denmark	1917 (continued relations of the Kingdom of Serbia)	
Estonia		
Finland	1928	Main article: Finland–Yugoslavia relations
France		Main article: France–Yugoslavia relations
Germany		Main article: Germany–Yugoslavia relations
East Germany	15 October 1957	Main article: East Germany–Yugoslavia relations
Greece		Main article: Greece–Yugoslavia relations
Holy See	1920 (Note: Concordat signed in 1914)	Main article: Holy See–Yugoslavia relations
Hungary		Main article: Hungary–Yugoslavia relations
Ireland	1977	Main article: Ireland–Yugoslavia relations
Italy		Main article: Italy–Yugoslavia relations
Latvia	1917 (continued relations of the Kingdom of Serbia)	
Lithuania		
Luxembourg	1927	
Malta	6 January 1969	Main article: Malta–Yugoslavia relations
Netherlands		
Norway	26 January 1919	Main article: Norway–Yugoslavia relations
Poland		Main article: Poland–Yugoslavia relations
Portugal	19 October 1917 (continued relations of the Kingdom of Serbia) (Note: Portugal recognised the Socialist Federal Republic of Yugoslavia in 1974 following the Carnation Revolution)	Main article: Portugal–Yugoslavia relations
Romania		Main article: Romania–Yugoslavia relations
Soviet Union	19 December 1945	Main article: Soviet Union–Yugoslavia relations
Spain		Main article: Spain–Yugoslavia relations
Sweden		Main article: Sweden–Yugoslavia relations
Switzerland	1919	Main article: Switzerland–Yugoslavia relations
United Kingdom		Main article: United Kingdom–Yugoslavia relations

== See also ==
- Ministry of Foreign Affairs (Yugoslavia)
- List of international trips made by Josip Broz Tito
- Foreign relations of Bosnia and Herzegovina
- Foreign relations of Croatia
- Foreign relations of Montenegro
- Foreign relations of North Macedonia
- Foreign relations of Serbia
  - Foreign relations of Serbia and Montenegro
- Foreign relations of Slovenia
- Non-Aligned News Agencies Pool
