= North Korea–Serbia relations =

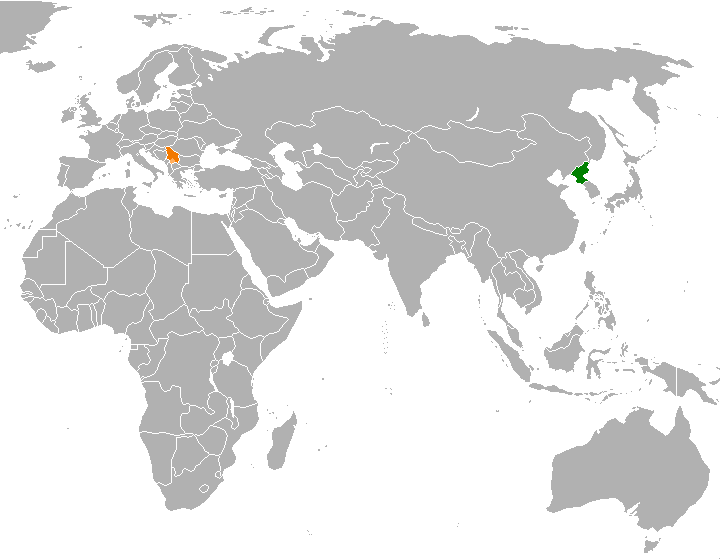

- North Korea: Serbia

North Korea and Serbia maintain diplomatic relations established between North Korea and SFR Yugoslavia in 1948. From 1956 to 2006, North Korea maintained relations with the Socialist Federal Republic of Yugoslavia (SFRY) and the Federal Republic of Yugoslavia (FRY) (later Serbia and Montenegro), of which Serbia is considered shared (SFRY) or sole (FRY) legal successor.

== History ==
The Socialist Federal Republic of Yugoslavia and the Democratic People's Republic of Korea had established diplomatic relations on October 30, 1948. Relations had been very close during the time of Josip Broz Tito and Kim Il Sung. Both leaders had taken a neutral stance during the Sino-Soviet split and maintained friendly relations with both the Soviet Union and China. Both Serbia and North Korea are members of the Non-Aligned Movement. Yugoslavia, of which Serbia was a constituent part, was one of the movement's founding members.

Under President Slobodan Milosević, Serbia had a very close relationship with North Korea. It was rumoured that North Korean students came to study in Belgrade. During the 1999 NATO bombing of Yugoslavia, the North Korean government strongly condemned NATO actions against Serbia. The North Korean foreign minister Paek Man Sun expressed his full support of the Serbian government against NATO, and urged the world community to prevent the United States from using military force in Kosovo. In 2000, a Workers' Party of Korea delegation participated in the fourth congress of the Socialist Party of Serbia, and representative Kim Man Ik delivered a speech condemning American imperialism in the Yugoslav Wars, and expressed his solidarity with the Serbian government and Slobodan Milošević. Regarding Serbia's military actions in Kosovo, Kim said, "The people and armed forces of Yugoslavia, determined to defend to the end the sovereignty of the country, turned out valiantly in a sacred war against the aggression of the US-led NATO forces and fully demonstrated to the rest of the world their indefatigable will and heroic stamina."

In 2017, North Korean Ambassador Ri Pyong Du visited Belgrade and reaffirmed North Korea's support of Serbia's position on Kosovo. Serbian foreign minister Ivica Dačić stressed the need for a diplomatic solution to the North Korean crisis.

== Bilateral treaties ==
- May 25, 1971: agreement on trade and payments.
- September 4, 1973: agreement on the abolition of visas between the two countries.
- November 4, 1974: agreement on cultural cooperation.
- February 22, 1975: agreement on the setting up of a consultative commission for economic and scientific-technical cooperation.
- November 6, 1975: agreement on air services.
- December 11, 1975: agreement on cooperation in telecommunications.
- February 20, 1978: agreement on cooperation in the fields of health, medical science and pharmaceuticals.
- September 20, 1978: agreement on providing health services free of charge to the diplomatic personnel and members of their families on a reciprocal basis.
- March 4, 1982: agreement on the mutual abolition of visas between the SFRY and the DPR of Korea for citizens of the two countries holding ordinary passports when travelling on business.
- November 15, 1995: protocol concerning cooperation between the Federal Ministry of Foreign Affairs of the FRY and the Ministry of Foreign Affairs of the DPR of Korea.
- December 3, 1997: agreed minutes between the Federal Republic of Yugoslavia and the Democratic People's Republic of Korea regarding the treaties in force between the two countries.
- August 26, 1998: agreement on the mutual promotion and protection of investments.
- March 15, 2001: cultural exchange programme between the Federal Government of the Federal Republic of Yugoslavia and the Government of the DPR of Korea for the years 2001–2003.

== Resident diplomatic missions ==
Both countries closed their embassies in each other's capitals in 2001, for financial reasons.

- North Korea is accredited to Serbia through its embassy in Bucharest, Romania.
- Serbia is accredited to North Korea through its embassy in Beijing, China.

== See also ==
- Foreign relations of North Korea
- Foreign relations of Serbia
- North Korea–Yugoslavia relations
- Yugoslavia and the Non-Aligned Movement
