= Kosovo–Venezuela relations =

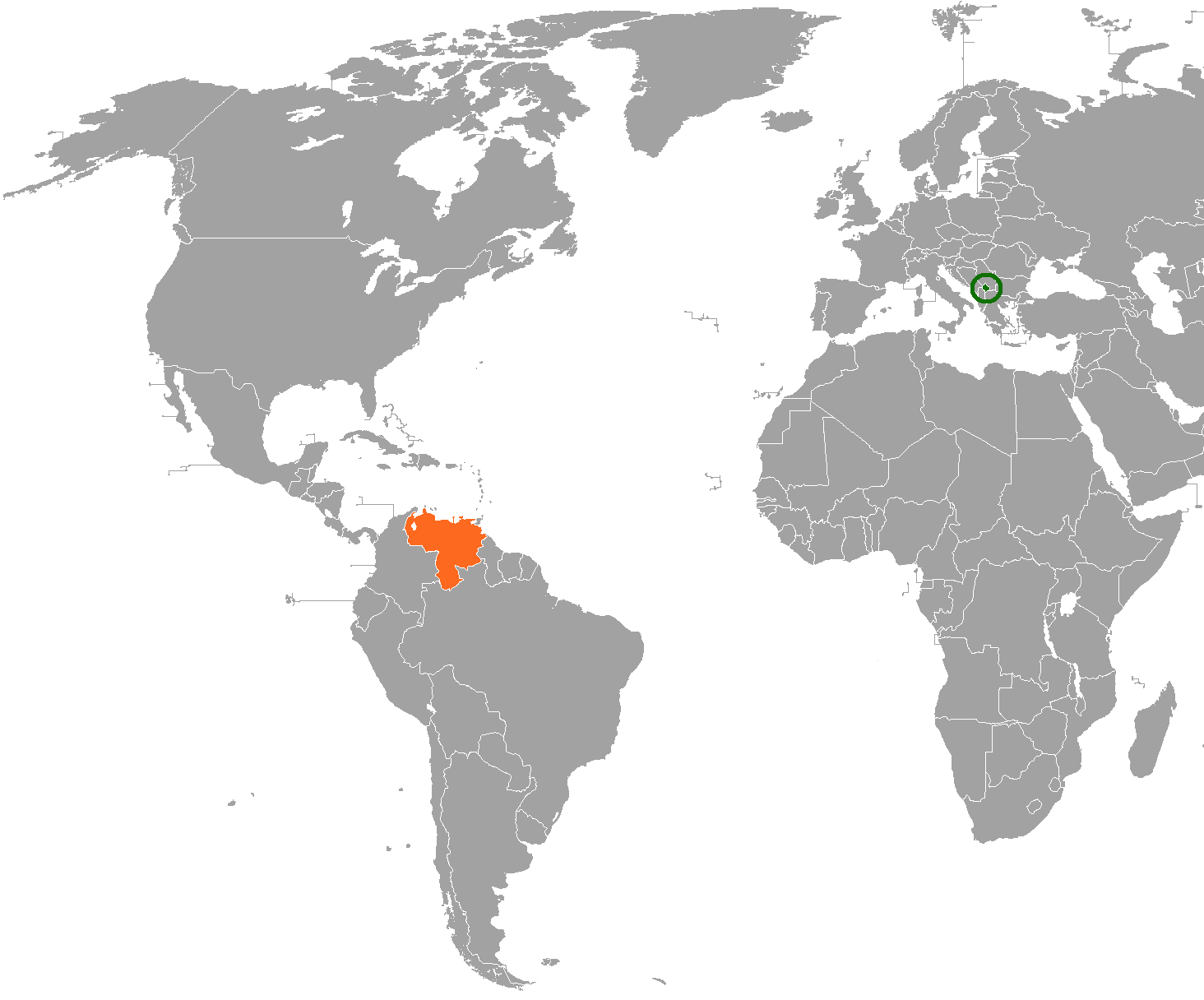
- Kosovo: Venezuela

Kosovo–Venezuela relations are foreign relations between Kosovo and Venezuela. Formal diplomatic relations between two states do not exist as Venezuela has not recognized Kosovo as a sovereign state.

== History ==
After the 2008 Kosovo declaration of independence, Venezuelan president Hugo Chávez announced that Venezuela does not recognise Kosovo's independence on the grounds that it has been achieved through pressure on the United States, saying "This cannot be accepted. It's a very dangerous precedent for the entire world." On 24 March 2008, Chávez accused Washington of attempting to "weaken Russia" by supporting independence for Kosovo. He called Kosovo's prime minister, Hashim Thaçi, a "terrorist" put in power by the U.S.. Chávez had strongly opposed the NATO intervention in Kosovo in 1999 when he first became president. As of 2010, Venezuelan diplomats continued to offer their support to Serbia in "their struggle against separatism".

During the Venezuelan presidential crisis, in 2019, Kosovo recognised Juan Guaidó as President of Venezuela.

== See also ==
- Serbia–Venezuela relations
- Foreign relations of Kosovo
- Foreign relations of Venezuela
- Yugoslavia and the Non-Aligned Movement
