= Foreign relations of Serbia and Montenegro =

Overview of Serbia and Montenegro's foreign relations

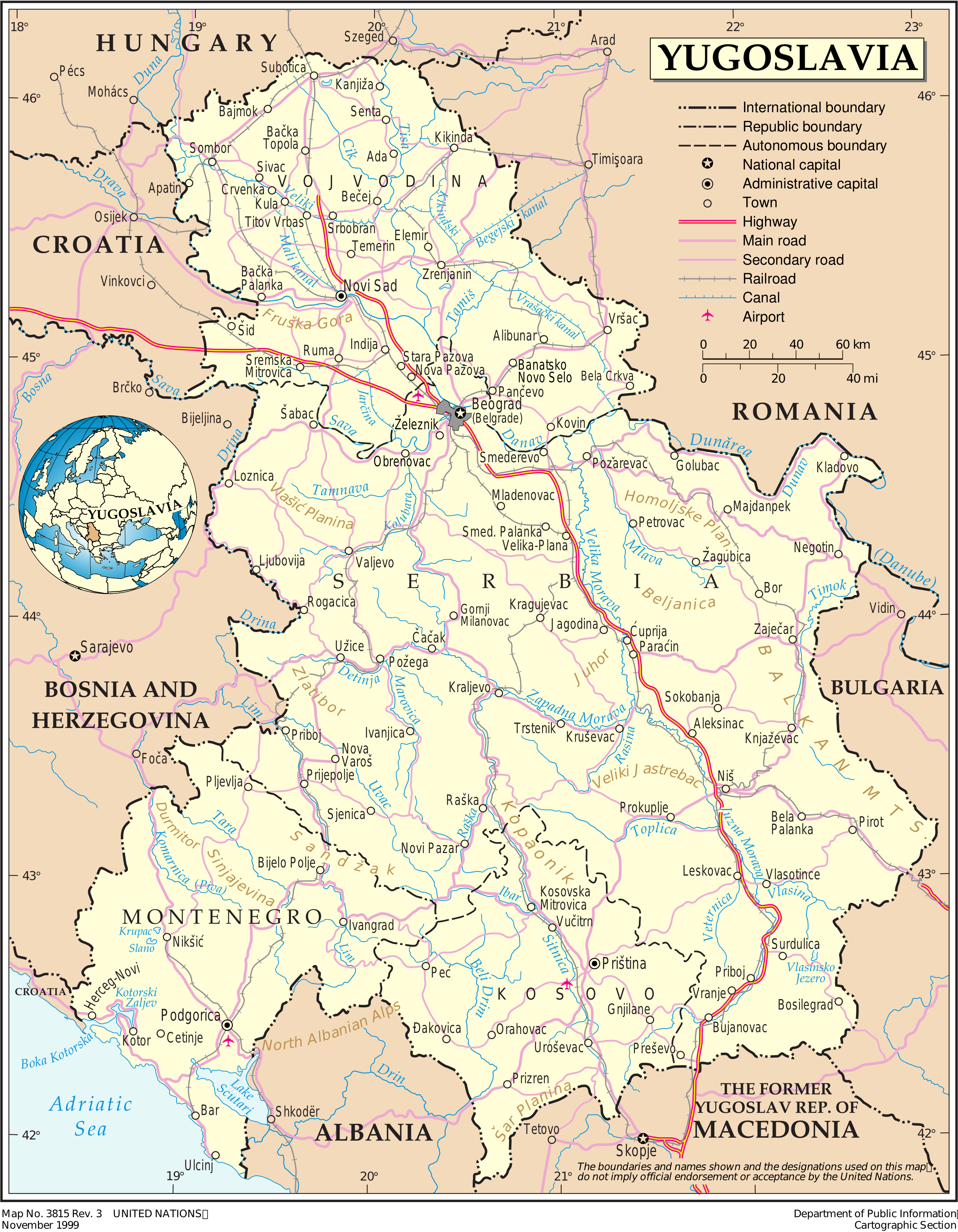
Map of the country.

After the breakup of the Socialist Federal Republic of Yugoslavia (SFR Yugoslavia) in the early 1990s, the foreign policy of the newly established Federal Republic of Yugoslavia (renamed Serbia and Montenegro in 2003) was characterized primarily by a desire to secure its political and geopolitical position and the solidarity with ethnic Serbs in other former Yugoslav republics through a strong nationalist campaign. While the country was involved in Yugoslav Wars and therefore exposed to several rounds of devastating sanctions against Yugoslavia this involvement was often denied for political or ideological reasons. In the initial period Federal Republic of Yugoslavia (FR Yugoslavia) unsuccessfully aspired to gain international recognition as the sole legal successor state to SFR Yugoslavia, the country which was one of the most prominent foreign policy subjects during the Cold War.

Unwilling to accept the interpretation that it is a new state that shares succession with other former SFR Yugoslav republics, FR Yugoslavia rejected to reapply for membership in international organizations leading the country to international isolation and it sometimes being described as a pariah state until the overthrow of Slobodan Milošević in 2000. International status of the country improved somewhat following the 1995 Dayton Peace Agreement which ended Bosnian War and 1995 Erdut Agreement which opened the space for mutual recognition and establishment of full diplomatic relations with Croatia in 1996. This improvement was nevertheless not long lasting with the beginning of Kosovo War and 1999 NATO bombing of Yugoslavia.

Following the overthrow of Slobodan Milošević on 5 October 2000 and the victory of Democratic Opposition of Serbia led by new Prime Minister of Serbia Zoran Đinđić and the new President of the Federal Republic of Yugoslavia Vojislav Koštunica, the country has worked to stabilize and strengthen its bilateral relationships with neighboring countries and the world. The country has joined multiple international organizations such as the Organization for Security and Co-operation in Europe (OSCE) and the United Nations and is actively participating in International Monetary Fund (IMF) and World Bank projects.

Following the 2006 Montenegrin independence referendum which led to the dissolution of the state union two constituents (Republic of Serbia and Republic of Montenegro) agreed on Serbian sole succession of rights and obligations of the FR Yugoslavia with foreign relations of Serbia directly continuing all memberships in international organizations, inheriting federal properties (for example embassies) and accessions to various treaties. Memorandum of Agreement reached on 30 November 2006 additionally ensures Serbian provision of consular services to the Montenegrin citizens on the territory of states in which Montenegro has no missions of its own.

== History ==
In spring and summer 2002, Yugoslavia resolved its longstanding border dispute with Republic of Macedonia. Although a difficult political issue domestically, the country has established a solid working relationship with the United Nations Interim Administration Mission in Kosovo (UNMIK) and has released all disputed ethnic Albanian prisoners from Kosovo to the competent UN bodies.

In 2002, the government established a commission to coordinate cooperation with the International Criminal Tribunal for the former Yugoslavia (ICTY) and began serving warrants for the arrest of indicted war criminals who have sought refuge in the country. The crackdown on organized crime following the assassination of Serbian Prime Minister Zoran Đinđić; also resulted in the apprehension and transfer to the International Criminal Tribunal for the former Yugoslavia in Hague of several persons indicted for war crimes.

Immediately preceding the NATO bombing campaign of the Federal Republic of Yugoslavia in spring 1999, the U.S. and most European countries severed relations with Yugoslavia, and the U.S. embassy was closed. Since October 5, 2000, foreign embassies, including that of the U.S., have reopened, and the country has regained its seat in such international organizations as the Organization for Security and Co-operation in Europe (OSCE) and the United Nations and is actively participating in International Monetary Fund (IMF) and World Bank projects. As of summer 2003, Serbia and Montenegro has been admitted to the Council of Europe and has indicated that it wishes to join NATO's Partnership for Peace.

== Foreign aid ==
Subsequent to the outbreak of hostilities with NATO, Belgrade received no foreign aid from the United States and west European countries, but has received much aid from other countries such as Russia, China, and Greece. Since October 2000, however, the European Union aid has steadily increased, and U.S. restrictions on aid have fallen away as the union of Serbia and Montenegro stepped forward to meet its international obligations. In June 2003, U.S. Secretary of State Colin Powell was able to certify that Serbia and Montenegro relationship with the Republika Srpska was consistent with the Dayton Accords, had released all political prisoners, and was cooperating with the ICTY. As a result, the United States is now free to release aid money and support Serbia and Montenegro in international financial institutions, such as the IMF and World Bank. Total U.S. aid to Serbia and Montenegro, including debt forgiveness, exceeded $180 million in fiscal year 2002. The U.S. is the single-largest donor of aid to Serbia and Montenegro.

== International disputes ==
- Several Albanian political parties in Kosovo voice union with Albania
- Has delimited about half of the boundary with Bosnia and Herzegovina, but sections along the Drina River remain in dispute.
- There is also a dispute with Bosnia regarding the exclave of Sastavci village in Priboj municipality (which is entirely surrounded by Serbian territory), as well as Serbian "practical" exclave comprising several villages in the same area.
- Some disputes with Croatia regarding the border. In 2002 there was a border incident regarding river island near Šarengrad, when Serbian border police prevented landowners from Croatia to visit their properties (lying in Serbian territory) using boats.
- In late 2002, Serbia and Montenegro and Croatia adopted an interim agreement to settle the disputed Prevlaka Peninsula, allowing the withdrawal of the UN monitoring mission (UNMOP), but discussions could be complicated by the inability of Serbia and Montenegro to come to an agreement on the economic aspects of the new federal union.
- After a 2005 shooting of an Albanian youth crossing the border with Macedonia, there have been calls for autonomy for Albanians in the Preševo region, having international troops put as border guards, and making of more border crossings.

== Illicit drugs ==
- Transshipment point for Southwest Asian heroin moving to Western Europe on the Balkan route; economy vulnerable to money laundering

== See also ==
- Foreign relations of Serbia
- Foreign relations of Montenegro
- Foreign relations of Yugoslavia
- Montenegro–Serbia relations
- Kosovo–Serbia relations
- Kosovo–Montenegro relations
