= Venezuela–Yugoslavia relations =

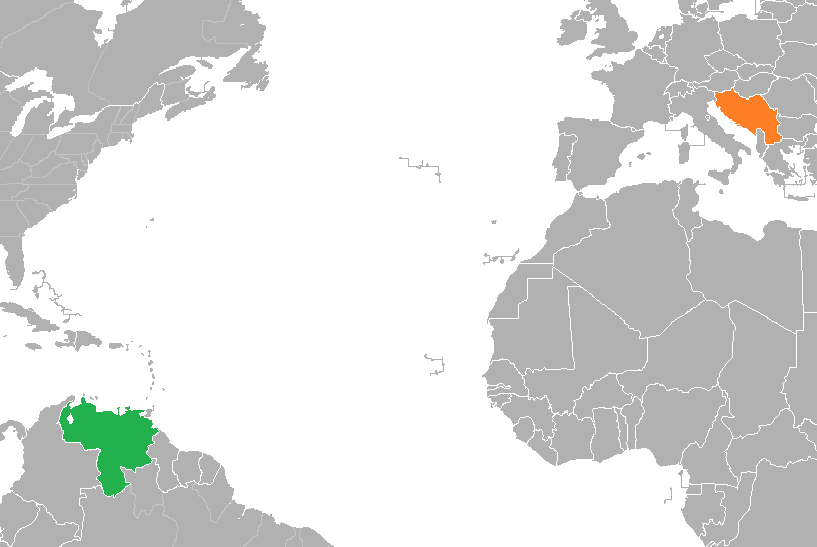

- Venezuela: Yugoslavia

Venezuela–Yugoslavia relations were historical foreign relations between Venezuela and now broken up Yugoslavia. Venezuela and Socialist Federal Republic of Yugoslavia established diplomatic relations in 1951.

The President of Yugoslavia, Josip Broz Tito, travelled to Venezuela on 17 March 1976 for a three-day official visit. At the end of this visit, Tito and Venezuelan President Carlos Andrés Pérez, signed a statement supporting the Non-Aligned Movement. At that time, Venezuela participated only as an observer and had not yet been accepted as a full member.

== Bilateral agreements ==
- 9 July 1977; Basic agreement on cultural exchange, scientific and technical cooperation
- 10 June 1988; Trade agreement

== See also ==
- Foreign relations of Venezuela
- Foreign relations of Yugoslavia
- Serbia–Venezuela relations
