= Serbia–Venezuela relations =

- Serbia: Venezuela

Serbia and Venezuela maintain diplomatic relations established between SFR Yugoslavia and Venezuela in 1951. From 1951 to 2006, Venezuela maintained relations with the Socialist Federal Republic of Yugoslavia (SFRY), and the Federal Republic of Yugoslavia (FRY) (later Serbia and Montenegro), of which Serbia is considered shared (SFRY) or sole (FRY) legal successor.

== History ==
In 1993, during the Bosnian War, Venezuela was a member of the United Nations Security Council, and argued strongly for, and voted to impose sanctions on Serbia and Montenegro over their support for Bosnian Serbs in battles with Bosniaks around Srebrenica.

== Political relations ==
In 2010, Minister of Foreign Affairs of Serbia, Vuk Jeremić, and the Minister of Foreign Affairs of Venezuela, Nicolas Maduro, signed two agreements on political and educational cooperation as well as agribusiness and energy projects.

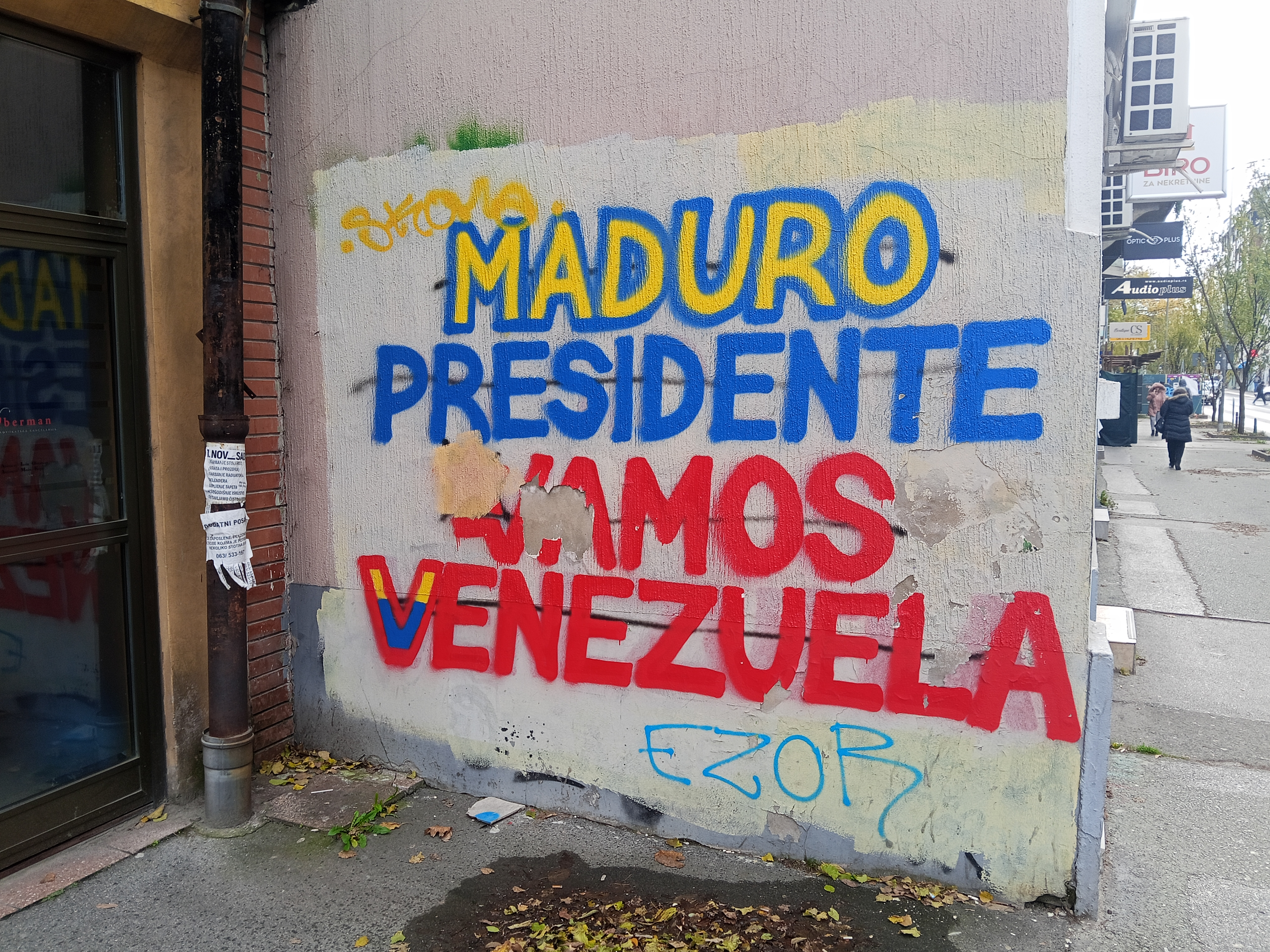
Graffiti in support of Nicolás Maduro in Novi Sad, Serbia

In 2023, Minister of Foreign Affairs of Serbia, Ivica Dačić, and Minister of Foreign Affairs of Venezuela, Yvan Gil Pinto, signed an agreement on the abolition of visas for holders of ordinary passports and the declaration on political consultations between the two countries.

Serbia was one of a small number of European nations that recognized Maduro as the winner of the rigged 2024 election with Vučic publicly congratulating Maduro and calling the relationship between the two countries as friendly.

In January 2025, Serbia was one of only three European countries to attempt Maduro's inauguration with the others being Belarus and Russia. Serbia was represented by Ana Brnabic, speaker of the Serbian parliament, acting as the personal envoy to Vučic. Brnabic talked with Maduro during the visit and congratulated him on Vučic's behalf with Maduro thanking Vučic.

On 19 August 2025, Venezuela expressed support for Serbian president Aleksandar Vučic during mass protests against perceived corruption calling it an attempt to destabilize Serbia and the wider Balkan region.

=== Venezuela's stance on Kosovo ===
After the 2008 Kosovo declaration of independence, Venezuelan President Hugo Chávez announced that Venezuela will not recognise Kosovo's independence on the grounds that it has been achieved through American pressure, saying "that cannot be accepted - it's a very dangerous precedent for the entire world." On 24 March 2008, Chávez accused Washington of trying to "weaken Russia" by supporting independence for Kosovo. He called Kosovo's new leader, Prime Minister Hashim Thaçi, a "terrorist" put in power by the U.S. and noted that the former rebel leader's nom de guerre was "The Snake". Chávez had strongly opposed the NATO intervention in Kosovo in 1999 when he first became president. As of 2010, Venezuelan diplomats continued to offer their support to Serbia in "their struggle against separatism".

== Resident diplomatic missions ==
- Serbia has an embassy in Caracas.
- Venezuela has an embassy in Belgrade.

== See also ==
- Foreign relations of Serbia
- Foreign relations of Venezuela
- Venezuela–Yugoslavia relations
- Serbian Venezuelans
