= Agreement on Succession Issues of the Former Socialist Federal Republic of Yugoslavia =

2001 international treaty on state succession

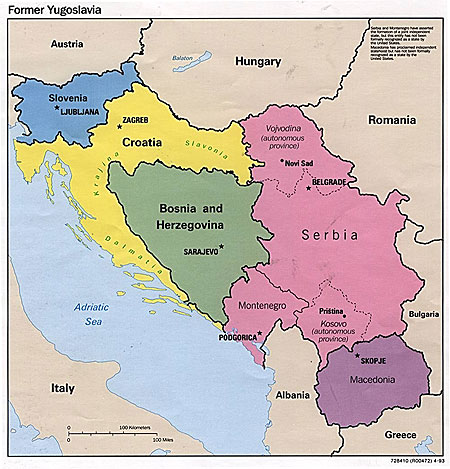
- Post-Yugoslav signatories: FR Yugoslavia (Note: Renamed to Serbia and Montenegro in 2003); Croatia; FYRO Macedonia (Note: Designation used due to the Macedonian naming dispute by Greece until 2019 when the country was renamed to North Macedonia); Slovenia; Bosnia and Herzegovina
- Type: Multilateral treaty
- Signed: 29 June 2001
- Location: Vienna, Austria
- Effective: 2 June 2004
- Original signatories: Federal Republic of Yugoslavia (Goran Svilanović); Croatia (Tonino Picula); Slovenia (Dimitrij Rupel); Bosnia and Herzegovina (Zlatko Lagumdžija); Macedonia (Ilija Filipovski)
- Language: English

The Agreement on Succession Issues of the Former Socialist Federal Republic of Yugoslavia (Note: Serbo-Croatian: Споразум о питањима сукцесије бивше Социјалистичке Федеративне Републике Југославије / Sporazum o pitanjima sukcesije bivše Socijalističke Federativne Republike Jugoslavije Macedonian: Договор за прашањата за сукцесија на поранешната Социјалистичка Федеративна Република Југославија Slovene: Sporazum o vprašanjih nasledstva nekdanje Socialistične federativne republike Jugoslavije) is an international agreement on shared state succession of the Socialist Federal Republic of Yugoslavia reached among its former constituents republics following the breakup of the country in early 1990s.

The agreement was reached in 2001, after the end of Yugoslav Wars and protracted negotiations facilitated by international community, that there are five sovereign equal successor states of the SFR Yugoslavia (Slovenia, Croatia, Bosnia and Herzegovina, Macedonia (today North Macedonia) and the Federal Republic of Yugoslavia (today Serbia – the sole successor state of the latter, excluding Montenegro). It entered into force on 2 June 2004 when the last successor state (Croatia) ratified it. Contrary to some other cases in which only one country would act as a sole legal successor state (for example Russia in case of the former Soviet Union), multiple new states participated in the state succession of the former Yugoslavia with none of them therefore continuing in full international legal personality of the previous state or inheriting automatically memberships in multilateral institutions or treaties.

The agreement was signed as an umbrella agreement which included annexes on diplomatic and consular properties, financial assets and liabilities, archives, pensions, other rights, interests and liabilities as well as private properties and acquired rights. As of 2021 daily implementation of the Agreement remains only partial with significant differences in each annex and with particular challenges in restitution of cross-state immovable property rights for private companies and individuals (Annex G) particularly pronounced in restitution of private property rights in Croatia.

== Background ==
While Slovenia, Croatia, Bosnia and Herzegovina and Macedonia interpreted the breakup of Yugoslavia as a definite replacement of the earlier Yugoslav socialist federation with new sovereign equal successor states, newly established FR Yugoslavia (Serbia and Montenegro) claimed that it is sole legal successor entitled to the assets as well as automatic memberships in international organisations and agreements of SFR Yugoslavia.

Arbitration Commission of the Peace Conference on Yugoslavia was established on 27 August 1991 providing a formal negotiating platform for the Yugoslav republics with the Commission declaring on 29 November 1991 that SFR Yugoslavia was in the process of a dissolution opening the doors for recognition of new states. The Commission received the Single Inventory of the Assets and Liabilities of SFRY as on 31 December 1990 which was confirmed in 1993 but was rejected by Serbia and Montenegro after removal of Milan Panić. Earlier, on 12 February 1992 Serbia and Montenegro agreed to reconstitute their federation and on 27 April 1992 declared the formation the Federal Republic of Yugoslavia as the direct continuing state with full legal personality of the former SFR Yugoslavia. The Federal Republic of Yugoslavia insisted that it was the exclusive legal and political continuation of Socialist Yugoslavia as well as the owner of all state property owned by the earlier socialist federal government, and that it was willing to renounce a part of it only as an act of goodwill. This interpretation was rejected by the European Community and the United States as well as any subsequent succession claims by subnational entities (Federation of Bosnia and Herzegovina, Republika Srpska or Republic of Serbian Krajina).

The first negotiations on succession issues of the former Socialist Yugoslavia began in 1992 within the framework of the Working Group on Succession Issues Peace Conference on Yugoslavia. The Federal Republic of Yugoslavia interpreted the breakup of Yugoslavia as a process of serial secessions and not as a complete dismemberment of the earlier state, an interpretation rejected by the other former Yugoslav republics. The Badinter Arbitration Committee recommended a division of assets and liabilities based on principle of equity, referring to the 1983 Vienna Convention on Succession of States in Respect of State Property, Archives and Debt (a convention not in force which at the time was signed by only six states, including SRF Yugoslavia). This proposal was unacceptable to the Federal Republic of Yugoslavia which therefore motivated the International Monetary Fund to develop an alternative key model which considered the economic power of republics and their contribution to the federal budget, which was accepted by all. The key determined participation of Federal Republic of Yugoslavia with 36.52%, Croatia with 28.49%, Slovenia 16.39%, Bosnia and Herzegovina with 13.20% and Macedonia with 5.20%.

The negotiations were continued only in 1995. On 22 November 1995 United Nations Security Council adopted United Nations Security Council Resolution 1022 welcoming the efforts to reach consensual agreement on state succession that will enable transfer of assets to the new states. An agreement was also reached on gold and other reserves at the Bank for International Settlements, but the final conclusion was postponed by the beginning of the Kosovo War.

== See also ==
- Foreign relations of Yugoslavia
- Foreign relations of Serbia and Montenegro
  - Foreign relations of Serbia
    - Foreign relations of Kosovo
  - Foreign relations of Montenegro
- Foreign relations of Croatia
- Foreign relations of Slovenia
- Foreign relations of Bosnia and Herzegovina
- Foreign relations of North Macedonia
- United Nations Security Council Resolution 777
