= Guyana–Yugoslavia relations =

- Guyana: Yugoslavia

Guyana and Yugoslavia

Guyana–Yugoslavia relations were historical foreign relations between Guyana and now split-up Socialist Federal Republic of Yugoslavia. Yugoslavia developed diplomatic interest in Guyana as a part of its prominent and active involvement in the Non-Aligned Movement. As a European and Mediterranean country and the founding member of the Non-Aligned Movement Yugoslavia was suspicious of Cuban Tricontinental (African-Asian-Latin American) proposals and emphases within the movement which Belgrade perceived as indirect Soviet efforts to undermine Yugoslavia. Guyana was perceived as an alternative voice in Latin America while the country itself perceived the Non-Aligned Movement as an opportunity for foreign policy affirmation.

Two countries developed various forms of cooperation which never turned into significant economic links. Guyana People's Militia of the Guyana Defence Force was modeled on a similar institutions developed by the Yugoslav People's Army. After the breakup of Yugoslavia Guyana's judge Mohamed Shahabuddeen has been thrice elected as a permanent judge of the International Criminal Tribunal for the Former Yugoslavia. Since there was no one single successor state of Yugoslavia all former republics participated in succession in which Slovenia got the building of the former Yugoslavia's embassy in Georgetown.

== History ==
Between 1 and 4 February 1971 Prime Minister of Guyana Forbes Burnham was invited to Yugoslavia by Mitja Ribičić during which he also met President of Yugoslavia Josip Broz Tito. At the same time Shridath Ramphal and Mirko Tepavac signed an agreement on technical cooperation which enabled citizens of Guyana to receive scholarships in Yugoslavia.

In 5–8 March 1974 Guyana and Yugoslavia, together with Australia, Guinea, Jamaica, Sierra Leone and Suriname signed Agreement Establishing the International Bauxite Association. On 12 December 1974 Guyana and Yugoslavia, together with Algeria and Tanzania following the report of the International Civil Service Advisory Board jointly proposed a draft resolution to increase salaries and allowances within the United Nations salary framework.

== See also ==
- Yugoslavia and the Non-Aligned Movement
- Death and state funeral of Josip Broz Tito
