= Vietnam–Yugoslavia relations =

North Vietnam–Yugoslavia relations
- North Vietnam: Yugoslavia

Vietnam–Yugoslavia relations

- Vietnam: Yugoslavia

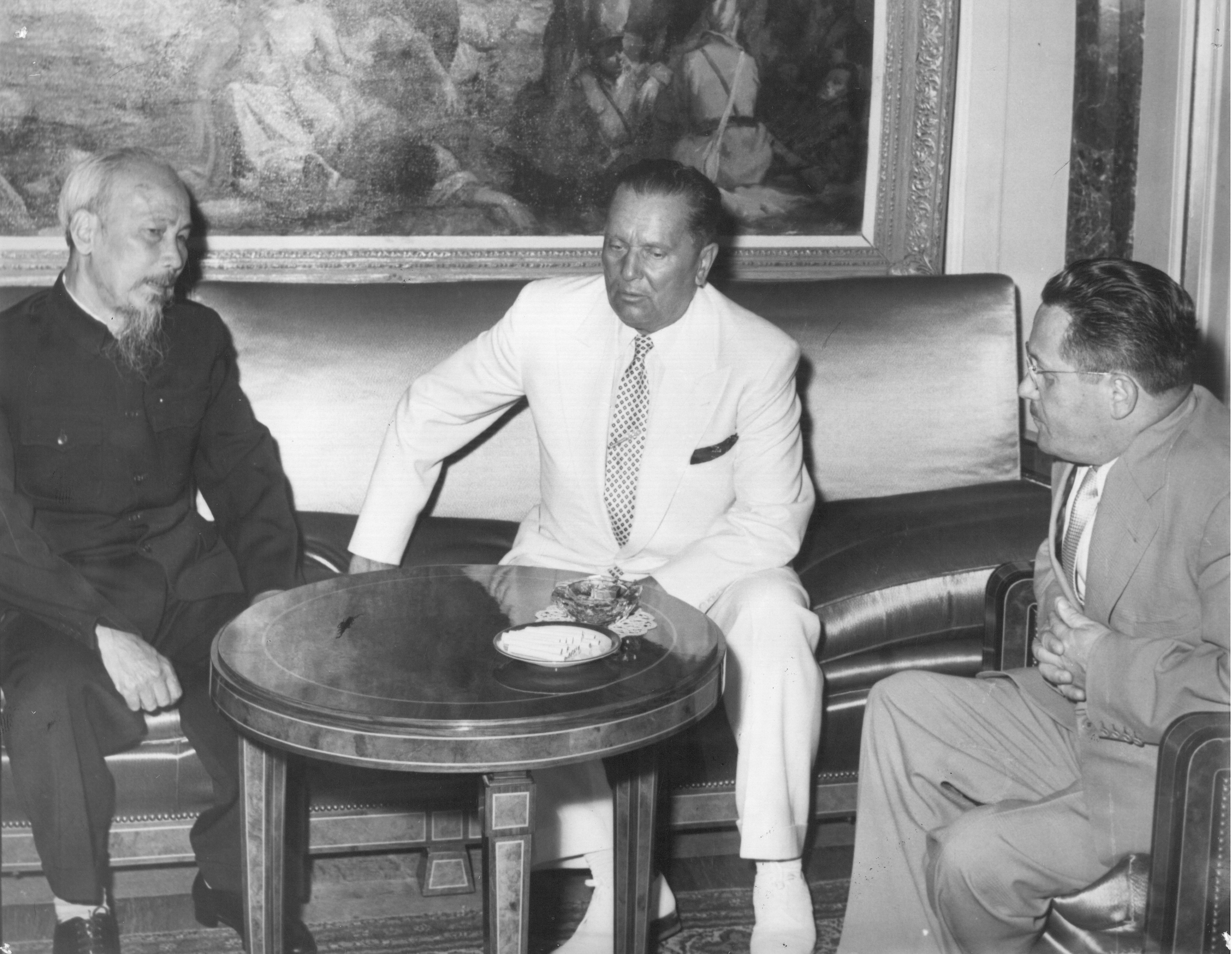
Ho Chi Minh, Josip Broz Tito and Edvard Kardelj in Belgrade in 1957

Vietnam–Yugoslavia relations were historical foreign relations between Vietnam (up to 1976 North Vietnam) and now split-up Socialist Federal Republic of Yugoslavia. Two countries established formal bilateral relations in 1957. Relations were predominantly positive due to positive public image of Vietnam in Yugoslavia which was result of Vietnamese resistance to foreign domination and shared membership in the Non-Aligned Movement.

Despite developed diplomatic relations with the United States and other Western Bloc countries, Yugoslavia clearly and publicly dissociated itself from American policy in Vietnam. During 1960s Yugoslav cities faced street violence and riots during which strong anti-American sentiments were expressed and calls against the Vietnam War. In 1967 Yugoslavia normalized its relations with Holy See, after which Pope Paul VI together with President of Yugoslavia Josip Broz Tito collaborated in efforts to bring peace to Vietnam. In 1969 Yugoslav authorities established the Coordination Committee for Aid to the People of Vietnam-Indochina as a body subordinated to the Socialist Alliance of the Working People of Yugoslavia. Between 18 and 24 May 1971 Nguyễn Thị Bình, minister of foreign affairs in the Provisional Revolutionary Government of the Republic of South Vietnam, visited Yugoslavia where she met president Tito, Mitja Ribičić, Mirko Tepavac and Gustav Vlahov during which two sides agreed to establish formal bilateral relations.

Relations between Yugoslavia and Vietnam were negatively affected by the Cambodian–Vietnamese War since Belgrade believed that despite internal situation in Cambodia foreign interference was unjustified and could have led to a wider Sino-Soviet conflict.

== See also ==
- Yugoslavia and the Non-Aligned Movement
- Death and state funeral of Josip Broz Tito
