= Trinidad and Tobago–Yugoslavia relations =

- Trinidad and Tobago: Yugoslavia

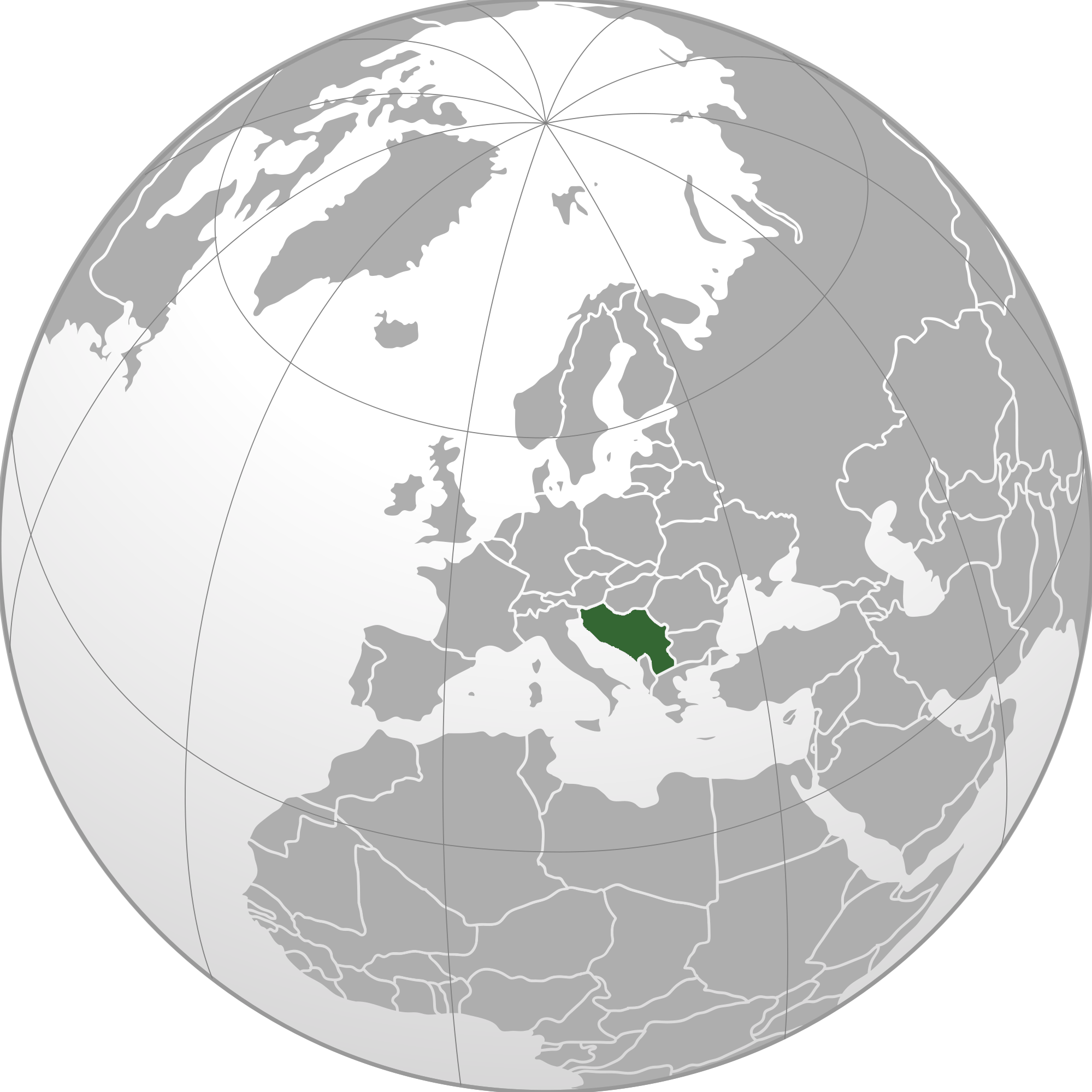
Trinidad and Tobago and Yugoslavia

Trinidad and Tobago–Yugoslavia relations were historical foreign relations between Caribbean island nation of Trinidad and Tobago and now split-up Socialist Federal Republic of Yugoslavia.

Yugoslav diplomats were invited to the Trinidad and Tobago's independence ceremony in 1962 and two countries established formal bilateral relations in 1965. The first visit to Yugoslavia by the Prime Minister of Trinidad and Tobago Eric Williams happened a couple of months before the official relations were established. Williams stayed in Yugoslavia between 8 and 10 April 1965 where he met President of Yugoslavia Josip Broz Tito on Brijuni islands in the Socialist Republic of Croatia. A Yugoslav trade mission led by the advisor at the Embassy of Yugoslavia in Washington, D.C. visited Trinidad and Tobago between 25 and 31 May 1965, where they met Prime Minister Eric Williams, Governor of Trinidad Sir Werner Boos, and other dignitaries. Following the breakup of Yugoslavia and the Yugoslav Wars, judge Melville Baird from Trinidad and Tobago served at the International Criminal Tribunal for the former Yugoslavia.

== See also ==
- Yugoslavia and the Non-Aligned Movement
- Death and state funeral of Josip Broz Tito
