= Bolivia–Yugoslavia relations =

Bolivia-Yugoslavia relations
- Bolivia: Yugoslavia

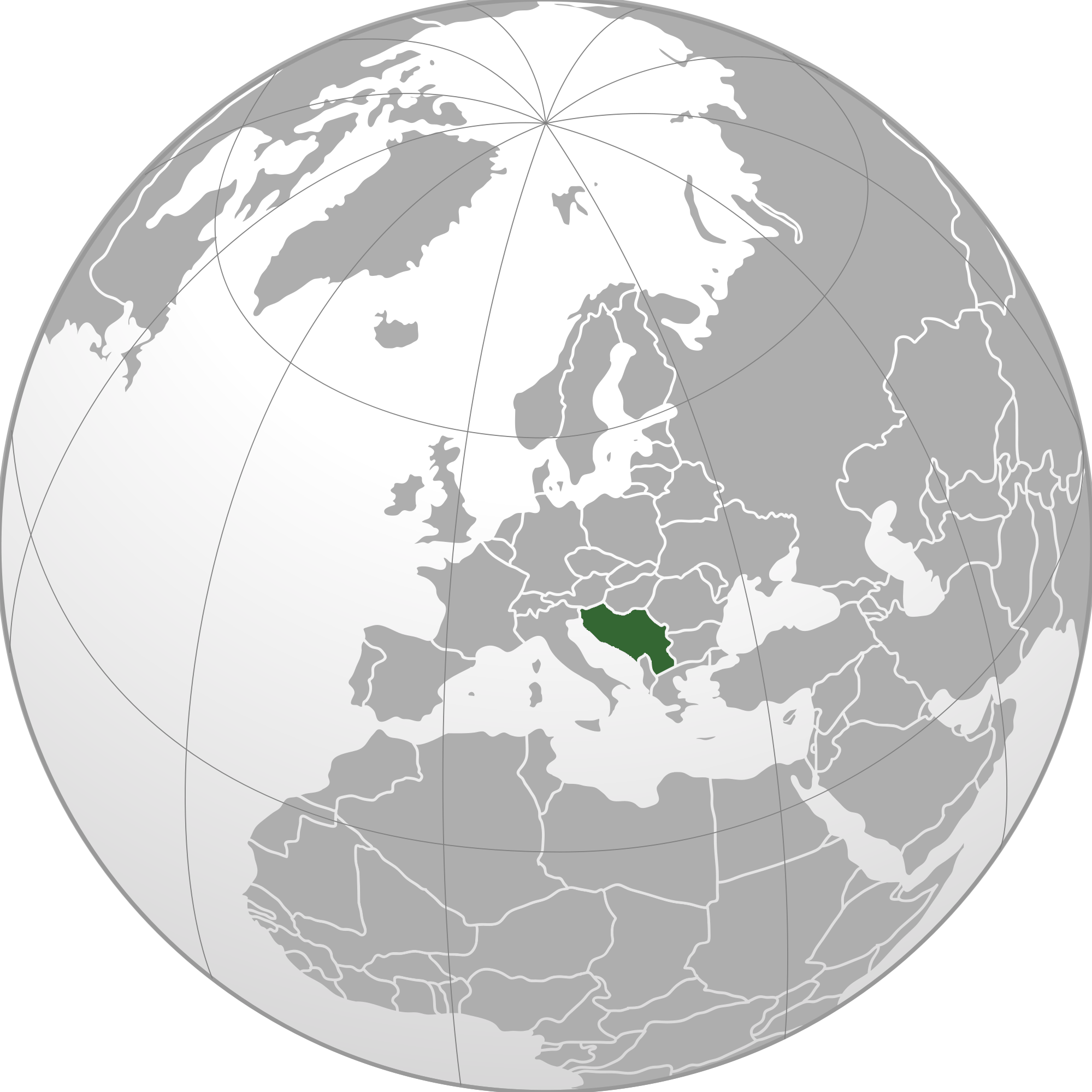
Bolivia and Yugoslavia

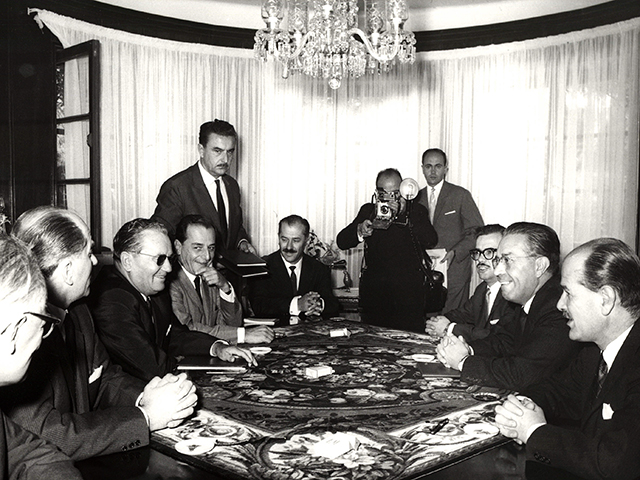
Bolivian-Yugoslav meeting in Cochabamba in 1963.

Bolivia–Yugoslavia relations were historical foreign relations between Bolivia and now split-up Socialist Federal Republic of Yugoslavia. Relations were established and developed in the context of Yugoslav Non-Aligned policy during the Cold War in which Yugoslavia cooperated with countries both outside Eastern and Western Bloc.

Bolivia was one of destinations of South Slavic (especially Croat) immigration with many emigrant communities antagonistic attitude towards their country of origin.

Bolivia participated in the 1961 Non-Aligned Conference in Belgrade as an observer state represented by Minister of Education Felma Valorde. During his visit to Yugoslavia Foreign Minister of Bolivia signed convention on cultural cooperation while in 1962 Minister of Foreign Affairs of Yugoslavia Koča Popović visited Bolivia and signed expanded version of the convention. In 1963 President of Yugoslavia Josip Broz Tito organized a month long (18 September-17 October) South American tour during which he visited Brazil, Chile, Bolivia, Peru and Mexico.

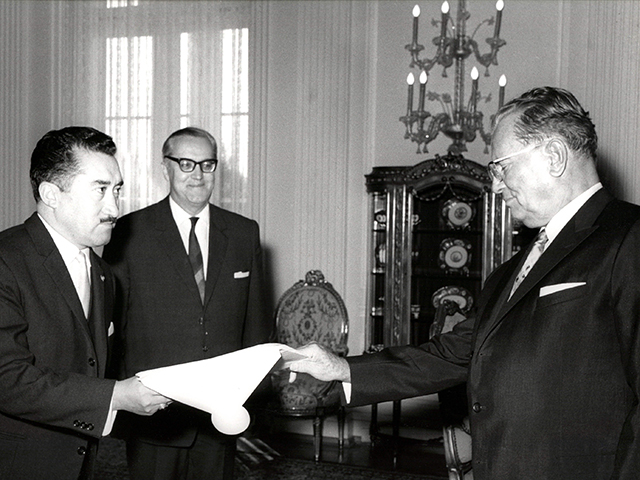
President Josip Broz Tito receiving Ambassador of Bolivia (1968)

== See also ==
- Yugoslavia and the Non-Aligned Movement
- Death and state funeral of Josip Broz Tito
- Bolivia at the 1984 Winter Olympics
