= Nicaragua–Yugoslavia relations =

- Nicaragua: Yugoslavia

Nicaragua and Yugoslavia

Relations between Nicaragua and Yugoslavia developed within the context of the Non-Aligned Movement, which was established in Belgrade in 1961. Both nations used the Non-Aligned Movement as a mechanism to further their own course in foreign policy and development. Within the Non-Aligned Movement, Yugoslavia closely collaborated with self-described core members of India and Egypt while Nicaragua followed self-described progressive group in which Cuba played prominent role. Relations between the two countries were affected by this division within the movement's membership. After the 1948 Tito-Stalin split, Yugoslavia insisted on equidistance towards both blocs during the Cold War and perceived Nicaragua as de facto Soviet aligned country; Yugoslavia therefore opposed Nicaraguan bid to host the 1989 conference, just 10 years after Cuba hosted it in 1979, and submitted its own counter-bid which was selected by the movement.

Due to Nicaraguan close relations with the Soviet Union, its relations with Yugoslavia were not as developed as with the countries of the Soviet-led Comecon. While economic assistance cooperation in 1979-83 period with Soviet Union amounted to 443.7 million USD, or Yugoslav smaller neighbor People's Republic of Bulgaria 232.5 million USD, this type of cooperation with Yugoslavia amounted 40 million USD in total. At the end of November 1984 Yugoslavia sent 106 million USD worth of food to Nicaragua with Yugoslav ambassador Ivan Kojić stating that "each one of these grains represents the days of peace that we wish for the Nicaraguan people".

== See also ==
- Yugoslavia and the Non-Aligned Movement
- Nicaraguan Revolution
- Yugoslav Wars
