= Afghanistan–Yugoslavia relations =

- Afghanistan: Yugoslavia

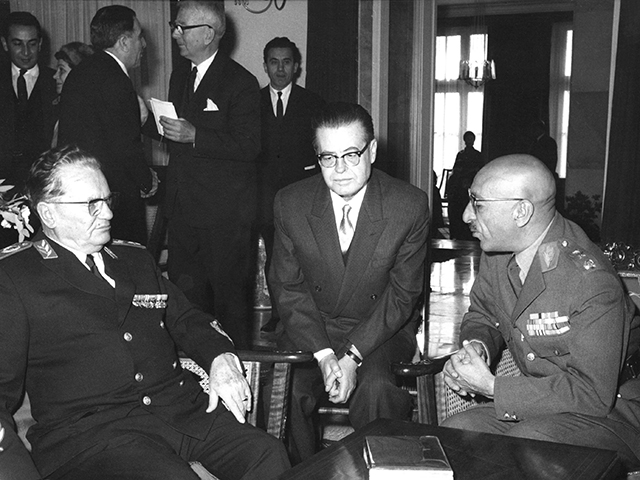
President of Yugoslavia Josip Broz Tito and King of Afghanistan Mohammed Zahir Shah in Kabul in 1968.

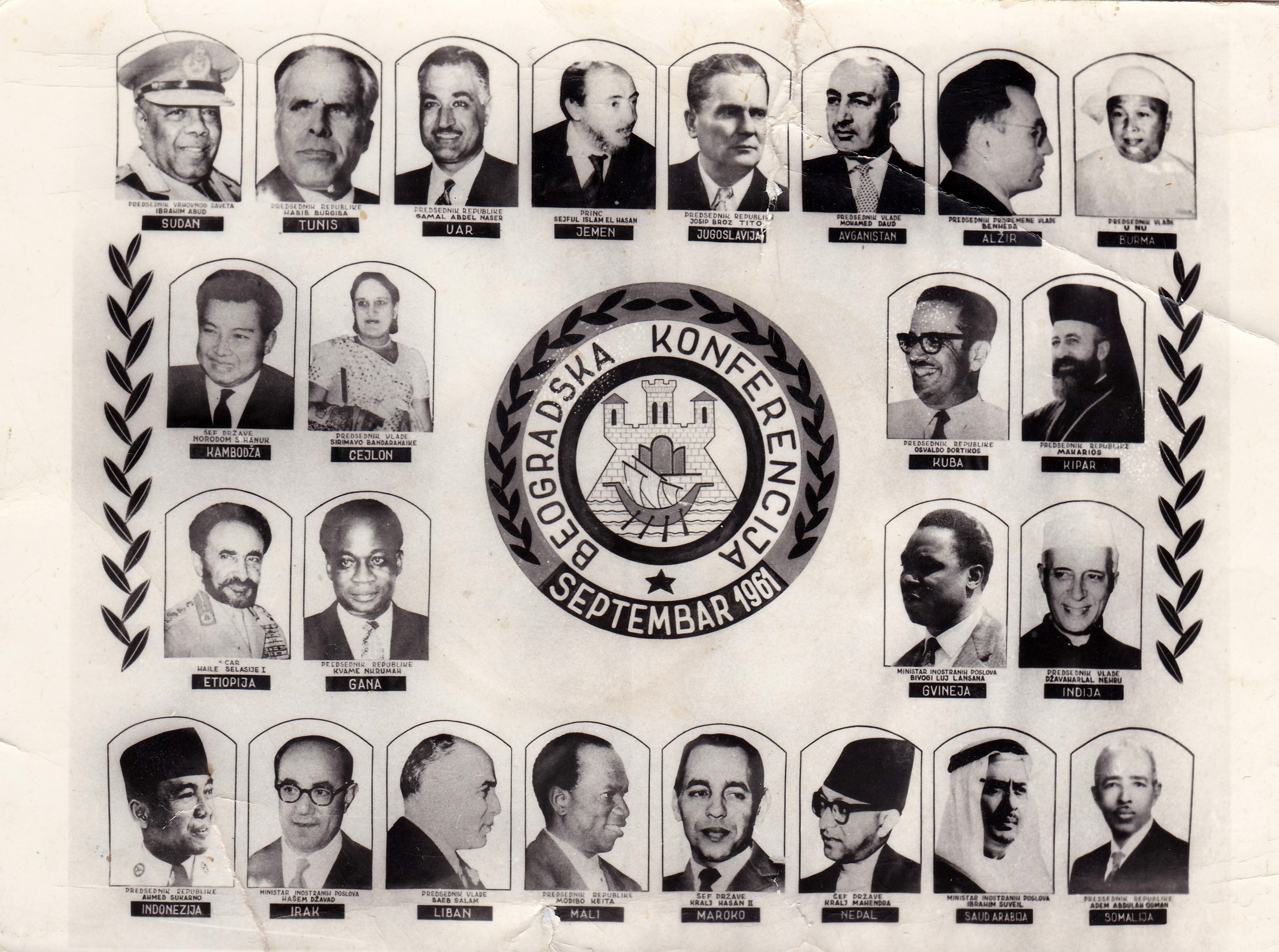
Participants of the 1961 Belgrade NAM Conference.

Afghanistan–Yugoslavia relations were historical foreign relations between Afghanistan and now split-up Socialist Federal Republic of Yugoslavia. Both countries were founding members of the Non-Aligned Movement. Afghan Prime Minister Daoud Khan represented the Kingdom of Afghanistan at the 1961 First Conference of Heads of State or Government of the Non-Aligned Movement in Belgrade.

== History ==
=== Soviet intervention in Afghanistan ===
Yugoslav diplomacy was highly alarmed by the 1979 Soviet intervention in Afghanistan, which, similarly to Yugoslavia, was at the time a non-aligned and socialist country outside of the Warsaw Pact. Yugoslavia officially condemned Soviet intervention and expressed "astonishment" and "deep concern" over developments in Afghanistan. The intervention happened when President of Yugoslavia Josip Broz Tito's health deteriorated with perception that Moscow was waiting for Tito to die in order to renew its pressure on Belgrade. Tito's funeral turned into the largest state funeral in history. Yugoslavia insisted that the Non-Aligned Movement organize a special ministerial meeting where Soviet intervention would be condemned, the kind of action which until then was always reserved for Western countries. India was not ready to support the Yugoslav initiative, fearing it will strengthened the position of Pakistan and China, while Cuba, the chair of the Movement at the time, was in fact closely aligned with the Soviet Union. Following the intervention, Yugoslavia limited its diplomatic presence in Afghanistan to a level of the chargé d'affaires.

== See also ==
- Yugoslavia and the Non-Aligned Movement
- Zahir Tanin
- 1973 Non-Aligned Standing Committee Conference
- Afghanistan conflict (1978–present)
- Yugoslav Wars
- Death and state funeral of Josip Broz Tito
- People's Democratic Party of Afghanistan
  - Khalq
  - Parcham
- League of Communists of Yugoslavia
  - Tito–Stalin split
  - Titoism
  - Workers' self-management
- Yugoslav Muslims
  - Islam in Bosnia and Herzegovina, Kosovo, North Macedonia, Serbia, Croatia, Montenegro and Slovenia
- Christianity in Afghanistan
- Kaymak
