= Lebanon–Yugoslavia relations =

- Lebanon: Yugoslavia

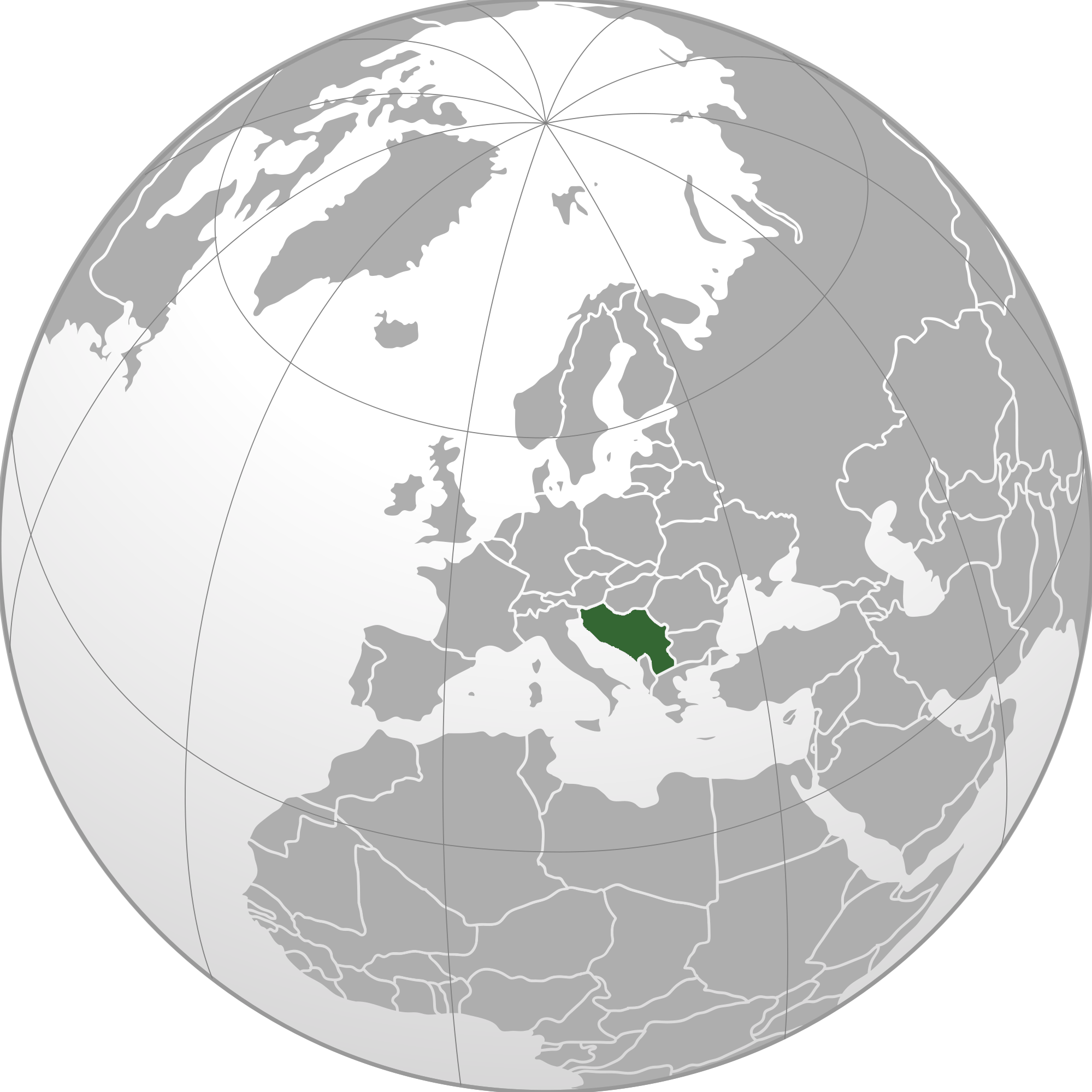
Lebanon and Yugoslavia

Lebanon–Yugoslavia relations were historical foreign relations between Lebanon and now split-up Socialist Federal Republic of Yugoslavia. Both countries self-identified with the wider Mediterranean region and shared membership in the Non-Aligned Movement. Formal bilateral relations between Lebanon and Yugoslavia were established in 1946. Lebanon participated at the 1961 First Conference of Heads of State or Government of the Non-Aligned Movement in Belgrade. Both countries experienced significant instabilities and conflicts with weak central authorities which in Yugoslav case led to complete dismemberment of federal institutions and violent breakup of the state. Instability in both countries led to the establishment of special courts; the Special Tribunal for Lebanon and International Criminal Tribunal for the former Yugoslavia.

== History ==
=== Cultural and historical relations ===
Two countries had a long shared history in which at different points both were entirely or partially included in the Hellenistic period, Roman Empire, Byzantine Empire, Ottoman Empire, French administration (Illyrian Provinces and Greater Lebanon). Both regions are religiously and culturally diverse with points of convergence representing Islam in Lebanon and Yugoslavia (Bosnia, Kosovo, Serbia, North Macedonia), Eastern Orthodoxy in Lebanon and Yugoslavia (Serbia, Montenegro, North Macedonia) Eastern Catholic Maronite Church and Greek Catholic Church of Croatia and Serbia.

=== Post-World War II relations ===
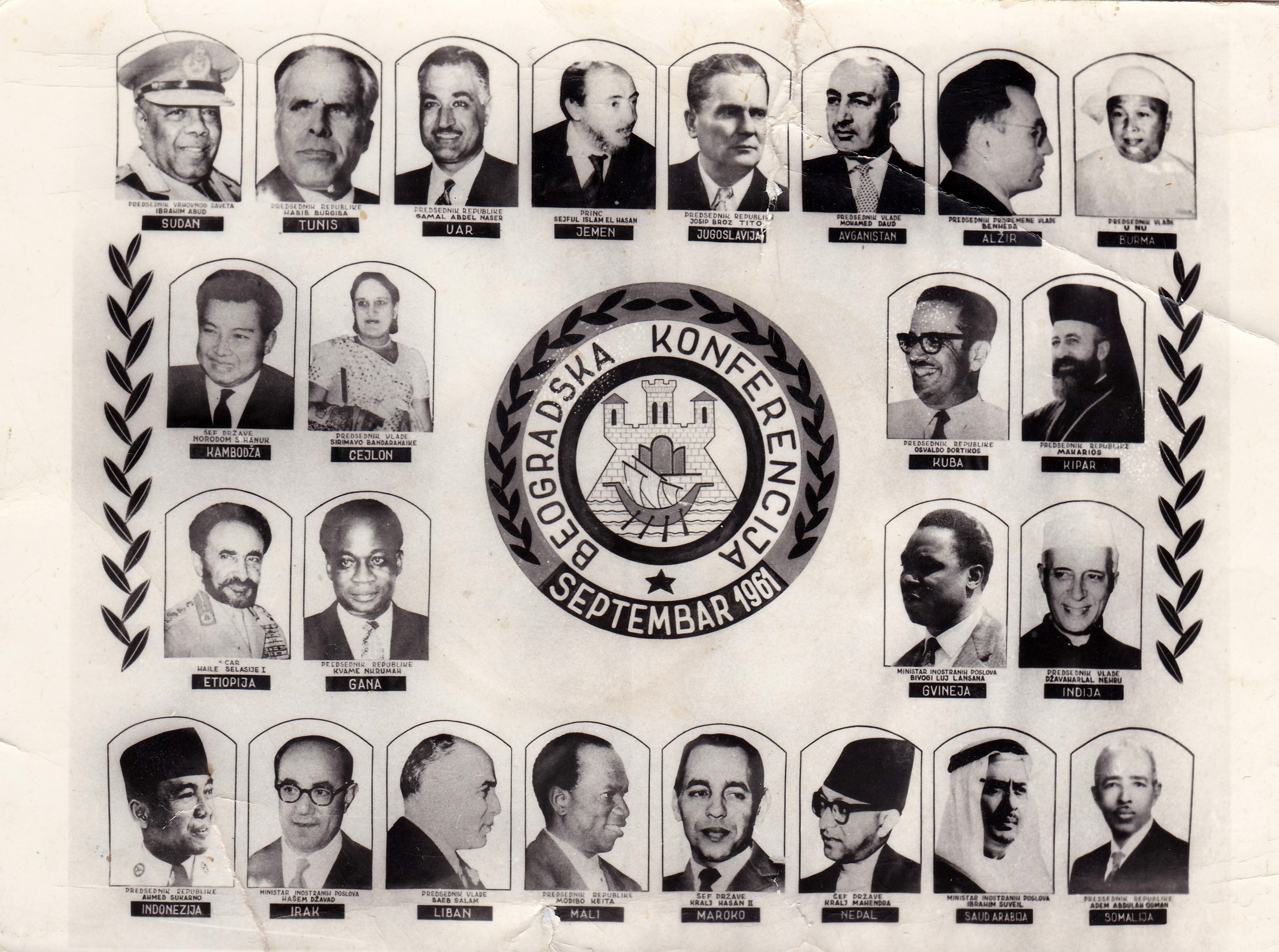
Saeb Salam with other participants on 1961 NAM Conference.

After they established formal bilateral relations two countries signed agreement on trade in 1954, air transportation agreement in 1955, cultural cooperation agreement in 1962 and tourism cooperation agreement in 1972. Both Lebanon and Yugoslavia underwent substantial economic and social modernization in the period after the end of World War II which affected different regions to a different extent.

== See also ==
- Yugoslavia and the Non-Aligned Movement
- Yugoslav Wars
- Lebanese Civil War
- 1959 Mediterranean Games
- 1979 Mediterranean Games
- Death and state funeral of Josip Broz Tito
- Lebanon at the 1984 Winter Olympics
