= Sri Lanka–Yugoslavia relations =

Sri Lanka-Yugoslavia relations
- Sri Lanka: Yugoslavia

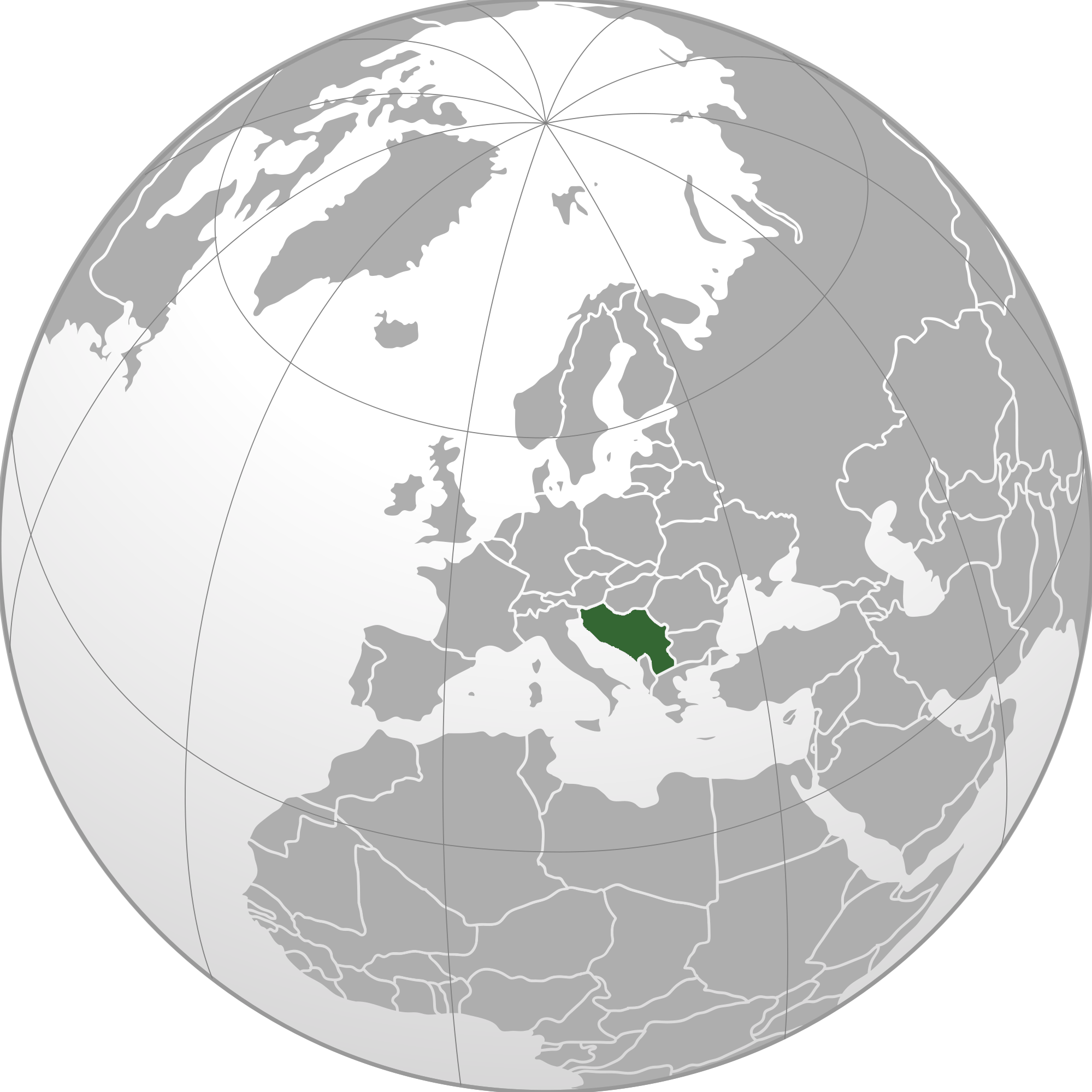
Sri Lanka and Yugoslavia

Sri Lanka–Yugoslavia relations were historical foreign relations between Sri Lanka and now split-up Socialist Federal Republic of Yugoslavia. In the period of the Cold War both countries were the founders and among core members of the Non-Aligned Movement. Diplomatic relations were established on 14 October 1957.

Prime Minister of Sri Lanka Sirimavo Bandaranaike participated in the 1st Summit of the Non-Aligned Movement in Belgrade. Yugoslav delegation took a prominent place in ceremonies during the 5th Summit of the Non-Aligned Movement in 1976. While the Delegation itself arrived to the city by plane, the country also sent the Yugoslav training ship Galeb to the Port of Colombo ahead of the event. The ship served as a venue for bilateral and informal meetings with other participants with first lady Jovanka Broz serving as a host.

Two countries signed an agreement on the avoidance of double taxation during the meeting in Colombo on 7 May 1985.

Some authors compared the violence and ethnic cleansing of the Sri Lankan Civil War with similar crimes and violence of the Yugoslav Wars. Following the breakup of Yugoslavia and Yugoslav Wars judge Asoka De Zoysa Gunawardana from Sri Lanka served at the International Criminal Tribunal for the former Yugoslavia.

In 2014, the former Permanent Representative of Sri Lanka to the United Nations in Geneva Tamara Kunanayakam accused the government of betrayal by appointing for international experts and advisers on missing persons the same people who divided Yugoslavia into a number of nations.

== See also ==
- Yugoslavia and the Non-Aligned Movement
- Yugoslav Wars
- Sri Lankan Civil War
- India–Yugoslavia relations
