= Seychelles–Yugoslavia relations =

- Seychelles: Yugoslavia

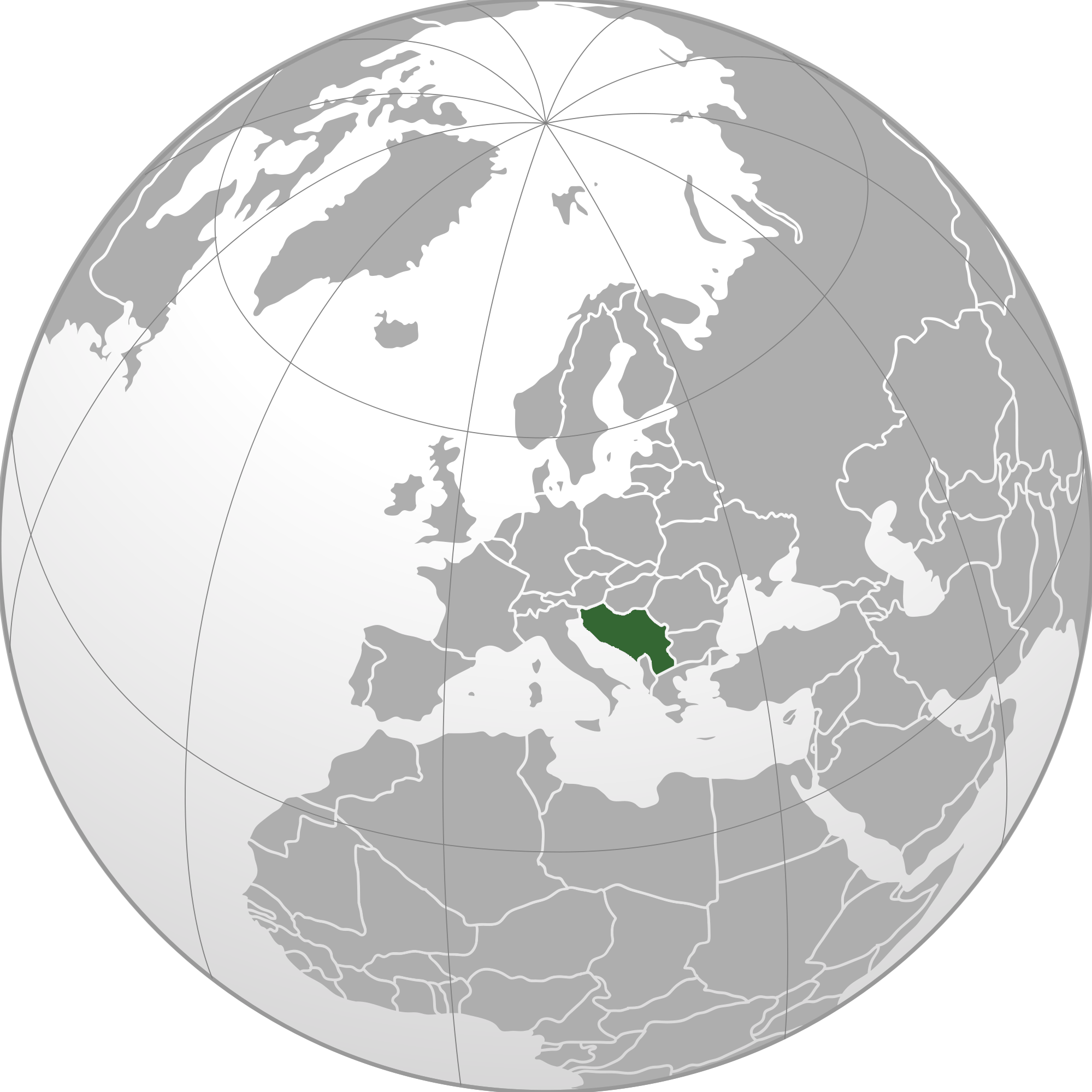
Seychelles and Yugoslavia

Seychelles–Yugoslavia relations were the historical foreign relations between Seychelles and Yugoslavia. The two countries established formal relations in 1977, upon the independence of Seychelles from the United Kingdom. Both countries were members of the Non-Aligned Movement during the Cold War.

== History ==
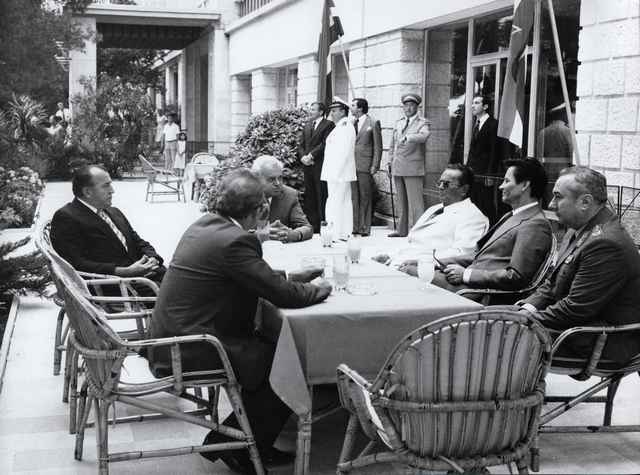
Yugoslav delegation waiting for Seychellois President René on Brijuni Islands, SR Croatia, 1979

As newly independent Seychelles declared itself a non-aligned state, it received considerable support from other non-aligned nations, including Yugoslavia, a founding member state of the movement. Bilateral relations were strong, and Yugoslavia provided material and technical support for the development of the fishing industry in Seychelles, as well as road and harbour construction in the country. Yugoslavia also provided diplomatic support for the Seychelles' Indian Ocean policy and there was media cooperation between the two nations. Seychellois President France-Albert René paid a state visit to Belgrade in July 1979 and several state visits by officials of both countries continued until the disintegration of Yugoslavia in 1992. Seychelles was represented in Yugoslavia through its embassy in Paris, France, and Yugoslavia was represented in Seychelles through its embassy in Dar es Salaam, Tanzania.

== See also ==
- Yugoslavia and the Organisation of African Unity
