= Kosovo–Montenegro relations =

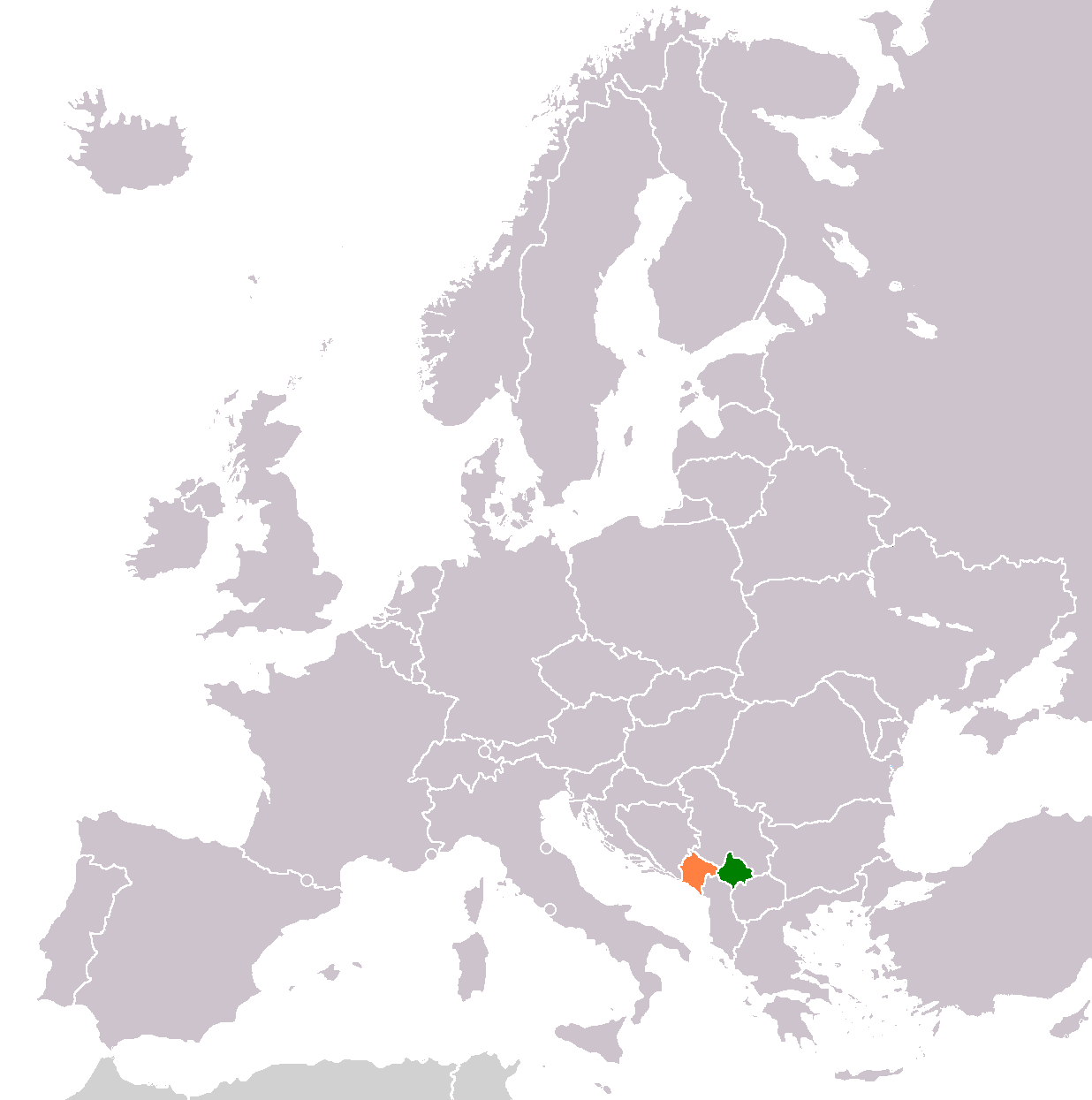

- Kosovo: Montenegro

Diplomatic mission
- Embassy of Kosovo, Podgorica: Embassy of Montenegro, Pristina

Envoy
- Ambassador Ylber Hysa: Ambassador Ferhat Dinosha

Kosovo–Montenegro relations are foreign relations between Kosovo and Montenegro. Montenegro has a 78.6 km (48.8 mi)-long border with Kosovo. It was the 49th state to recognise Kosovo's independence. Due to their common origins and statehoods, they share a highly cooperative and symbiotic relationship. Limited regional geopolitical issues remain, with Montenegro's historic ties to Serbia complicating bilateral relations with an independent Kosovo.

== International recognition ==
Kosovo declared its independence from Serbia on 17 February 2008 and Montenegro recognised it on 9 October 2008. Outside Montenegro's Albanian and Bosniak minority communities, which account for around 20 percent of the population, there was little support in the country for recognizing Kosovo.

Before the recognition, on 24 June, Prime Minister Milo Đukanović said:

Many important member states of the EU and the international community as a whole have already recognised Kosovo so I do not believe that any serious person would like the wheel of history to go back. We are acting rather cautiously for two reasons. The first is that we are a neighbour of both Kosovo and Serbia, so we should help rather than feed fuel to the fire by making rush moves. The second is that we have been independent for only two years now and we have achieved this independence by leaving the Union with Serbia. Our independence has left some traumas on the Serbia-Montenegro relationship.

Three days later an official with the governing DPS party said that recognising Kosovo "is not currently on the agenda of national priorities." On 7 July 2008 Montenegrin Minister of Foreign Affairs told Podgorica media that his government will recognise Kosovo's independence. He did not, however, say when the government would make such an announcement. When he asked whether it will be sooner or later he responded with "Neither I nor anyone else can say at this moment. It shall happen as soon as we conclude that it is politically best for Montenegro." However, on 15 July, in an interview with a Russian radio station, Đukanović said that his nation has not yet taken a position on recognition, adding that this "restraint" was caused by the need to contribute, as a neighbor, to stability in the region and improve relations with Serbia.

== Revocation of recognition by Zeta and Pljevlja ==
On May 12, 2026 the Zeta Municipality withdrawn their recognition of Kosovo urging other municipalities that have Serbian mayors to do the same thing. Reason for the decision was due to the worsening conditions of Montenegrins and Serbs in Kosovo and respect of Serbian sovereignty and territorial integrity. On 21 July 2026, the municipality of Pljevlja also withdrew recognition of Kosovo. The municipalities of Zeta and Pljevlja adopted a declaration that calls for the revocation of Montenegro’s decision to recognise Kosovo.

== Foreign affairs ==
On 2 December 2009, Montenegrin Deputy Prime Minister Svetozar Marovic said that there are no obstacles for Montenegro to establish diplomatic relations with Kosovo. He also said that Montenegro has about 10,000 displaced people from Kosovo, a thousand of whom would like to return to their hometowns and it is up to the governments of Kosovo and Montenegro to resolve it. On 15 January 2010, Montenegro and Kosovo officially established diplomatic relations. Numerous motions have come from Kosovo and elsewhere for an exchange of embassies to formally show the mutual declarative establishment of diplomatic links, however President Filip Vujanović has continually rejected that possibility, stating the status of the Montenegrin minority in Kosovo and the return of expelled non-Albanian refugees as a precondition, ever since the recognition in 2008.

On 31 May 2012, Montenegro declared that it was to open an embassy in Kosovo stating that "good relations with neighbours and development of regional cooperation represent a lasting goal, stimulating progress in the countries of the region when it comes to EU and Euroatlantic integration and boosting stability in the region as a whole." On 30 July 2013, Montenegro officially opened an embassy in Pristina, with Radovan Miljanić appointed its chargé d'affaires.

== Border demarcation ==
The border demarcation deal with Montenegro was one of the explicit requirements by the European Parliament for the visa liberalization process for Kosovo. In 2015, Ramush Haradinaj insisted that the 1974 Yugoslav borders were necessary in order to continue the good relations with Montenegro. The agreement was ratified by both governments in 2015 and was enforced March 2018 leading to Čakor being handed over to Montenegro. Kosovos prime minister Hashim Thaqi and Montenegros prime minister signed the agreement on February 17, 2018. The agreement has been criticized for being hypocritical as the prohibition to travel within the Schengen area had been lifted for more severe border issues amongst Georgia and Ukraine but not for Kosovo with its less severe border issues.

Villagers in the Rugova valley vowed to take up arms if the government continued to ignore them. In 2016, The Lëvizja Vetëvendosje accused PDK party of for the agreement of the Border Demarcation with Montenegro. Prime minister Isa Mustafa met the Rugova locals opposing the demarcation in 2016. A local stated that the prime minister did not say anything about the matter. Levizja Vetendesojes party leader Albin Kurti held a protest speech with 2000 activists leading to the postponing of the demarcation in the Kosovo parliament. In August 2015, prime minister Ramush Haradinaj criticized the demarcation. Four years later, in 2019, he met Mujë Rugova, to discuss the finalization of the demarcation. Ibrahim Rugova warned of the demarcation already in 2002.

On August 28, 2015, a RTK employee suffered a second attack in his home by a group that opposed the demarcation. An unknown individual tossed an explosive device inside resulting in no one being hurt. A group called Rugovasit claimed both attacks warning of more victims if the government continued to ignore the opposition. On August 30, six opposition supporters were detained by the police on suspicion of involvement in a rocket-propelled grenade attack on parliament. The European and International Federations of Journalists (EFJ/IFJ) condemned the attacks. Violent protests occurred in Pristina with riot police being attacked with molotovs. An article by Kosovapress writes that the Rugova locals attacked RTK because it supported the demarcation.

Independent Balkan News Agency published an article explaining that international experts, appointed by Atifete Jahjaga, stated that the demarcation did not breach any laws. The opposition criticized the commission of being too similar to previous commissions. Both Albanian and Montenegrin locals around the borders stated that the politicians should take into consideration the opinions of the public. A report from Saferworld titled Drawing boundaries in the Western Balkans: A people’s perspective published in 2011 states that failure to resolve demarcation issues and raise border-control standards likewise ensures that parts of the region maintain a reputation for being vulnerable to transnational organised crime, smuggling and people trafficking.

== See also ==
- Foreign relations of Kosovo
- Foreign relations of Montenegro
- Accession of Kosovo to the European Union
- Accession of Montenegro to the European Union
- Montenegro–Serbia relations
