= Mongolia–Yugoslavia relations =

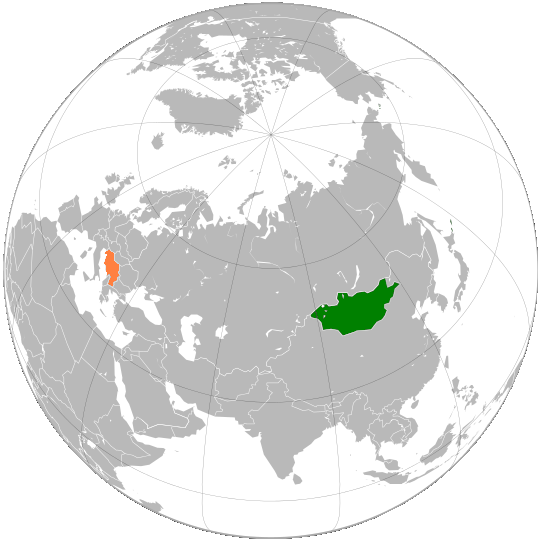

- Mongolia: Yugoslavia

Mongolia–Yugoslavia relations were historical foreign relations between Mongolian People's Republic and now split-up Socialist Federal Republic of Yugoslavia.

== History ==
During the Cold War period Mongolia closely followed Soviet Union in its policies towards Yugoslavia. That meant that following the Tito–Stalin split, relations were strained. However, following Stalin's death and Belgrade declaration, relations were normalized. Formal bilateral relations between Mongolia and Yugoslavia were established on 20 November 1956.

During the 1968 Ulaanbaatar meeting, government delegations of the two countries expressed identical views on the situation in Vietnam, condemned aggression and expressed hope for negotiations which will start soon. The Yugoslav delegation was led by President of Yugoslavia Josip Broz Tito, who received an honorary doctorate from the country. According to Svetozar Rajak, "in a way… the first white European who did not come to subjugate and arrived instead as an equal, professing independence and mutual respect."

During the meeting, Tito and his wife visited a traditional yurt, where their Mongolian hosts insisted on dressing them in traditional Mongolian clothing.

The two countries signed agreement on scientific and cultural cooperation in 1985 as well as an agreement on provision of development aid to Mongolia.

== See also ==
- Yugoslavia and the Non-Aligned Movement
- World War II in Yugoslavia
- Mongolia in World War II
- Mongolia at the 1984 Winter Olympics
- Mongol invasion of Europe
