= North Korea–Yugoslavia relations =

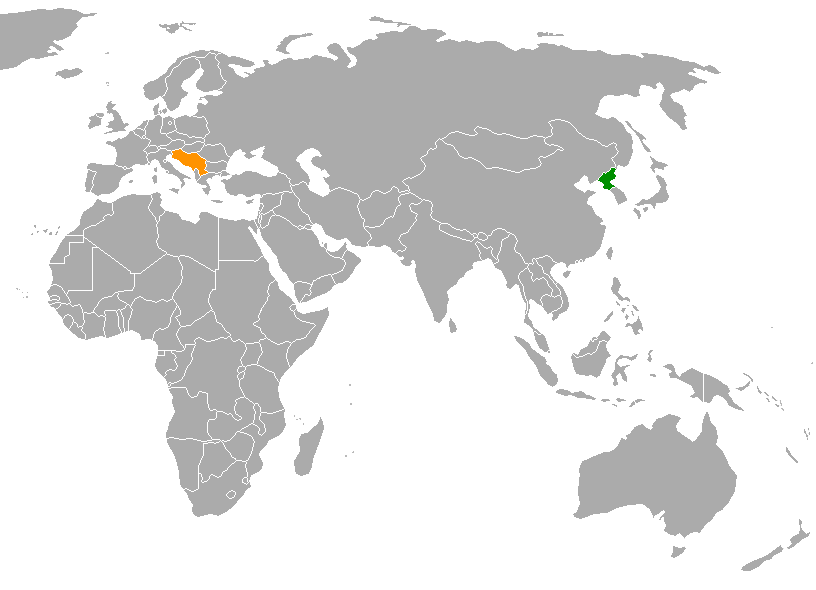

- North Korea: Yugoslavia

North Korea–Yugoslavia relations were historical foreign relations between North Korea and the former Yugoslavia. The Federative People's Republic of Yugoslavia and the Democratic People's Republic of Korea established diplomatic relations on 30 October 1948. During the initial period of the Korean conflict, motivated by the recent Tito-Stalin split and contrary to the Eastern Bloc, Yugoslavia remained firmly non-aligned to any of the blocs in the Korean War. Yugoslav literature compared the attack on South Korea by North Korea to the Axis Powers' attack on Yugoslavia and the attack on Hawaii by the Japanese army while Yugoslav representatives at the United Nations even accused the Soviet Union of having started the Korean War.

Relations became very close during the later years of Josip Broz Tito. By then, the Sino-Soviet split had occurred and Kim Il-sung maintained friendly relations with both the Soviet Union and China by adopting a neutral posture, not dissimilar to Yugoslav policy towards the wider Cold War. Yugoslavia and North Korea were members of the Non-Aligned Movement with Yugoslavia being one of the movement's founding members.

== Bilateral agreements ==
- 25 May 1971: agreement on trade and payments.
- 4 September 1973: agreement on the abolition of visas between the two countries.
- 4 November 1974: agreement on cultural cooperation.
- 22 February 1975: agreement on the setting up of a consultative commission for economic and scientific-technical cooperation.
- 6 November 1975: agreement on air services.
- 11 December 1975: agreement on cooperation in telecommunications.
- 20 February 1978: agreement on cooperation in the fields of health, medical science and pharmaceuticals.
- 20 September 1978: agreement on providing health services free of charge to the diplomatic personnel and members of their families on a reciprocal basis.
- 4 March 1982: agreement on the mutual abolition of visas between the SFRY and the DPR of Korea for citizens of the two countries holding ordinary passports when travelling on business.

== See also ==
- Foreign relations of North Korea
- Foreign relations of Yugoslavia
