= Jamaica–Yugoslavia relations =

Jamaica-Yugoslavia relations
- Jamaica: Yugoslavia

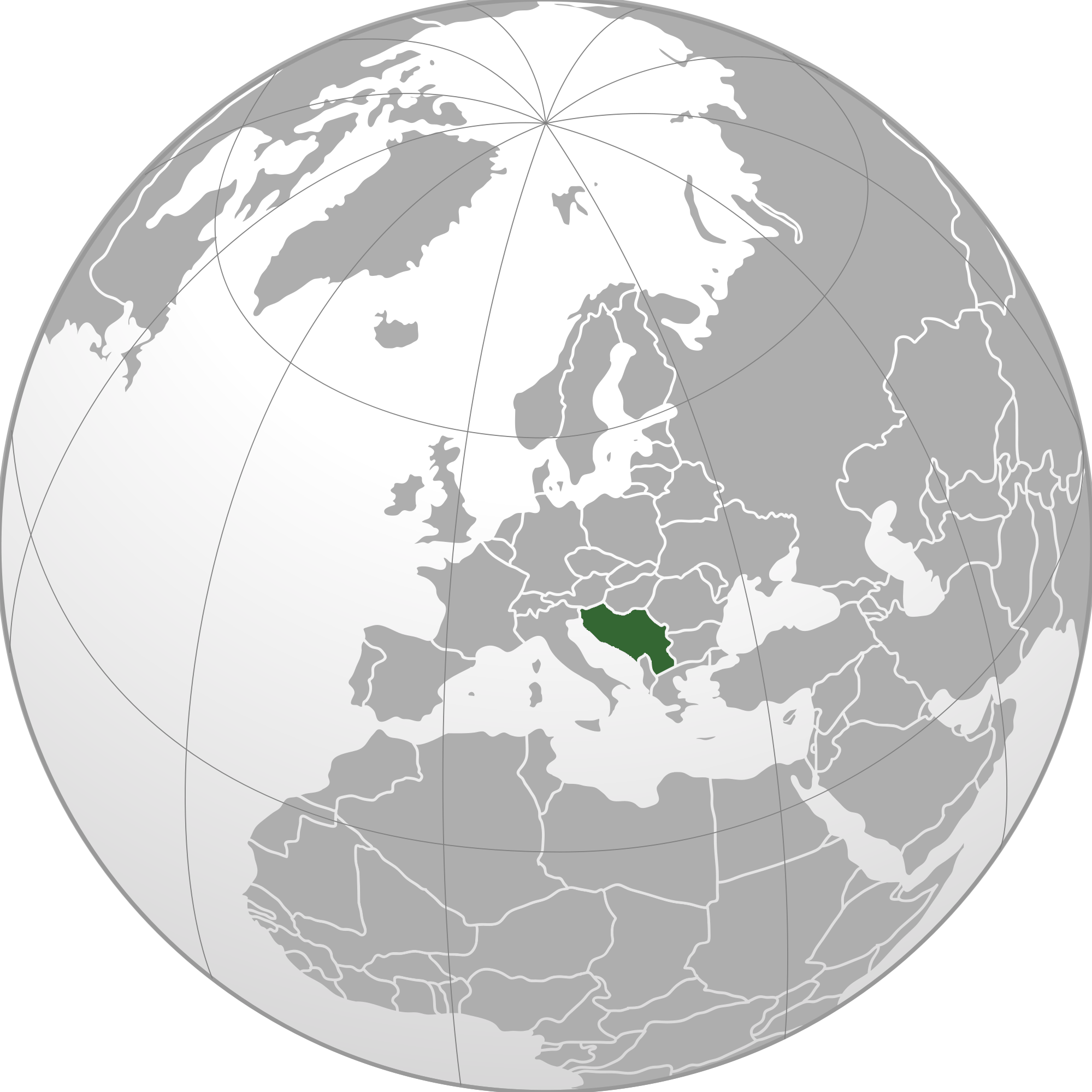
Jamaica and Yugoslavia

Jamaica–Yugoslavia relations were historical foreign relations between Caribbean island nation of Jamaica and now split-up Socialist Federal Republic of Yugoslavia. Two countries established formal diplomatic relations in October 1968. At the time Jamaica was self-restrained in development of formal relations with other European communists states which contrary to Yugoslavia were part of the Eastern Bloc.

In the period between 1969-1974 Ambassador of Yugoslavia to Jamaica and Guyana was prominent Macedonian diplomat and politician and future President of the United Nations General Assembly Lazar Mojsov.

In 5–8 March 1974 Jamaica and Yugoslavia, together with Australia, Guinea, Guyana, Sierra Leone and Suriname signed Agreement Establishing the International Bauxite Association.

Following the breakup of Yugoslavia and Yugoslav Wars judge Patrick Lipton Robinson from Jamaica served as the President of the International Criminal Tribunal for the former Yugoslavia between 2008 and 2011.

== See also ==
- Yugoslavia and the Non-Aligned Movement
- Death and state funeral of Josip Broz Tito
