= Algeria–Kosovo relations =

Algerian–Kosovar relations
- Algeria: Kosovo

Algeria–Kosovo relations are limited. Algeria does not recognize Kosovo as an independent state, which is in line with its general position on territorial integrity and its support for Serbia in this context.

There is, however, no major hostility between them. Algeria has maintained a neutral tone in its diplomacy with Kosovo, while Kosovo, on its part, pursues recognition from Algeria as part of its broad international strategy.

== Recognition ==
Serbian First Deputy Prime Minister and Foreign Minister Ivica Dačić received in 2023 the Algerian Foreign Minister Ahmed Attaf and expressed his gratitude for Algeria's continued support for Serbia's territorial integrity, especially regarding the non-recognition of Kosovo's independence. Dacić pointed out that Algeria is an important factor in international relations, particularly as a non-permanent member of the UN Security Council and expressed Serbia's commitment to taking into account Algeria's interests on regional issues.

The ministers addressed the strengthening of bilateral relations, underlining decades of friendship and the need for more substantial cooperation in defense, culture, education, and sports. Plans were also outlined for high-level visits and the reactivation of the Serbia-Algeria Mixed Cooperation Committee with a view to setting up a framework for deepening relations and increasing trade currently standing at about $200 million.

Algeria does not recognize Kosovo's independence simply because it stands for respect for international law and the support of the territorial integrity of the states. The independence of Kosovo was realized outside this legal framework, according to their view.

== Conflict ==
Although the chances of a conflict between both countries are rare, because the relation between Algeria and Kosovo is neutral.

== See also ==
- Foreign relations of Algeria
- Foreign relations of Kosovo
- Algeria–Serbia relations
- Algeria–Yugoslavia relations
