= Cape Verde–Yugoslavia relations =

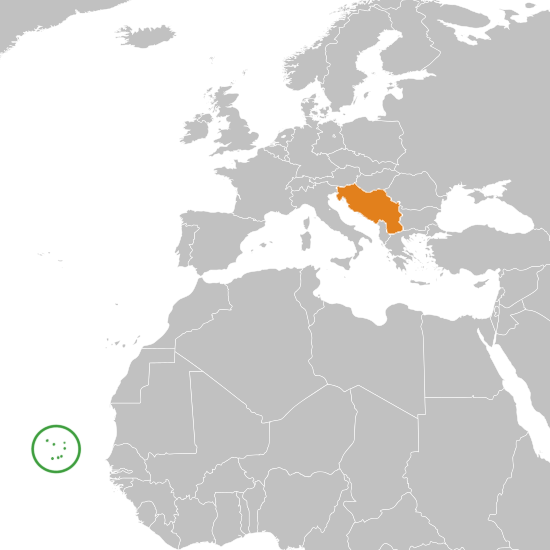

- Cape Verde: Yugoslavia

Cape Verde–Yugoslavia relations were the historical foreign relations between Cape Verde and Yugoslavia. The two countries established formal relations in 1975, though Yugoslav assistance to Cabo Verdean leadership predates the nation's independence from Portugal.

== History ==
Prior to independence, the government of Yugoslavia played an active role in supporting anti-colonial independence movements throughout Portuguese Africa financially and materially. In 1969, a constituent organization within the People's Front of Yugoslavia was established named the Fund for Aid to Victims of Colonial Aggression and Domination, which was charged with collecting and distributing aid to anti-colonial movements. The African Party for the Independence of Guinea and Cape Verde (PAIGC), which waged a guerrilla war against Portuguese colonial authorities in the name of securing the independence (and eventual unity) of Guinea-Bissau and Cape Verde, received considerable aid from Yugoslavia including the construction of facilities, medical aid for fighters, military equipment, and training in political, technical, and military fields. The relationship between Yugoslavia and its African allies was characterized by Marshal Tito as part of a natural continuity of the Yugoslav revolutionary identity, which was forged out of its own history as a colonized country.

Following independence, formal bilateral relations were immediately established between Cape Verde and Yugoslavia, and the two countries cooperated closely with one another politically and economically. In 1978, after a visit by President Aristides Pereira to Belgrade, a new scientific-technical agreement was signed, which included the assignment of additional Yugoslav professionals to Cape Verde and further cooperation in the realms of urban planning, news media, and tourism. The countries continued to enjoy close relations until Yugoslavia's disintegration in 1992.

== See also ==
- Yugoslavia and the Organisation of African Unity
- Yugoslavia and the Non-Aligned Movement
- Angola–Yugoslavia relations
