= Uganda–Yugoslavia relations =

Uganda-Yugoslavia relations
- Uganda: Yugoslavia

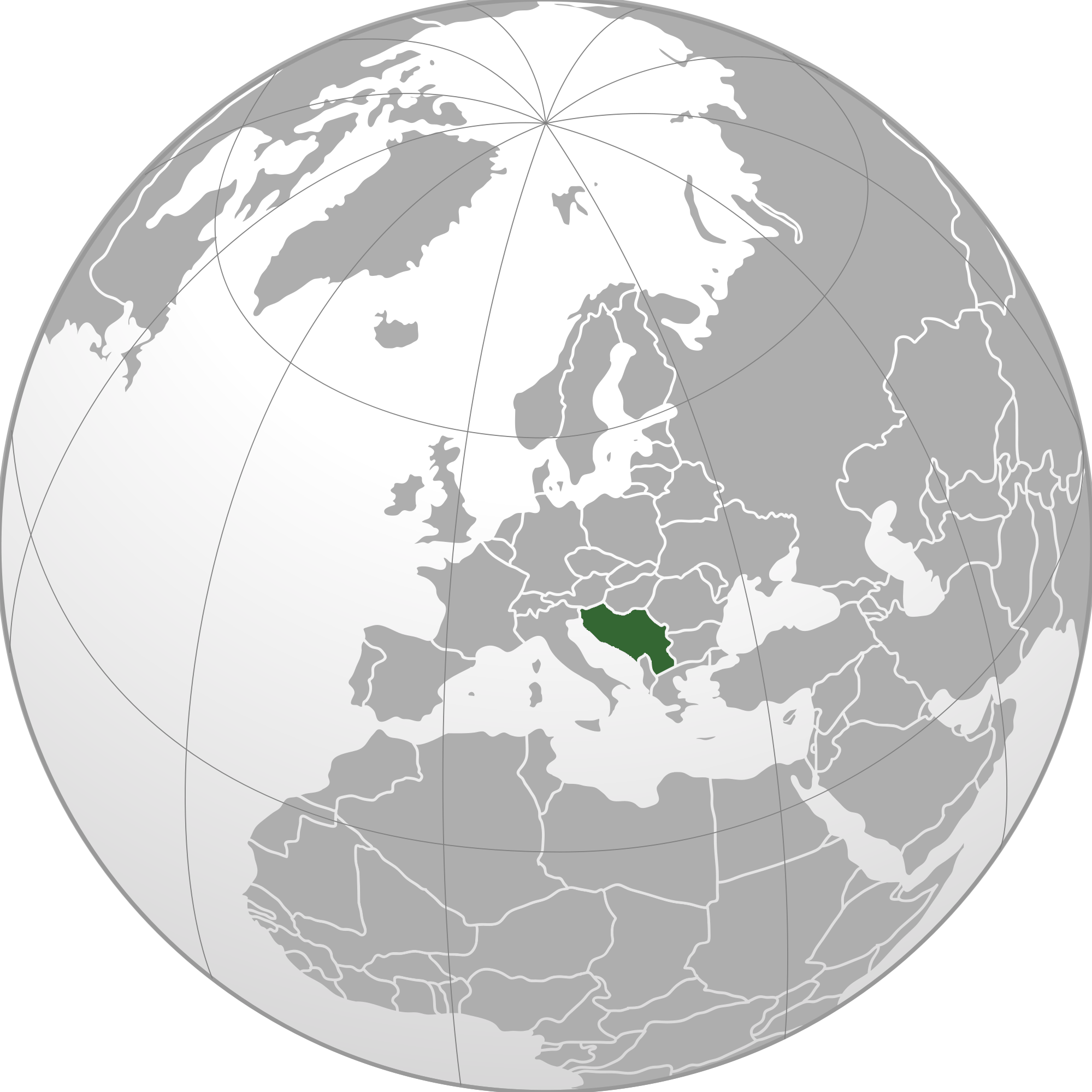
Uganda and Yugoslavia

Uganda–Yugoslavia relations were historical foreign relations between Uganda and now split-up Socialist Federal Republic of Yugoslavia. Formal diplomatic relations between the two countries were established in 1963. Both countries were members of the Non-Aligned Movement and they developed their relations in the framework of the Cold War Third World cooperation. First official state visit between Uganda and Yugoslavia took place in 1965 when the Prime Minister of Uganda Milton Obote visited Yugoslavia. President of Yugoslavia Josip Broz Tito reciprocated the state visit by visiting Uganda on 20 February 1970. President of Uganda Idi Amin visited Yugoslavia between 20–22 April 1976.

In a meeting with the Speaker of the Serbian Parliament Maja Gojković in February 2019 President Yoweri Museveni told that while his country is eager to cooperate he was at the same time "very sorry about what took place in the former Yugoslavia" referring to the process of the violent breakup during the Yugoslav Wars.

== History ==
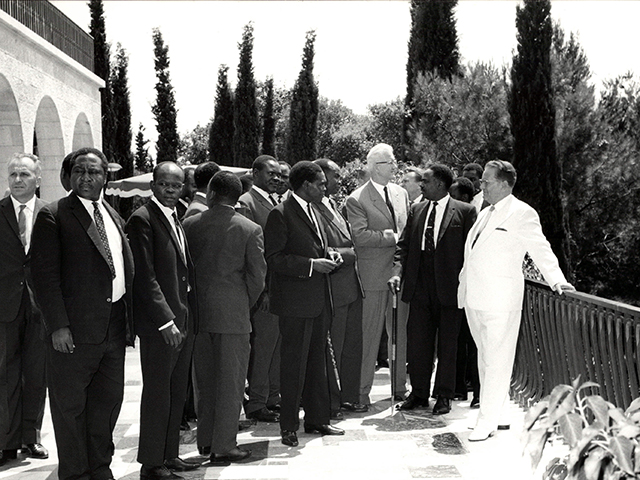
Prime Minister of Uganda Milton Obote reception by President of Yugoslavia Josip Broz Tito on Brijuni islands (SR Croatia) on 9 July 1965.

Yugoslav organizations had maintained close relations with Uganda’s liberation movement before the independence of the Uganda Protectorate. Relations were firstly established with the Uganda National Congress (UNC) and later with the Uganda People's Congress (UPC).

Following the independence two countries developed economic and cultural cooperation. Prominent example of Yugoslav construction in Uganda include 1970's new main terminal building at the Entebbe International Airport and the International Conference Center at Serena Hotel in Kampala.

== See also ==
- Yugoslavia and the Non-Aligned Movement
- Yugoslavia and the Organisation of African Unity
- Museum of African Art, Belgrade
- Archives of Yugoslavia
- Death and state funeral of Josip Broz Tito
