= Democratic Republic of the Congo–Kosovo relations =

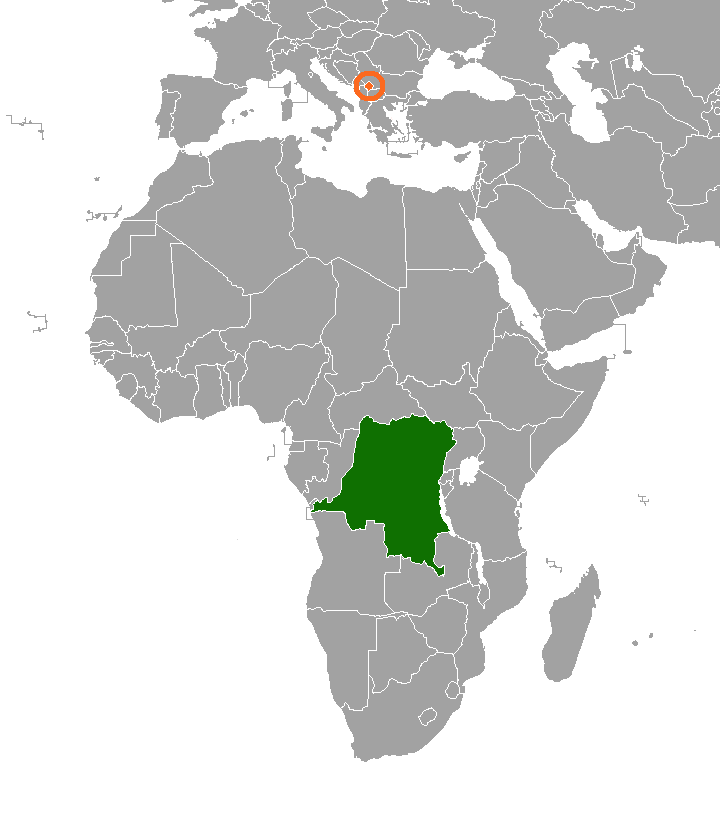
- DR Congo: Kosovo

Democratic Republic of the Congo–Kosovo relations are foreign relations between the Democratic Republic of the Congo and Kosovo. Formal diplomatic relations between the two states have not been established as the Democratic Republic of the Congo has not recognized Kosovo as a sovereign state.

== History ==
On 10 February 2009, the Head of the International Organizations Directorate at the Congolese Foreign Ministry, Alice Kimpembe Bamba, said that her government had no plans to recognise Kosovo at the moment, adding that her government was closely following developments on Kosovo at the United Nations. In November 2009, it was reported that the President of the Democratic Republic of the Congo Joseph Kabila had said that his country would not recognise the independence of Kosovo for as long as he lived.

On 6 April 2012, the Congolese National Assembly Speaker, Evariste Boshab Mabudj-ma-Bilenge, said that "Serbia's position on Kosovo and Metohija is the Democratic Republic of Congo's position".

In September 2013 the Minister of Foreign Affairs of the DR Congo, Raymond Tshibanda, stated that he would suggest to the Congolese President that they recognise Kosovo.

== See also ==
- Democratic Republic of the Congo–Yugoslavia relations
- Foreign relations of the Democratic Republic of the Congo
- Foreign relations of Kosovo
