= Sierra Leone–Yugoslavia relations =

Sierra Leone-Yugoslavia relations
- Sierra Leone: Yugoslavia

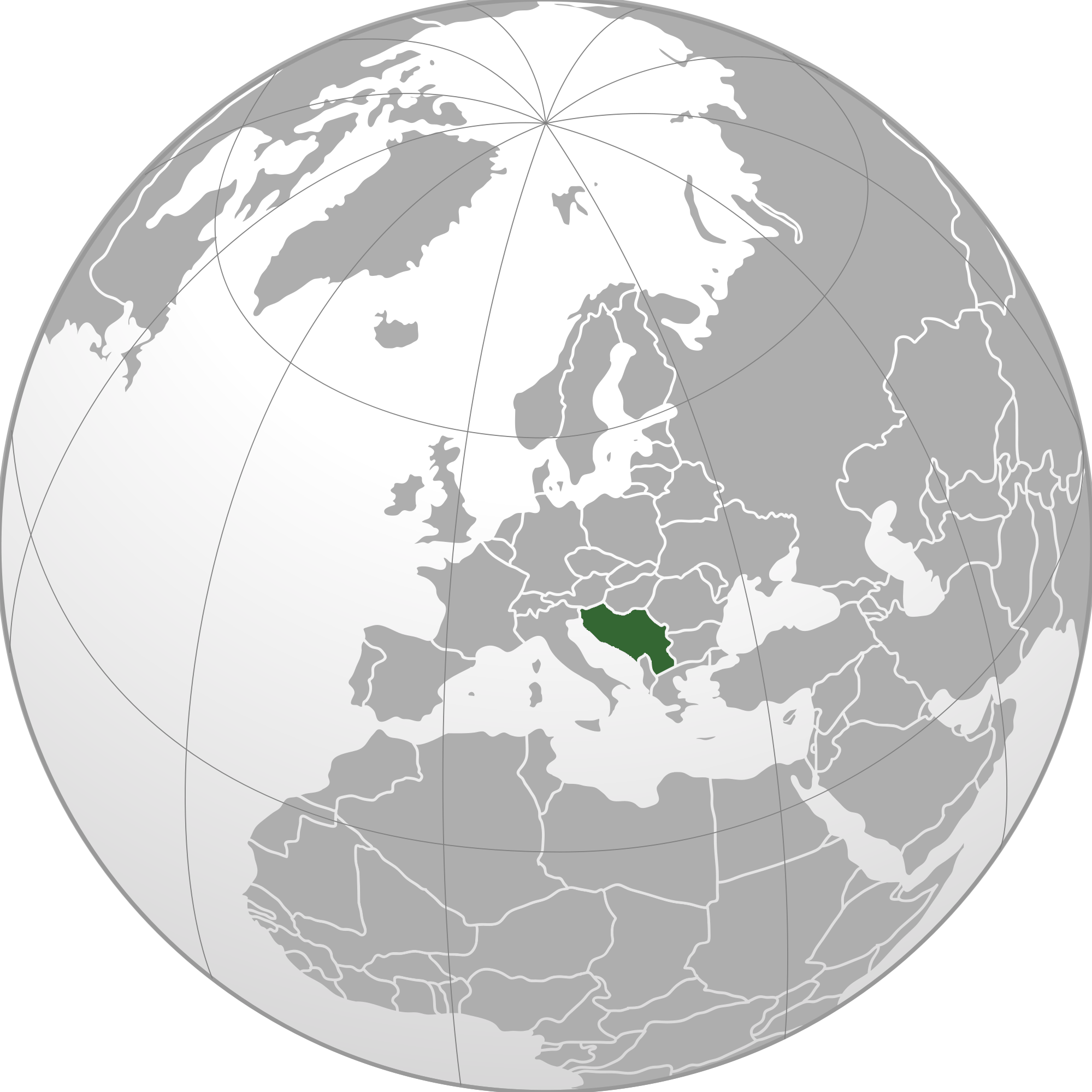
Sierra Leone and Yugoslavia

Sierra Leone–Yugoslavia relations were historical foreign relations between Sierra Leone and now split-up Socialist Federal Republic of Yugoslavia. Two countries established formal diplomatic relations in 1961. Both countries were member states of the Non-Aligned Movement and cooperated in the United Nations in bridging the Cold War divisions. Two countries reached the peak of their diplomatic relations in cooperation on the issue of Rhodesia.

== History ==
Just a couple of months after the independence of Sierra Leone Yugoslavia became one of 17 original members of the Special Committee on Decolonization where its representative Miša Pavićević urged the General Assembly to push United Kingdom to give independence to its remaining colonies. Sierra Leone and Yugoslavia subsequently cooperated in the pursuance of decolonization policies.

=== Sub-Committee on Southern Rhodesia ===
I 1964 Special Committee on Decolonization (C-24) established five-member Sub-Committee on Southern Rhodesia which included Ethiopia, Sierra Leone, Mali, Yugoslavia and United Nations secretary of the sub-committee. Sub-Committee on Southern Rhodesia held its meetings in London between May 30 and June 5 and submitted its Report to the C-24 on June 22 in which it criticized British unwillingness to cooperate with the United Nations and to take an active role in resolution of the Southern Rhodesia situation. British unwillingness was caused by London's position that Southern Rhodesia is a self-governing entity.

In 1971 in Freetown two countries signed the 2 years Program of Technical Cooperation. In August of the same year Džemal Bijedić received Sierra Leonese delegation led by the minister of finances, minister of foreign affairs and minister of public works.

=== The end of the Cold War ===
At the end of the Cold War both countries faced military conflict with Sierra Leone Civil War (1991–2002) and Yugoslav Wars (1991–2002) which led to Breakup of Yugoslavia. Those conflicts subsequently influenced writings of Scottish and Sierra Leonean writer Aminatta Forna whose novels were translated into Serbo-Croatian in Bosnia and Croatia.

== See also ==
- Yugoslavia and the Non-Aligned Movement
- Yugoslavia and the Organisation of African Unity
- Yugoslavia–Zimbabwe relations
- Yugoslav Wars
- United Nations Protection Force
  - United Nations Confidence Restoration Operation in Croatia
  - United Nations Mission in Bosnia and Herzegovina
  - United Nations Transitional Administration for Eastern Slavonia, Baranja and Western Sirmium
  - United Nations Mission of Observers in Prevlaka
  - United Nations Preventive Deployment Force
- International Criminal Tribunal for the former Yugoslavia
- Sierra Leone Civil War
- United Nations Mission in Sierra Leone
- Special Court for Sierra Leone
- Death and state funeral of Josip Broz Tito
