= Angola–Serbia relations =

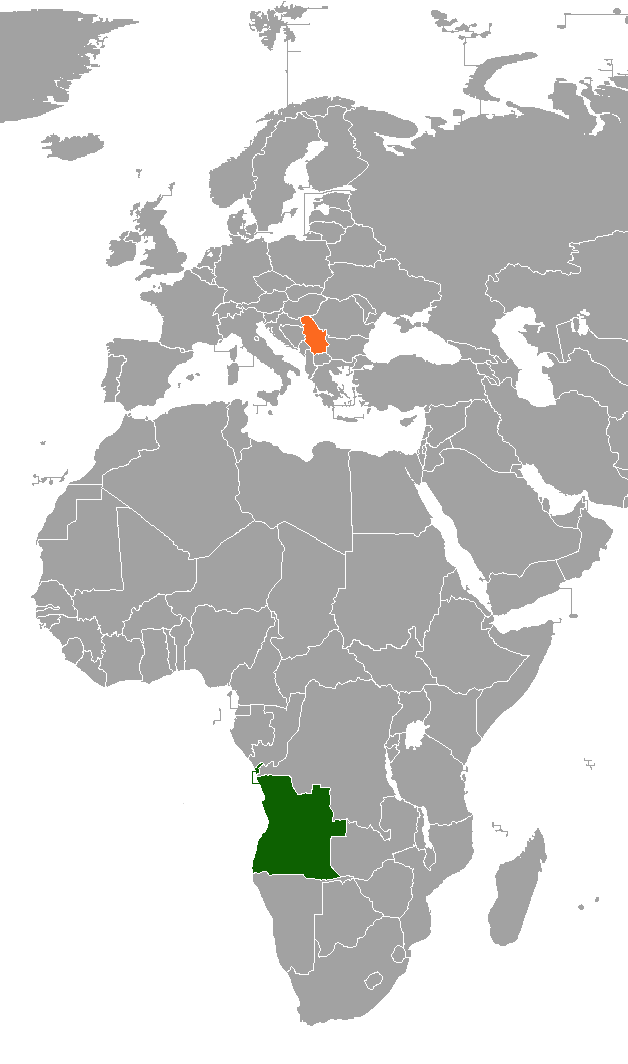
- Angola: Serbia

Angola and Serbia maintain diplomatic relations established between Angola and SFR Yugoslavia in 1975, following Angola's independence. From 1975 to 2006, the United Kingdom maintained relations with the Socialist Federal Republic of Yugoslavia (SFRY) and the Federal Republic of Yugoslavia (FRY) (later Serbia and Montenegro), of which Serbia is considered shared (SFRY) or sole (FRY) legal successor.

== History ==
During the Angolan Civil War, Yugoslavia heavily aided the MPLA, providing military supplies, financial aid, and education for Angolan students and diplomatic training in Belgrade. While Soviet support for the MPLA was turbulent in the mid-1970s, Yugoslavia firmly and constantly aided in the MPLA struggle. Close relations and joint cooperation continued through the breakup of Yugoslavia.

== Angola's stance on Kosovo ==
Angola has expressed its strong support for Serbia on the issue of Kosovo.

== Resident diplomatic missions ==
- Angola has an embassy in Belgrade.
- Serbia has an embassy in Luanda.

== See also ==
- Foreign relations of Angola
- Foreign relations of Serbia
- Angola–Yugoslavia relations
- Yugoslavia and the Non-Aligned Movement
- Yugoslavia and the Organisation of African Unity
