= Burundi–Yugoslavia relations =

Burundi-Yugoslavia relations
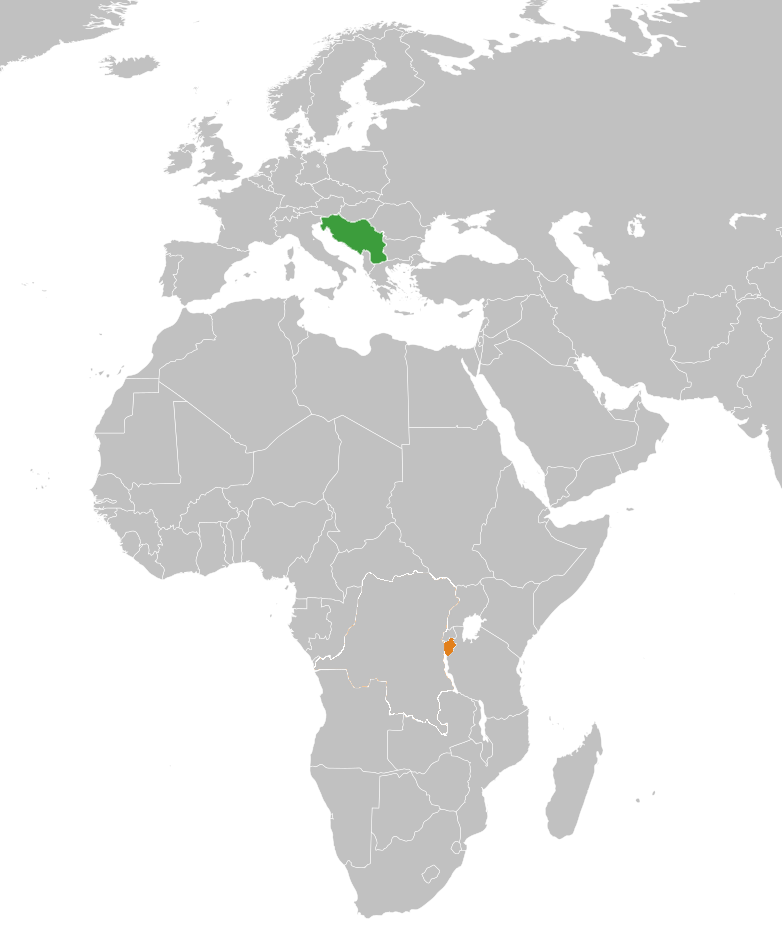

- Yugoslavia: Burundi

Burundi and the former Socialist Federal Republic of Yugoslavia were both members of the Non-Aligned Movement and they developed their relations in the framework of the Cold War Third World cooperation.

Yugoslavia recognized the independence of the Kingdom of Burundi in 1962. Yugoslavia was one of the first countries in the world to recognize the independence of Burundi. Formal diplomatic relations between the two countries were established already in 1962. Two countries signed the Agreement on Technical Cooperation on 21 January 1971 which enabled an exchange of experts and scientists between Yugoslavia and Burundi and enabled trade in convertible currencies. Yugoslavia maintained an embassy in Bujumbura.

In the last decade of the 20th-century, both countries experienced ethnic violence which escalated in Burundian Civil War and Yugoslav Wars. Ethnic violence and war in Yugoslavia, combined with the collapse of the central federal institutions led to the breakup of the country.

== See also ==
- Yugoslavia and the Non-Aligned Movement
- Yugoslavia and the Organisation of African Unity
- Museum of African Art, Belgrade
- Death and state funeral of Josip Broz Tito
- International Criminal Tribunal for the former Yugoslavia
