= Serbia–Zimbabwe relations =

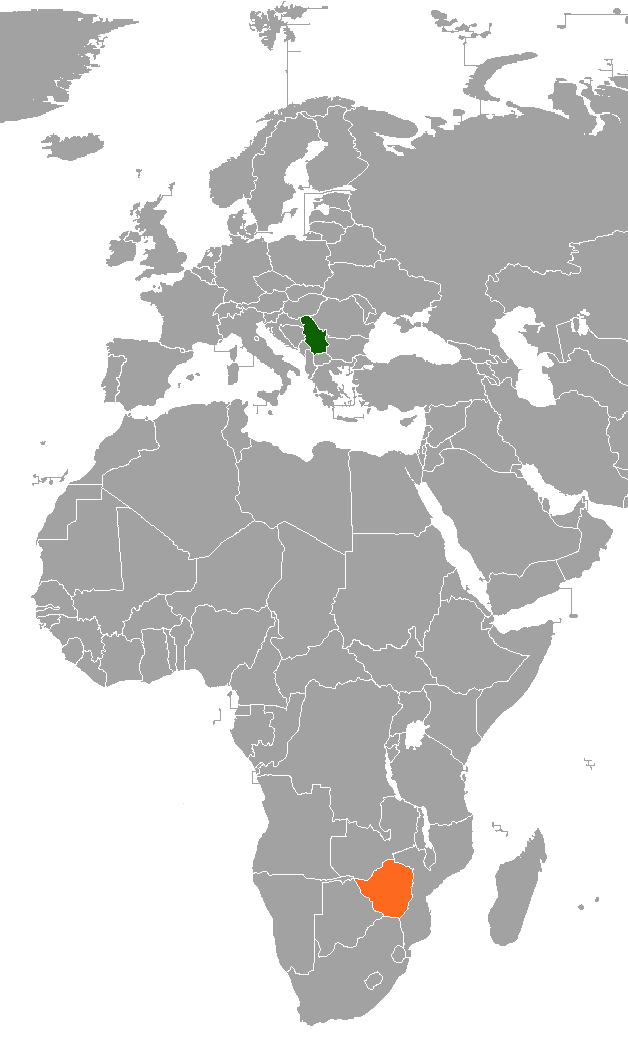

- Serbia: Zimbabwe

Serbia and Zimbabwe maintain diplomatic relations established between SFR Yugoslavia and Zimbabwe in 1980, following Zimbabwe's independence. From 1980 to 2006, Zimbabwe maintained relations with the Socialist Federal Republic of Yugoslavia (SFRY) and the Federal Republic of Yugoslavia (FRY) (later Serbia and Montenegro), of which Serbia is considered shared (SFRY) or sole (FRY) legal successor.

== History ==
Yugoslavia was a founding member of the Non-Aligned Movement, of which Zimbabwe is also a part.

The conference center built in 1985 for the 1986 Non-Aligned Movement Summit in Zimbabwe was built by Serbian company Energoprojekt holding, as was Mugabe's personal home. Robert Mugabe met Yugoslav President Josip Broz Tito in Brijuni, Yugoslavia, and again in Havana, Cuba in 1979. When Tito died in 1980, Mugabe and a state delegation attended his funeral. Mugabe described Yugoslavia as the nation other non-aligned countries, especially African nations, went to for economic and technological needs.

In 2014, Zimbabwean President Robert Mugabe expressed his desire to rebuild and continue the friendship between Serbia and Zimbabwe, and described Serbia as the "only country in the world that [Zimbabwe] can consider a perfect friend," and that Serbia is Zimbabwe's only foreign ally. Mugabe also invited Serbian minister Ivan Mrkić to Zimbabwe to begin talks on joint projects in the fields of infrastructure, agriculture, information technology and mining.

The Minister of Foreign Affairs of Serbia, Ivica Dačić attended the state funeral of the former President of Zimbabwe, Robert Mugabe, in 2019.

The Speaker of the National Assembly of Zimbabwe, Jacob Mudenda, and the President of the Senate, Mabel Chinomona, participated in the 141st Assembly of the Inter-Parliamentary Union (IPU), which was held in 2019 in Belgrade.

In 2021, Serbian Minister of Foreign Affairs Nikola Selakovic visited Zimbabwe and met with his Zimbabwean counterpart Frederick Shava.

== Economic relations ==
Trade between two countries amounted to $5 million in 2022, primarily consisting of Serbian merchandise export.

== Resident diplomatic missions ==
Serbia had an embassy in Harare from 1980 to 2001 and re-opened it in 2022.

Zimbabwe closed its embassy in Belgrade in 2006.

== See also ==
- Foreign relations of Serbia
- Foreign relations of Zimbabwe
- Yugoslavia and the Non-Aligned Movement
- Yugoslavia and the Organisation of African Unity
