= Tanzania–Yugoslavia relations =

Tanganyika–Yugoslavia relations
- Tanganyika: Yugoslavia

Tanzania–Yugoslavia relations
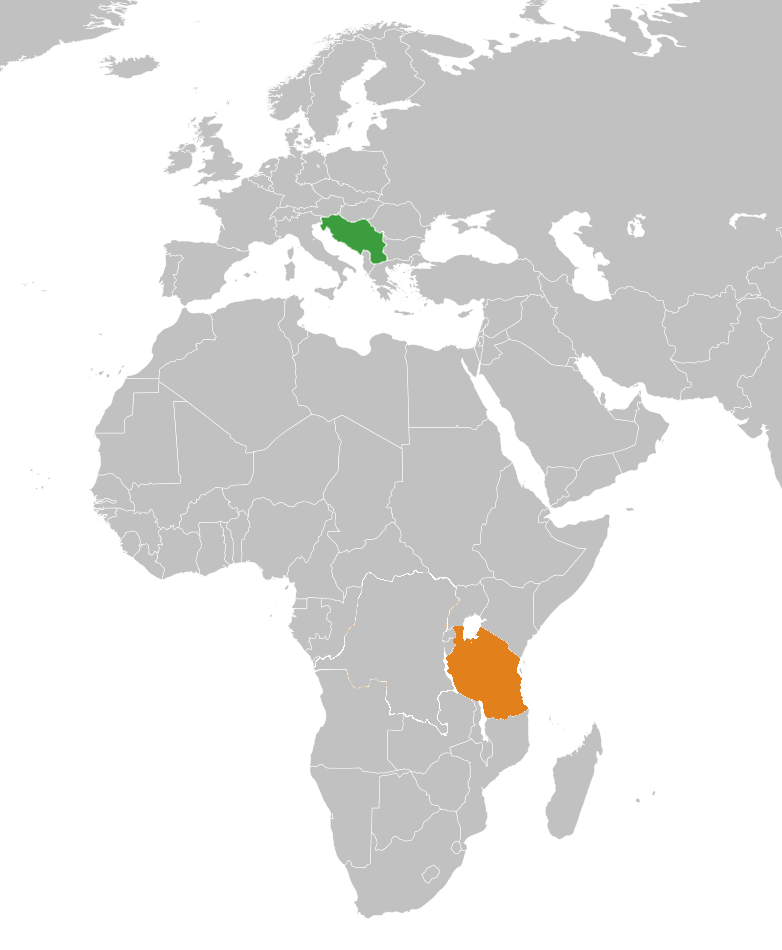

- Yugoslavia: Tanzania

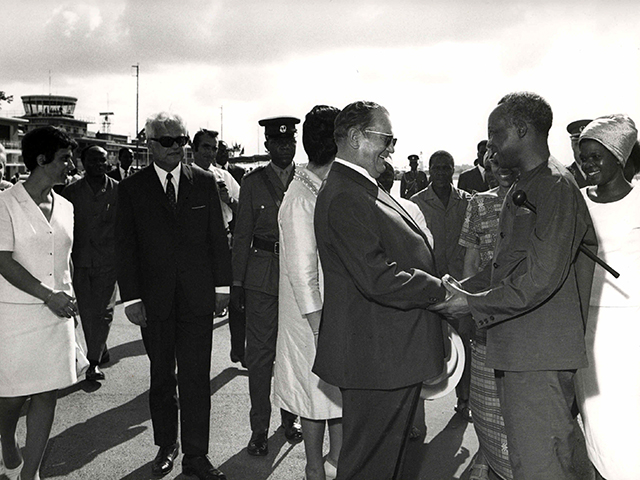
President Josip Broz Tito at the end of his 1970 visit to Tanzania.

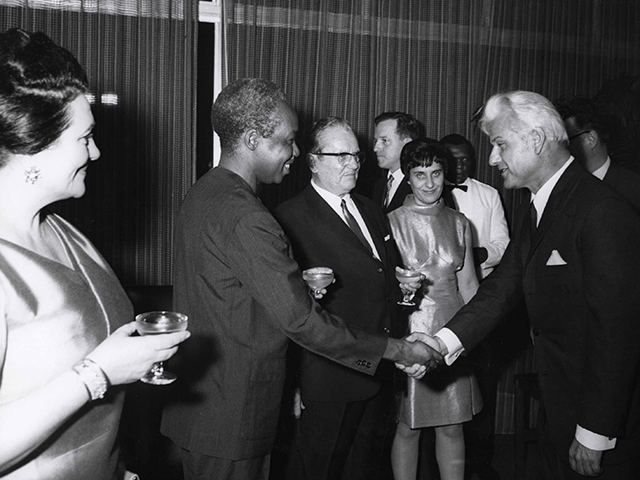
1970 visit to Dar es Salaam

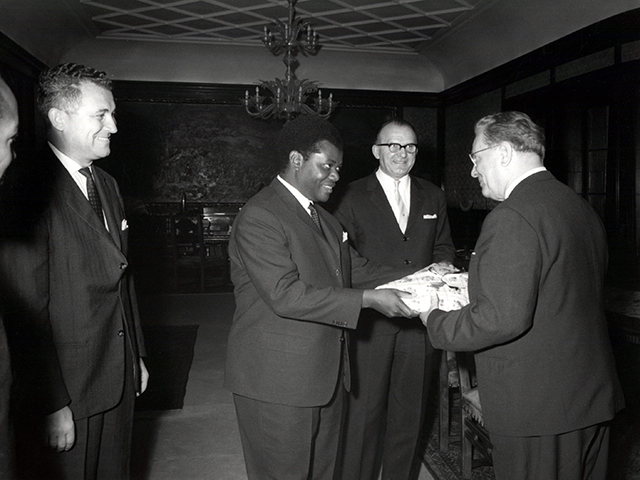
Oscar Kambona with President Tito in Belgrade in 1964

Tanzania–Yugoslavia relations were historical foreign relations between Tanzania and now split-up Socialist Federal Republic of Yugoslavia. During the Cold War both countries actively participated in the work of the Non-Aligned Movement. President of Yugoslavia Josip Broz Tito visited Tanzania in 1970 while President of Tanzania Julius Nyerere visited Yugoslavia on three occasions in 1961, 1969 and in 1975. 1961 visit to Yugoslavia was the first official international visit by Nyerere and it took place even before the formal independence was declared later that year.

Initial contacts between the two sides originate from the period before the independence of Tanganyika when the Government of Yugoslavia provided political, moral and material support to the liberation movement. Krsto Popivoda, Member of the Federal Executive Council, attended the formal proclamation of independence of Tanganyika on 9 December 1961. While Yugoslavia expressed reservations and critical comments on Uganda–Tanzania War it still provided military aid to Tanzania which was not granted to Uganda. Yugoslavia also refused comparison of Tanzanian intervention in Uganda with Cambodian–Vietnamese War.

Two countries expanded their economic cooperation as the development alternative to dependence on the former colonial powers or Cold War superpowers. Yugoslavia initiated soy production in Tanzania, donated 5,000 tones of corn, funded 660,000 US dollars for mineral research, provided advice on textile production in Tuaza, created electrification projects and donated 3 million dollars for Youth Camp in Zanzibar while 1,6 million US dollars was determined for the food quality laboratory.

Dissolution of Yugoslavia and Yugoslav Wars led to interruption in bilateral relations as the Yugoslav successor states were faced with reconstruction and diplomatic emancipation challenges. Judge William H. Sekule from Tanzania served at the International Criminal Tribunal for the former Yugoslavia between 2013 and 2015.

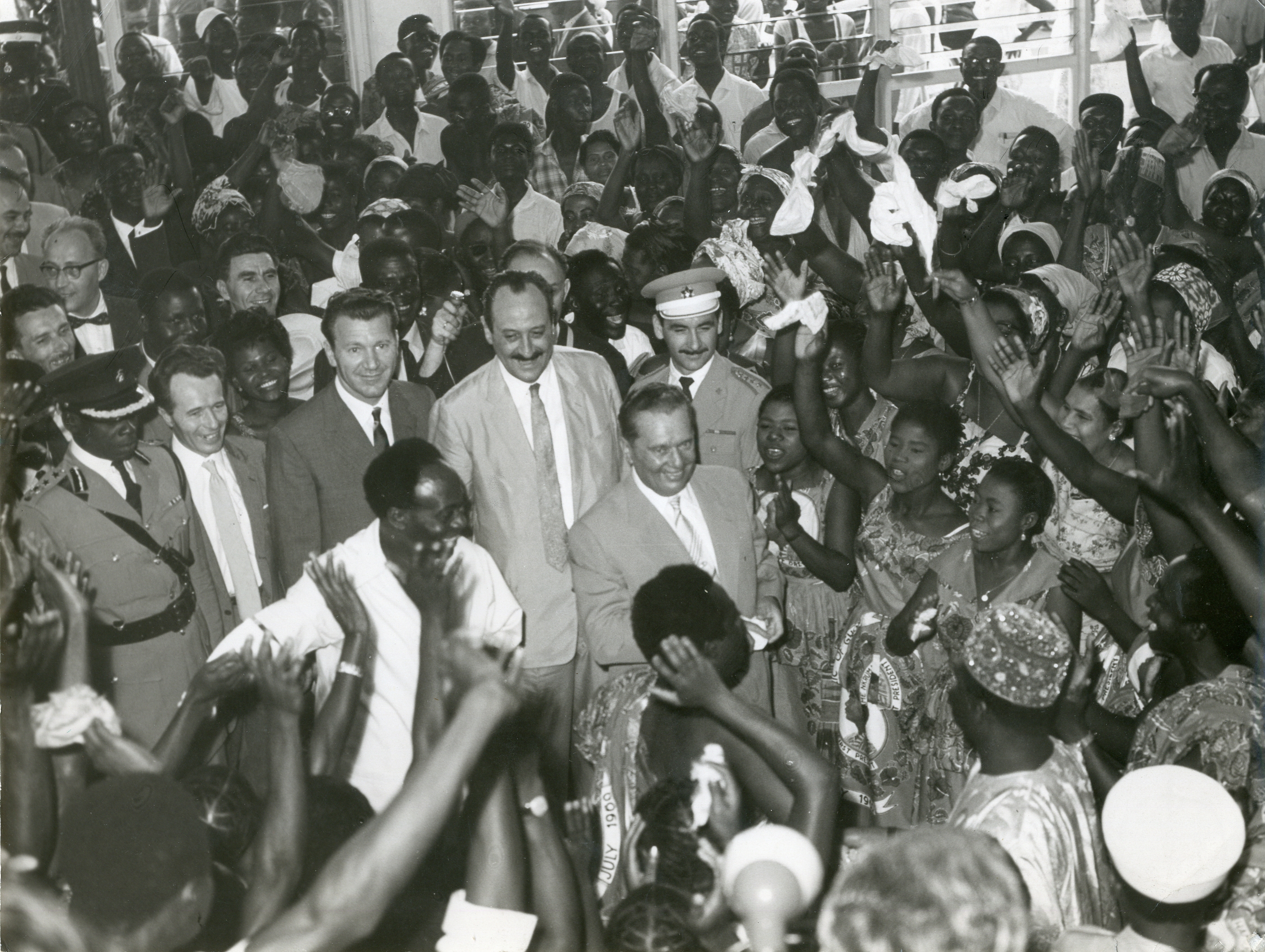

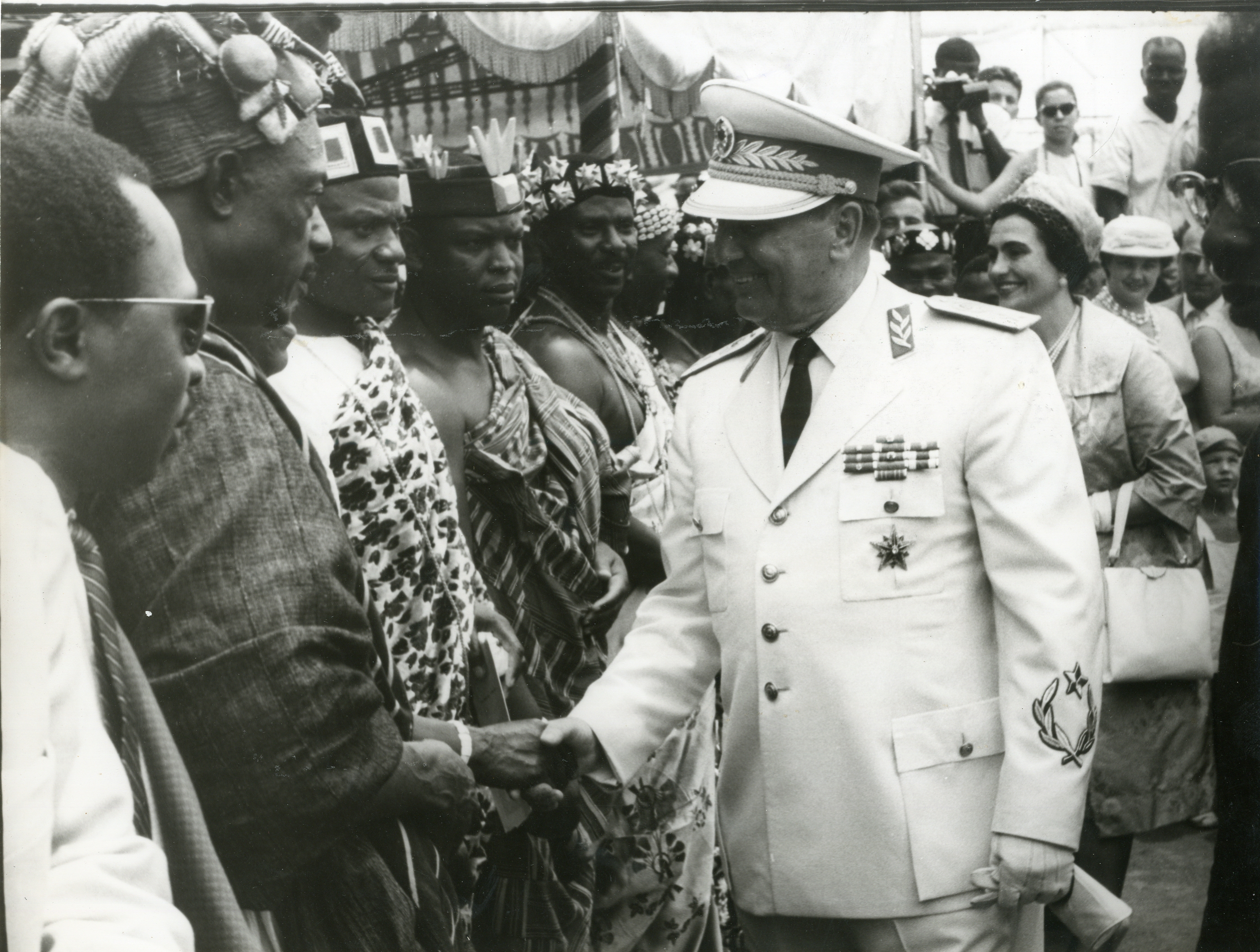

== See also ==
- Yugoslavia and the Non-Aligned Movement
- Yugoslavia and the Organisation of African Unity
- Death and state funeral of Josip Broz Tito
