= Republic of the Congo–Yugoslavia relations =

- Congo: Yugoslavia

People's Republic of the Congo–Yugoslavia relations
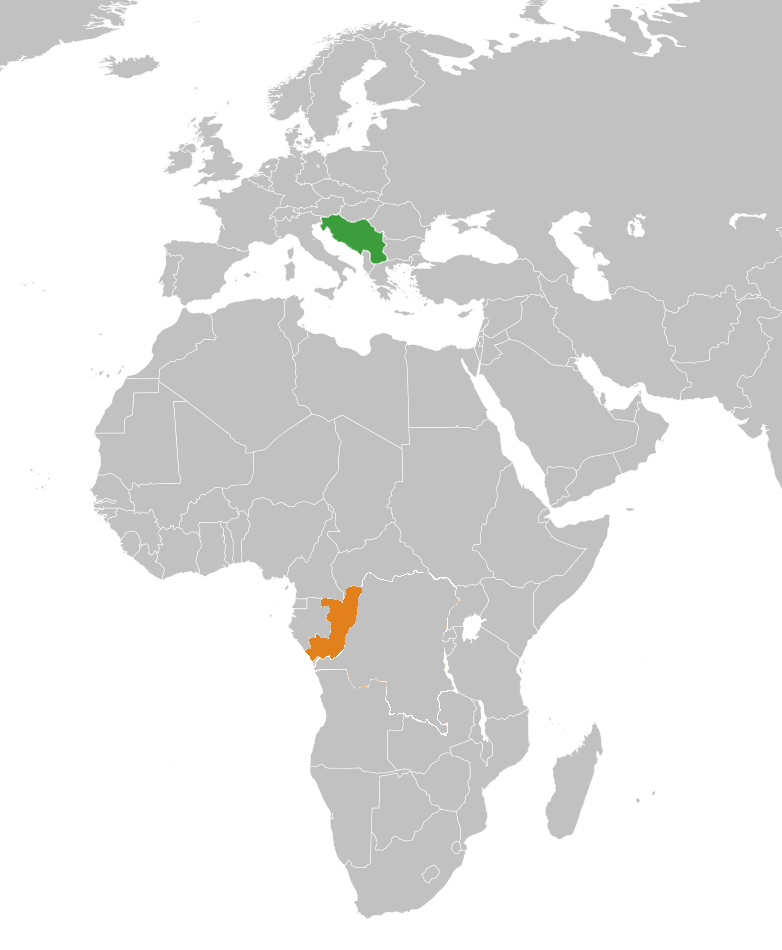

- Yugoslavia: Congo

Republic of the Congo–Yugoslavia relations were historical foreign relations between Republic of the Congo (1958–1969) or People's Republic of the Congo (1969–1992) and now split-up Socialist Federal Republic of Yugoslavia. Formal diplomatic relations between the two countries were established in 1964.

Both countries were active members of the Non-Aligned Movement during the Cold War. Within the Non-Aligned Movement which included a large number of participating states Yugoslavia and Congo belonged to different sub-groupings. Yugoslavia belonged to the movements self-described core members which advocated for equidistance towards both blocs during the Cold War, while Congo belonged to the group of self-described progressive members which promoted thesis of the natural identity of interest between Soviet socialism and colonial people of Africa and Asia independence struggle. This difference however did not prevent development of diplomatic relations between the two countries. Yugoslavia was represented in the Republic of the Congo via its embassy in Brazzaville.

Two countries cooperated beyond the framework of the Non-Aligned Movement. During the Emergency Session of the United Nations General Assembly Yugoslavia proposed 29 Draft Resolution reacting to the Six-Day War which was co-sponsored by fourteen member states including Congo (Brazzaville). Presidents of the People's Republic of the Congo Marien Ngouabi officially visited Yugoslavia on 10–12 September 1975.

Two countries established cooperation in various fields including in culture where Yugoslav Filmske novosti reached a significant level of cooperation of a scientific, technical and cultural nature. This lasting cooperation formed an extensive archive as well as Filmske novosti school that was attended by future camera operators and editors from African countries who later shaped their national cinema. The first formal two years long cultural collaboration program between the two countries was signed in 1968.

== See also ==
- Tito-Stalin split
- Yugoslavia and the Non-Aligned Movement
- Yugoslavia and the Organisation of African Unity
- Death and state funeral of Josip Broz Tito
- Yugoslav Wars
- Republic of the Congo Civil War (1993–1994)
- Republic of the Congo Civil War (1997–1999)
