= Gabon–Yugoslavia relations =

Gabon-Yugoslavia relations
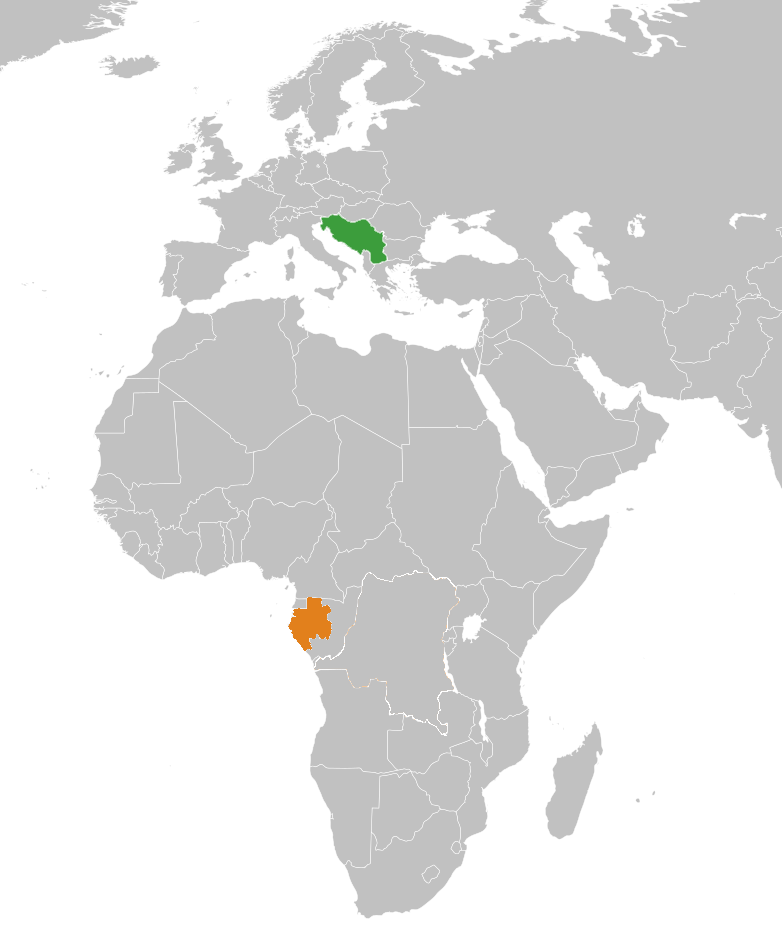

- Yugoslavia: Gabon

Yugoslavia developed relations with Gabon as a part of its prominent and active involvement in the Non-Aligned Movement. Formal diplomatic relations between the two countries were established in 1960.

President of Gabon Omar Bongo visited Yugoslavia between 6 and 9 April 1975. Palais de conferences in Gabonian capital Libreville was completed in 1977 by engineers and architects of the Belgrade construction firm Energoprojekt. The building was constructed to accommodate the 14th Summit of the Organization of African Unity in 1977. The Conference Palace was demolished in 2014 to make way for a new complex for the president of Gabon. Yugoslav architects worked on other buildings in the country, including government complex, television and hospital buildings and other infrastructure.

At the time of the beginning of Yugoslav Wars Gabon informed the United Nations that it neither produces nor export any weapons and that country therefore intend to fully comply with the United Nations Security Council Resolution 724.

== See also ==
- Yugoslavia and the Non-Aligned Movement
- Yugoslavia and the Organisation of African Unity
- Death and state funeral of Josip Broz Tito
