= Morocco–Yugoslavia relations =

Morocco-Yugoslavia relations
- Morocco: Yugoslavia

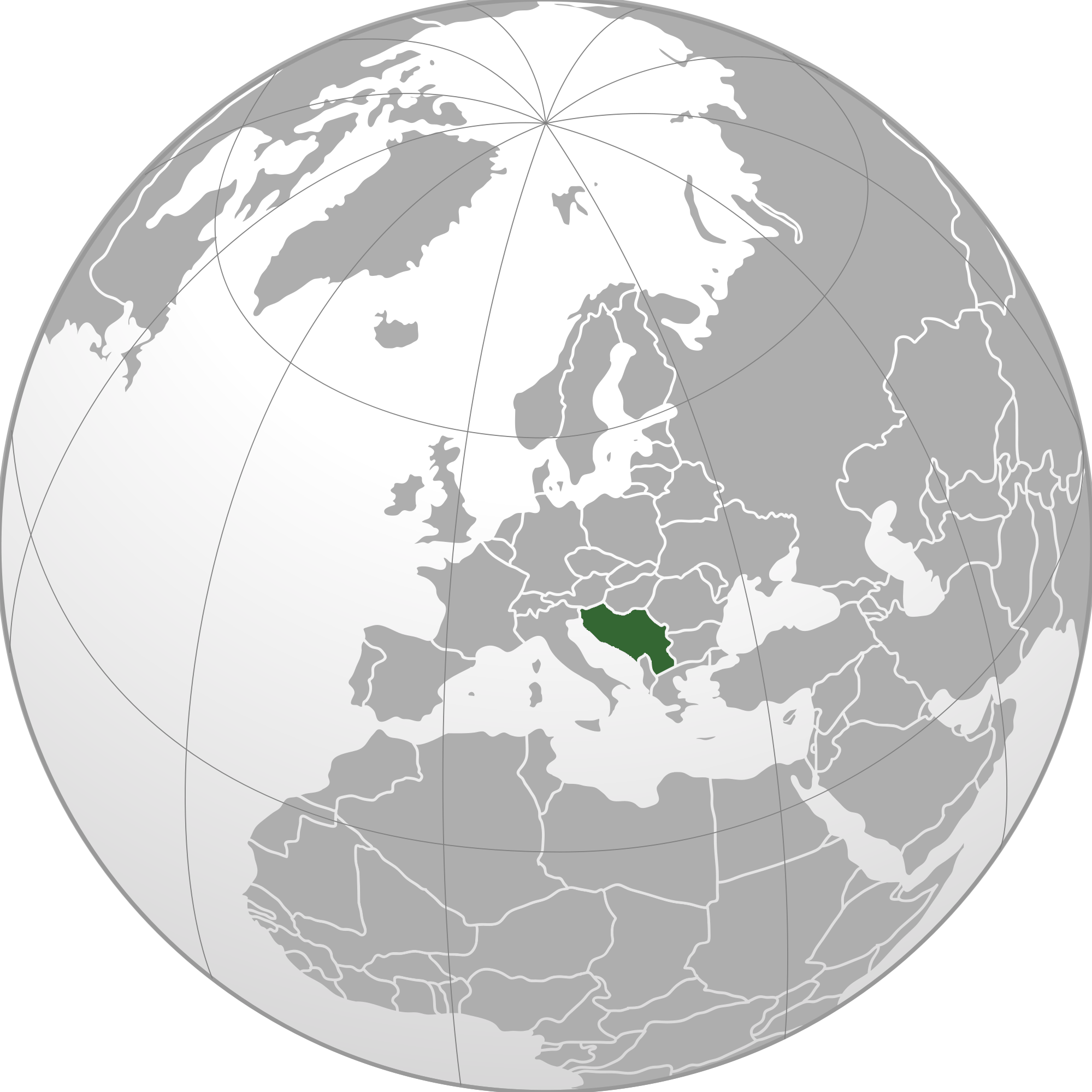
Morocco and Yugoslavia

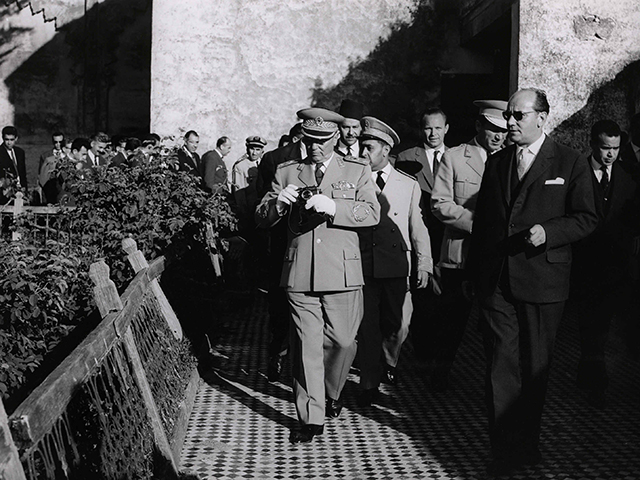
Josip Broz Tito in Meknes in 1961

Morocco and the now-defunct Socialist Federal Republic of Yugoslavia established formal bilateral relations on 2 March 1957.

Both countries were founding members of the Non-Aligned Movement (NAM). Moroccan king Hassan II supported Yugoslavia's bid to host the first NAM conference in 1961. The belief was that Yugoslav bid will "increase the possibility of wider Arab participation" irrespective of some internal divisions. Yugoslav diplomacy on its part gave high priority to the country's relations with non-NAM Mediterranean countries.

== Western Sahara conflict ==
Relations between the two countries, while initially friendly, suffered from the unresolved issue of the Western Sahara conflict which gained prominence among NAM members, including some of the major Yugoslav partners. As Yugoslavia was the first European country to recognize the independence of Algeria, some NAM member states intended to pressure Belgrade to also become the first in Europe to recognize the Sahrawi Arab Democratic Republic (SADR). During a visit by a Polisario Front delegation to Belgrade led by Mustafa Ould Salek, Minister of Foreign Affairs of Yugoslavia Miloš Minić excused President Josip Broz Tito from the meeting due to his heavy workload burden. Minić and Tito subsequently met Prime Minister of Morocco Maati Bouabid and discussed the Western Sahara issue. While the Yugoslav delegation showed some dissatisfaction with perceived Moroccan rigidity over the issue, the Moroccan delegation appreciated the friendly atmosphere in which concerns were raised.

On 28 November 1984, Yugoslavia formally recognized the SADR, making it the 61st country and the first one in Europe to do so. Diplomatic relations between Morocco and Yugoslavia were subsequently ruptured for four years. Following the breakup of Yugoslavia, its recognition of the SADR was withdrawn by the government of Serbia and Montenegro in the early 2000s, which led to a continued development of relations between Morocco and Serbia, based over the shared views on the status of Western Sahara and of Kosovo.

== List of bilateral state visits ==
=== Yugoslav visits to Morocco ===
- 1-6 March 1961: President Josip Broz Tito

== See also ==
- Yugoslavia and the Non-Aligned Movement
- Yugoslavia and the Organisation of African Unity
- Morocco–European Union relations
- Yugoslavia–European Communities relations
- Mediterranean Games
- Agadir Crisis
- July Crisis
- Morocco in the Eurovision Song Contest
- Yugoslavia in the Eurovision Song Contest
- Morocco at the 1984 Winter Olympics
