= Yugoslavia–Zambia relations =

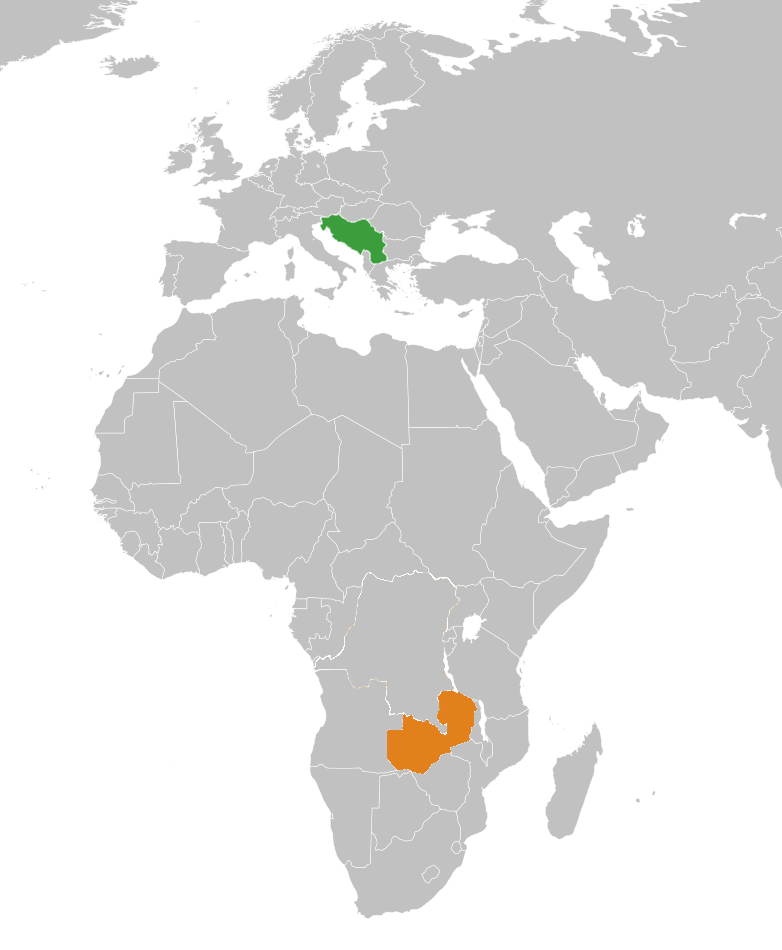

- Yugoslavia: Zambia

Yugoslavia–Zambia relations were historical foreign relations between now split-up Socialist Federal Republic of Yugoslavia and Zambia. Relations developed and were focused around shared membership and participation in the Non-Aligned Movement activities. Diplomatic relations between Yugoslavia and Zambia were established on 24 October 1964. They reached their peak before and during the 1970 3rd conference of Heads of State or Government of the Non-Aligned Countries in Lusaka when Yugoslavia provided major logistical and diplomatic support to the relatively recently decolonized Zambia.

== History ==
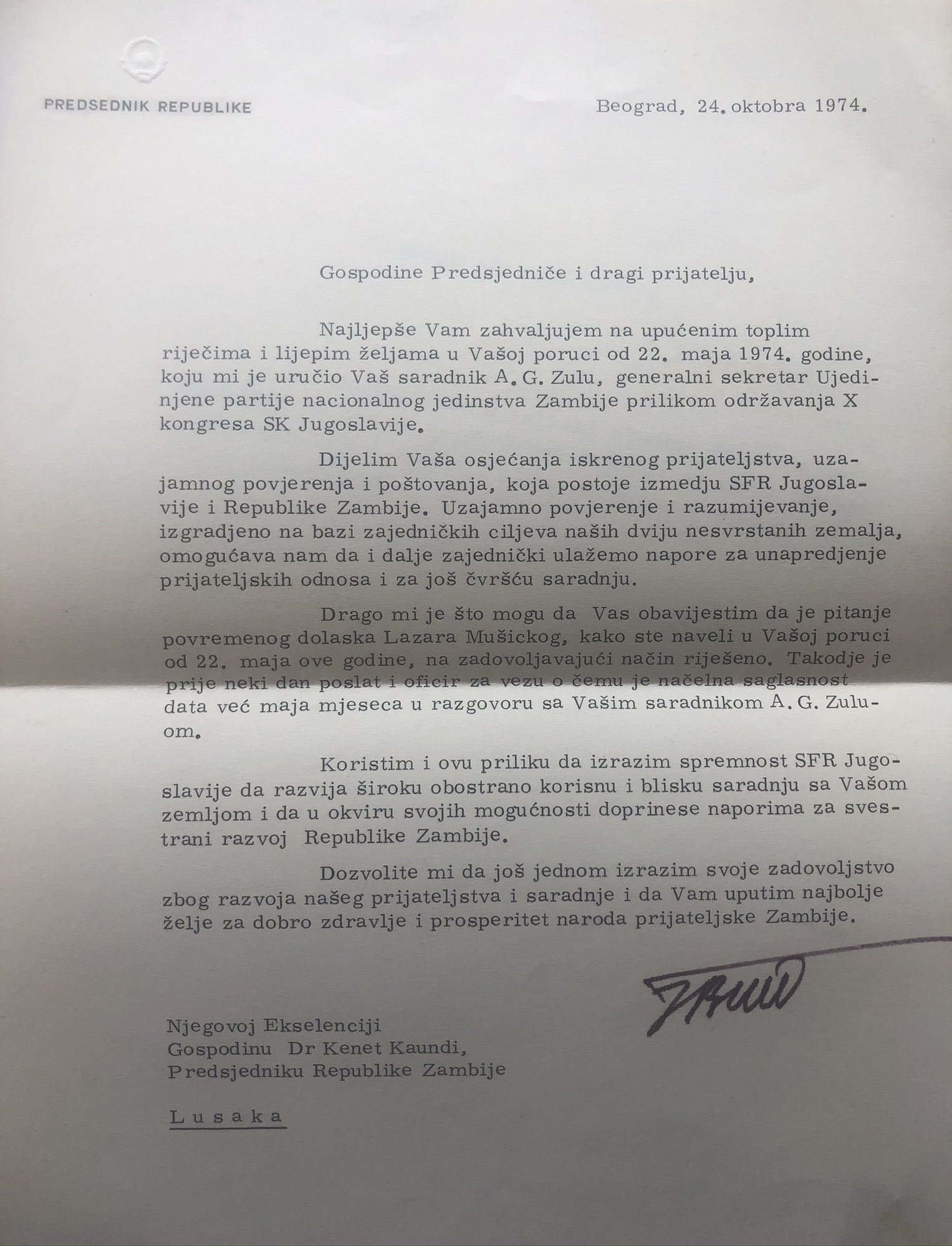
1974 Letter by Josip Broz Tito to the President of Zambia

Yugoslav organizations and the Government assisted Zambia's liberation movement morally, politically and financially before the independence. Yugoslav delegation headed by the Federal Executive Council's Vice-President Aleksandar Grličkov attended the formal proclamation of Zambia's independence on October 24, 1964.

=== 3rd conference of Heads of State or Government of the Non-Aligned Countries in Lusaka ===
After Lusaka was selected to host 3rd conference of Heads of State or Government of the Non-Aligned Countries the city was faced with major issue of lack of facilities to host the event. Only four months before the event President of Zambia Kenneth Kaunda (reluctant to invite companies from Western Bloc) invited Belgrade based construction company Energoprojekt holding asking them to build 4,000-seat convention hall as fast as possible and with price no obstacle. The project was designed and built simultaneously and 115 days after the works started and two weeks ahead of the deadline, the new convention hall was ready for the event. Yugoslav delegation at the conference was led by Croatian diplomat Budimir Lončar. He chaired the Yugoslav document drafting group and provided similar support to Zambian delegation at the preparatory meeting in Tanzania between 13 and 17 April 1970. The host country later even decided to appoint him as a chair to the group which drafted the final document of the conference and the group which provided documents and materials to Zambian delegation. 48 years after the conference, in an interview with Croatian historian Tvrtko Jakovina, commented that "Lusaka [Conference] was mine from A to Ž".

== Economic cooperation ==
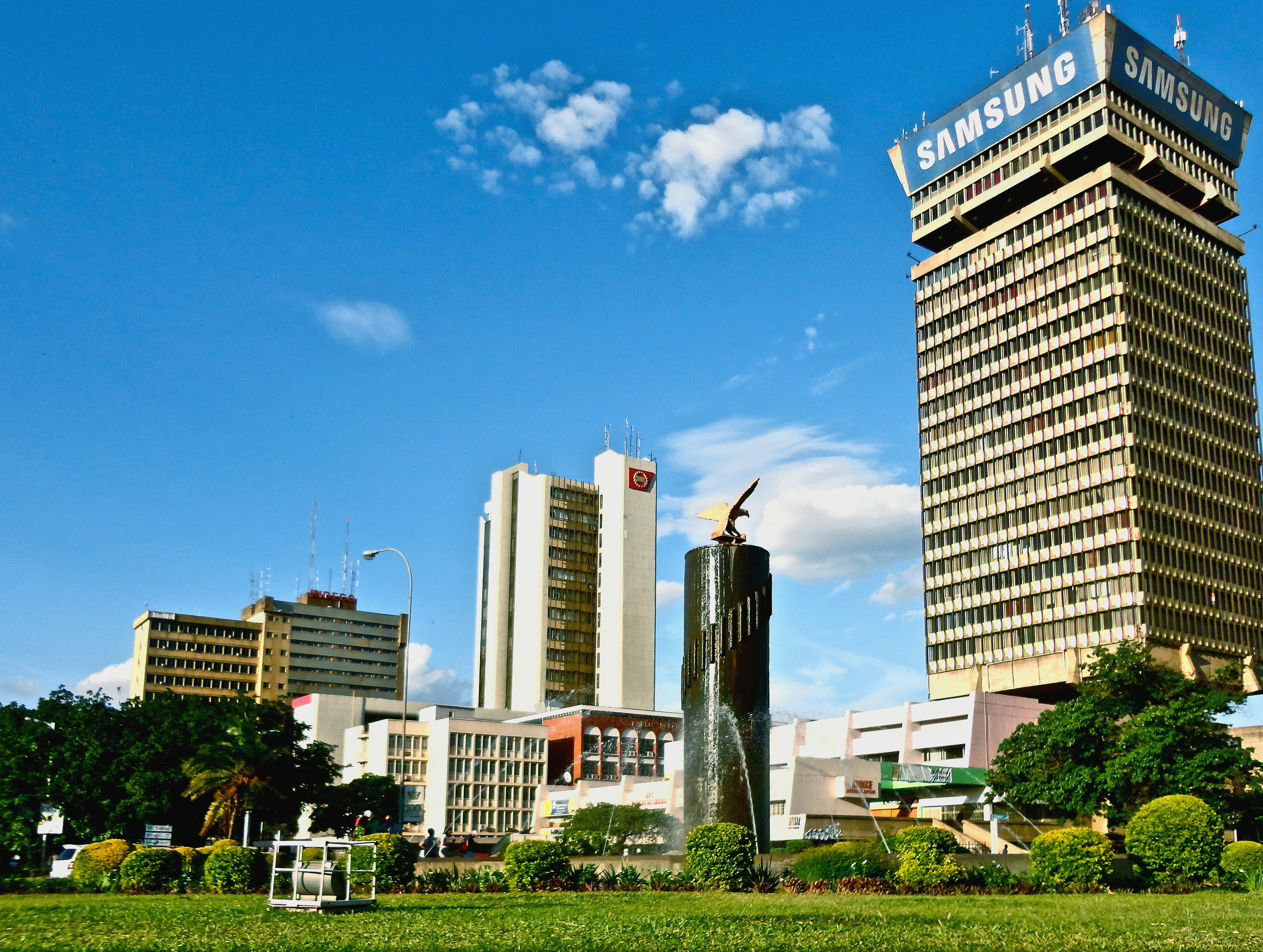
FINDECO House building furthest on the right is prominent example of Yugoslav Modernist architecture in Africa.

Zambia Engineering and Contracting Company Limited (ZECCO), Lusaka-based construction company which employs 170 people full time and has an annual turnover of US$3 million was established in 1965 as a joint venture between the Zambian and Yugoslavian governments. It was originally 65% owned by the Zambian state investment vehicle ZIMCO and 35% owned by Energoprojekt of Yugoslavia.

== List of bilateral state visits ==
=== Yugoslav visits to Zambia ===
- 2-9 February 1970: Josip Broz Tito
- 8-10 September 1970: Josip Broz Tito

=== Zambian visits to Yugoslavia ===
- 22-25 May 1964: Kenneth Kaunda
- September 1965: Kenneth Kaunda
- June 1967: Kenneth Kaunda
- October 1969: Kenneth Kaunda
- 6-12 May 1970: Kenneth Kaunda
- 1971: Kenneth Kaunda
- 27-29 September 1974: Kenneth Kaunda

== See also ==
- Yugoslavia and the Non-Aligned Movement
- Yugoslavia and the Organisation of African Unity
- Death and state funeral of Josip Broz Tito
