= Sudan–Yugoslavia relations =

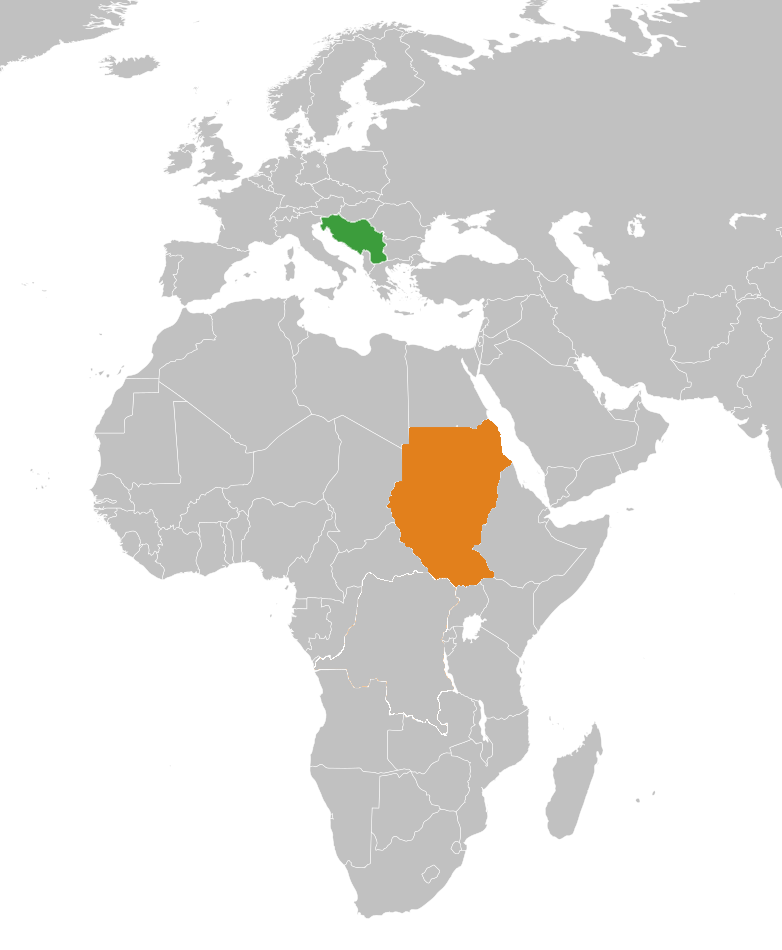

- Yugoslavia: Sudan

Sudan–Yugoslavia relations were historical foreign relations between Sudan and now split-up Socialist Federal Republic of Yugoslavia. Both countries were founding members of the Non-aligned Movement. President of Sudan Ibrahim Abboud personally participated in the 1961 Non-Aligned Conference in Belgrade. Relations between the two countries intensified after the failed 1971 Sudanese coup d'état when Sudan looked to replace its former ties with the Soviet Union with improved relations with Yugoslavia and the Socialist Republic of Romania.

The United States embassy in Khartoum believed that Sudan's relations with Yugoslavia were its closest relations with any socialist state and that Khartoum recognized post-1948 Yugoslav independence from the Soviet Union. The Yugoslav side was interested in further development of relations with Sudan as one of the Non-Aligned newly independent states in Africa. The country perceived its links with non-Bloc countries as an opportunity to strengthen its diplomatic position during the Cold War. Yugoslavia therefore provided especially important service in supplying parts and maintaining Sudan's aging Soviet built military equipment. The country also provided radio-transmitting facilities and secondhand naval patrol craft for the use in the Red Sea. An important aspect of the Yugoslav support was focused on the navy where it provided basic assistance in the establishment of the Sudanese Navy and for over a decade provided all of its vessels and the bulk of officer and technical training.

== List of bilateral state visits ==
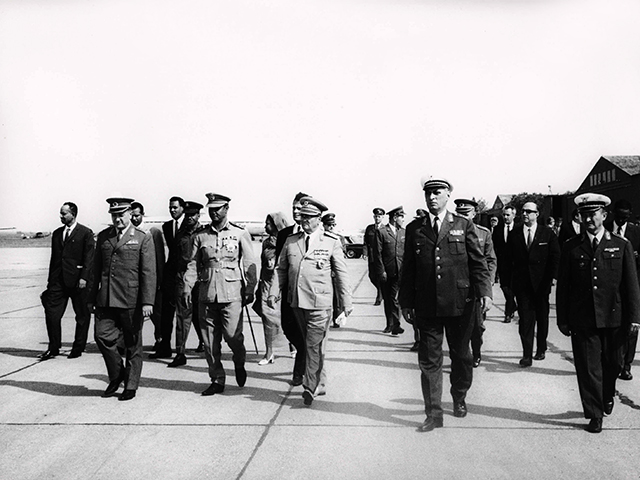
Jaafar Nimeiry at the Batajnica Air Base.

=== Yugoslav visits to Sudan ===
- 12-18 February 1959: Josip Broz Tito
- 14–18 February 1962: Josip Broz Tito
- 20–23 February 1970: Josip Broz Tito

=== Sudanese visits to Yugoslavia ===
- 9–20 July 1960: Ibrahim Abboud
- July 1961: Ibrahim Abboud
- April 1973: Jaafar Nimeiry

== See also ==
- Yugoslavia and the Non-Aligned Movement
- Yugoslavia and the Organisation of African Unity
- Death and state funeral of Josip Broz Tito
