= Algeria–Serbia relations =

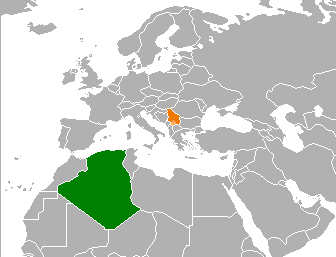
- Algeria: Serbia

Algeria and Serbia maintain diplomatic relations established between Algeria and SFR Yugoslavia in 1962, following Algeria's independence. From 1962 to 2006, Algeria maintained relations with the Socialist Federal Republic of Yugoslavia (SFRY) and the Federal Republic of Yugoslavia (FRY) (later Serbia and Montenegro), of which Serbia is considered shared (SFRY) or sole (FRY) legal successor.

== History ==
Between 1916 and 1919, a military cemetery containing the bodies of 324 Serbs was established in Dély Ibrahim. At the time in several coastal towns and villages in Algeria were several French military hospitals where the wounded and exhausted Serbian soldiers were being treated.

== Algeria's stance on Kosovo ==
Algeria does not recognize Kosovo, further improving Algeria-Serbia relations.

== Resident diplomatic missions ==
- Algeria has an embassy in Belgrade.
- Serbia has an embassy in Algiers.

== See also ==
- Foreign relations of Algeria
- Foreign relations of Serbia
- Algeria–Yugoslavia relations
- Yugoslavia and the Non-Aligned Movement
- Yugoslavia and the Organisation of African Unity
