= Nigeria–Yugoslavia relations =

Nigeria-Yugoslavia relations
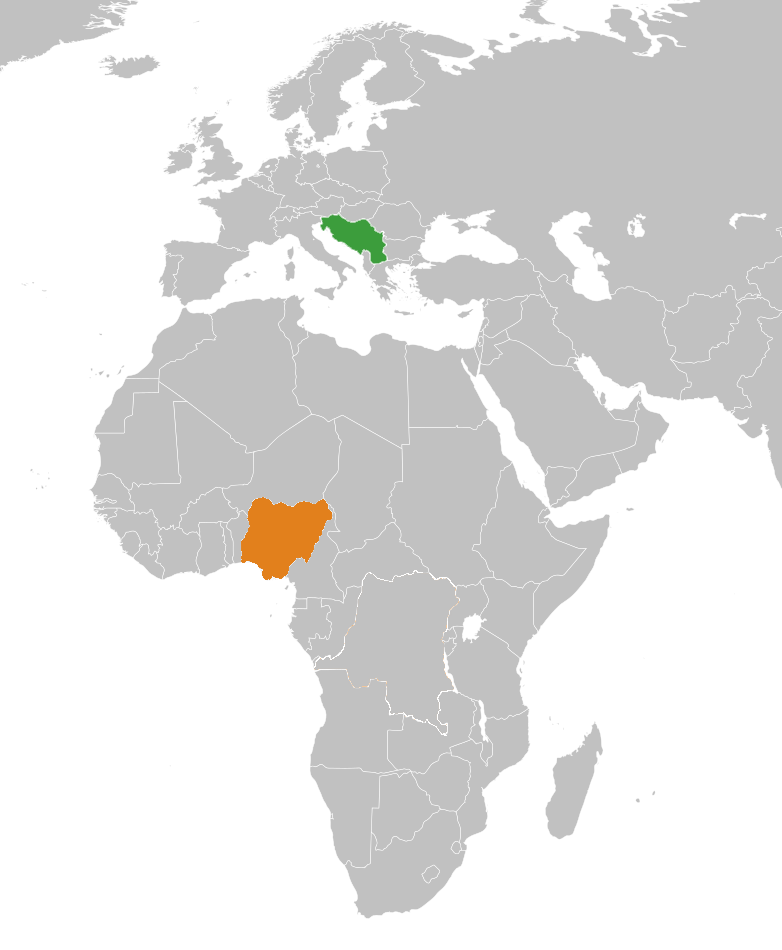

- Yugoslavia: Nigeria

Nigeria–Yugoslavia relations were historical foreign relations between Nigeria and the former Socialist Federal Republic of Yugoslavia. Formal diplomatic relations between the two countries were established in 1960 after the independence of Nigeria earlier that year. Both countries were members of the Non-Aligned Movement and they developed their relations in the framework of the Cold War Third World cooperation. Yugoslavia was one of the founding members of the movement while Belgrade believed that the reason why Nigeria did not participate in the 1st Summit of the Non-Aligned Movement as one of the founding members was the result of discouragement by the United States as the decision was announced during the prime minister's visit to Washington, D.C. During the existence of socialist Yugoslavia, both countries were organized as multi-ethnic federal states.

Two countries worked on the development of cultural, scientific and economic cooperation. Yugoslav construction companies were prominently engaged for the construction of the Lagos International Trade Fair as well as the old Parliament House building in Lagos.

The experience of the violent breakup of Yugoslavia and Yugoslav Wars increased levels of anxiety among multiple commentators in Nigeria over the communal conflicts in that country and pushed them to call not to let Nigeria to become another Yugoslavia. Following the breakup of Yugoslavia and Yugoslav Wars judge Adolphus Godwin Karibi-Whyte from Nigeria served at the International Criminal Tribunal for the former Yugoslavia.

== See also ==
- Yugoslavia and the Non-Aligned Movement
- Yugoslavia and the Organisation of African Unity
- Yugoslav Wars
- Nigerian Civil War
