= Yugoslavia–Zimbabwe relations =

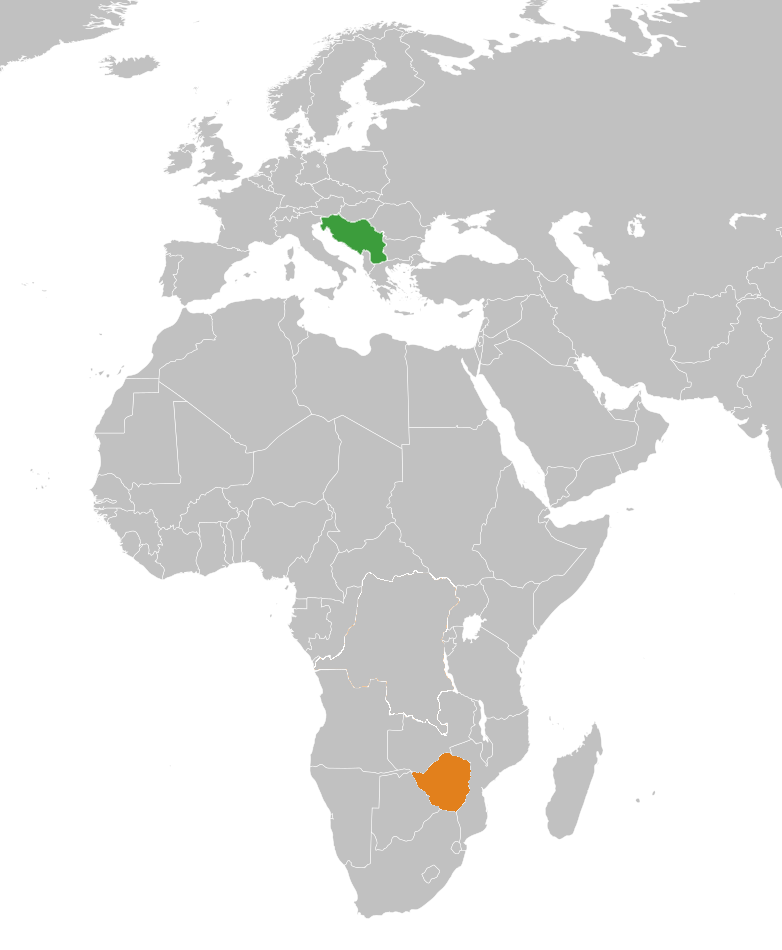

- Yugoslavia: Zimbabwe

Yugoslavia–Zimbabwe relations were historical foreign relations between now split-up Socialist Federal Republic of Yugoslavia and Zimbabwe. Relations between Yugoslavia and Zimbabwe independence movement started before the 1980 independence and were marked by participation of both sides in activities of the Non-Aligned Movement. The formal diplomatic relations between the two countries were established in 1980.

== History ==
Both the Zimbabwe African National Union led by Robert Mugabe and the Zimbabwe African People's Union led by Joshua Nkomo participated as observers in the 1978 Non-Aligned Movement Ministerial Conference in Belgrade. Mugabe's movement was perceived as more China aligned and supported while Nkomo's movement was perceived as a pro-Soviet movement. Cold War Yugoslavia, marked by experience of the 1948 Tito–Stalin split, showed more sympathies towards Mugabe's movement to which it provided certain military assistance in its fight against Rhodesia’s white minority government. Yugoslavia showed its preferences on protocol level by assigning Mugabe's movement delegation number 110. while Nkomo's movement ended as 111. delegation. Yugoslav diplomacy pushed for quick conclusion of the Lancaster House Agreement which directly led to the creation and recognition of the Republic of Zimbabwe. British Conservative politician and minister in the Foreign and Commonwealth Office Peter Blaker visited Belgrade in November 1979 where in conversation with Josip Vrhovec he stated belief that agreement will be reached soon, while Yugoslavia expressed concerns over foreign intrusion in Zambia.

=== Relations from 1980 until the Breakup of Yugoslavia ===
One of the first large international outings for Robert Mugabe after the independence happened at during the state funeral of Josip Broz Tito in May 1980. Mugabe, who was inspired by Yugoslav model, stated that Yugoslav support to Zimbabwe's revolution is large and will never be forgotten, and that World War II Yugoslav Partisans resistance against Fascism was inspiration in Zimbabwe. Cvijetin Mijatović visited Zimbabwe in spring of 1981 during his African tour while Mugabe returned this visit in November of the same year. During the final years of the Yugoslav federation Zimbabwe showed significant support to the rump state of the Federal Republic of Yugoslavia (Serbia and Montenegro) and abstained from recognition of the former Yugoslav republics for a couple of years after they joined United Nations. During the Yugoslav crisis Zimbabwe was a non-permanent member of the United Nations Security Council and was one of only three states which abstained during the voting for the United Nations Security Council Resolution 777.

== See also ==
- Yugoslavia and the Non-Aligned Movement
- Yugoslavia and the Organisation of African Unity
- Serbia–Zimbabwe relations
- Death and state funeral of Josip Broz Tito
