= Democratic Republic of the Congo–Yugoslavia relations =

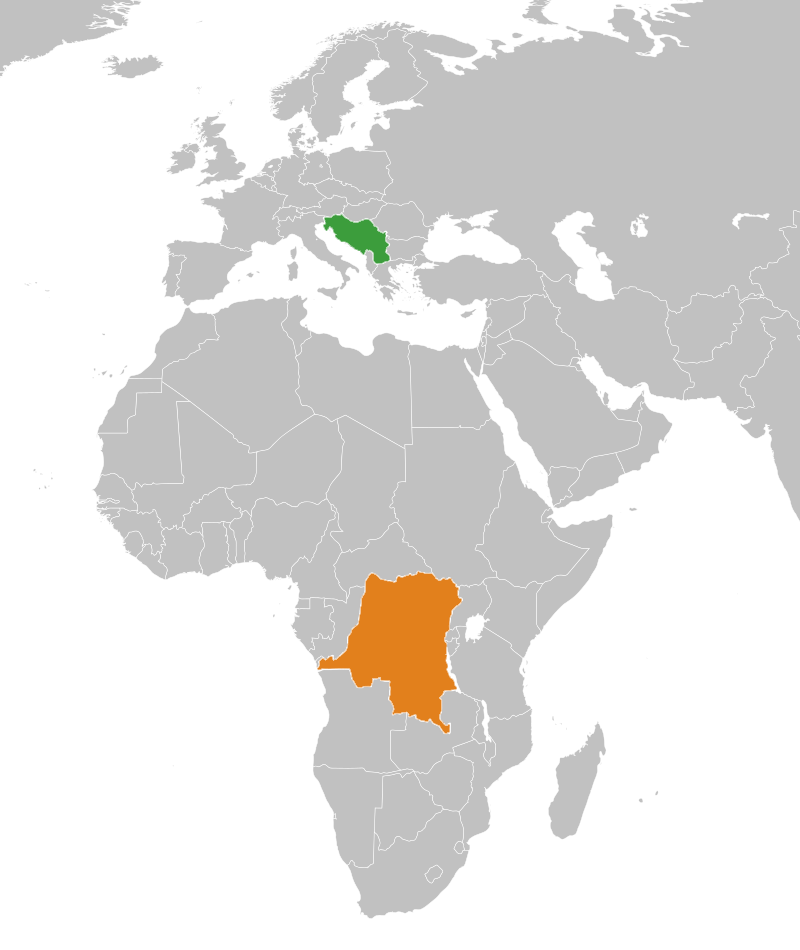

- Yugoslavia: Zaire

Diplomatic mission
- Embassy of Yugoslavia, Kinshasa: Embassy of Zaire, Belgrade

Democratic Republic of the Congo–Yugoslavia relations were historical foreign relations between Congo-Léopoldville or Zaire (modern day Democratic Republic of the Congo) and now split-up Socialist Federal Republic of Yugoslavia. Formal diplomatic relations between the two countries were established in 1961, and the two maintained embassies in each other's capitals.

== History ==
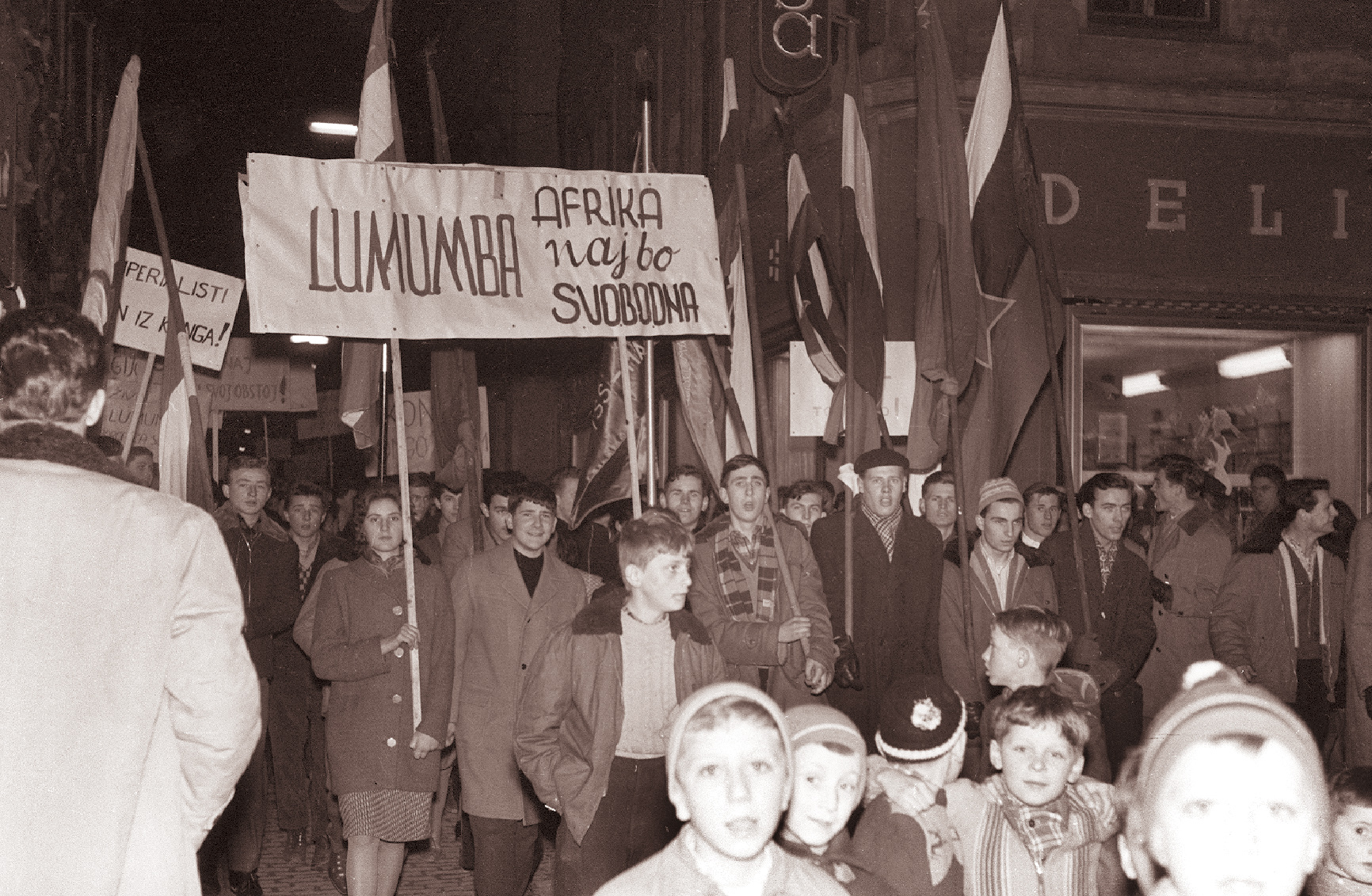
Protests in Slovenia, Yugoslavia, against the death of Lumumba, 1961.

In 1885 Belgian King Leopold II appointed the Serb Kosta Dinić to serve as both a doctor and judge in the Congo Free State. He later wrote his Letters from the Congo.

Both Yugoslavia and DC Congo were active members of the Non-Aligned Movement during the Cold War. The Congo Crisis was one of the central issues at the time of the establishment of the movement and its first Belgrade conference. During the 15th session of the United Nations General Assembly non-aligned countries from Africa and Asia together with Yugoslavia repeatedly initiated discussion on the situation in Congo. Following the execution of Patrice Lumumba, Congo's first democratically elected prime minister, demonstrations started in Yugoslav capital Belgrade which escalated in ransacking of the Belgian Embassy. At the second 1964 Non-Aligned Conference in Cairo Yugoslav delegation opposed active participation (and entrance to the conference room) of the Prime Minister of the Democratic Republic of the Congo Moïse Tshombe due to his role in Lumumba's execution. As Lumumba was perceived as a symbol of Decolonisation of Africa Tshombe was despised by most of African delegations as well. Yugoslav delegation's view was supported by the President of Algeria Ahmed Ben Bella, President of Egypt and host Gamal Abdel Nasser and Prime Minister of Sri Lanka Sirimavo Bandaranaike.

To accommodate rising numbers of students at the University of Belgrade authorities opened the Student Dormitory Patris Lumumba in 1961, the name kept up until today (as of 2021).

At the 1974 FIFA World Cup Yugoslavia national football team achieved one of its best score by beating the DR Congo national football team with the result 9:0. On 21 May 1980 Democratic Republic of the Congo and Yugoslavia, together with Tanzania and Zambia proposed a draft resolution to the World Health Assembly to extend the assistance in the health sector to the newly independent Republic of Zimbabwe which was affected by the consequences of the Zimbabwe War of Liberation. At the time of the breakup of Yugoslavia Zaire, together with Zimbabwe, tried to lobby of behalf of the rump Federal Republic of Yugoslavia yet their efforts led to limited or no success in the situation of international unipolarity and condemnation of Federal Republic of Yugoslavia involvement in Bosnian War and Croatia.

== See also ==
- Yugoslavia and the Non-Aligned Movement
- Yugoslavia and the Organisation of African Unity
- White Legion (Zaire) (1996–97)
- United Nations Operation in the Congo
- MONUSCO
- United Nations Protection Force (former Yugoslavia)
- UNCRO, UNTAES and UNMOP
- United Nations Interim Administration Mission in Kosovo
- European Union Military Operation in the Democratic Republic of the Congo (2006)
- European Union Military Operation in the Former Yugoslav Republic of Macedonia
- Operation Althea and European Union Police Mission in Bosnia and Herzegovina
- European Union Rule of Law Mission in Kosovo
- Death and state funeral of Josip Broz Tito
