= Angola–Yugoslavia relations =

Angola-Yugoslavia relations
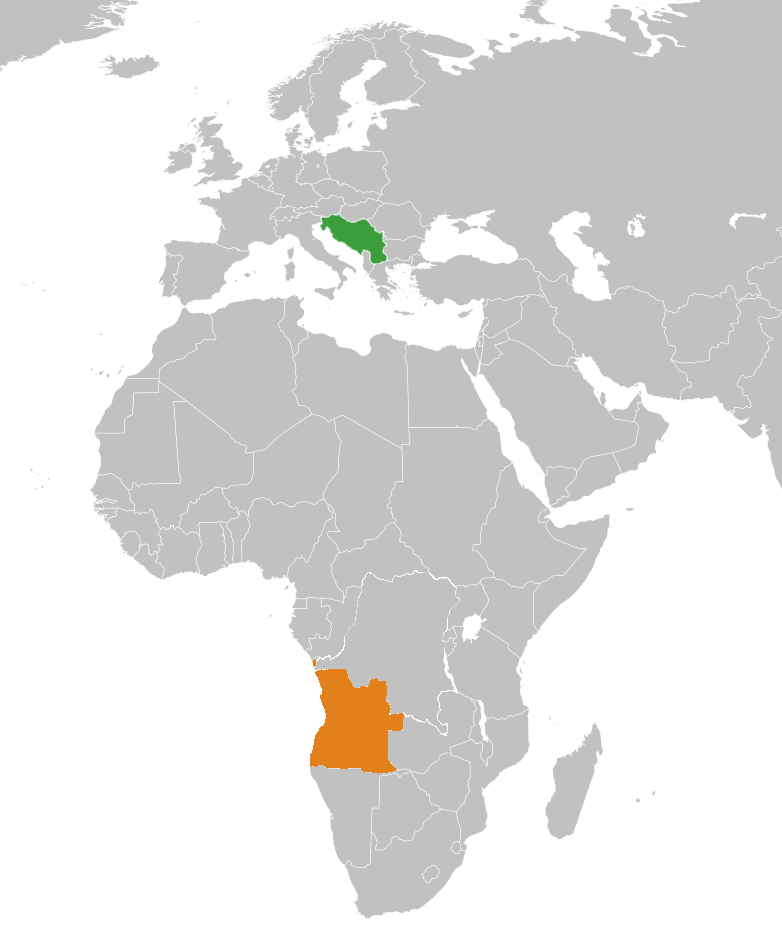

- Yugoslavia: Angola

Angola–Yugoslavia relations were historical foreign relations between Angola and now split-up Socialist Federal Republic of Yugoslavia. During the Cold War both countries actively participated in the work of the Non-Aligned Movement.

== History ==
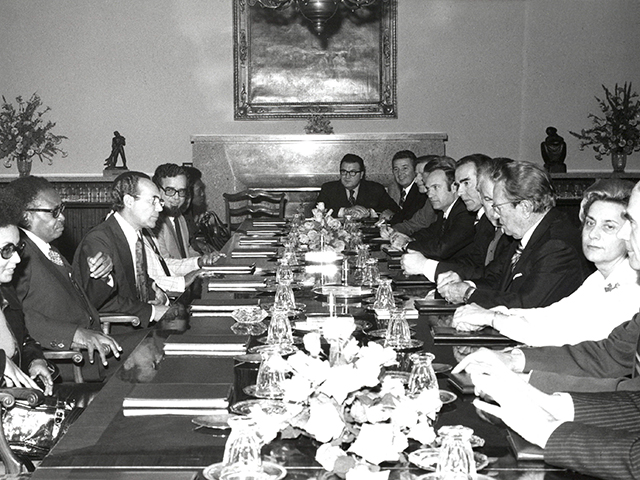
Meeting between Yugoslav and Angolan leaders on the Brijuni islands, 1977

Yugoslavia officially recognized the independence of Angola just one day after it was declared in 1975. The formal diplomatic relations were established that same year. Informal relations started earlier with the opening of the MPLA’s Information Bureau in Belgrade that served as an informal Angolan embassy and with Yugoslavia providing scholarships for MPLA cadres.

At the time of the Portuguese Colonial War Yugoslavia provided military and other forms of aid to liberation movements across Africa. Yugoslav support to decolonization movements in Africa affected Yugoslav relations with superpowers but was also motivated by its rivalry with Cuba over the leadership in the Non-aligned movement. In 1976 President of Yugoslavia Josip Broz Tito explicitly endorsed Cuban intervention in Angola despite the opposition from the United States. President of Angola Agostinho Neto visited Yugoslavia on three occasion in 1968, 1971 1973 and 1977 while Prime Minister of Angola Lopo do Nascimento visited Yugoslavia in 1976. Yugoslavia provided financial and material support for the MPLA, including $14 million in 1977, as well as Yugoslav security personnel in the country and diplomatic training for Angolans in Belgrade. The United States Ambassador to Yugoslavia wrote of the Yugoslav relationship with the MPLA, and remarked, "Tito clearly enjoys his role as patriarch of guerrilla liberation struggle." Agostinho Neto, MPLA's leader during the civil war, declared in 1977 that Yugoslav aid was constant and firm, and described the help as extraordinary.

== See also ==
- Yugoslavia and the Non-Aligned Movement
- Yugoslavia and the Organisation of African Unity
- Death and state funeral of Josip Broz Tito
- Angola–Serbia relations
