= Algeria–Yugoslavia relations =

Algeria-Yugoslavia relations
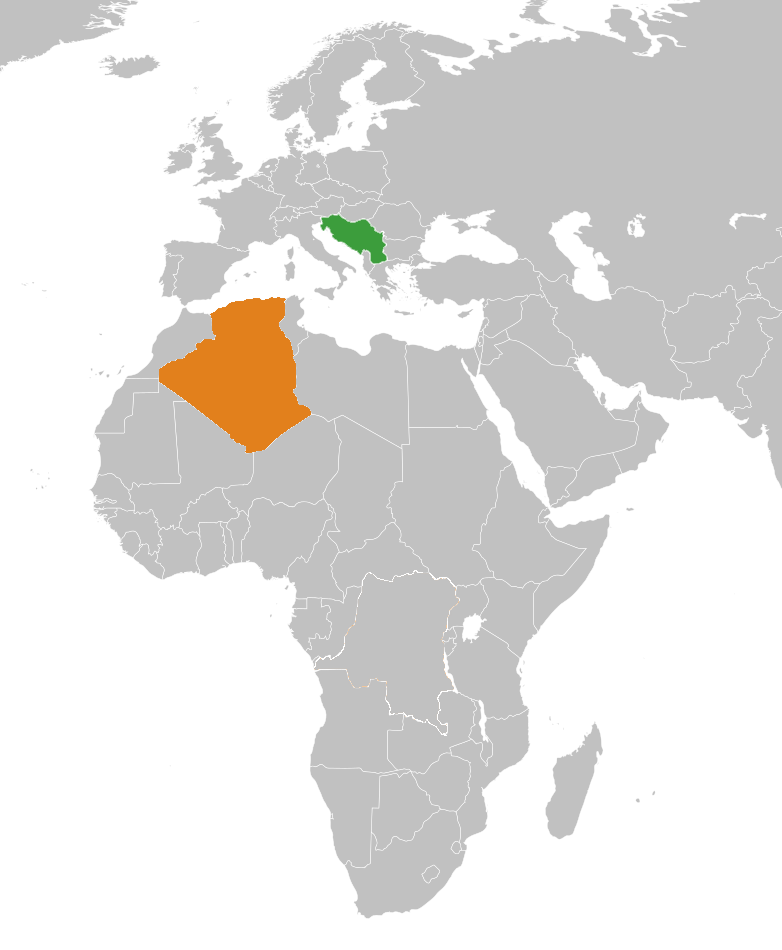

- Yugoslavia: Algeria

Algeria–Yugoslavia relations were historical foreign relations between Algeria and now split-up Socialist Federal Republic of Yugoslavia. Both countries self-identified with the wider Mediterranean region and shared membership in the Non-Aligned Movement. During the Algerian War Yugoslavia provided significant logistical and diplomatic support to the Algerian side which affected its intra-European relations with France. Yugoslavia was the first European country to openly support the FLN.

Within the Non-Aligned Movement Yugoslavia closely collaborated with self-described core members of India and Egypt while Algeria followed self-described progressive group in which Cuba played prominent role. Yugoslavia officially recognized the independence of Algeria on 5 September 1961 as the first country in Europe to do so. The country established formal diplomatic relations 3 days before the independence on 2 July 1962. This led to rupture in Yugoslav-French relations as Paris decided to withdraw its ambassador from Belgrade.

== History ==
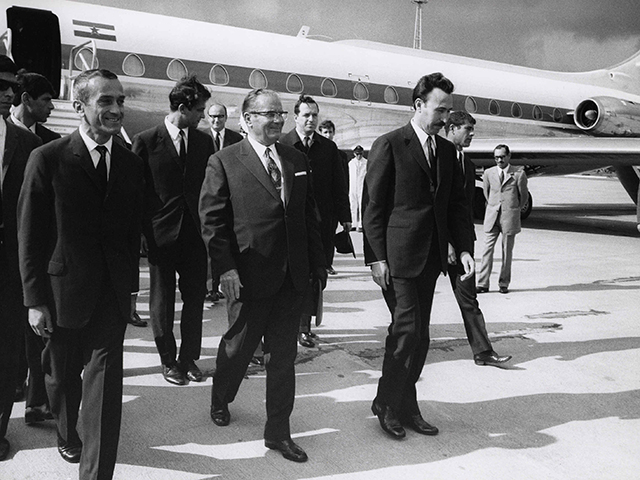
President of Yugoslavia Josip Broz Tito in Algeria (1969)

During the Algerian War representatives of the National Liberation Front described their Mediterranean ally Yugoslavia as their closest non-Arab allies. During the war Yugoslavia de facto recognition of the FLN as the representative of the Algerian nation, but considering France's stern warnings avoided de jure recognition of the movement. It is believed that the first secret contacts were established in 1954 in Cairo when Yugoslavia officially sold military equipment to Egypt which after one month were transferred to Algeria. In October 1956 Belgrade hosted the meeting between FLN's Mohamed Khider and SFIO's Pierre Herbaut, while from 1957 Yugoslavia abandoned intermediation efforts and decided to openly support Algeria. From that time French Navy started to interspect Yugoslav trade ships in Mediterranean believing that they deliver aid to Algerian rebels. On 7 August 1957 French Navy discovered and took 70 tones of military equipment of Yugoslav ship Srbija [English: Serbia] while the largest discovered delivery was discovered on 18 January 1958 close to Oran when Jadrolinija's ship Slovenija [English: Slovenia] was found in possession of 148 tons of military equipment. President of the Provisional Government of the Algerian Republic Ferhat Abbas visited Belgrade between 6 and 12 January 1959 where he talked with the President of Yugoslavia Josip Broz Tito. On 2 February 1959 other two members Krim Belkacem and Mhamed Yazid held talks with the Ambassador of Yugoslavia to Tunisia. Yugoslavia provided food, medicine, and military supplies to the Algerian fighters which Algerians did not expect from a middle-sized European communist country. Yugoslav population perceived Algerian experiences as reminiscent of its not so distant National Liberation and Revolution during the World War II. Country therefore paid attention to the cultural aspect of the Algerian War and sent its photographers such as Stevan Labudović who recorded 27 films and 274 photos in 1959-1962 period, official El Moudjahid newspapers were issued in Belgrade edition as well the first gramophone recording of the Kassaman. On 1 March 1960 National Liberation Front (FLN) opened its Bureau in Belgrade. Against the Indian wishes but with support of Sukarno and Nkrumah, the Algerian FLN was invited to attend the 1961 Non-Aligned Conference in Belgrade under the status of a sovereign government. Ben Bella visited Yugoslavia in March 1964.

== List of bilateral state visits ==
=== Yugoslav visits to Algeria ===
- 24-30 April 1965: Josip Broz Tito
- 5-9 November 1969: Josip Broz Tito
- 2-10 September 1973: Josip Broz Tito
- 28-31 May 1979: Josip Broz Tito
- 20-21 October 1979: Josip Broz Tito

=== Algerian visits to Yugoslavia ===
- 9 June 1959: Ferhat Abbas
- 2 September 1961: Benyoucef Benkhedda
- 5-13 March 1964: Ahmed Ben Bella
- 6-11 October 1966: Houari Boumédiène
- 12-14 June 1967: Houari Boumédiène
- 15 October 1973: Houari Boumédiène
- 14-15 January 1978: Houari Boumédiène
- 22 July-1 August 1978: Houari Boumédiène

== See also ==
- Yugoslavia and the Non-Aligned Movement
- Yugoslavia and the Organisation of African Unity
- National Liberation Army and Partisan Detachments of Yugoslavia
- National Liberation Front of Algeria
- Yugoslav Wars
- Algerian Civil War
- Algeria–Serbia relations
- Mediterranean Games
- Death and state funeral of Josip Broz Tito
