= Museum of African Art, Belgrade =

Art museum in Senjak, Belgrade, Serbia

Museum of African Art
- Muzej Afričke Umetnosti - Zbirka Vede i dr Zdravka Pečara
- Official logo

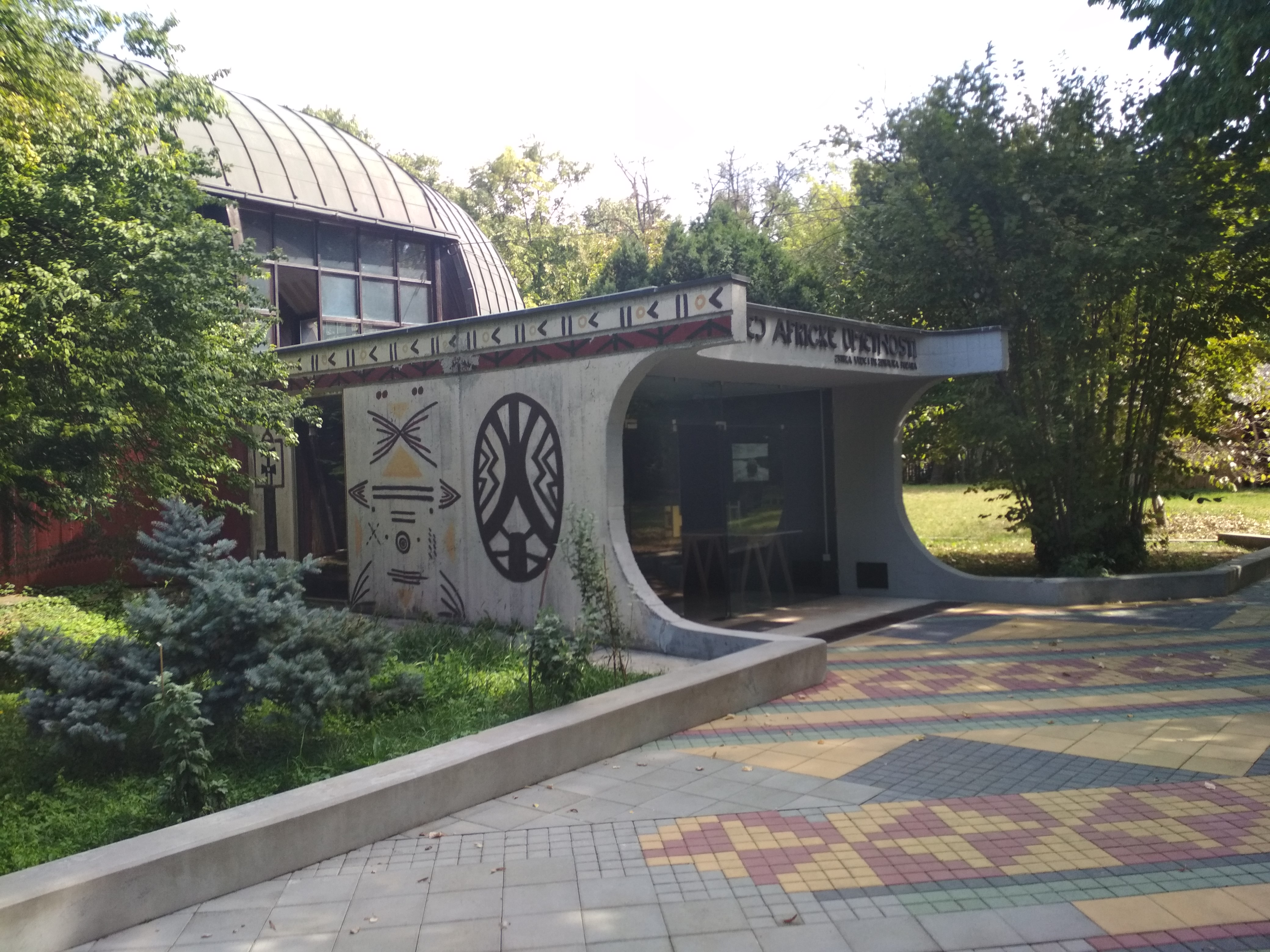
- Established: 1977; 49 years ago
- Location: Senjak, Belgrade, Serbia
- Coordinates: 44.789054°N 20.434974°E
- Type: Art museum
- Collection size: 1,700
- Founders: Zdravko Pečar and Veda Pečar
- Director: Marija Aleksić
- Public transit access: Bus route 44 and 34 (Vasa Pelagić Station)
- Website: www.mau.rs

The Museum of African Art is the oldest institution in Southeast Europe dedicated exclusively to African Art. Located in the Senjak neighborhood of Belgrade, Serbia, the museum was founded in 1977 and is the only museum in Serbia dedicated to the arts and culture of Africa. The museum presents itself as an anti-colonial institution, meaning it opposes the control of one land by another and the exploitation of resources. This distinguishes it from other European collections of African Art. Its artifacts were not acquired through colonization, plunder, or exploitation but were instead received as gifts from African nations.

== History ==
The museum was established by Veda Zagorac and Zdravko Pečar, a former Yugoslav ambassador to Ghana and Mali, who donated the collection they had assembled during their time in Africa. The collection was bequeathed to the City of Belgrade in 1974, and the museum officially opened in 1977. It was established during a period of strong Yugoslav engagement with the Non-Aligned Movement, which promoted neutrality and cooperation among countries during the Cold War. It reflects cultural connections between Yugoslavia and African nations. Today, the museum continues to promote the study and appreciation of African Art and culture in Southeast Europe.

The collection initially originated from the private collection of Croatian diplomats from neighboring countries who shared the same linguistic and historical ties. These diplomats served in the Socialist Federal Republic of Yugoslavia which existed from 1945 to 1992, contributing to the country's economic, political and international relations. Since its establishment, the museum has continually expanded its collection and, as of 2006, contains approximately 1,700 pieces.

== Collection ==
The permanent exhibition highlights artifacts from West Africa, particularly from Ghana, Mali, Côte d'Ivoire, and Burkina Faso. Cultures represented include Bambara, Baule, Dogon, Yoruba, Kissi, Lobi, Gere, Guro, Baga, and many others. Through its exhibitions, the museum presents African Art while also highlighting the cultures behind the pieces and acknowledging the communities that made them.

The collection includes a significant number of African masks including those from Gere, Guro, and Baga and among others. These masks were traditionally used for rituals, dances and spiritual ceremonies. They are typically made of wood that represent faces, animals, spirits or ancestors.

Beyond masks, the museum includes cultural objects, musical instruments, and textiles used in African rituals, traditions, and everyday life. The collection contains many important and historically significant pieces from the regions that Zdravko Pečar visited during his diplomatic service.

== Anti-Colonial Approach ==
The institution identifies as an anti-colonial institution, meaning it opposes the control of one land by another and exploitation of resources. This allows it to distinguish itself from many other European collections of African Art. Its artifacts were not acquired through colonization, plunder, or exploitation but were instead received as gifts from African nations, reflecting Yugoslavia’s diplomatic relationships and cultural cooperation with its African allies. This approach sets the collection apart from many other European holdings of African Art.

== Significance ==
The museum of African Art is important because it promotes the study of African cultures while providing diversity and preserving objects of historical and spiritual significance. This contributes to education, research, and intercultural understanding.

== Gallery ==
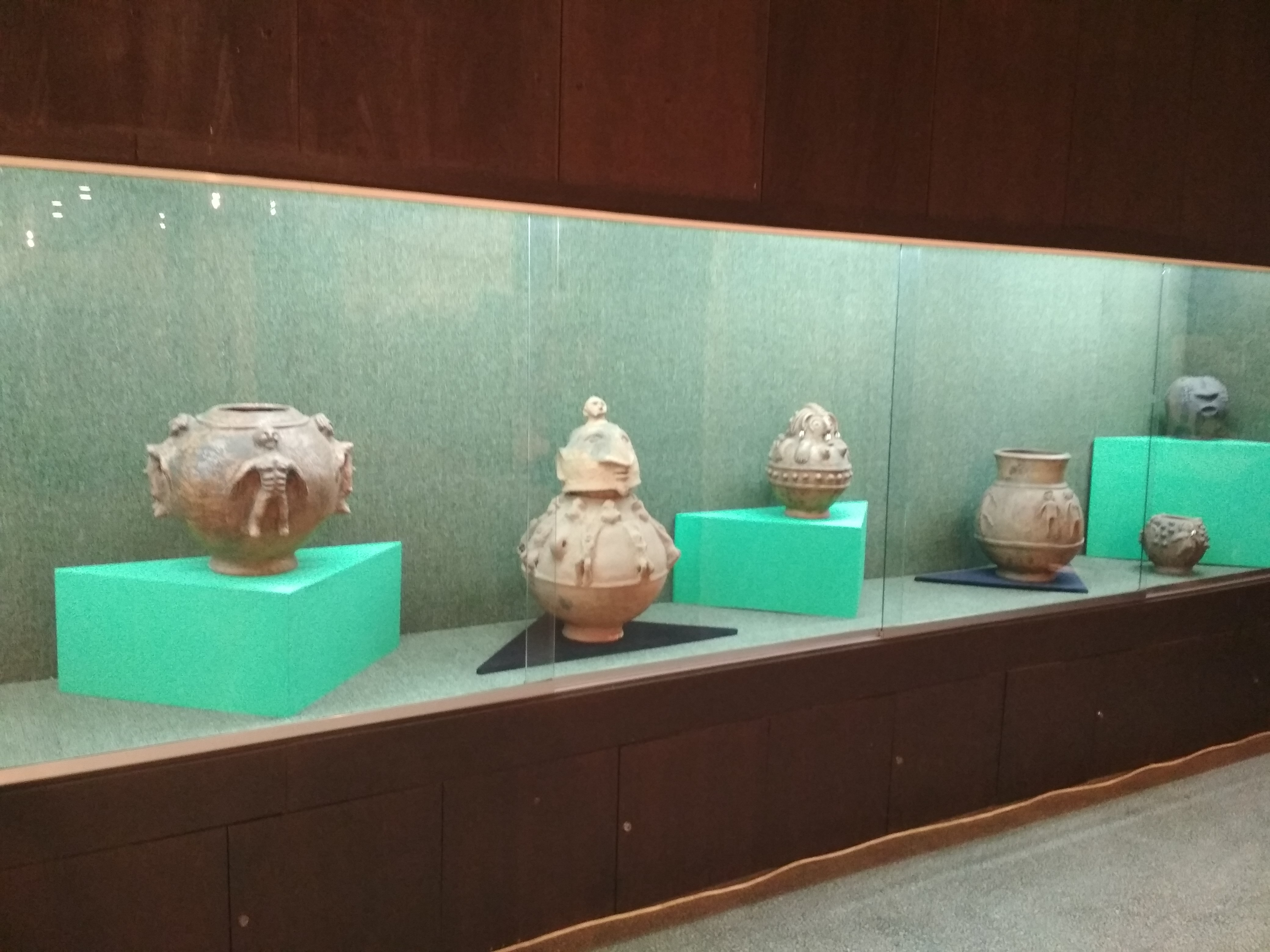
Interior

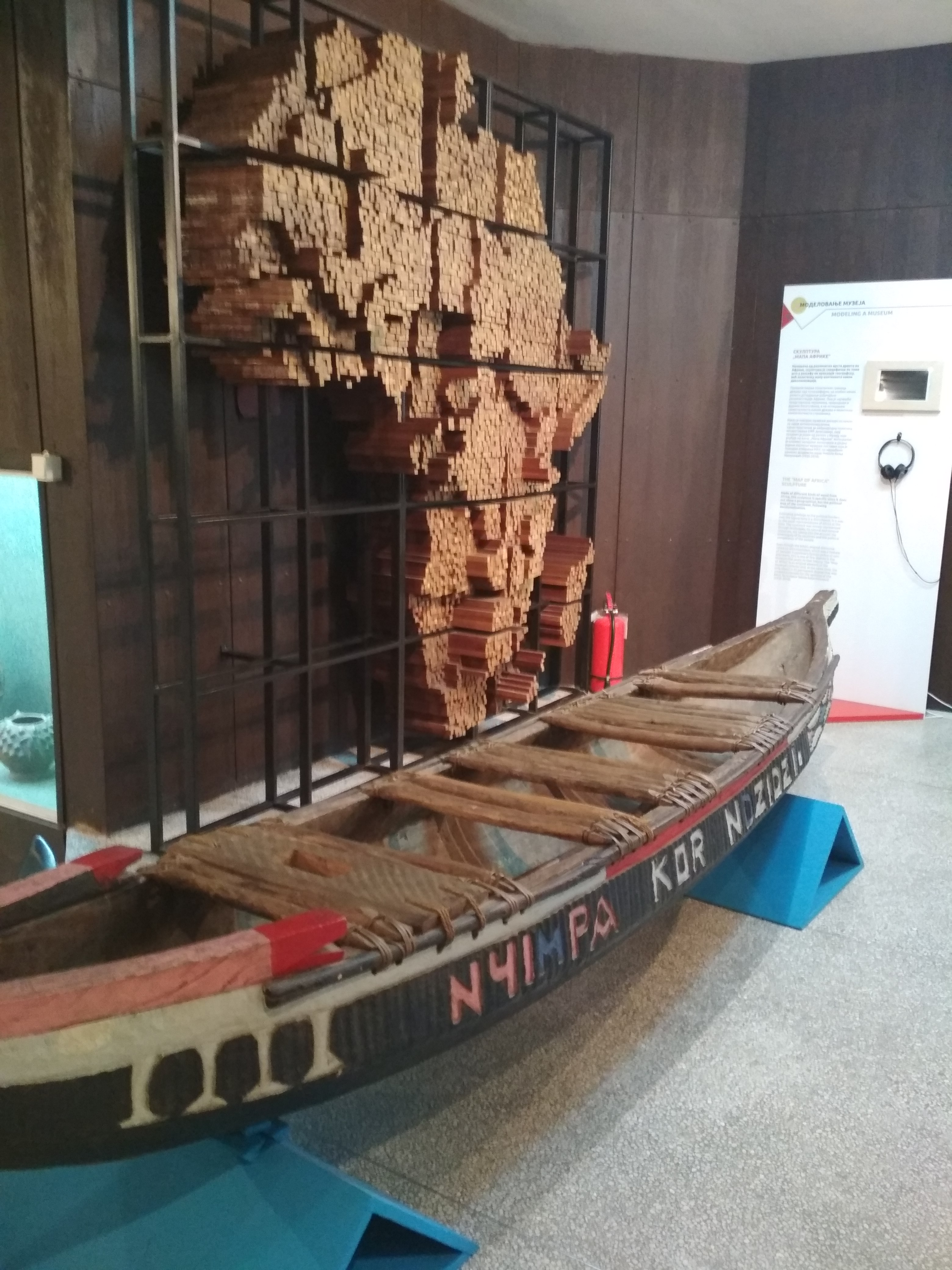
Interior

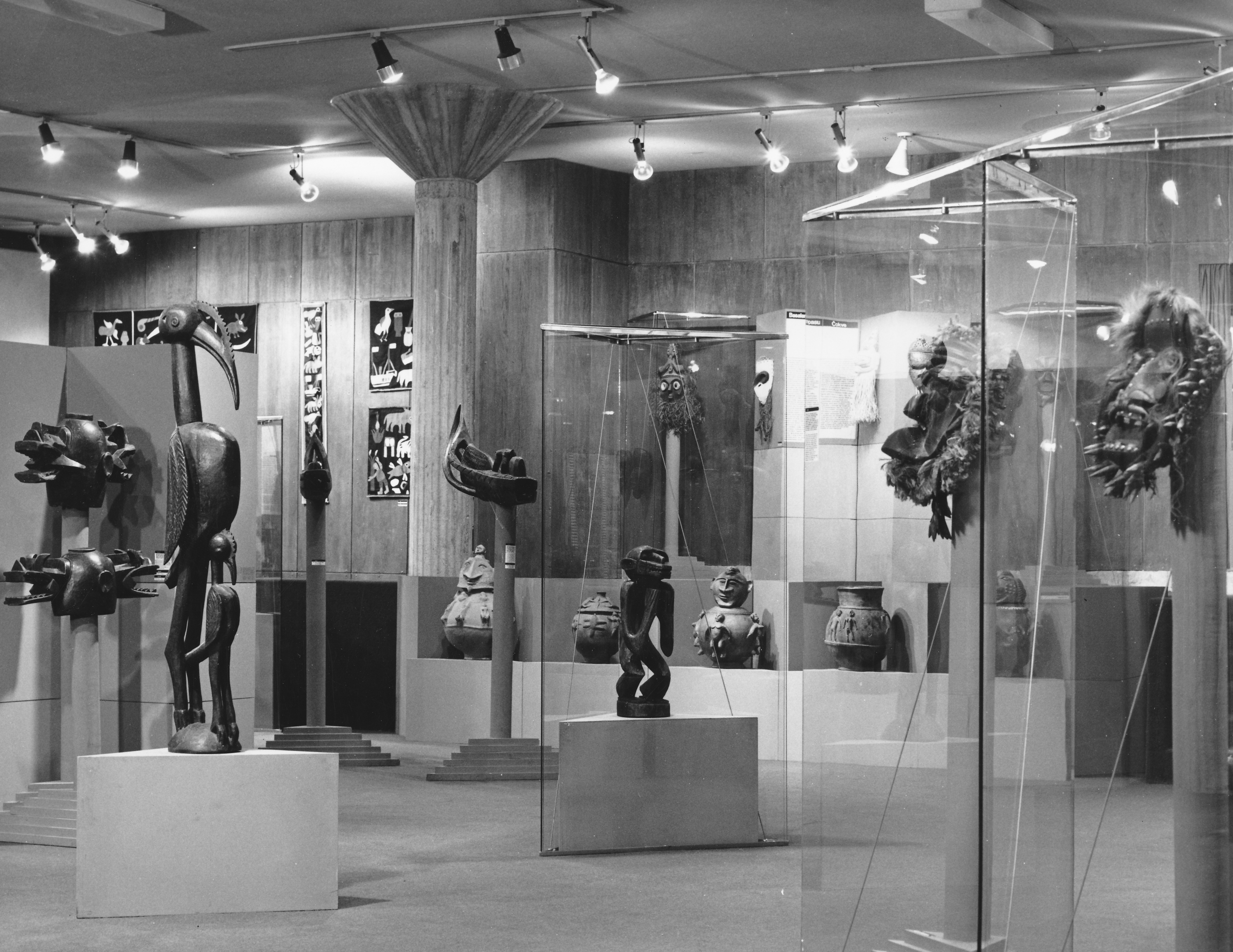
Permanent exhibition (1977)

== See also ==
- Yugoslavia and the Organisation of African Unity
- Gallery of the Non-Aligned Countries "Josip Broz Tito"
- List of museums in Serbia
