= Yugoslavia and the Organisation of African Unity =

- Organisation of African Unity: Yugoslavia

During the Cold War period former Southeast European country of the Socialist Federal Republic of Yugoslavia established and maintained significant political, cultural and economic exchanges and relations with newly independent African states. While majority of multilateral exchanges were organized via Non-Aligned Movement and the United Nations, significant cooperation developed with the Organisation of African Unity as well, predecessor to contemporary African Union. Yugoslavia was the only non-African country which participated in funding of the Liberation Committee of the Organisation of African Unity. While being a uniquely involved in the workings of the body the country nevertheless preferred bilateral relations with individual liberation movements. The Organisation of African Unity included the Non-Alignment principle in its charter while Yugoslavia consider the organisation to be the only legitimate representative for the entire African continent throughout the Cold War era. Yugoslavia therefore followed common OAU line in its own policies towards issues in Africa.

== Context ==
Yugoslavia, contrary to many Western Bloc countries in Europe did not have any direct colonial past which complicated relations between former Metropoles and newly independent states. The country believed that its own historical experiences of foreign domination by Austro-Hungarian and Ottoman empire, challenges in development and complex multi-ethnic federalist structure are akin to experiences of newly independent post-colonial countries in Africa. At the same time, from the 1948 Tito–Stalin split onwards the country was not anymore under the sphere of influence of the Soviet Union and was instead focused on non-Bloc countries. As the maneuvering space for neutral countries in deeply divided Europe was shrinking Yugoslavia turned its foreign policy focus on new allies among former colonies and mandate territories, primarily in Africa and the Middle East.

Yugoslav construction firm Energoprojekt constructed and designed the Kampala International Conference Center in 1975 to accommodate the 13th Summit of the Organization of African Unity. Yugoslav architect Mario Jobst was invited to work on the conference center for the 14th OAU Summit in Libreville as well. Some exchanges remained at the level of planning with Yugoslav architect Branko Petrović creating the general plan for the headquarters building of the Organisation of African Unity in Addis Ababa in early 1960's which was never implemented in practice.

== Gallery ==
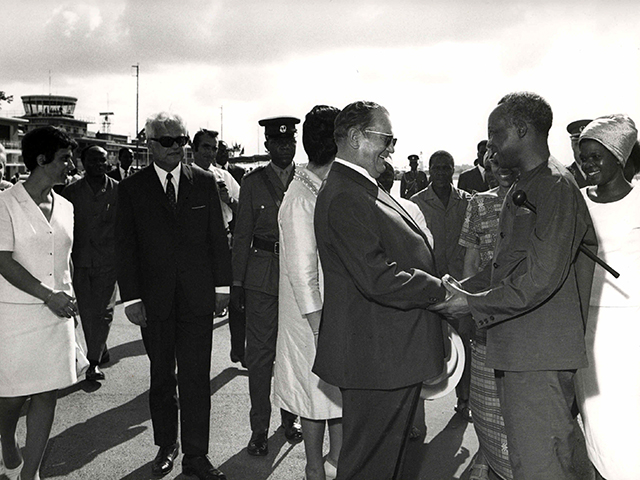
President Josip Broz Tito at the end of his 1970 visit to Tanzania.

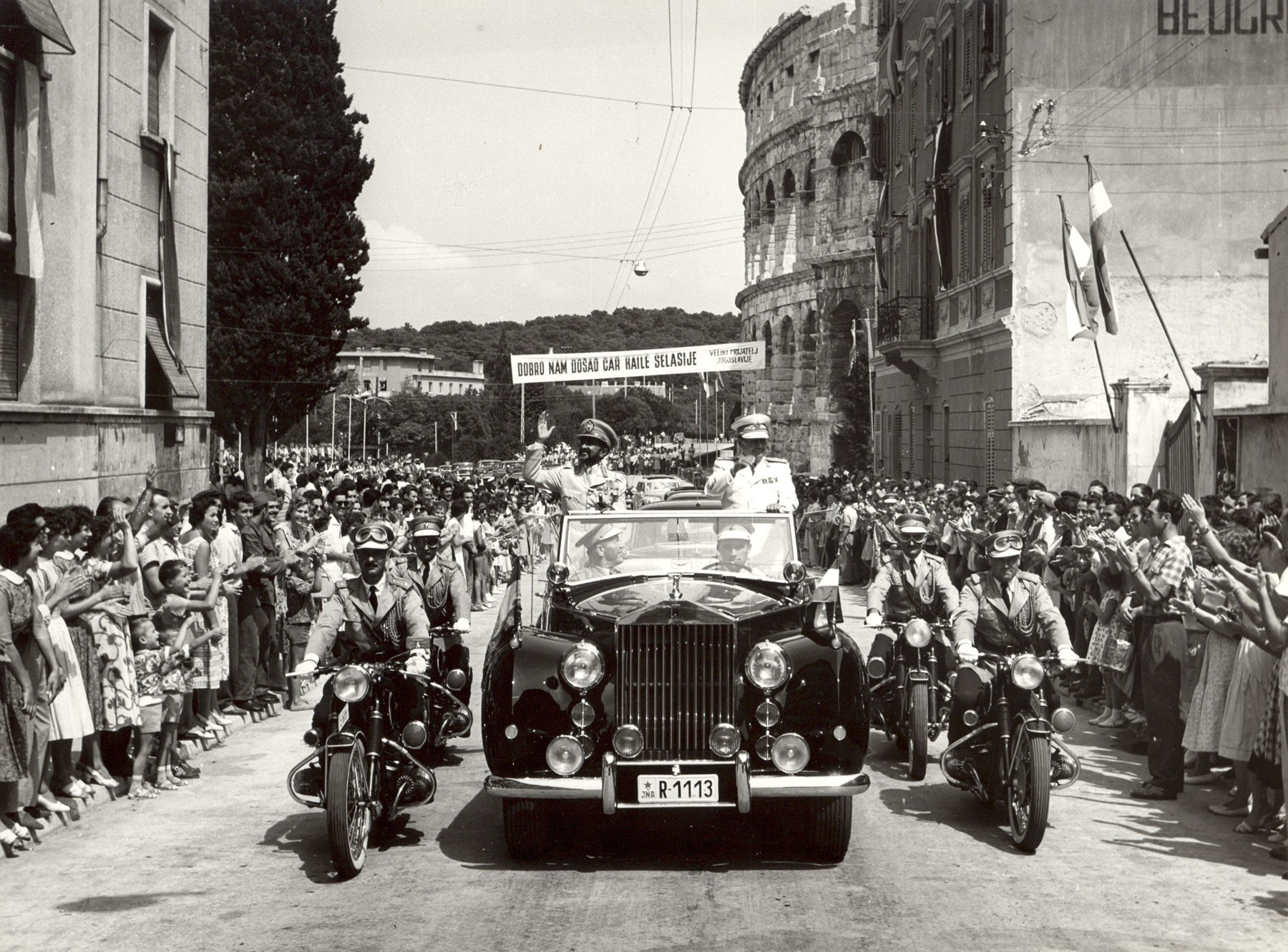
President Tito and Emperor Haile Selassie in Pula, SR Croatia.

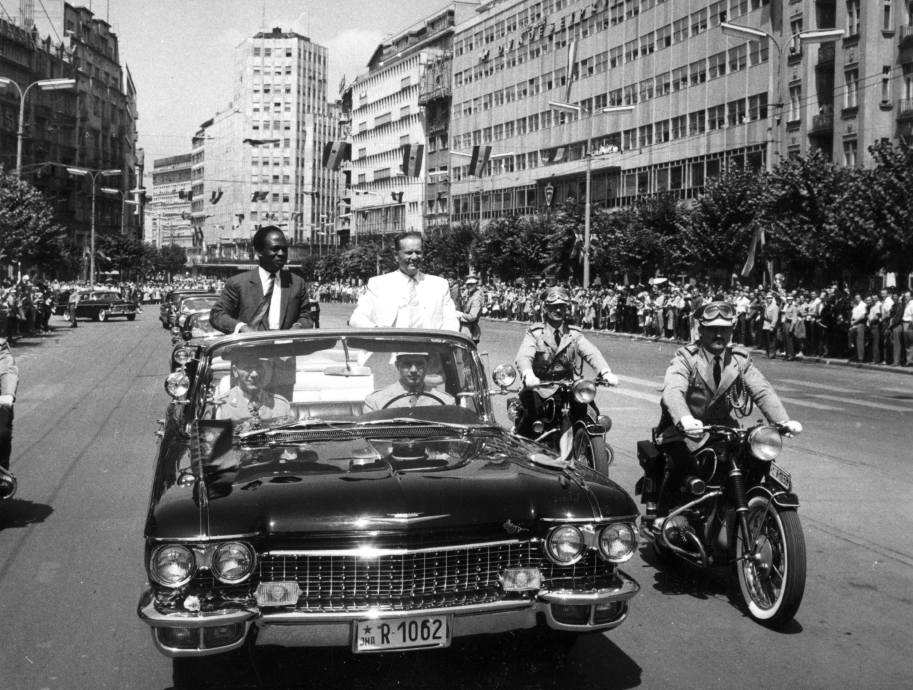
President of Ghana Kwame Nkrumah and President Tito in Belgrade, SR Serbia.

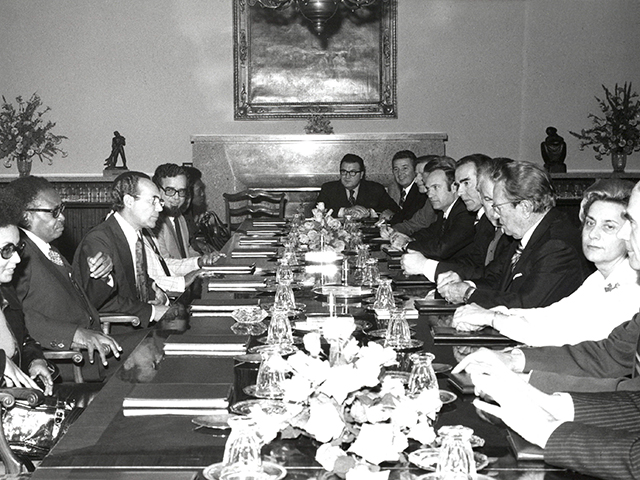
1977 Angola-Yugoslavia official talks on Brijuni islands.

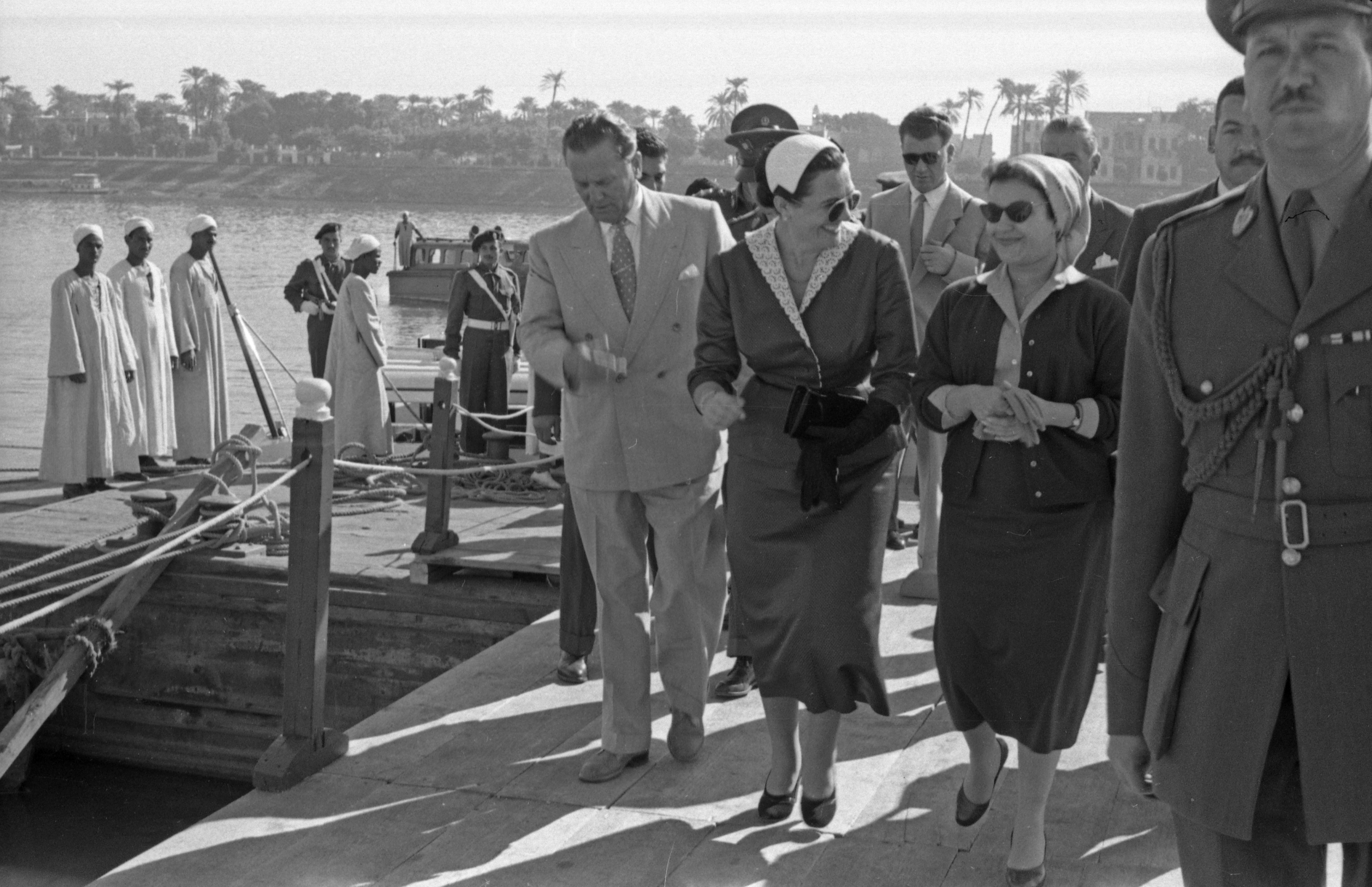
Jovanka Broz and Mrs. el-Shafei together with Josip Broz Tito and Hussein el-Shafei in Luxor

== Yugoslav foreign relations with African states ==
Country	Independence	Formal Relations Began	Notes
Algeria	5 July 1962	2 July 1962	Main article: Algeria–Yugoslavia relations
Angola	11 November 1975	1975	Main article: Angola–Yugoslavia relations
Benin	1 August 1960	1962	
Botswana	30 September 1966	1970	
Burkina Faso	5 August 1960	1968	
Burundi	1 July 1962	1962	Main article: Burundi–Yugoslavia relations
Gabon	17 August 1960	1960	Main article: Gabon–Yugoslavia relations
Gambia	18 February 1965	1965	
Ghana	6 March 1957	1959	Main article: Ghana–Yugoslavia relations
Guinea	2 October 1958	1958	
Guinea-Bissau	10 September 1974	1975	
Egypt	28 February 1922	1 February 1908 (continued relations of the Kingdom of Serbia)	Main article: Egypt–Yugoslavia relations
Equatorial Guinea	12 October 1968	1970	
Ethiopia	never colonized in a classical sense (temporary Italian occupation)	1952	Main article: Ethiopia–Yugoslavia relations
Zambia	24 October 1964	1964	Main article: Yugoslavia–Zambia relations
Zimbabwe	18 April 1980	1980	Main article: Yugoslavia–Zimbabwe relations
Cameroon	1 January 1960	1960	
Cape Verde	5 July 1975	1975	Main article: Cape Verde–Yugoslavia relations
Kenya	12/20 December 1963	1963	
Zaire	30 June 1960	1961	Main article: Democratic Republic of the Congo–Yugoslavia relations
Republic of the Congo	15 August 1960	1964	Main article: Republic of the Congo–Yugoslavia relations
Lesotho	4 October 1966	1972	
Liberia	26 July 1847	1959	
Libya	24 December 1951	1955	Main article: Libya–Yugoslavia relations
Madagascar	26 June 1960	1960	
Mali	22 September 1960	1961	
Morocco	2 March 1956	2 March 1957	Main article: Morocco–Yugoslavia relations
Mauritius	12 March 1968	1969	
Mozambique	25 June 1975	1975	
Namibia	21 March 1990	1990	
Nigeria	1 October 1960	1960	Main article: Nigeria–Yugoslavia relations
Ivory Coast	7 August 1960	1968	
Rwanda	1 July 1962	1971	
Sao Tome and Principe	12 July 1975	1977	
Seychelles	29 June 1976	1977	
Senegal	20 August 1960	1961	
Sierra Leone	27 April 1961	1961	Main article: Sierra Leone–Yugoslavia relations
Swaziland	6 September 1968	1968	
Somalia	1 July 1960	1960	
Sudan	1 January 1956	1956	Main article: Sudan–Yugoslavia relations
Tanzania	1961, 26 April 1964 (unification)	1961	Main article: Tanzania–Yugoslavia relations
Togo	27 April 1960	1960	
Tunisia	20 March 1956	1957	
Uganda	9 October 1962	1963	Main article: Uganda–Yugoslavia relations
Central African Republic	13 August 1960	1960	
Chad	11 August 1960	1966	
Djibouti	27 June 1977	1978	

== See also ==
- Foreign relations of the African Union
- Yugoslavia and the Non-Aligned Movement
- Museum of African Art, Belgrade
- Yugoslavia–European Communities relations
- Africa–China relations
- List of United States ambassadors to the African Union
