= Ghana–Yugoslavia relations =

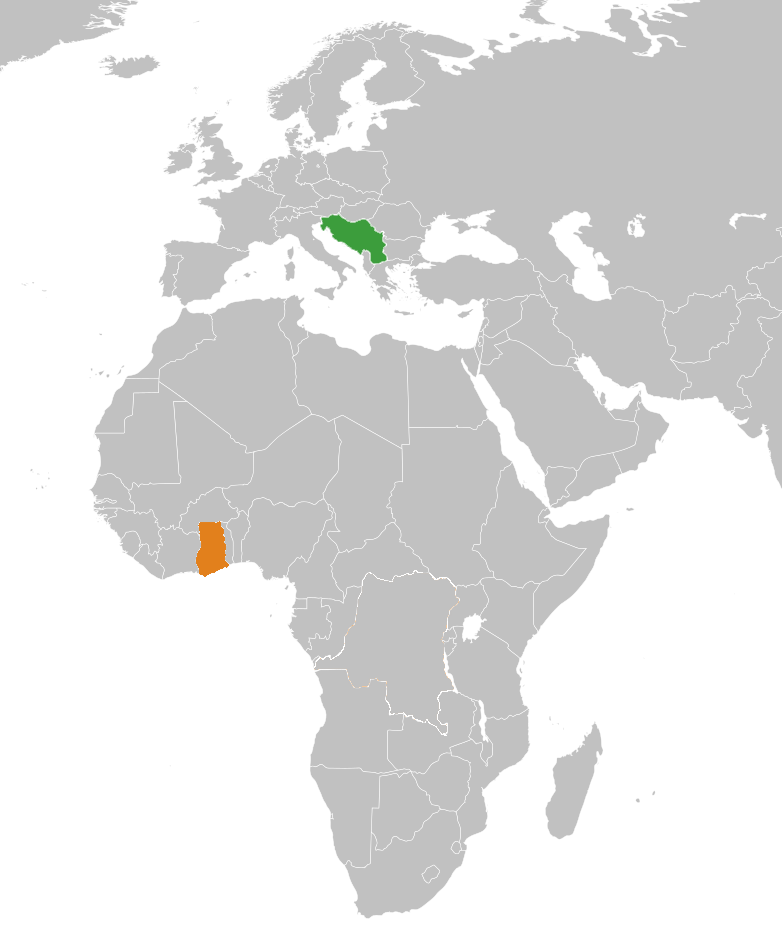

- Yugoslavia: Ghana

Ghana–Yugoslavia relations were historical foreign relations between Ghana and the Socialist Federal Republic of Yugoslavia. Formal diplomatic relations at the level of Embassy were established in 1959. Both countries were the founding member states of the Non-Aligned Movement at the 1961 Non-Aligned Conference in Belgrade. President of Yugoslavia Josip Broz Tito paid his first State visit to Ghana in 1961, just one year after the full independence of the Dominion of Ghana.

== History ==
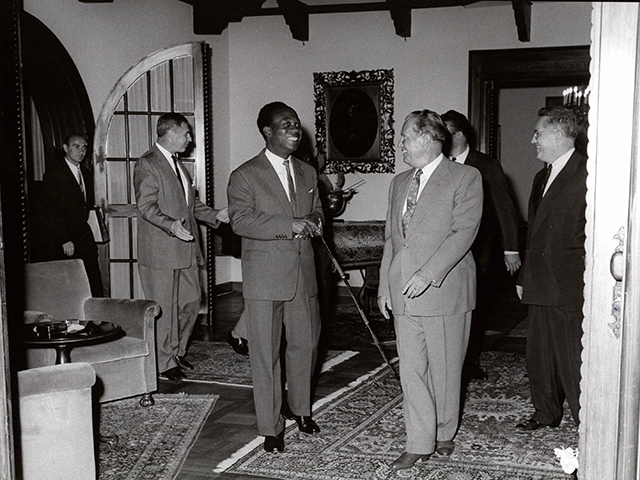
Bilateral talks (1961).

Informal contacts were initiated as early as 1956 when an unsuccessful proposal came from the Ghanaian Erick Nkrumah towards the Yugoslav Delegation at the United Nations to visit Yugoslavia The proposal was not fesable for the delegation so it was rejected. On 24 November 1958 meeting of Trusteeship Council Ghana and Yugoslavia, together with India and Iraq, requested United Nations Secretary General Dag Hammarskjöld to convene a Special Session of the United Nations General Assembly to consider the question of the future of the Trust Territories of British Cameroon and French Cameroon.

During the 1961 President Tito diplomatic tour, the president of Ghana, Kwame Nkrumah, gave the Yugoslav president men's slippers meant symbolize willingness for a long journey, with a message related to positive long-term results of Tito's visit. The president of Yugoslavia was the first foreign leader who was invited to address the Parliament of Ghana since it gained its independence in 1957. Yugoslav delegation gifted Nkrumah with a Yugoslav produced car, the Crvena zastava 1100, and gifted his wife Fathia Nkrumah with a set of violet crystal plates. Other gifts included an X-ray machine, Morava to the city of Accra, a cinema projector to the University of Ghana, a radio, and two sets of toys to gift to the city hospital. Yugoslavia approved loans to Ghana, sent experts, and helped Ghana build a naval base. Economic relations in early years were modest but growing with Ghanaian import from Yugoslavia amounting to 15,383 GBP in 1958, 72,380 GBP in 1959 and 241,462 GBP in 1960.

While the post-coup National Liberation Council in 1966 expelled Chinese and Soviet experts from the country, it didn't take any measure against Yugoslav experts which remained in Ghana. Folklore musical ensemble Tanec from Skopje, Socialist Republic of Macedonia visited Ghana in 1968.

== See also ==
- Ghana and the Non-Aligned Movement
- Yugoslavia and the Non-Aligned Movement
- Yugoslavia and the Organisation of African Unity
- Death and state funeral of Josip Broz Tito
