= Climate of Ghana =

A Köppen climate classification map of Ghana.

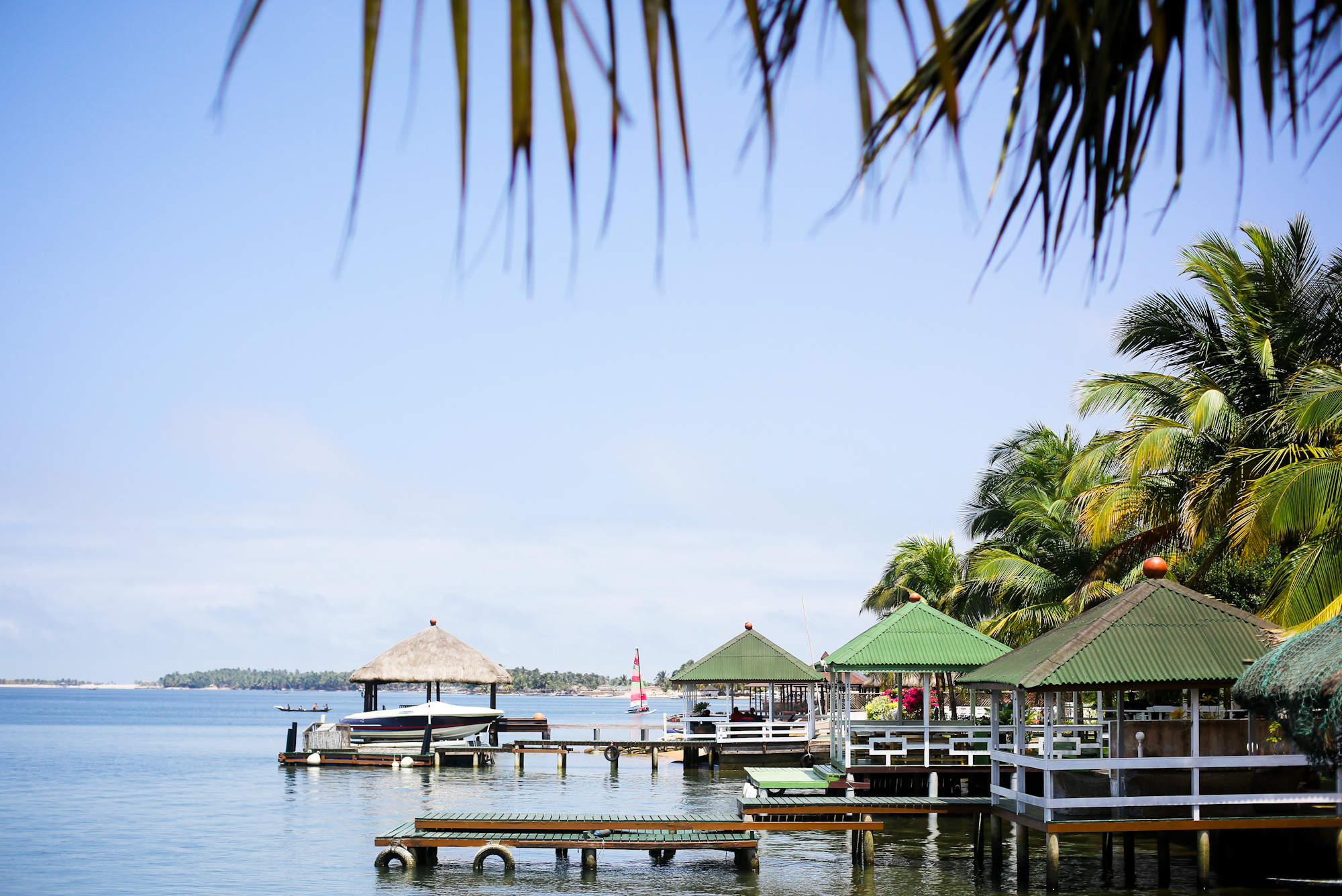
Tropical climatic Lagoons and Vacation Holiday Resorts in Dodi Island on the Volta Lake.

The climate of Ghana is tropical. The eastern coastal belt is warm and comparatively dry, the south-west corner of Ghana is hot and humid, and the north of Ghana is hot and dry. Ghana is located on the Gulf of Guinea, only a few degrees north of the Equator, giving it a warm climate.

== Climate ==
Ghana has a tropical climate with two main seasons: the wet season and the dry season.

In northern Ghana, the rainy season lasts from April to mid-October, while in the south it extends from March to mid-November. The tropical climate of Ghana is relatively mild for its latitude. From December to March, the harmattan - a dry desert wind - blows across northeastern Ghana, reducing humidity and bringing hotter days and cooler nights to the region.

Average daily temperatures in Ghana range from 30°C (86°F) during the day to 24°C (75°F) at night, with relative humidity levels between 77% and 85%. The southern part of the country experiences a bi-modal rainy season, occurring from April to June and again from September to November. In the north, squalls typically occur in March and April, followed by intermittent rainfall until August and September, when precipitation peaks. Annual rainfall varies between 78 and 216 centimetres (31 to 85 inches).

Climate data for Ghana
Month	Jan	Feb	Mar	Apr	May	Jun	Jul	Aug	Sep	Oct	Nov	Dec	Year
Mean daily maximum °C (°F)	30.1 (86.2)	31.2 (88.2)	31.6 (88.9)	31.0 (87.8)	30.0 (86.0)	28.3 (82.9)	27.1 (80.8)	26.8 (80.2)	27.4 (81.3)	28.6 (83.5)	30.0 (86.0)	29.5 (85.1)	29.2 (84.6)
Mean daily minimum °C (°F)	24.5 (76.1)	25.8 (78.4)	26.2 (79.2)	26.2 (79.2)	25.4 (77.7)	24.6 (76.3)	23.5 (74.3)	23.2 (73.8)	23.6 (74.5)	24.2 (75.6)	24.3 (75.7)	24.1 (75.4)	24.6 (76.3)
Average rainfall mm (inches)	13.6 (0.54)	40.3 (1.59)	88.2 (3.47)	115.7 (4.56)	160.7 (6.33)	210.4 (8.28)	121.3 (4.78)	88.9 (3.50)	133.0 (5.24)	128.1 (5.04)	56.5 (2.22)	24.6 (0.97)	1,184.1 (46.62)
Average rainy days	2	2	5	7	11	14	7	6	8	9	4	2	77
Average relative humidity (%)	79	77	77	80	82	85	85	83	82	83	80	79	85
Mean monthly sunshine hours	214	204	223	213	211	144	142	155	171	220	240	235	2,372
Source: weatherbase.com

== Climate change in Ghana ==
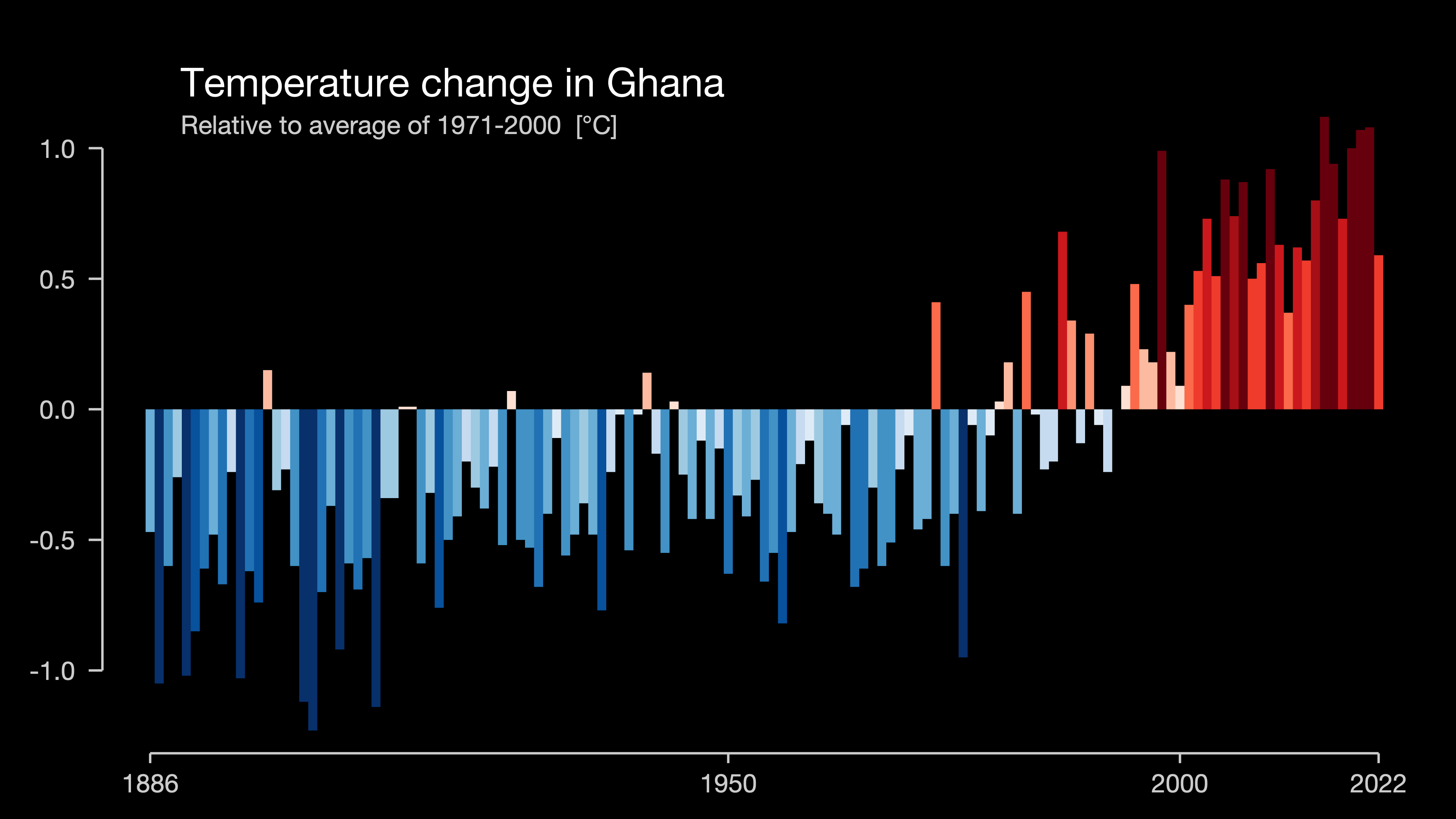
This bar chart is a visual representation of the change in temperature in the past 100+ years. Each stripe represents the temperature averaged over a year. The average temperature from 1971 to 2000 serves as the boundary between blue and red colors. The color scale spans from ±2.6 standard deviations of the annual average temperatures recorded between the years specified in the file name.

Climate change in Ghana is having significant impacts on the people of Ghana. Increasing temperatures and changes in rainfall, extreme weather, drought, wild fires, floods and sea-level rise are expected to negatively affect the country's infrastructure, hydropower production, food security, and coastal and agricultural livelihoods such as farming and fisheries. Ghana's economy will be impacted by climate change, due to its dependence on climate-sensitive sectors such as agriculture, energy, and forestry.

Climate change is expected worsen Ghana's water security problems, and this will have socioeconomic consequences. Agriculture and access to safe and reliable drinking water will be impacted. Reduced water supply will have a negative impact on hydropower, which provides 54% of the country's electricity capacity. Additionally, Ghana will likely see a rise in diseases like malaria, dengue fever and cholera due to changes in water conditions.

Climate change is expected to have different impacts across the country. The north of the country, which has a typically hot and dry climate, will become hotter and wetter, and increasing rainfall variability is expected to decrease crop yields, which could drive poverty and migration. The wetter south is predicted to experience a decrease in rainfall.

Ghana signed the Paris Climate Agreement in 2016. Their existing 2015 Intended Nationally Determined Contribution then became their Nationally Determined Contribution, which was reviewed in 2021. Ghana aims to avoid 64 million metric tons of greenhouse gas emissions by 2030, compared to a business-as-usual scenario for 2020-2030. The country has committed to net zero by 2060.
