= Borborbor =

Ghanaian and Togolese Ewe dance

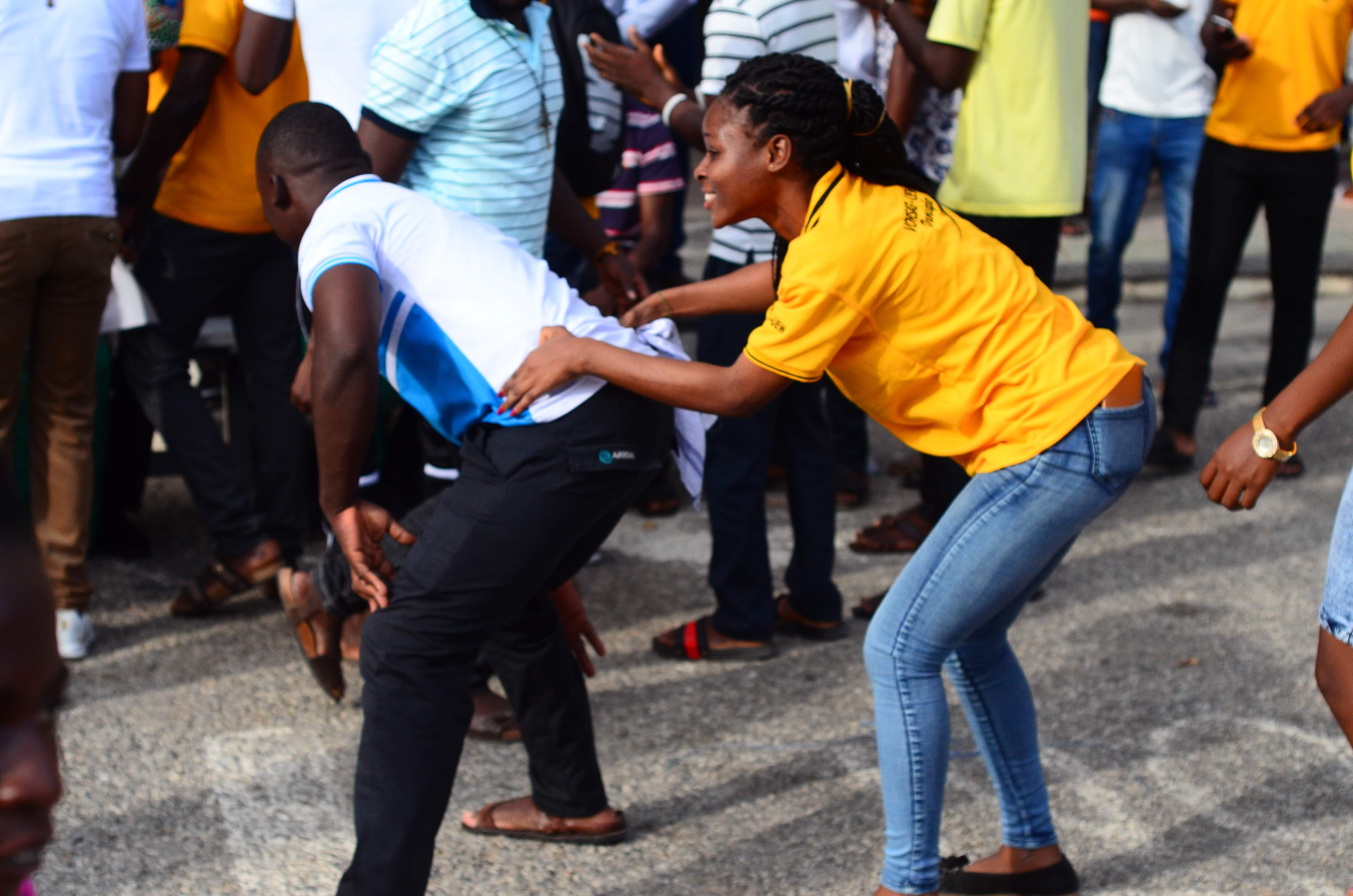
- Borborbor dance
- Origin: Ewe of Ghana and Togo

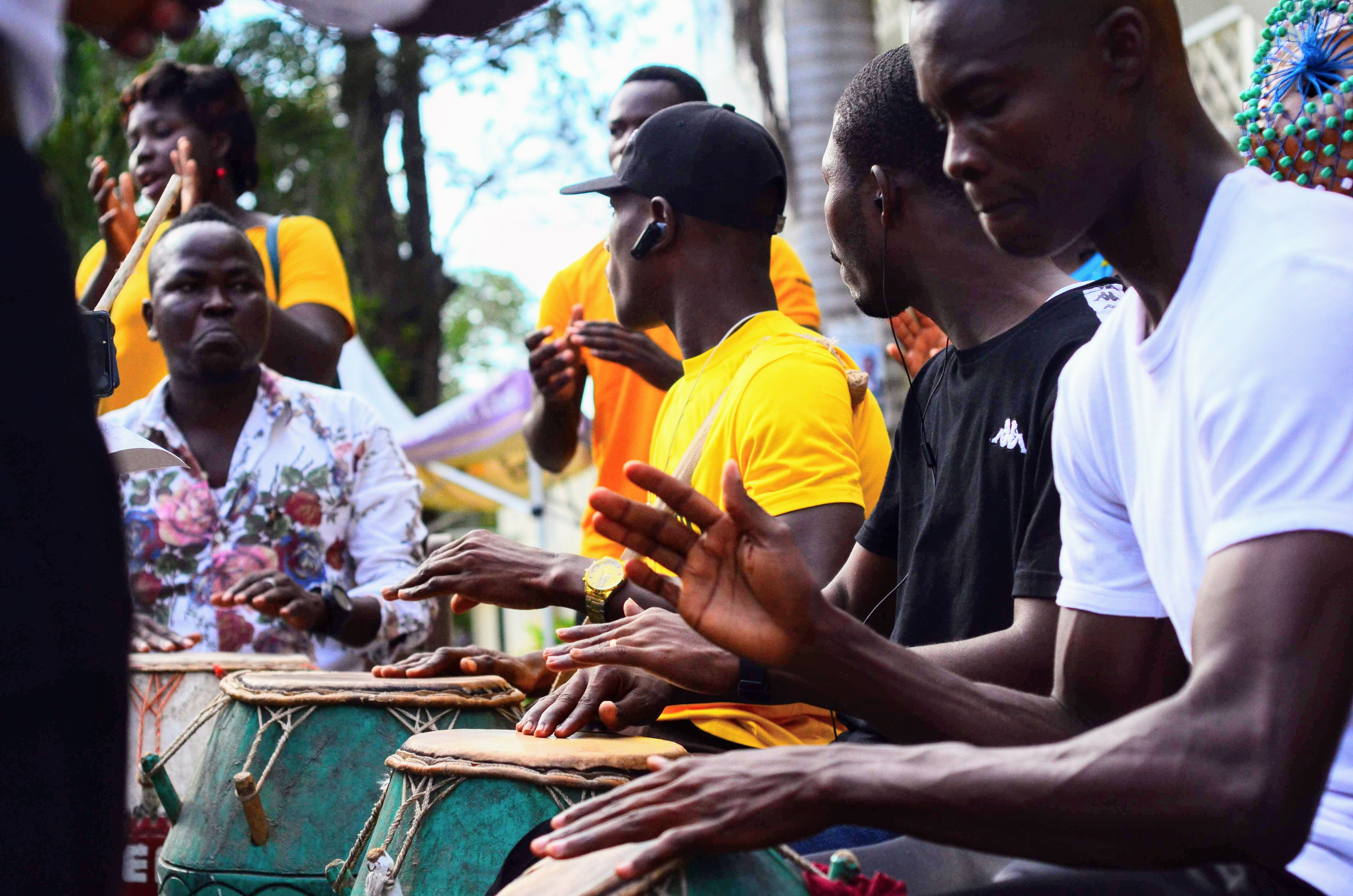
Borborbor drummers.

Borborbor (also known as Akpese) is a Ghanaian and Togolese traditional dance performed by the Ewe people from the Volta region of Ghana and Southern Togo , including Kpalime and Lomé. The dance is performed especially during the festival of the chiefs and people of communities. This dance is believed to have originated with Mr. Francis Kudzo Nuatro in the 1950s. It's a cultural and social recreational dance performed by the Ewe people in the Volta Region of Ghana, an area north of the Anlo Ewe of southeastern Ghana and some Togolese.

The borborbor music has been internationally recognized for the past half a century by Nketia, Jones, and Amu before spreading to the ends of Chernoff, Agawu, Avorgbedor, Burns, Fiagbedzi, Dor, Pantaleoni, Locke, and many others.

== History of Borborbor ==
=== Costumes ===
The dance is mainly female-based, and they wear colorful long garments with two white handkerchiefs
