= Ghana and the Non-Aligned Movement =

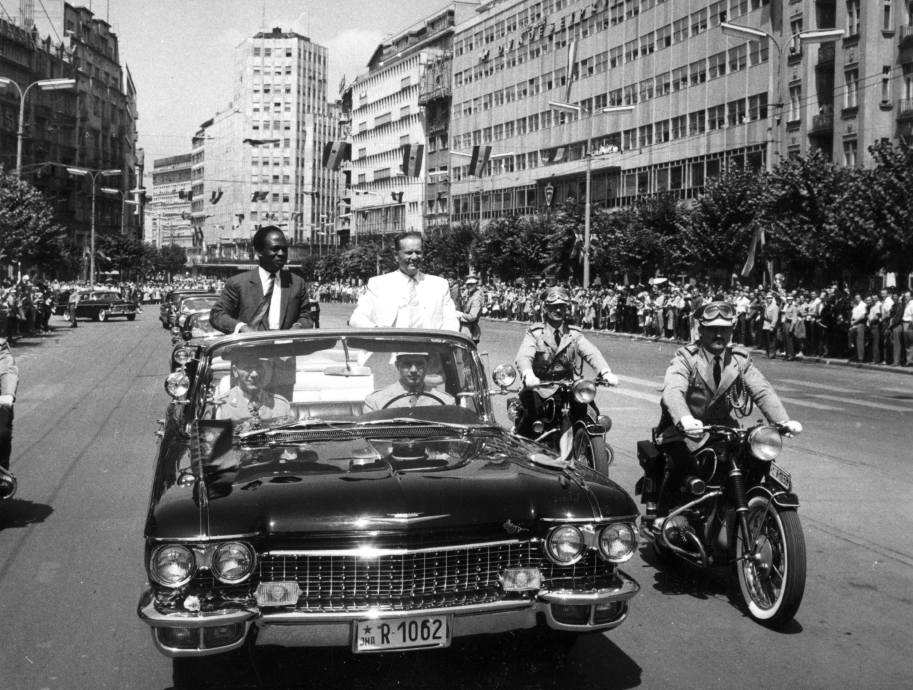
President of Ghana Kwame Nkrumah with President of Yugoslavia Josip Broz Tito arriving at the 1st Summit of the Non-Aligned Movement in 1961 in Belgrade (Terazije with Palace Albanija in the background)

Ghana has been a member state of the Non-Aligned Movement since the time of the 1st Summit of the Non-Aligned Movement in 1961 in Belgrade. As the first decolonized country in Sub-Saharan Africa, Ghana actively participated in earliest efforts to initiate Pan-African and Non-Aligned cooperation. Ghana, together with SFR Yugoslavia, India, Indonesia, and Egypt, was one of the five countries that initiated the establishment of the movement.

The first President of Ghana Kwame Nkrumah, together with some other prominent African leaders at the time such as Julius Nyerere from Tanzania and Gamal Abdel Nasser from Egypt, joined hands with non-African leaders from countries beyond Cold War bloc divides, including Josip Broz Tito of Yugoslavia, Jawaharlal Nehru of India and Sukarno of Indonesia, in building what would become known as the Non-Aligned Movement. The country believed that the Non-Aligned framework might help to shield Africa from becoming directly involved in destructive Cold War United States-Soviet Union rivalries, while providing enough space for collective activist foreign policy aimed at supporting anticolonial liberation movements and African unity. In this respect, some scholars compared the Ghanaian approach towards the Non-Aligned Movement with the Monroe Doctrine, stressing how Ghanaian leadership aimed to create an African Monroe Doctrine that would protect the continent from external powers.

The foreign policy of Ghana was deeply shaped by the principles of Non-Alignment in the belief that they alone might be the reliable route towards African unity. During the 1st Summit of the Non-Aligned Movement in 1961 in Belgrade, President Nkrumah called upon other participants to end colonialism, to work on the reform of the United Nations and to act as a "moral force" to avoid war between the Eastern and Western Bloc. The Ghanaian principled Non-Aligned position at the conference was perceived as remarkable in light of the concurrent Congo Crisis and the murder of Patrice Lumumba, which was expected to trigger potentially stronger anti-western reactions. This expectation was exacerbated by the fact that Ghana was a part of the more radical and African nationalist Casablanca Group, as opposed to the Brazzaville Group, with only countries from the first group attending the Belgrade conference.

== See also ==
- Tanzania and the Non-Aligned Movement
- Egypt and the Non-Aligned Movement
- Ghana–Yugoslavia relations
