= Climate change in Ghana =

Emissions, impacts and responses of Ghana related to climate change

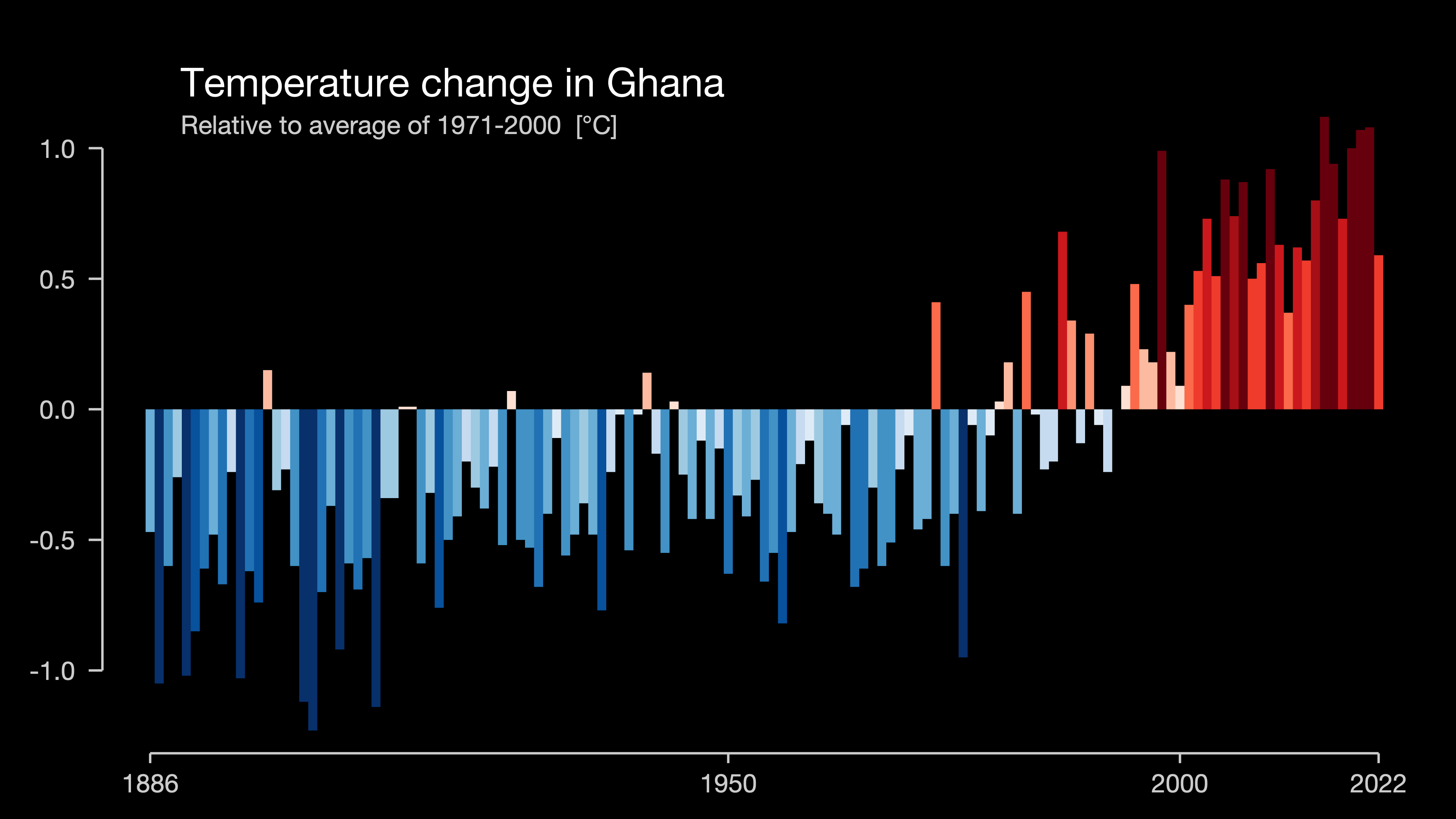
This bar chart is a visual representation of the change in temperature in the past 100+ years. Each stripe represents the temperature averaged over a year. The average temperature from 1971 to 2000 serves as the boundary between blue and red colors. The color scale spans from ±2.6 standard deviations of the annual average temperatures recorded between the years specified in the file name.

Climate change in Ghana is having significant impacts on the people of Ghana. Increasing temperatures and changes in rainfall, extreme weather, drought, wild fires, floods and sea-level rise are expected to negatively affect the country's infrastructure, hydropower production, food security, and coastal and agricultural livelihoods such as farming and fisheries. Ghana's economy will be impacted by climate change, due to its dependence on climate-sensitive sectors such as agriculture, energy, and forestry.

Climate change is expected worsen Ghana's water security problems, and this will have socioeconomic consequences. Agriculture and access to safe and reliable drinking water will be impacted. Reduced water supply will have a negative impact on hydropower, which provides 54% of the country's electricity capacity. Additionally, Ghana will likely see a rise in diseases like malaria, dengue fever and cholera due to changes in water conditions.

Climate change is expected to have different impacts across the country. The north of the country, which has a typically hot and dry climate, will become hotter and wetter, and increasing rainfall variability is expected to decrease crop yields, which could drive poverty and migration. The wetter south is predicted to experience a decrease in rainfall.

Ghana signed the Paris Climate Agreement in 2016. Their existing 2015 Intended Nationally Determined Contribution then became their Nationally Determined Contribution, which was reviewed in 2021. Ghana aims to avoid 64 million metric tons of greenhouse gas emissions by 2030, compared to a business-as-usual scenario for 2020-2030. The country has committed to net zero by 2060.

== Greenhouse gas emissions ==
CO2 emissions by sector, 2021
1. Transport (47.0%)
2. Electricity and heat producers (34.4%)
3. Industry (11.7%)
4. Residential (3.63%)
5. Agriculture (1.14%)
6. Fishing (1.14%)
7. Commercial and public services (0.55%)
8. Other energy industries (0.42%)

In 2023, Ghana emitted around 52 million tons of greenhouse gases, (about 1.5 tons per person), equivalent to around 0.1% of the global total emissions.

In 2021, Ghana's total CO2 emissions from fuel combustion in the energy sector reached 21.397 million tones, highlighting a significant increase of 332% in per-capita emissions since 2000. Despite representing only 0.1% of global emissions from inflammable fuels, this rise is concerning, particularly in international efforts to mitigate climate change impacts. West Africa is among the smallest contributors to global greenhouse gas emissions, but the nations "are already feeling the effects of the climate catastrophe disproportionately".

Carbon dioxide (CO_{2}) makes up the vast majority of greenhouse gas emissions from the sector, but smaller amounts of methane (CH_{4}) and nitrous oxide (N_{2}O) are also emitted. These gases are released during the combustion of fossil fuels, such as coal, oil, and natural gas, to produce electricity.

=== Fossil fuel production ===
The Jubilee offshore oil field in the Western Region of Ghana began production in 2010, raising expectations for wealth creation in Ghana. However, the infrastructure needed to support Ghana's oil industry (storage, shipping, processing) has necessitated the practice of flaring. "Long-term gas flaring at the Jubilee Field may be inevitable" without accelerated development of infrastructure and would produce about 1.5 million tons of CO_{2} annually (7 percent of Ghana's total national emissions).

Ghana's petroleum sector has experienced significant growth, particularly since the discovery of oil in commercial quantities in the Jubilee fields in 2007. Average crude oil production capacity has been declining slightly over time, with an average 176,000 barrels per day in September 2021.

Some of the major oil and gas activities are conducted by international oil companies such as Tullow Ghana, Vitol, Kosmos Energy, and ENI, among others. Their sub-contractors include Schlumberger, Baker Hughes, Weatherford, Ocean Rig, and Technip FMC, among others. The sector has been the subject of investment disputes, such as the one between the Springfield Group and ENI/Vitol.

Upstream activities in the Ghanaian petroleum sector include the procurement and refining of crude oil by the nation's only petroleum refinery, Tema Oil Refinery (TOR). Downstream activities include the marketing and distribution of petroleum products by Oil Marketing Companies (OMCs) and the pre-mixing of petroleum products for other industrial uses. OMCs operating in Ghana are mainly multinationals; however, the last decade has seen an increase in the establishment of several small and medium-sized local OMCs.

The Ghana National Petroleum Council (GNPC) has the mandate to explore for oil within the nation's territory. Ghana's oil and gas prospects are significant. Recent discoveries appear to indicate oil and gas resources stretch across the country's shoreline from Cape Three Points in the west to Keta in the east. The Volta Basin is also believed to hold oil and gas reserves onshore. The Government of Ghana, through GNPC, seeks to maximize the country's prospects in the oil and gas sector and extend the country's continental shelf to increase the sector's scope.

The prices of petroleum products are regulated by an independent board. The nation consumes significant volumes of petroleum products, which are mainly imported. The petroleum products produced in Ghana are mainly exported.

== Climate change institutions ==
One of the few important climate change institutions in Ghana is the Center for Climate Change and Sustainability Studies. The center is located in the University of Ghana and it is involved in conducting various research works and projects with regards to climate change in Ghana. It is also a multidisciplinary faculty which explores areas such as health, resource management, economics and renewable energy. All of these research areas they venture into are targeted towards capacity building in climate change and sustainable development.

== Impacts on the natural environment ==
=== Temperature and weather changes ===
Köppen climate classification map for Ghana for 1980–2016

2071–2100 map under the worst climate change scenario. Mid-range scenarios are currently considered more likely

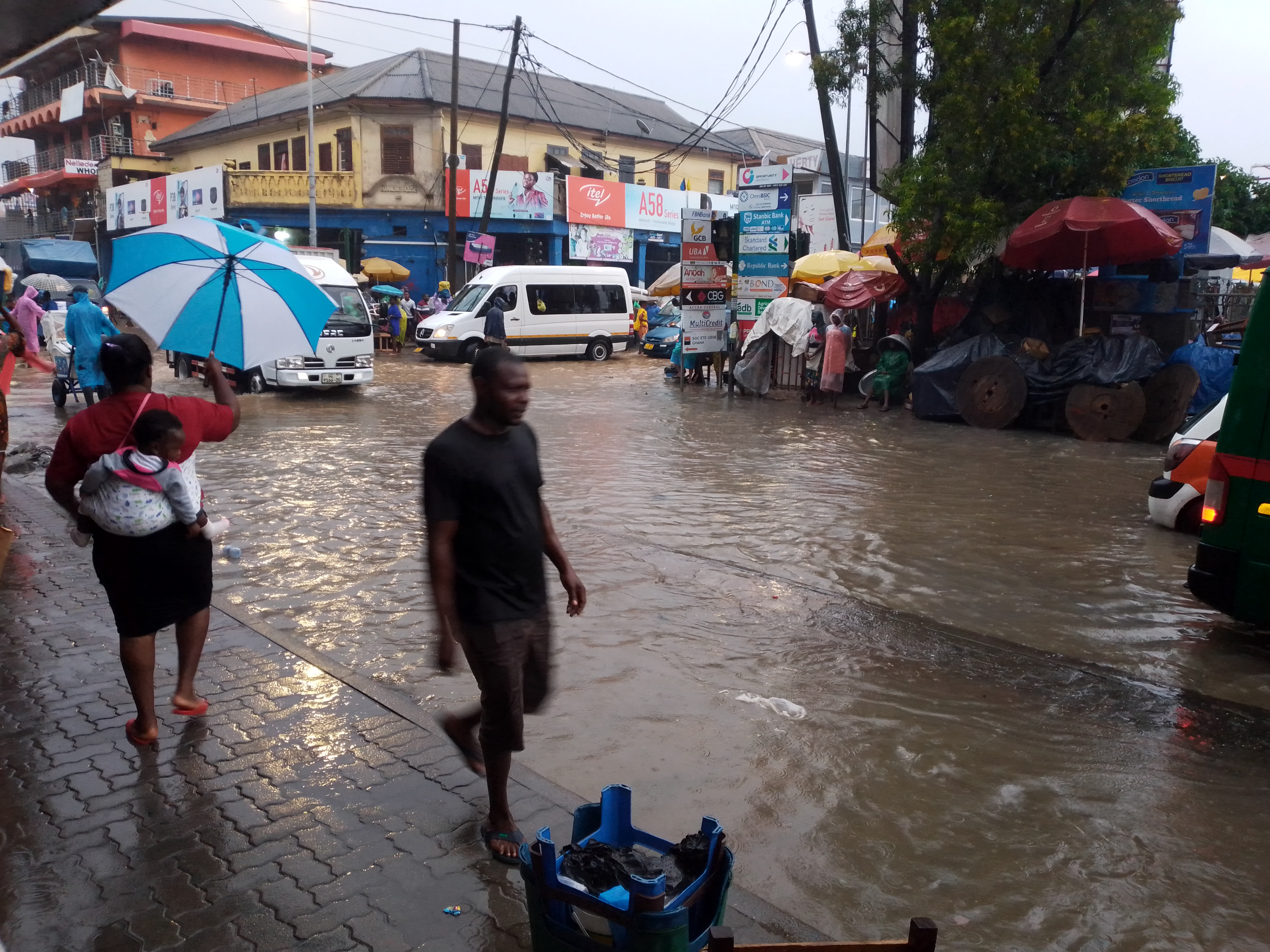
Many parts of Accra flood during the rainy season, causing environmental crisis in Ghana

Lake Volta, the largest artificial lake by surface area in the world, changed climate patterns in Ghana.

The drier northern areas have warmed more rapidly than southern Ghana. Overall, Ghana has experienced a 1.0 °C increase in temperature since 1960. Northern Ghana has only one rainy season, while southern Ghana has two, and annual rainfall is highly variable. Long-term trends for rainfall are challenging to predict. However, USDA's Forest Service concluded in 2011 that there was "no evidence that extreme rain events have either increased or decreased since 1960."

However, when one compares the Köppen-Geiger climate classification map for 1980–2016 and the projected map for 2071–2100 predicted change in classification from "tropical, savannah" to "arid, steppe, hot" in some coastal areas.

=== Sea level rise ===
Available data also shows a sea level rise of 2.1 mm per year over the last 30 years, indicating a surge of 5.8 cm, 16.5 cm, and 34.5 cm by 2020, 2050, and 2080. Flooding affects approximately "45,000 Ghanaians every year, and half of Ghana's coastline is vulnerable to erosion and flooding as a result of sea-level rise".

=== Water resources ===
Expected decreases in water in the primary river basins providing fresh water for the country, Volta River, Bia River, and Tano River, could increase challenges in getting access to clean drinking water. The volume of water in the Volta Basin was predicted to have a 24% and 45% reduction in 2050 and 2100, respectively. The continuous decrease in precipitation and increasing evaporation rate has the potential to cause political tension in the region as Burkina Faso plans to draw water from the Volta Basin.

== Impacts on people ==
=== Economic impacts ===
==== Agriculture ====
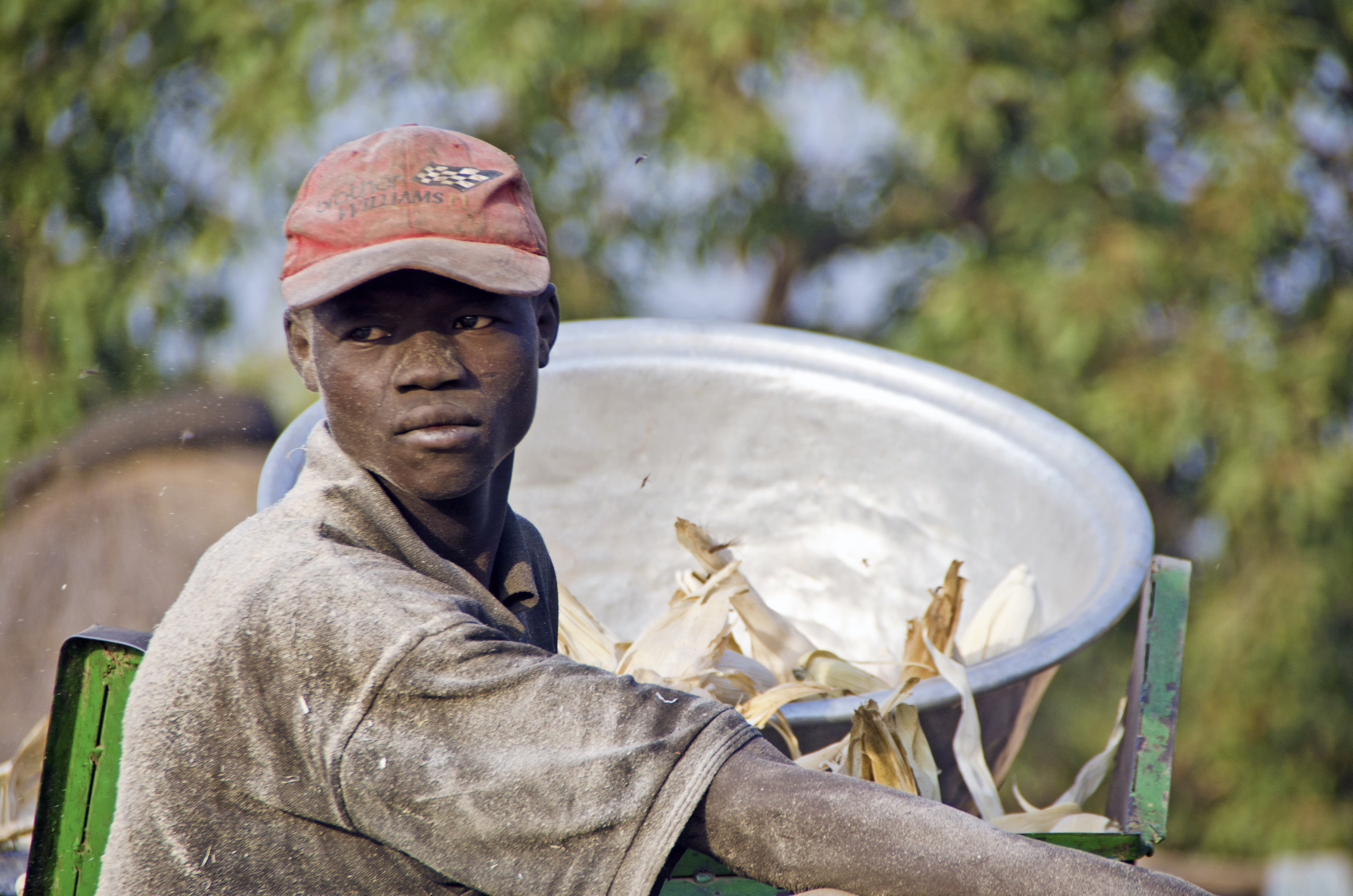
Maize farmer in Tamaligu, Ghana, Northern Region

Forty-five percent of the workforce in Ghana depends on small-holder rain-fed agriculture. Disruption due to erratic rainfall and other extreme weather will harm people's economic well-being. Moreover, staple crops such as Cassava, Maize, and cocoa (the major cash crop of Ghana) are expected to see decreased production. Based on a 20-year baseline climate observation, it is forecasted that maize and other cereal crop yields will reduce by 7% by 2050.

Moreover, the combination of deforestation and new dams that dried up rivers has affected agriculture and, in turn, brought migration to Accra, which increased poor-quality unplanned settlements in the path of potential flash floods.

A 2024 World Bank report estimates that about two million Ghanaians are vulnerable to food insecurity. Should any natural disaster occur, food availability will be significantly affected, particularly in the Northern region and the country's rural areas.

==== Fisheries ====
Seafood makes up 40–60 percent of protein intake in Ghana. Key species for the economy are expected to have worse reproduction cycles. Reduction in fisheries production has stimulated importation of more $200 million per year worth of seafood. Climate change alone might endanger a vital food source and way of life for Ghana by reducing possible fish catches by 25% or more by 2050.

==== Hydropower ====
Because 54% of the national generation capacity is hydropower, unpredictable rainfall is likely to add uncertainty to a power grid already experiencing frequent outages (known as dumsor). Some estimates suggest that capacity could fall by as much as 50% for the Volta Basin. Ghana experienced a reduction in GDP between 2012 and 2015 in partial response to a deficient supply of power.

=== Health impacts ===
An increase in waterborne diseases such as cholera and mosquito-borne diseases like malaria is projected. In Ghana, flood-exposed communities have been associated with cholera and non-cholera diarrheal disease outbreaks. According to the World Bank, Ghana's health system is highly vulnerable to the changes in climate, "especially to illnesses like malaria and diarrhea disease ... health issues related to heat, air pollution, and infectious diseases are on the rise with the elderly, youth, and children being particularly vulnerable". As climate change results in more severe and frequent flooding, water source contamination and the spread of waterborne diseases are expected to increase. Stagnant water bodies which are formed as a result of some flooding occurrences, may support mosquitoes breeding which can cause the increase in the spread of malaria. A study conducted in two flood-prone and low-income areas, namely James Town and Agbogbloshie within the Accra Metropolitan Area, revealed that households experience regular cholera outbreaks and a high prevalence of non-cholera diarrhea and other illnesses. These low-income communities also have a large percentage of children under 5 years old who may have weakened immune systems and be particularly vulnerable to environmental challenges.

== Mitigation and adaptation ==
Ghana signed the Paris Agreement on 22 April 2016 and ratified it on 21 September 2016. The first national climate change adaptation strategy in Ghana was developed to be implemented between 2010 and 2020. The Ministry of Environment Science, Technology and Innovation published a policy framework in 2013.

In 2015, Ghana developed a framework entitled "Ghana's Intended Nationally Determined Contribution" to outline a plan to reduce carbon emissions and to improve eternity of land use, transportation, and other economic and societal sectors. This plan, after the 2016 Paris Agreement signing, became the Nationally Determined Contribution (NDC). Ghana has pledged to adopt 34 strategies to reduce greenhouse gas emissions, with 9 being implemented independently and 25 dependent on external support. The goal is to cut emissions by 64 million metric tons of CO_{2} equivalent (MtCO2e) by 2030, compared to the total emissions expected between 2020 and 2030. Ghana has also committed to net zero by 2060.

In 2021, Ghana updated its NDCs to span the time period (2020-2030). Ghana aims to implement nine unconditional actions that would result in 8.5 MtCO2e emissions reductions by 2025 and a further 24.6 MtCO2e by 2030 compared to the 2020-2030 cumulative emissions in a baseline scenario. the updated NDC spans 47 total action programs (34 mitigation measures and 13 adaptation measures) and 19 policy areas and 10 priority sectors.

Ghana is experiencing population growth, has a high poverty rate, and its economy is dependent on vulnerable industries like agriculture. Thus, it is a West African country with increased risk of climate vulnerability, including droughts and floods, hunger and disease, that increase human suffering, violence, displacement, and economic collapse in the region.

Ghanaian President Nana Akufo-Addo, the President of Ghana stated, "Our hope depends on the actions we take today." However, Ghana still needs to develop long-term contingency plans for climate change because decision-makers and local managers have an inadequate perception of the costs of dealing with such crises. A 2022 report by the World Bank report noted that Ghana has slowed progress in its economic development and has not fully converted its natural wealth into sufficient infrastructure, human, and institutional capital for sustained growth, but taking a climate resilient and low-carbon pathway could turn challenges into opportunities. With appropriate reforms and investments, it will be possible for Ghana to "deliver large economic and social benefits for its people".

=== Adaptation ===
Ghana became a party to the UNFCCC in September 1995, and ratified the Paris Agreement in September 2016. As a party to the Paris Agreement, Ghana is expected to develop a National Adaptation Plan, that outlines strategies the country is taking to adjust to the changing climatic conditions.

Climate change adaptation involves modifying or developing structure to help one live with the influence of actual or expected future climate. The goal of adaptation is to reduce the impacts of the harmful effects of climate change (like sea-level rise, more intense extreme weather events, or food insecurity). It also includes making the most of any potential beneficial opportunities associated with climate change.

Ghana's development—both human and economic—is susceptible to climate change. Around 45,000 Ghanaians are impacted by flooding annually on average, and half of the country's coastline is at risk of erosion and flooding due to sea level rise. Without immediate action, crop and labor productivity will be impacted by rising temperatures and heat stress, and infrastructure and structures will be harmed by more unpredictable rainfall patterns. Human capital and productivity will also be hampered by local air pollution, water insecurity, and land degradation.

It is approximated that climate change will add to the human and economic toll of floods and droughts in Ghana, which will have direct impacts on key development areas like food security, water resource management, health, and economic growth.

Against this backdrop, the government of Ghana and other International Development Partners, have set out approaches to determine vulnerability and adaptation priorities, and to join this knowledge into development and sectoral planning.
