= Irreligion in Ghana =

Irreligion in a country

Irreligion in Ghana is difficult to measure in the country, as regular demographic polling is not widespread and available statistics are often many years old. Most Ghanaian nationals claim the Christian (71%) or Muslim (18%) faiths. Many atheists in Ghana are not willing to openly express their beliefs due to the fear of persecution. Most secondary educational institutions also have some form of religious affiliation. This is evident in the names of schools like Presbyterian Boys School, Holy Child School and many others. Atheists form a very small minority in Ghana.

In the Ghana census taken in 2010, Christians make up 71.2% of the population, Islam 17.6%, Irreligion 5.3%, Traditional religion 5.2%. Other faiths include Hinduism, Buddhism and Nichiren Buddhism, Taoism, Sōka Gakkai, Shinto and Judaism.

Contrary to the generally accepted view that all Ghanaians profess one religion or the other, there is a small group of outspoken atheists, freethinkers and skeptics who form the Humanist Association of Ghana. The group organized a Humanist conference in November, 2012 which brought together Humanists from around the world to discuss issues relevant to the advancement of Humanism in Ghana.

A second International Humanist conference was hosted by the same organization in December 2014. It featured discussions on additional topics relevant to Humanism such as feminism, witchcraft accusations in West Africa and Humanist ceremonies. The organization currently has about fifty members and attracts limited media coverage. Work is still in progress to officially register the association and make it more broadly known in civic society.

Humanism is not well known in Ghana and this, coupled with high levels of religious belief in Ghana makes it difficult for nonbelievers to share their opinions freely without fear of stigma. There have been a few debates conducted by humanists in the country regarding what should be considered core humanist principles and what should be shifted to the broad spectrum of secularity.

Openly professing atheism or antireligious beliefs can lead to public outrage, such as when the popular hiplife artist Mzbel stated that Jesus was a fake.

== See also ==
- Religion in Ghana
- Christianity in Ghana
- Islam in Ghana
- Demographics of Ghana
