= Svijet =

Women's magazine in Yugoslavia (1953–1992)

- Categories: Women's magazine
- Frequency: Biweekly
- Founded: 1953
- Final issue: 1992
- Company: Vjesnik
- Country: Yugoslavia
- Based in: Zagreb
- Language: Croatian

Svijet (Croatian: World) was a biweekly women's magazine which was in circulation between 1953 and 1992. It was based in Zagreb, Yugoslavia, and was one of the magazines produced by Vjesnik, a leading publishing company in Yugoslavia.

== History and profile ==
Svijet was established in 1953. The magazine was published by Vjesnik on a biweekly basis. It was headquartered in Zagreb. Ðurđa Milanović was one of the editors-in-chief of the magazine.

Svijet featured articles on women-related topics, including fashion, cosmetics, theater, film, and novels. However, it also covered political content, including working conditions of women, their educational and health status. It published interviews one of which was with Jovanka Broz, wife of Josip Tito. The first advice section was introduced by Svijet in Yugoslavia in 1958. The magazine shared content with its sister publications such as Vjesnik u srijedu and Arena.

Svijet folded in 1992.
