= Relay of Youth =

Symbolic annual relay race in Yugoslavia

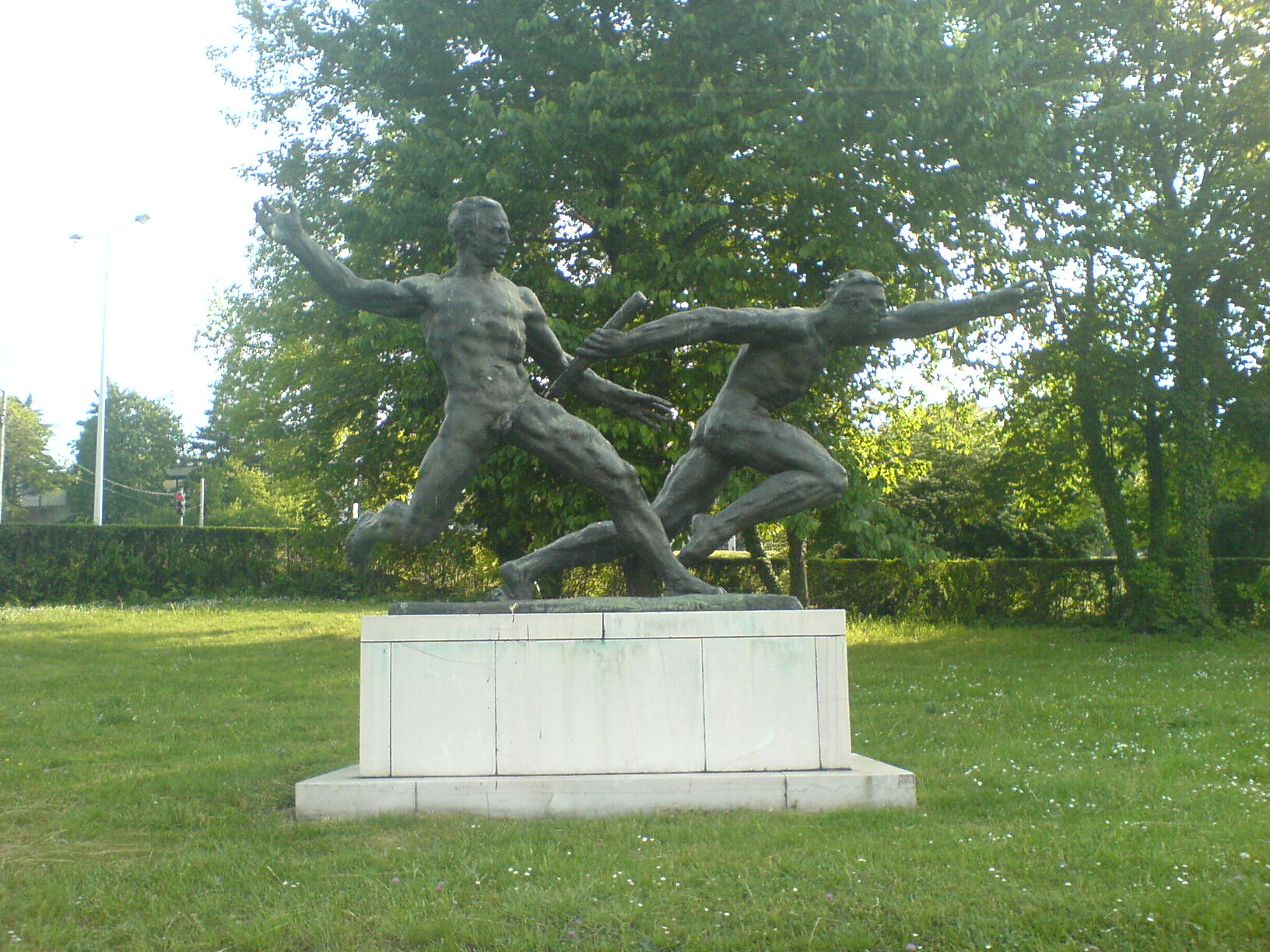
- Monument to relay carriers near Partizan Stadium in Belgrade.
- Date: 1957–1988
- Location: Yugoslavia

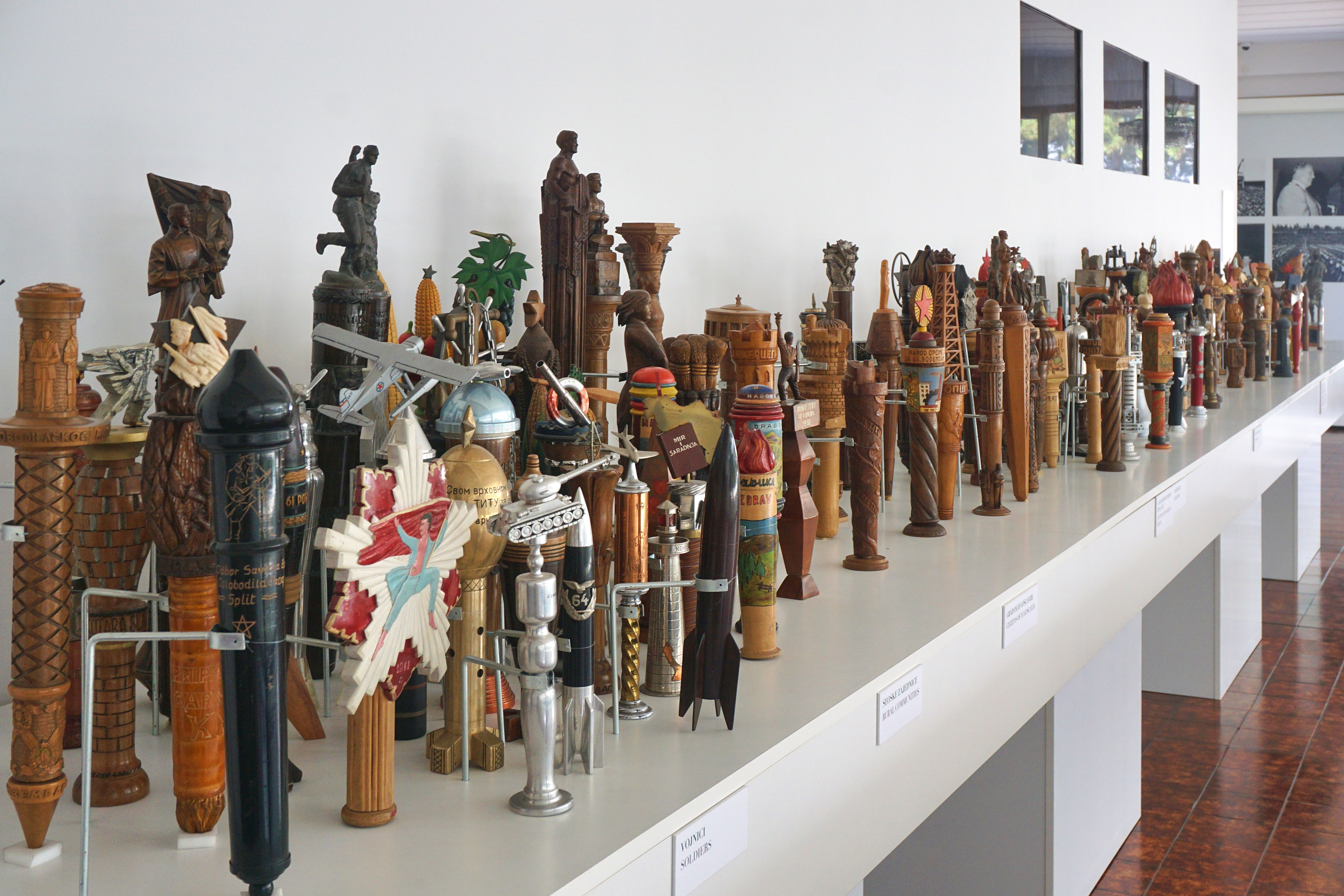
Batons sent by various organizations and groups to Tito at the House of Flowers (within the Museum of Yugoslavia), Dedinje, Belgrade.

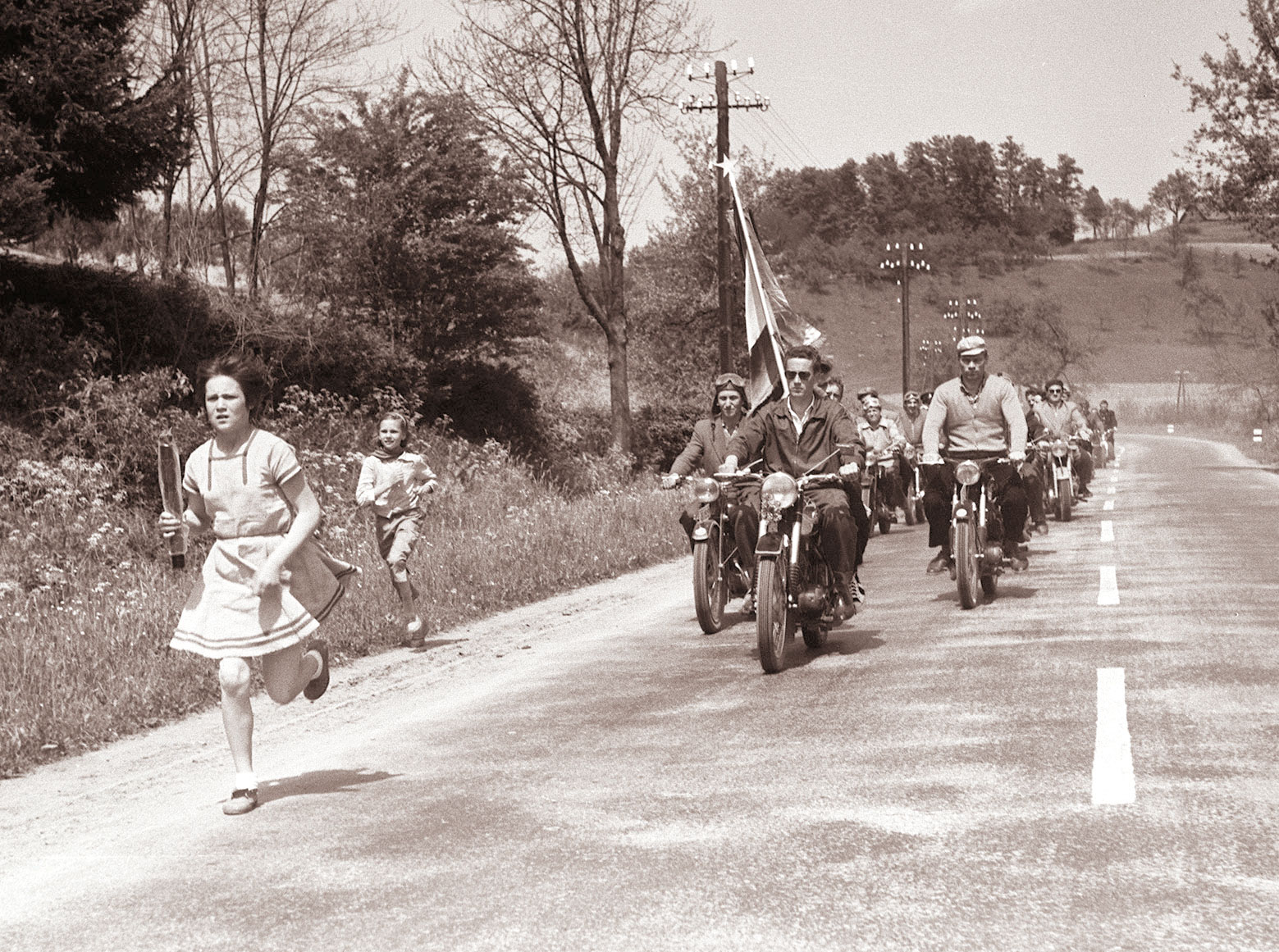
Relay of Youth in Slovenia (1960)

The Relay of Youth (Serbo-Croatian and Slovene: Štafeta mladosti, Serbian Cyrillic: Штафета младости, Macedonian: Штафета на младоста, Albanian: Stafeta e Rinise) was a symbolic relay race held in Socialist Federal Republic of Yugoslavia every year. The relay carried a baton with a birthday pledge to Josip Broz Tito ostensibly from all young people of Yugoslavia. The race usually started in Tito's birth town Kumrovec and went through all major towns and cities of the country. It ended in Belgrade at JNA Stadium on May 25, Tito's official birthday and Day of Youth, a national holiday.

The relay first took place in 1945 and was formalized as a national holiday in 1957. It went on after Tito's death in 1980 and was last held in 1988.

In 1987, the winning poster design for the relay caused a national scandal, as it was revealed to have been based on a Nazi propaganda poster. The authors, the design division of Neue Slowenische Kunst, submitted the design in order to protest Tito's cult of personality, of which the relay was a major part. Along with the rising crisis of the Yugoslav state, this scandal is deemed to have significantly contributed to the decision to discontinue the Relay.
