= House of Flowers (mausoleum) =

Mausoleum, resting place of Josip Broz Tito and Jovanka Broz

- Кућа цвећа Kuća cveća
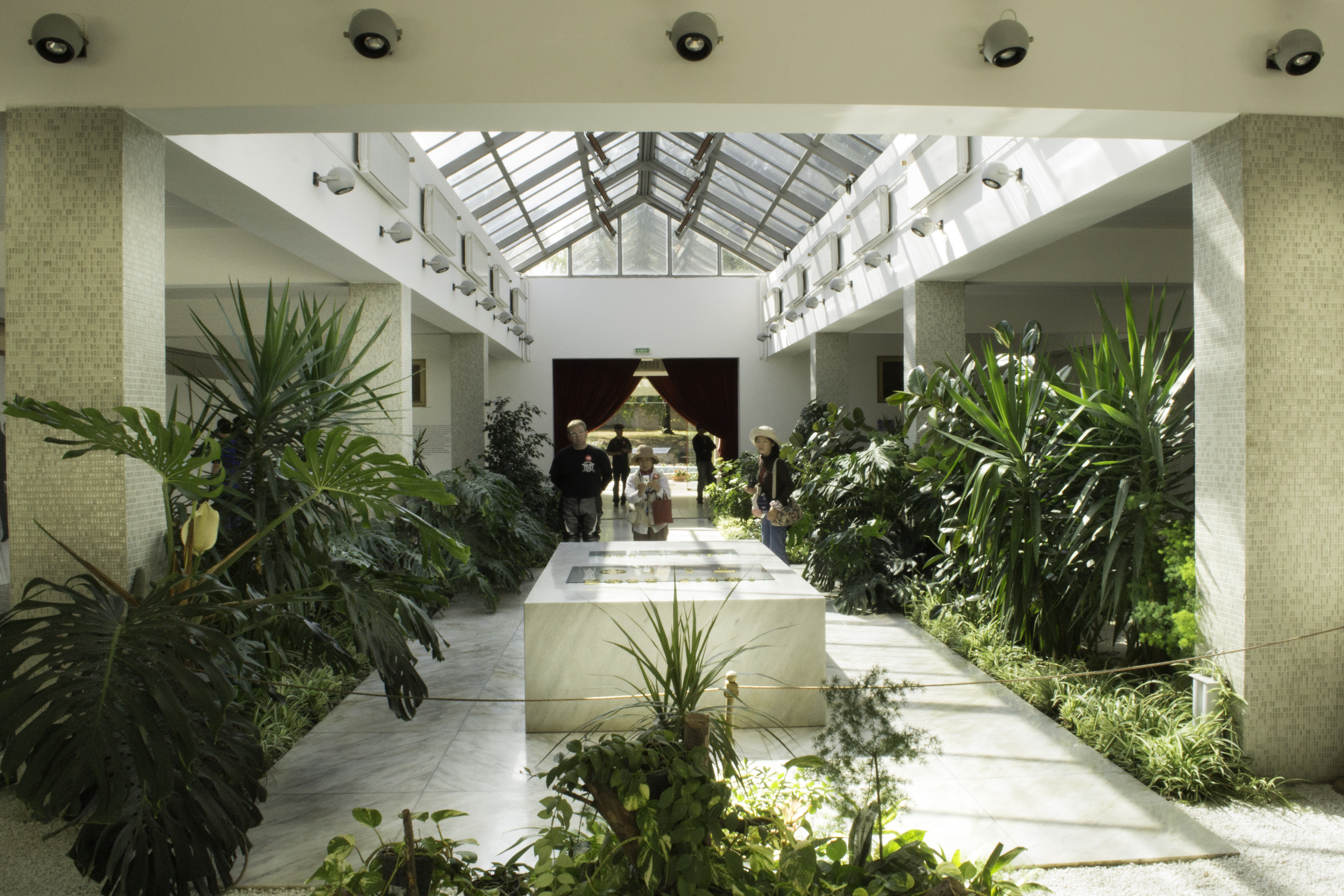
- Interior of the House of Flowers

- Location within Belgrade

General information
- Type: Mausoleum; Museum
- Location: Belgrade, Serbia
- Coordinates: 44°47′12.21″N 20°27′6.1″E
- Completed: 1975

Technical details
- Floor area: 902 m^{2} (9,710 sq ft)

Design and construction
- Architect: Stjepan Kralj

The House of Flowers (Serbian: Кућа цвећа / Kuća cveća; Croatian: Kuća cvijeća; Macedonian: Куќа на цвеќето; Slovene: Hiša cvetja) is the resting place of Josip Broz Tito (1892–1980) and Jovanka Broz (1924–2013), the President and the First Lady of the Socialist Federal Republic of Yugoslavia. It is located on the grounds of the Museum of Yugoslavia in Dedinje, Belgrade, Serbia.

== Name ==
The name of the "House of Flowers" comes from the fact that many flowers surrounded the tomb until it was closed to the public after the breakup of the Socialist Federal Republic of Yugoslavia. Today there are only white rocks where the flowers used to be. It was internally called "flower shop" during Tito's life when it served as his auxiliary office with covered garden.

== History ==
The House of Flowers was built in 1975, on the basis of a project by architect Stjepan Kralj. It was built as a winter garden with spaces for work and rest of Josip Broz with an area of 902 square metres (9,710 sq ft) near the residence where he lived. It consists of three parts: the central one – a flower garden, and two parallel wide corridors on the sides. On the opposite side of the entrance is an uncovered terrace with a view of Belgrade. In the central part, following his personal wish, Tito was buried in May 1980. His third and last wife Jovanka Broz was buried next to him in 2013.

The permanent exhibitions in the House of Flowers consist of local, republic, and federal Relays of Youth from the period after 1957, from when 25 May was celebrated as Youth Day. Besides that, written messages that Tito received with relays, exchanged batons, photographs of people carrying them, tickets and programmes of rallies, and other related material are displayed in the museum.

For almost a decade after the breakup of Yugoslavia the entire complex (the tomb and the memorial museum) was closed to the public and the military guards were permanently removed. However, the site was opened again to tourists and to people who wish to pay their respects. Many guests, from all over the former Yugoslavia, visit the place, especially on 25 May (Tito's official birth date) – Youth Day in the former Yugoslavia. The memorial was reportedly visited by more than eleven thousand people in 2004, and between 1982 and 2012, more than 17 million people.

== Gallery ==
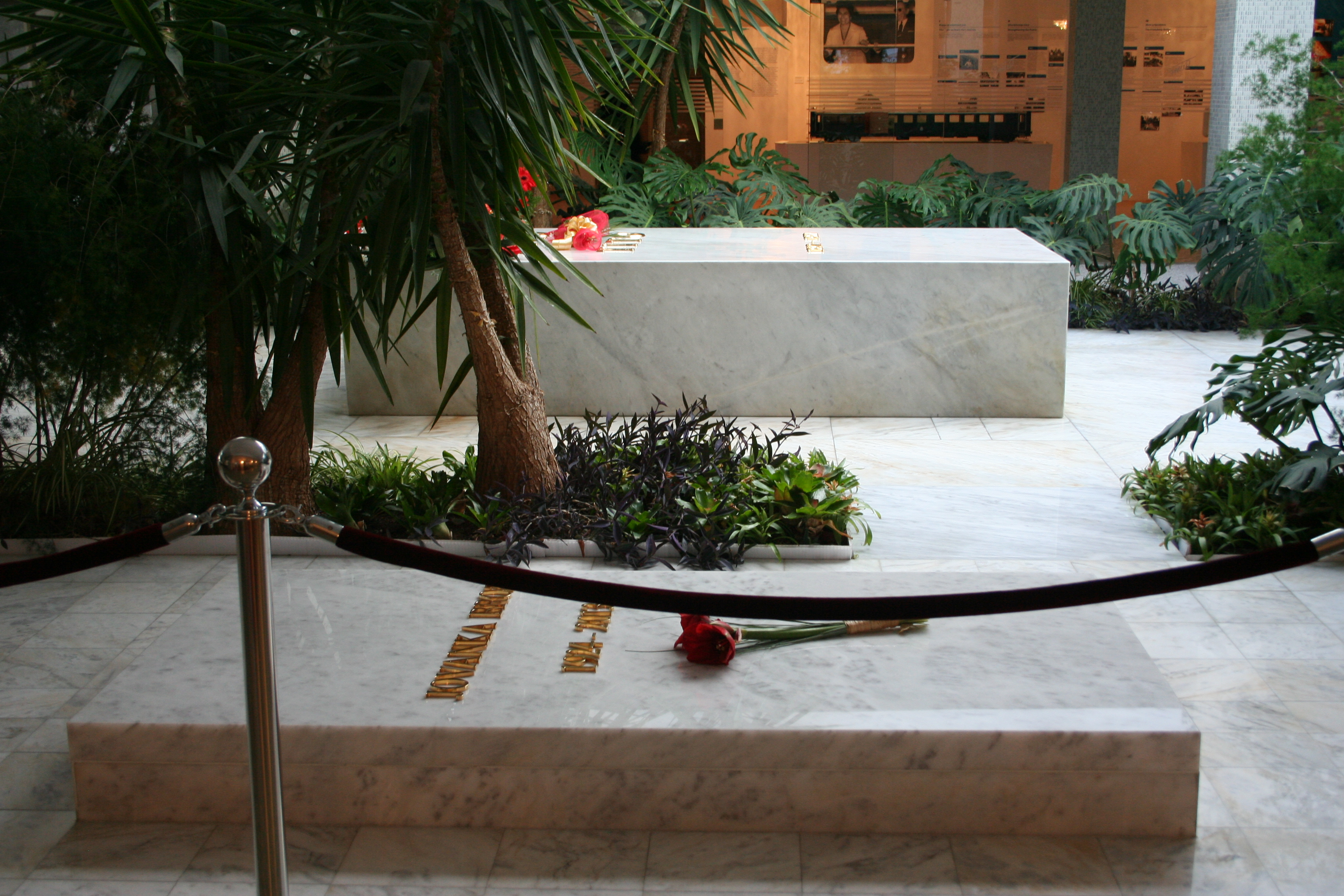
The tombs of Josip Broz Tito and Jovanka Broz side by side

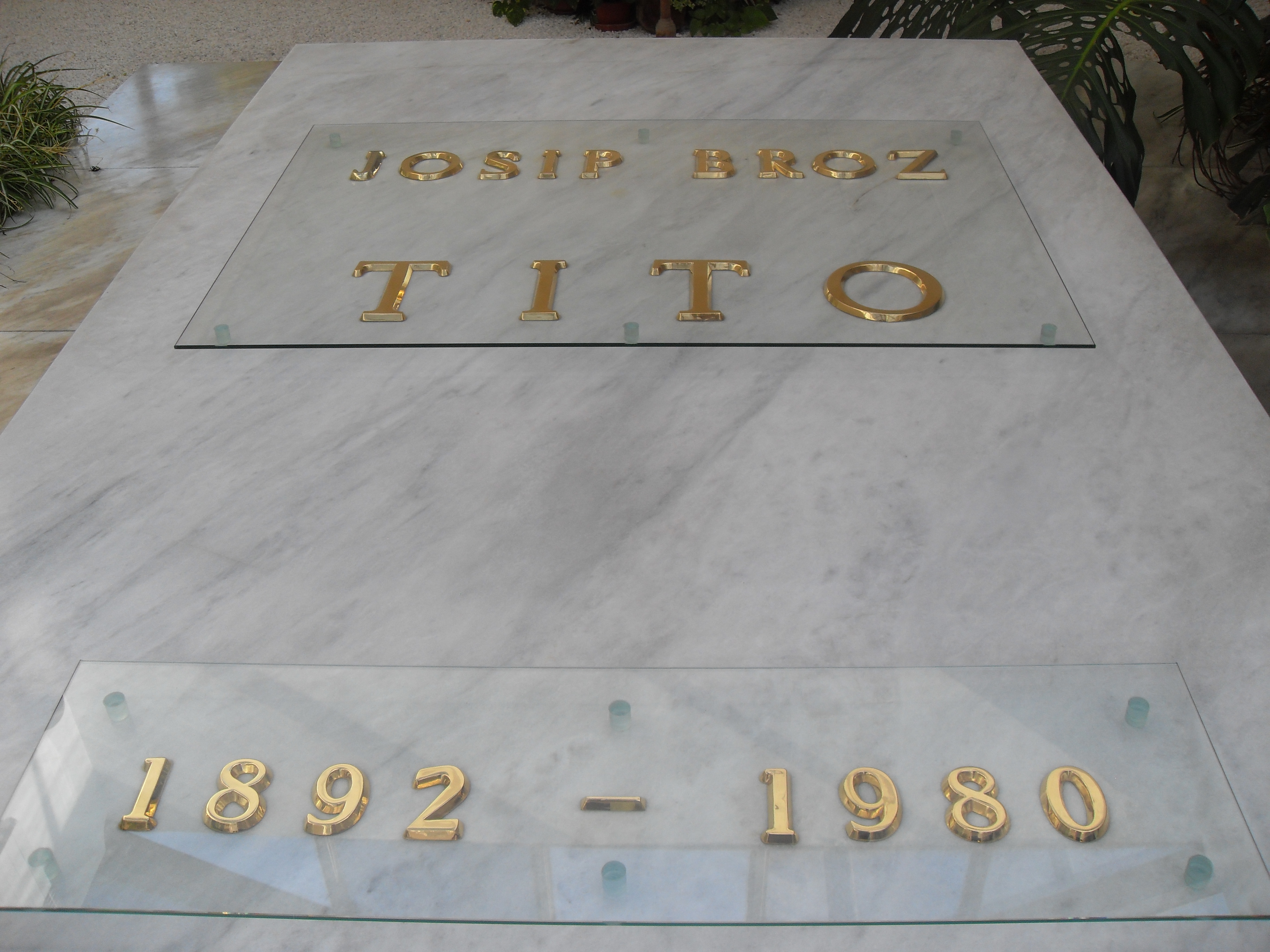
Josip Broz Tito's tomb inside the mausoleum

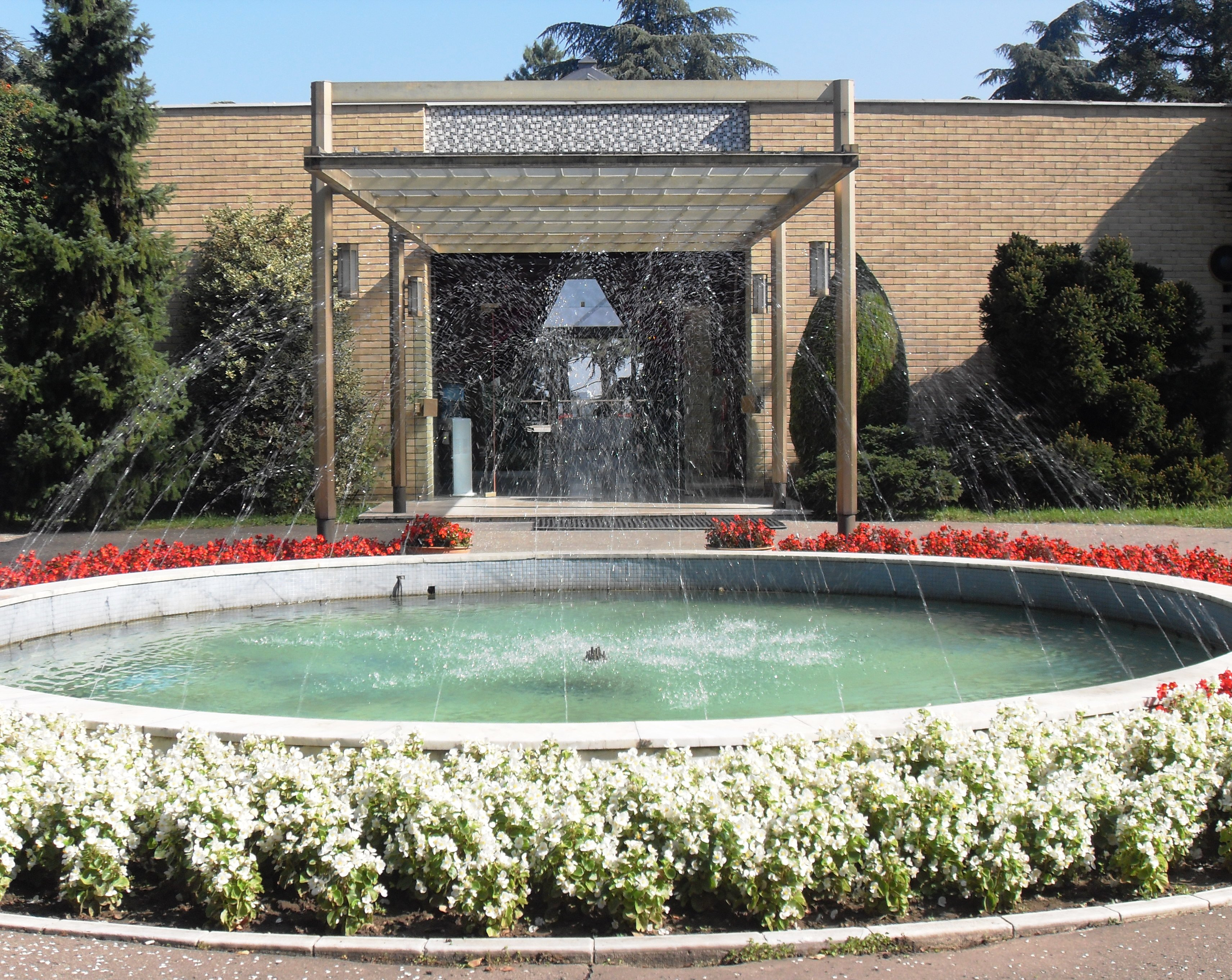
Main entrance to the House of Flowers

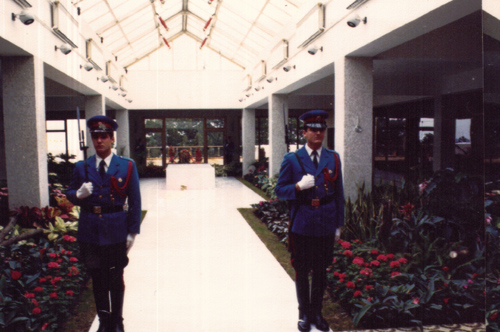
Honor guard of the mausoleum

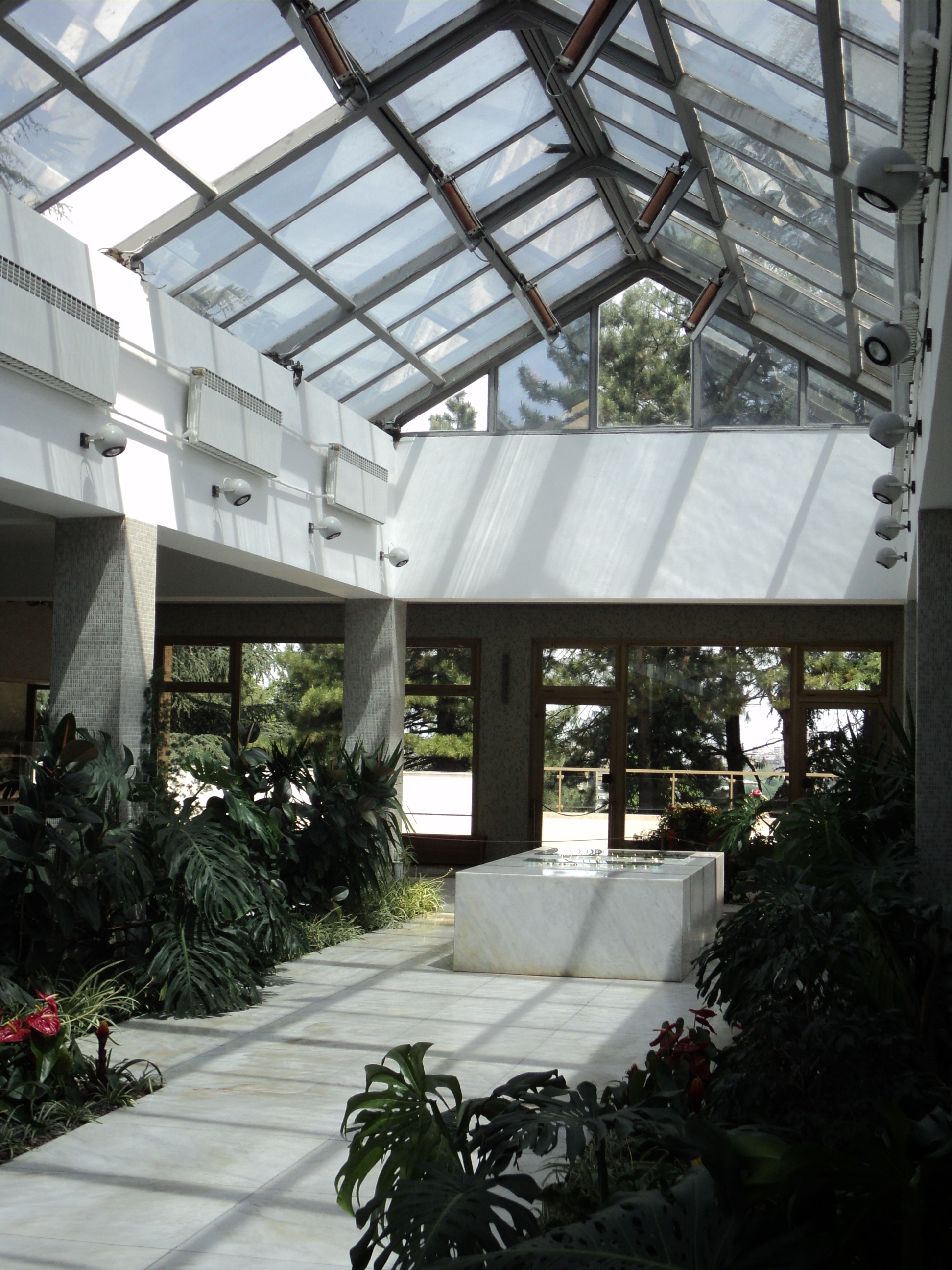
Interior of the House of Flowers

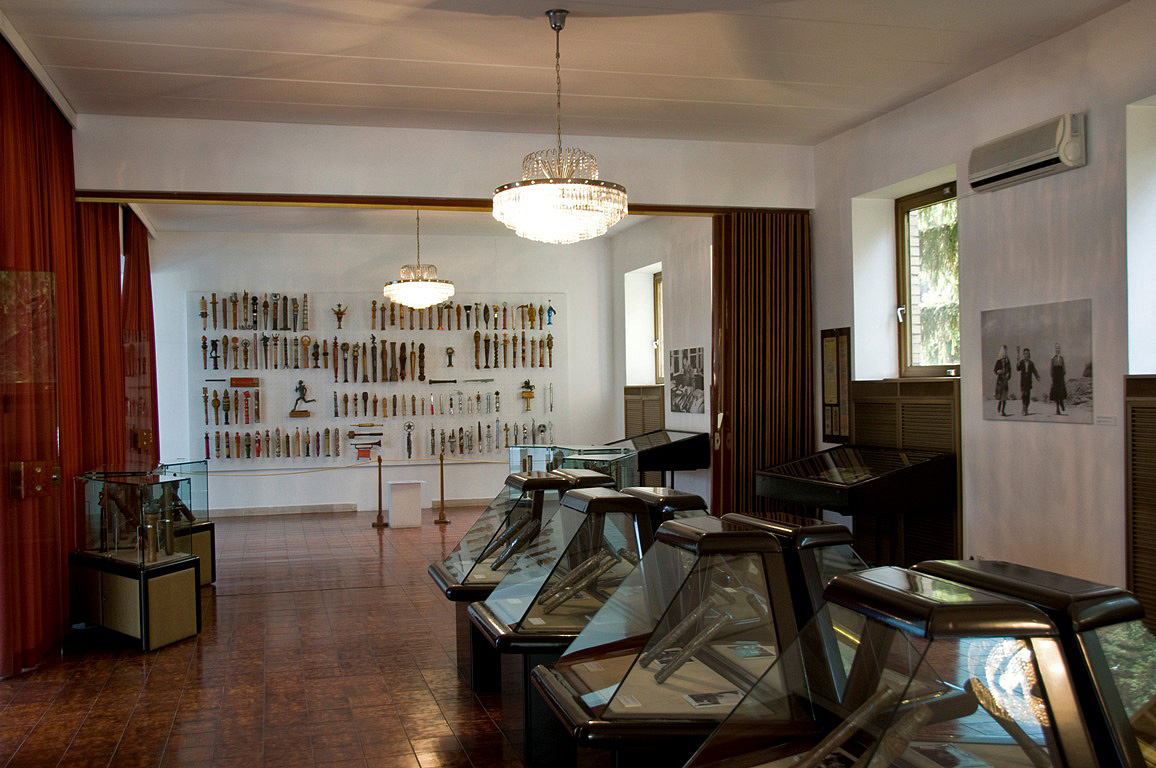
House of Flowers museum, with the Relays of Youth on the wall
