= Museum of Yugoslavia =

- Музеј Југославије
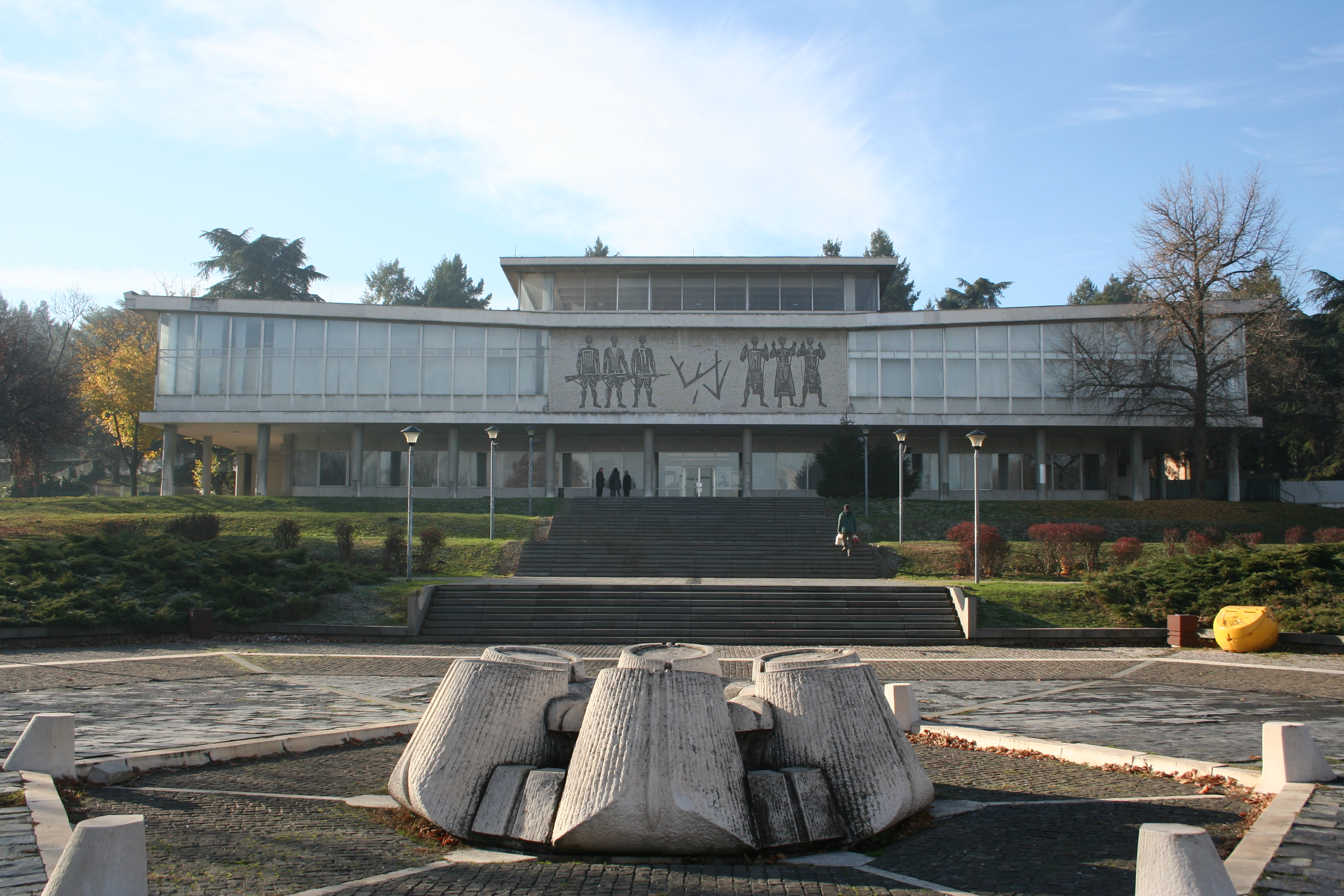
- The 25 May Museum, the largest building of the Museum of Yugoslavia
- Established: 25 May 1962; 64 years ago
- Location: Gospodar Jevremova 19, Belgrade, Serbia
- Coordinates: 44°47′12″N 20°27′06″E
- Type: History museum
- Visitors: 120,000 (2017)

The Museum of Yugoslavia (Serbian: Музеј Југославије, romanized: Muzej Jugoslavije) is a public history museum in Belgrade, Serbia dedicated to the history of Yugoslavia and the life of Josip Broz Tito. Tito and his wife Jovanka are buried on the museum's grounds in the House of Flowers.

With 120,000 visitors annually, it is the most visited museum in Serbia.

== History ==
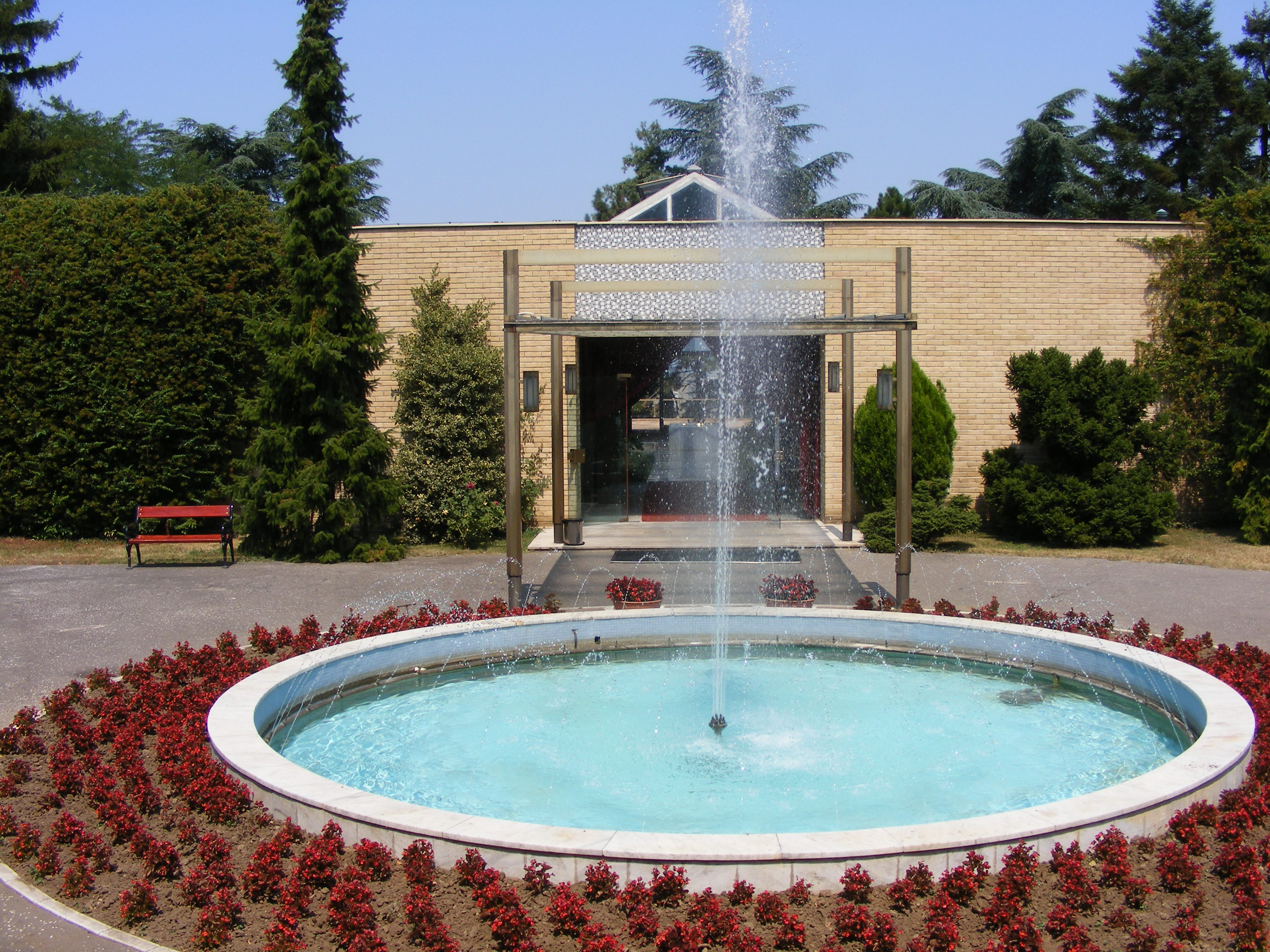
House of Flowers, part of the Museum of Yugoslavia

=== "Josip Broz Tito" Memorial Centre ===
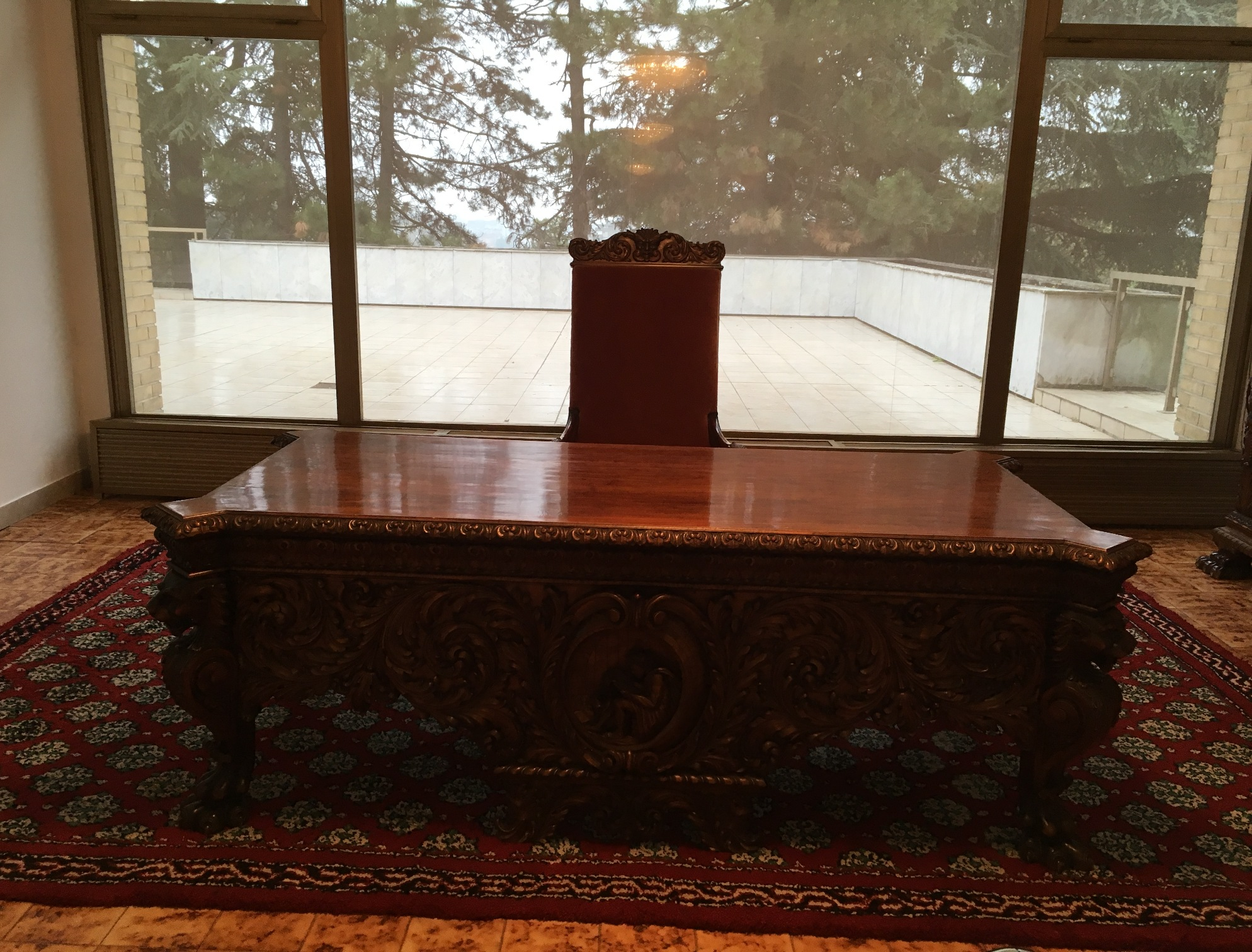
Josip Broz Tito's personal desk on display

All three buildings that make up the Museum of Yugoslavia were previously part of the "Josip Broz Tito" Memorial Centre.

The 25 May Museum was opened on 25 May 1962. It was built by the City of Belgrade as a present to Josip Broz Tito, the president of Yugoslavia, for his 70th birthday. This museum was used to display presents that Tito had received up until 1962. A special collection of Relay of Youth batons were on display in this museum. On 16 November 1982, the "Josip Broz Tito" Memorial Centre was founded and the 25 May Museum became part of the centre. Memorial centre included several buildings and institutions located mainly in Belgrade, but also in other parts of Yugoslavia (Tito's birth house in Kumrovec was part of the centre). The House of Flowers where Tito was buried was also the part of the Memorial Centre. Most buildings that made up the Memorial Centre were located in the same park in the Dedinje district of Belgrade. In 1984, the Memorial Collection Building was opened as the annex of the 25 May Museum building. The Memorial Collection displayed Tito's medals and decorations and his personal belongings.

The Old Museum building was named so after the 25 May Museum (new museum) was opened. It displays museum piece that chronicle the culture, ethnography of Yugoslavia.

After his death on 4 May 1980, Josip Broz Tito was buried in the House of Flowers, set in the Memorial Centre grounds. The centre had a collection of more than 75,000 items that illustrate the history of Yugoslavia throughout the 20th century, with the special accent on the life and work of Tito himself. It also kept an extensive collection of the gifts Tito received during his many visits with foreign dignitaries during his presidency. The exhibits further included works of many world-notable artists like Jan Griffier, Claude Joseph Vernet, Ferdinand Georg Waldmüller, including original prints of Los Caprichos by Francisco Goya, Gerbrand van den Eeckhout Giving the Tenth, and many others.

For almost a decade after the breakup of the Socialist Federal Republic of Yugoslavia, the entire complex (the tomb and the museum) was closed to the public and the military guards were permanently removed. The complex is now again a major tourist attraction. Many people visit the place as a shrine to "better times", especially on 25 May (Josip Broz Tito's official birth date).

=== Museum of the Revolution of Yugoslav Peoples ===
The Museum of the Revolution of Yugoslav Peoples was founded in 1959 by the Central Committee of the League of Communists of Yugoslavia. The construction of the museum building started only in 1978 in New Belgrade between the Palace of Serbia and the Ušće Tower. It was planned to open the building in 1981 at the 40th anniversary of the Revolution, but it was never finished. The unfinished structure stands abandoned and is occupied by several dozen of homeless people.

=== Museum of History of Yugoslavia ===
The museum was founded in 1996 by the Government of the Federal Republic of Yugoslavia as the Museum of the History of Yugoslavia to replace two previous institutions: the "Josip Broz Tito" Memorial Centre and the Museum of the Revolution of Yugoslav Peoples. The newly founded museum contained collections from both the "Josip Broz Tito" Memorial Centre and the Museum of the Revolution of Yugoslav Peoples.

=== Museum of Yugoslavia ===
The museum changed its name in 2016, from Museum of the History of Yugoslavia to Museum of Yugoslavia. The museum complex comprises three buildings with a total surface of 5253 m^{2}, set in a 3.2-hectare park:

- 25 May Museum
- House of Flowers
- Old Museum

== See also ==
- Archives of Yugoslavia
- Yugoslav Film Archive
- Yugoslav Drama Theatre
- List of museums in Serbia
