= Death and state funeral of Josip Broz Tito =

1980 state funeral for the President of Yugoslavia

Funeral of Josip Broz Tito
- Part of the breakup of Yugoslavia
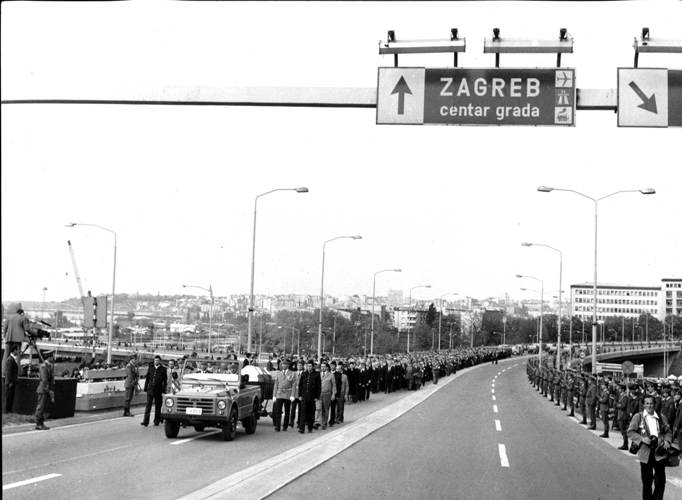
- Tito's funeral procession
- Date: 8 May 1980; 46 years ago
- Location: Dedinje, Belgrade, Serbia, Yugoslavia
- Participants: Yugoslav officials and dignitaries from 128 foreign countries

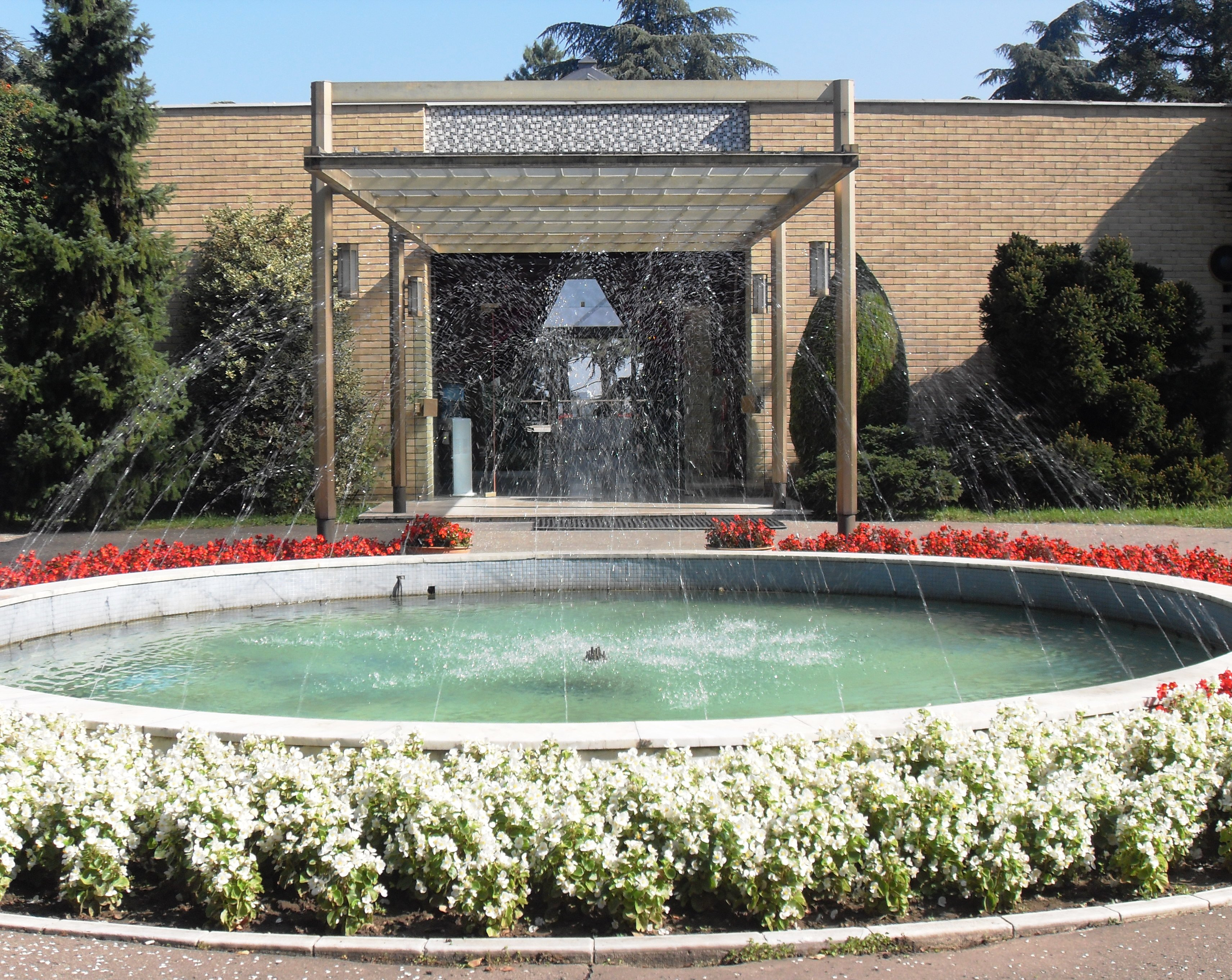
House of Flowers, Tito's mausoleum

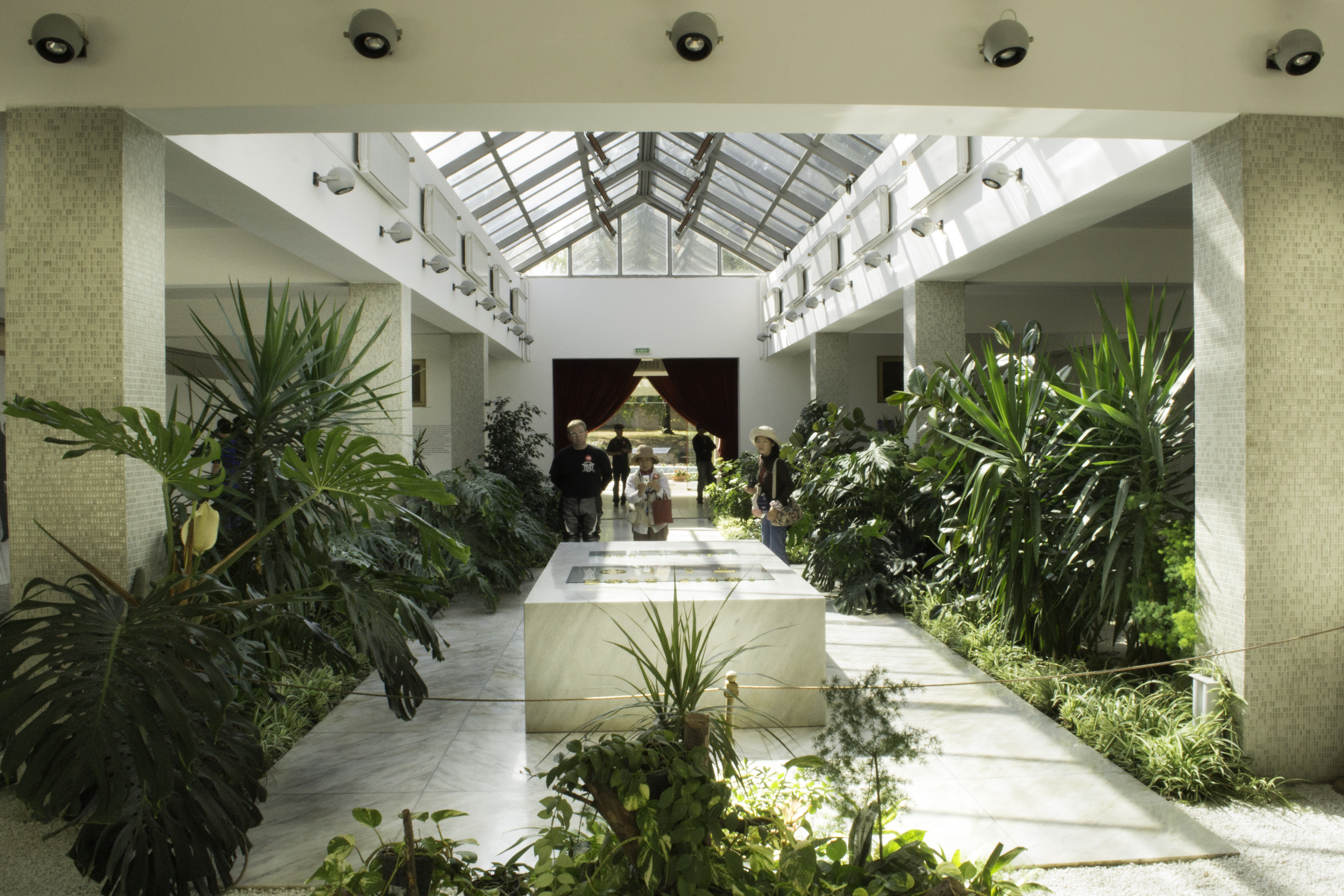
Tito's tomb

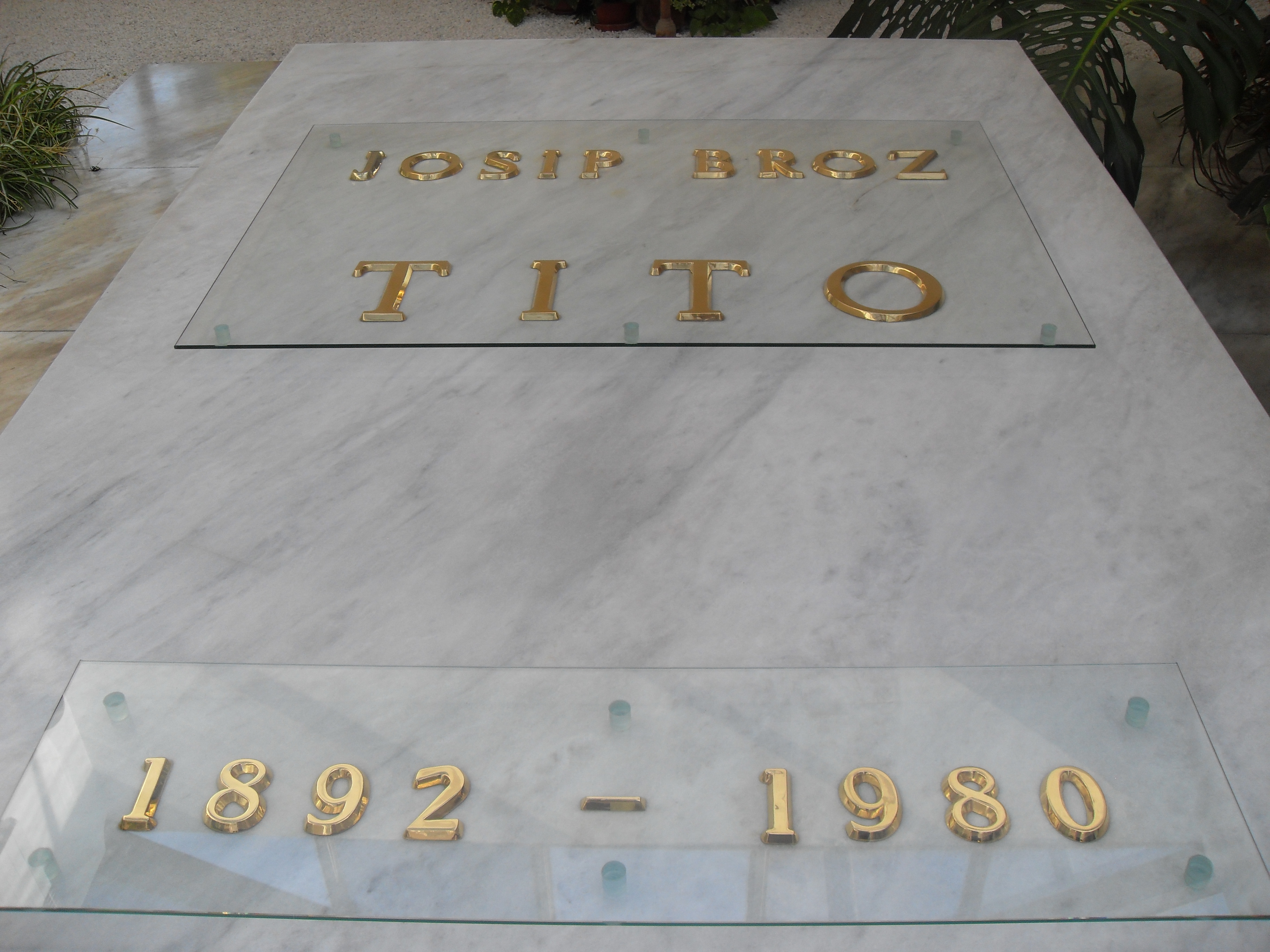
Tito's grave

Josip Broz Tito, President of Yugoslavia and leader of the League of Communists of Yugoslavia, died on 4 May 1980 following a prolonged illness. His state funeral was held four days later on 8 May, drawing a significant number of statesmen from Western, Eastern and Non-Aligned countries across the world. The attendees included four kings, six princes, 22 prime ministers, 31 presidents, and 47 ministers of foreign affairs. In total, 128 countries out of the 154 UN members at the time were represented. Also present were delegates from seven multilateral organizations, six movements and forty political parties.

Tito had become increasingly ill throughout 1979. On 7 January and again on 11 January 1980, Tito was admitted to the University Medical Centre in Ljubljana, the capital city of SR Slovenia, with circulation problems in his legs. His left leg was amputated soon afterwards due to arterial blockages, and he died of gangrene at the Medical Centre Ljubljana on 4 May 1980 at 3:05 pm, three days short of his 88th birthday. The Plavi voz, Tito's personal train, brought his body to Belgrade where it lay in state at the Federal Parliament building until the funeral.

As Tito had been viewed as the central unifying figure of culturally, religiously diverse and throughout times ethnically antagonistic nations of Yugoslavia, his death is considered to be one of key catalysts for the dissolution and destruction of the Yugoslav state a mere decade later.

Tito’s funeral is often seen as one of the largest funerals of all time, estimated at around 1 million people.

== Illness ==
By 1979, Tito's health had declined rapidly, mainly due to an arterial embolism in his left leg. This embolism was a complication of his diabetes, which he had had for many years. In that year, he participated in the Havana Conference of the Non-Aligned Movement and spent New Year's Eve in his residence in Karađorđevo. Throughout the televised event, Tito remained seated while exchanging greetings, causing concern to the watching audience. During this time Vila Srna was built for his use near Morović in the event of his recovery.

The first circulation problems in his left leg begun in the second half of December 1979. Tito refused to undergo any diagnostic procedure prior to the new year celebration. On January 3, 1980, Tito was admitted to the Ljubljana University Medical Centre for tests on blood vessels in his leg. Two days later, after the angiography, he was discharged to his residence in Brdo Castle near Kranj, with a recommendation for further intensive treatment. Angiography revealed that Tito's superficial femoral artery and Achilles tendon artery were clogged. The medical council consisted of eight Yugoslav doctors, Michael DeBakey from the United States and Marat Knyazev from the Soviet Union.

Following the advice of DeBakey and Knyazev, the medical team attempted an arterial bypass. The first surgery was done in the night of January 12. At first, the operation appeared to have been a success, but after few hours, it became clear that the operation was not successful. Due to severe damage to the arteries, which led to the interruption of blood flow and accelerated tissue devitalization of the left leg, Tito's left leg was amputated on January 20, to prevent the spread of gangrene. When Tito was told about the required amputation, he resisted it as long as possible. Finally, after meeting with his sons, Žarko and Mišo, he agreed to the amputation. After the amputation, Tito's health improved and he began rehabilitation. On 28 January, he was transferred from the Department of Cardiovascular Surgery to the Department of Cardiology. In the first days of February his health had improved enough to allow him to perform some of his regular duties.

By the beginning of February 1980, however, it became clear that Tito's life was in grave danger and Yugoslav political leadership secretly began preparations for his funeral. Tito's wish was to be buried in the House of Flowers on Dedinje hill, that overlooks Belgrade. Moma Martinovic, a director for Radio Television Belgrade, was summoned by Dragoljub Stavrev, a vice president in the federal government, to devise plans for broadcasting the funeral.

In late February, Tito's health suddenly took a turn to the worst. He suffered from kidney failure and in March, his heart and lungs began to fail and in late April, he suffered a stroke, whilst he was still in the hospital.

== Death ==
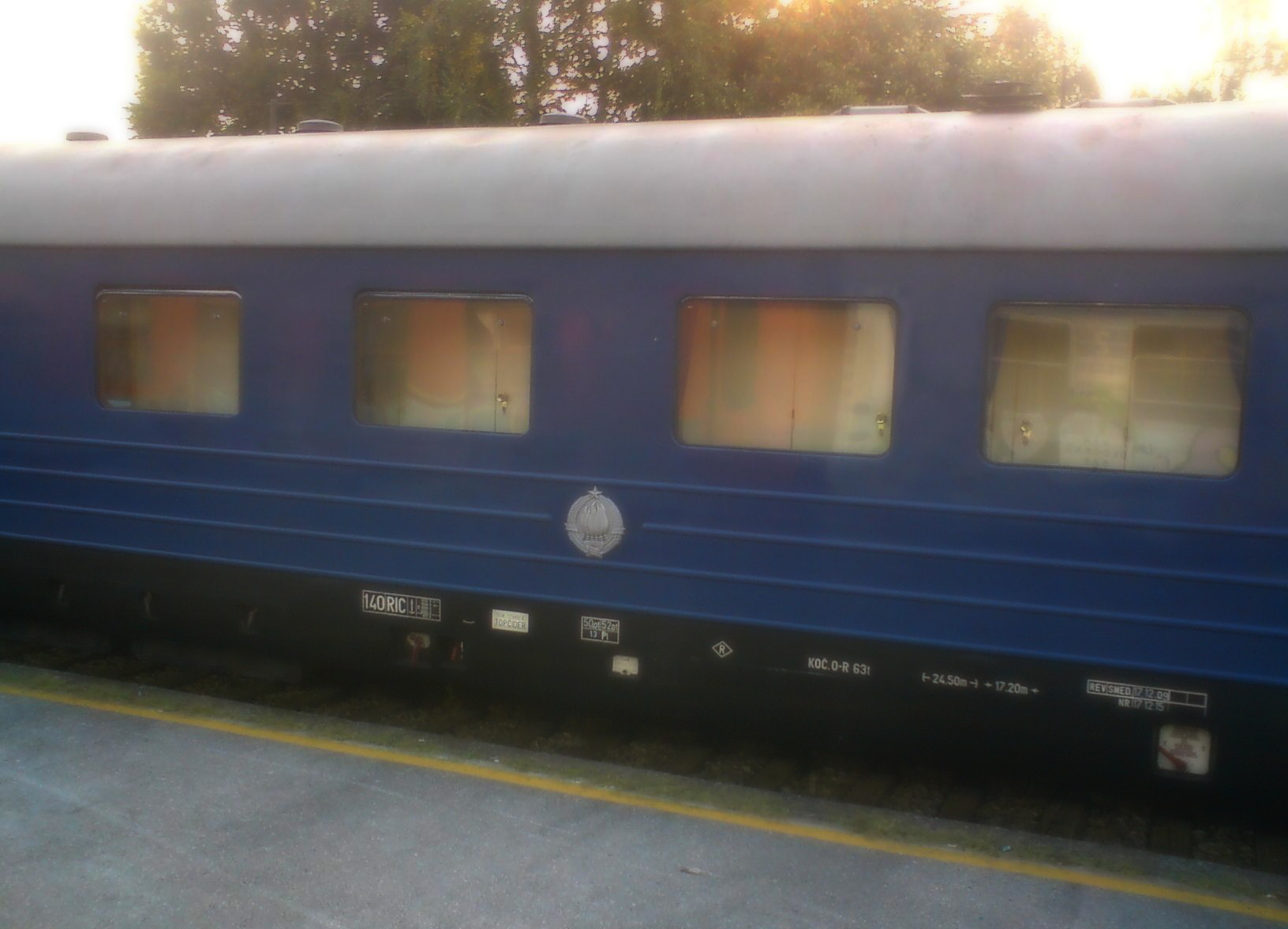
Tito's Blue Train (Plavi voz), the train which carried Tito's coffin from Ljubljana to Belgrade

Josip Broz Tito died in the Department of Cardiovascular Surgery at the University Medical Centre, Ljubljana on 4 May 1980, at 3:05 pm, due to complications of gangrene, three days before his 88th birthday. He died on the seventh floor, in a small room on the southeast corner. A commemorative inscription in the main hall later read "Pot do osvoboditve človeka bo še dolga, a bila bi daljša da ni živel Tito" ("The fight for peoples' liberation will be a long one, but would have been longer if Tito never lived"). That inscription was later removed. Immediately upon learning of Tito's death, a full extraordinary session of both the Presidency of Yugoslavia and the Presidency of the Central Committee of the League of Communists of Yugoslavia was held in Belgrade starting at 6:00 pm, at which Tito's death was formally declared via a joint statement:

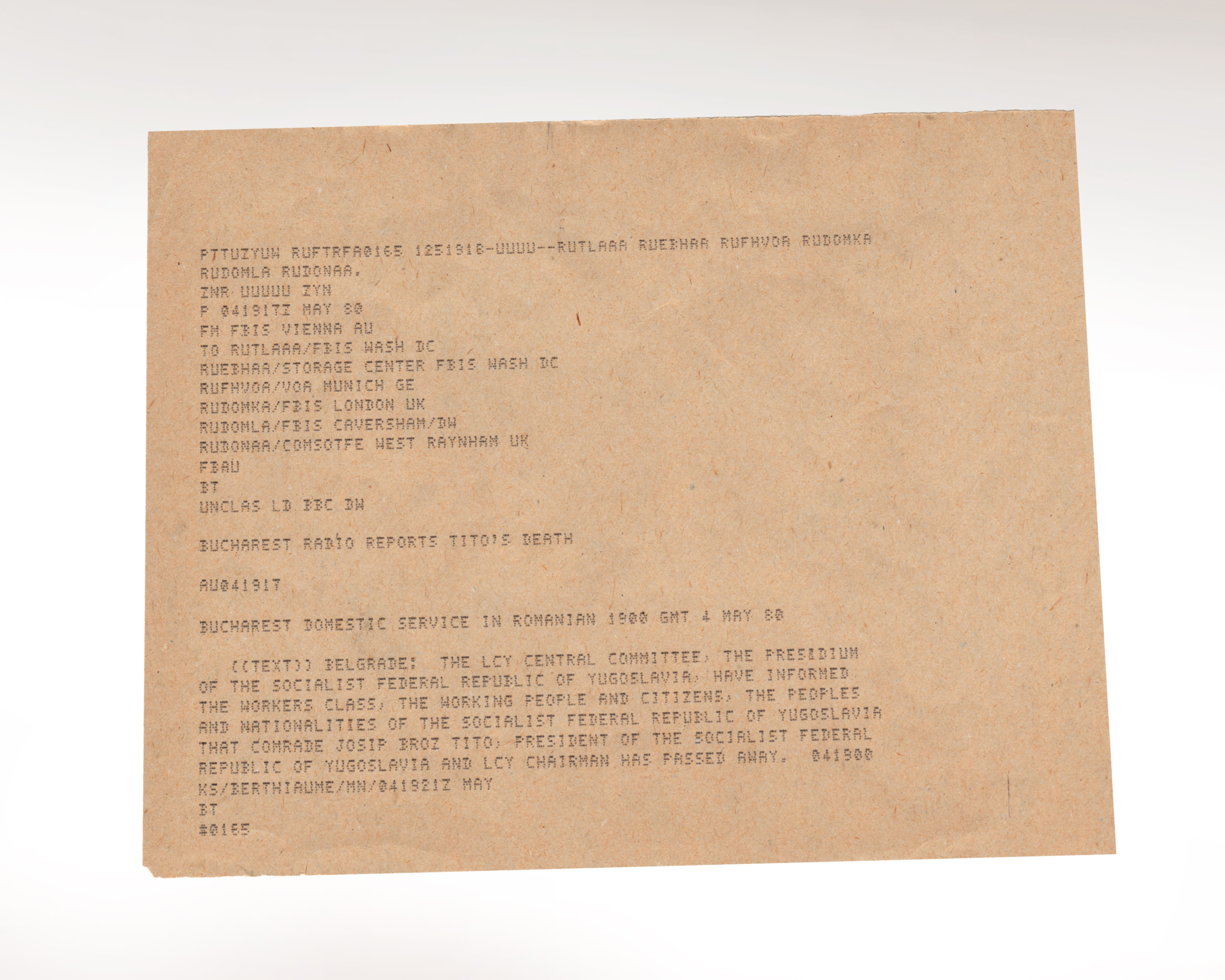
The message from the CIA's FBIS Austria Bureau, regarding the Radio Bucharest announcement of Tito's death, filed on 4 May 1980

To the working class, all the working people and citizens, and all the nations and nationalities of the Socialist Federal Republic of Yugoslavia:

Comrade Tito has died.

On May 4th, 1980, at 15:05 in Ljubljana, the great heart of the President of our Socialist Yugoslavia, the President of the Presidency of Yugoslavia, the President of the League of Communists of Yugoslavia, Marshal of Yugoslavia, and the Commander-in-chief of the Yugoslav armed forces, Josip Broz Tito, has stopped beating.

Great sorrow and pain are shaking up the working class, nations and nationalities of our country, every citizen, worker, soldier, war veteran, farmer, intellectual, every creator, pioneer and youth, and every girl and mother.

Tito is our dearest friend. For his entire life, Tito was a fighter for the interests and goals of the working class, for the most humane ideals and desires of our nations and nationalities. Seven decades he was burning up in a workers' movement. For six decades, he strengthened Yugoslav Communists. For more than four decades, he was the leader of our Party. He was a heroic leader in World War II and the Socialist revolution. For three and a half decades, he led our Socialist country. He moved our country and our fight for fairer human society into world history, proving that way to be our most crucial historic world personality.

During the most fateful times of our survival and development, Tito was bold and worthy of carrying the proletarian flag of our revolution, persistently and consistently linked to the fate of nations and man. He fought throughout his life and work and lived revolutionary humanism and fervour with enthusiasm and love for the country.

Tito was not only a visionary, critic and translator of the world. He reviewed the objective conditions and patterns of social movements, into the great ideas and thoughts into action with the million masses of the people with him at the helm, and made epochal progressive social transformations.

Thus, forever shall his revolutionary work be remembered for all time in the history of the people and nationalities of Yugoslavia and the history of the independence of all of humankind.

—Signed, The Central Committee of the League of Communists of Yugoslavia and the Presidency of Yugoslavia, Belgrade, 4 May 1980.

After the declaration was read, Stevan Doronjski (President of the League of Communists of Yugoslavia) said, "Eternal glory be to the memory of our great leader and father of the revolution, President of Yugoslavia and General Secretary and President of the League, our comrade Josip Broz Tito."

At the same meeting, by the 1974 Yugoslav Constitution, as amended, it was decided that Lazar Koliševski, Vice President of the Presidency of Yugoslavia, would temporarily take the office of the President of the Presidency of Yugoslavia, and that Cvijetin Mijatović, a former member of the Presidency of SR Bosnia and Herzegovina, would take Koliševski's place as state vice president. Following the LCY Statute as amended, former chairman of Presidency of Central Committee of League of Communists of Yugoslavia Stevan Doronjski assumed the post of President of the Presidency of the Central Committee of League of Communists of Yugoslavia. Immediately afterwards, the Federal Executive Council (government of Yugoslavia) decided to announce a week of national mourning across the country formally and cancelled all entertainment, cultural and sporting events. Many countries around the world declared periods of national mourning. North Korea, Egypt, Algeria, Tanzania, and Burma announced seven days of mourning; Pakistan, Cyprus, and Ghana announced four days of mourning; Jordan, India, Iraq, Cuba, Guinea and Zambia announced three days of mourning; Angola announced two days of mourning; and Sri Lanka declared one day of mourning.

== Grief in the nation ==
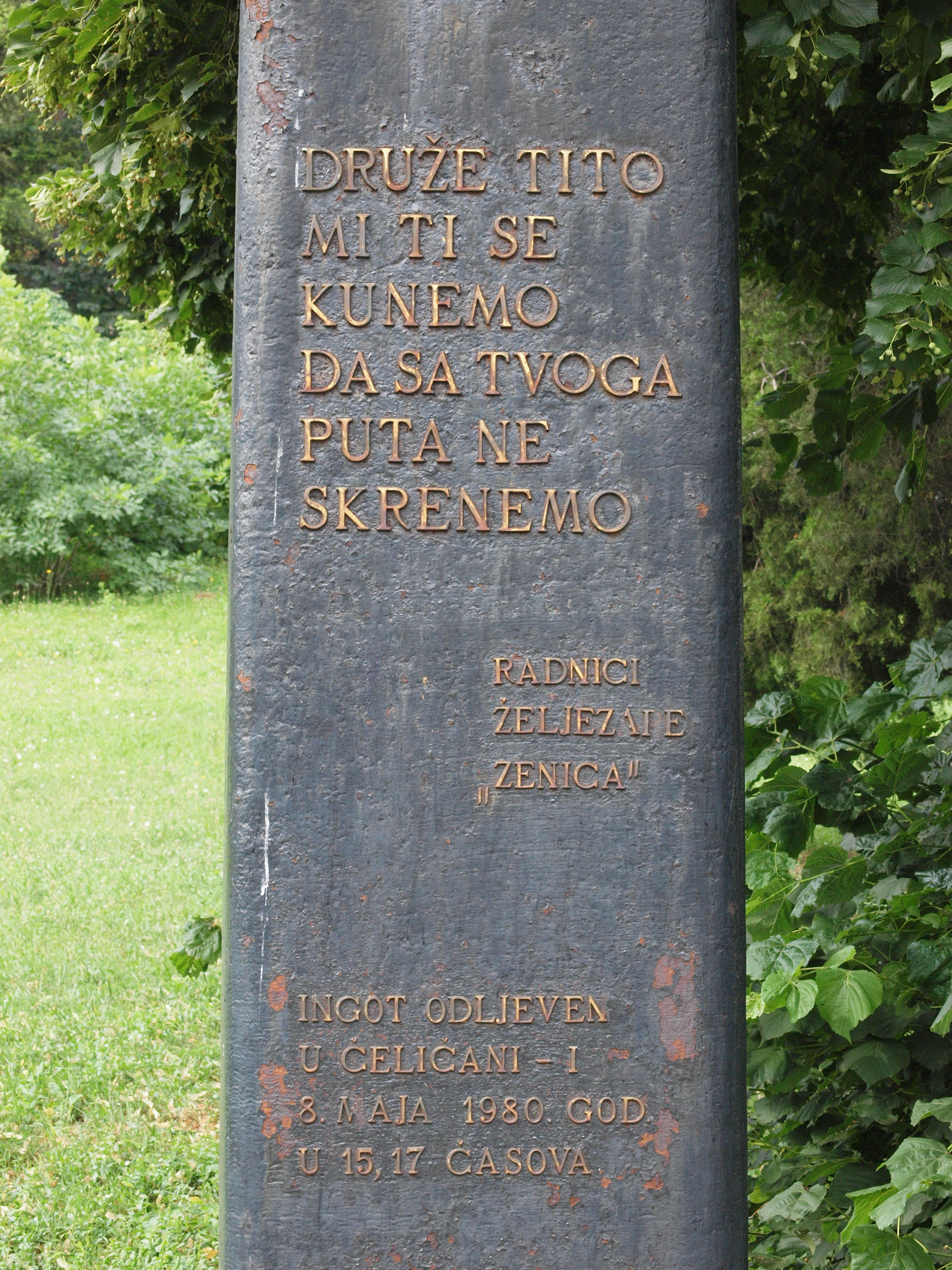
Memorial reading the slogan much repeated in the 1980s; column by Ironworks Zenica, 8 May 1980

Tito's death was sudden and unexpected for Yugoslavian citizens who were minding their usual weekend activities. Television broadcasters had their normal programming interrupted with a black screen for thirty seconds, before Miodrag Zdravković, newsreader of Radio Television Belgrade, read the following announcement live:

Comrade Tito has died. That was announced tonight by the Central Committee of the League of Communists of Yugoslavia and the Presidency of Yugoslavia to the working class, all the working people and citizens and all the nations and nationalities of the Socialist Federal Republic of Yugoslavia.

The same announcement was read out on the television stations of each constituent republic in their respective languages.

On Sunday afternoons, Yugoslav Television often broadcast association football games of the Yugoslav First League. That day, there was a league match in Split between NK Hajduk Split and FK Crvena Zvezda. When the match was in its 41st minute, three men entered the Poljud Stadium pitch, signaling the referee to stop the match. Ante Skataretiko, the president of Hajduk, took the microphone and announced Tito's death. The announcement was followed by scenes of mass crying with some players such as Zlatko Vujović collapsing down to the ground and weeping. Players of both teams and referees aligned to stand for a moment of silence. Once the stadium announcer said "May he rest in peace", the entire stadium of 50,000 football fans spontaneously started to sing Comrade Tito we swear to you, from your path we will never depart (Druže Tito mi ti se kunemo, da sa tvoga puta ne skrenemo). Two other games were also abandoned due to Tito's death: Sarajevo vs. Osijek and Dinamo Zagreb vs. Željezničar. All three games were replayed on 21 May.

Grief for the statesman's death was largely based on his place in the Yugoslav political scene. He had led the resistance movement against Axis occupation in the Second World War, helped create a socialist federation principled on 'brotherhood and unity' of Yugoslav nations, stood for self-determination and political independence of post-war Yugoslavia from both Western and Eastern Bloc, co-initiated the Non-Aligned Movement at the time of peak tensions of possible nuclear warfare between the blocs; all of which contributed to his general popularity in the country and abroad.

== State funeral ==
Nations that sent state delegations Nations that did not send state delegations, but organizations from those nations did Nations that did not send state delegations

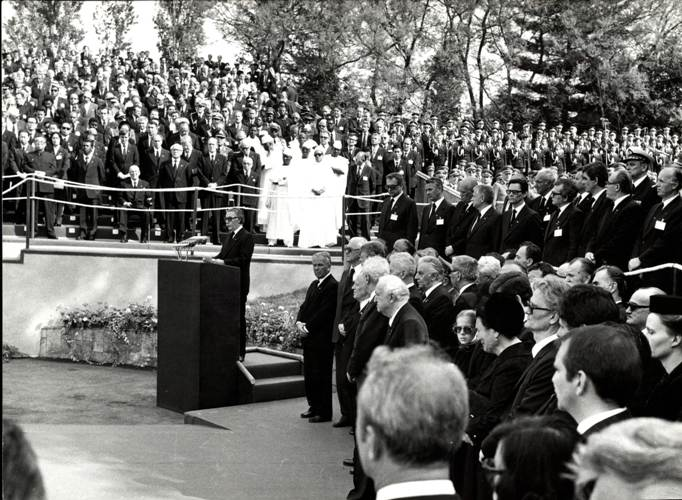
State funeral of Josip Broz Tito

Tito's blue train brought a coffin with the remains to the capital Belgrade, disproving the rumors of an empty casket along with his body transferred to Belgrade by a military helicopter.

Tito was interred twice on 8 May. The first interment was intended for cameras and dignitaries. The grave was shallow with only a 200 kg (440 lb) replica of the sarcophagus. The second interment was held privately during the night. His coffin was removed, and the shallow grave was deepened. The coffin was enclosed with a copper mask and interred again into a much deeper grave which was sealed with cement and topped with a 9-ton sarcophagus. Communist officials were afraid that someone might steal the corpse, as had happened to Charlie Chaplin. However, the nine-ton sarcophagus had to be put in place with a crane, which would make the funeral unattractive.

In stark contrast to the pageantry of the funeral, Tito's tomb was constructed of marble with a simple inscription that states JOSIP BROZ TITO 1892–1980. It did not incorporate a red star or any emblem linked to communism. Historians stated that the burial location, which was the garden of the place he lived during the post-war years, more popularly known as the House of Flowers, was selected according to Tito's wishes. The House of Flowers, together with the Museum of Yugoslavia, has since become a tourist destination and landmark of Belgrade visited by millions of people.

The pomp and scale of the funeral had been widely documented and the event was a source of pride for the country for years to come. On the fifteenth anniversary of his death in 1995, the Croatian newspaper Arkzin noted that "turbulent times still do not allow for a truly historical assessment of his stature and achievements, but the appraisal which the world showed those days in May 1980, confirms that small nations and small states may produce world giants."

== Foreign dignitaries ==
Tito's funeral drew many statesmen to Belgrade. Two notably absent statesmen were President of the United States Jimmy Carter and First Secretary of the Communist Party of Cuba Fidel Castro. His death came just as the 1979 Soviet invasion of Afghanistan had ended the American-Soviet détente. Yugoslavia, though a communist state, was non-aligned during the Cold War due to the Tito-Stalin split in 1948.

After learning that Chinese Communist Party chairman Hua Guofeng would lead the Chinese delegation, the ailing Soviet general secretary Leonid Brezhnev decided to lead his nation's delegation. In order to avoid meeting Brezhnev whilst in the middle of his campaign for the 1980 United States presidential election, Carter opted to send his mother Lilian Carter and Vice President Walter Mondale as heads of the US delegation. After realizing that leaders of all Warsaw Pact nations would attend the funeral, Carter's decision was criticized by presidential candidate George H. W. Bush as a sign that the United States "inferentially slams Yugoslavs at time that country has pulled away from Soviet Union". Carter visited Yugoslavia later in June 1980 and made a visit to Tito's grave.

Helmut Schmidt, chancellor of West Germany, was highly active at the funeral, meeting with Brezhnev, East Germany's Erich Honecker, and Poland's Edward Gierek. British prime minister Margaret Thatcher sought to rally world leaders in order to harshly condemn the Soviet invasion. While she was in Belgrade, she held talks with Kenneth Kaunda, Schmidt, Francesco Cossiga, and Nicolae Ceaușescu. Brezhnev met with Kim Il Sung and Honecker. James Callaghan, leader of the British Labour Party, explained his presence in Belgrade as an attempt to warm relations between his party and Yugoslav communists, which was severed more than a decade ago after dissident Milovan Đilas was welcomed by Jennie Lee, Minister for the Arts under Harold Wilson. Mondale avoided the Soviets, ignoring Brezhnev while passing close to him. Soviet and Chinese delegations also avoided each other.

During the funeral, Yasser Arafat tapped on the shoulder of Margaret Thatcher, after which she swung and shook his hand. Thatcher later stated that she could never forgive herself for shaking his hand.

=== List of delegations ===
Source: Mirosavljev, Radoslav (1981). Titova poslednja bitka (Tito's Last Battle) (in Serbo-Croatian). Beograd: Narodna knjiga. pp. 262–264.

==== Sovereign states ====
===== Heads of state =====
The following delegations were led by their respective heads of state:

- Algeria: Chadli Bendjedid (President), Mohammed Seddik Benyahia (Minister of Foreign Affairs)
- Austria: Rudolf Kirchschläger (President), Bruno Kreisky (Federal Chancellor), Willibald Pahr (Foreign Minister)
- Bangladesh: Ziaur Rahman (President), Muhammad Shamsul Haque (Minister of Foreign Affairs)
- Belgium: King Baudouin, Wilfried Martens (Prime Minister), Henri Simonet (Minister of Foreign Affairs)
- Bulgaria: Todor Zhivkov (Chairman of the State Council)
- Canada: Edward Schreyer (Governor General), Jean Marchand (Speaker of the Senate)
- Czechoslovakia: Gustáv Husák (President), Miloš Jakeš (First Secretary of the Communist Party), Bohuslav Chňoupek (Ministers of Foreign Affairs)
- Ethiopia: Mengistu Haile Mariam (Chairman of the Derg)
- Finland: Urho Kekkonen (President), Paavo Väyrynen (Minister of Foreign Affairs)
- Greece: Konstantinos Tsatsos (President), Agamemnon Gratzios (Chief of the National Defence General Staff)
- Guinea: Ahmed Sékou Touré (President), Moussa Diakité (Foreign minister)
- Guinea-Bissau: Luís Cabral (President), Constantino Teixeira (Commissar of Internal Affairs)
- Hungary: János Kádár (General Secretary of the Hungarian Socialist Workers' Party)
- Iraq: Saddam Hussein (President), Sa'dun Hammadi (Foreign Minister)
- Ireland: Patrick Hillery (President), George Colley (Tánaiste)
- Italy: Sandro Pertini (President), Francesco Cossiga (Prime Minister), Oddo Biasini (Minister of Culture)
- Jordan: King Hussein, Abdelhamid Sharaf (Prime Minister)
- Cyprus: Spyros Kyprianou (President), Nicos A. Rolandis (Foreign Minister)
- North Korea: Kim Il Sung (General Secretary of the Workers' Party of Korea and President), Ho Dam (Foreign Minister), O Jin-u (Minister of Defence)
- Democratic Kampuchea: Khieu Samphan (President of the State Presidium and Prime Minister), Teng Sang (Vice President)
  - Note: This delegation represented the UN-recognized government of Cambodia (Democratic Kampuchea), although in 1980 Cambodia was de facto ruled as the People's Republic of Kampuchea.
- Luxembourg: Jean (Grand Duke), Gaston Thorn (Foreign Minister and Deputy Prime Minister)
- Mali: Moussa Traoré (President), Alioune Blondin Béye (Foreign Minister)
- Malta: Anton Buttigieg (President)
- East Germany: Erich Honecker (General Secretary of the Central Committee and the Chairman of the State Council), Oskar Fischer (Minister of Foreign Affairs), Manfred Flegel (Deputy Chairmen of the Council of Ministers)
- West Germany: Karl Carstens (President), Helmut Schmidt (Chancellor), Hans-Dietrich Genscher (Foreign Minister)
- Norway: King Olav V, Odvar Nordli (Prime Minister)
- Pakistan: Muhammad Zia-ul-Haq (President), Riaz Piracha (Foreign Secretary)
- Panama: Arístides Royo (President), Carlos Osores (Foreign Minister)
- Poland: Edward Gierek (First Secretary of the Polish United Workers' Party), Wojciech Jaruzelski (Minister of National Defence)
- Portugal: António Ramalho Eanes (President), Francisco de Sá Carneiro (Prime Minister)
- Romania: Nicolae Ceaușescu (President), Ilie Verdeț (Prime Minister), Ștefan Andrei (Minister of Foreign Affairs)
- San Marino: Pietro Chiaruzzi and Primo Marani (Captains Regent)
- Soviet Union: Leonid Brezhnev (General Secretary of the Central Committee of the Communist Party, Chairman of the Presidium of the Supreme Soviet), Andrei Gromyko (Ministry of Foreign Affairs)
- Sweden: King Carl XVI Gustaf, Ola Ullsten (Minister for Foreign Affairs)
- Ba'athist Syria: Hafez al-Assad (President), Abdul Halim Khaddam (Minister of Foreign Affairs and Deputy Prime Minister)
- Tanzania: Julius Nyerere (President), Benjamin Mkapa (Minister of Foreign Affairs)
- Togo: Gnassingbé Eyadéma (President)
- Zambia: Kenneth Kaunda (President), Wilson M. Chakulya (Minister of Foreign Affairs)

===== Deputy heads of state =====
The following delegations were headed by deputies to heads of state (including vice presidents) or representatives of monarchs:

- Cuba: Carlos Rafael Rodríguez (Vice President of the Council of State), Isidoro Malmierca Peoli (Foreign Minister)
- Denmark: Henrik (Prince Consort), Kjeld Olesen (Foreign Minister)
- Egypt: Hosni Mubarak (Vice President)
- Ghana: Joseph W.S. deGraft-Johnson (Vice-President), Isaac Chinebuah (Minister for Foreign Affairs), William Ofori Atta (Government Minister)
- Indonesia: Adam Malik (Vice President)
- Madagascar: Charles Ravoajanakhari (Vice President of the Supreme Revolutionary Council)
- Netherlands: Prince Claus (Prince consort), Prince Bernhard (former Prince consort), Dries van Agt (Prime Minister), Chris van der Klaauw (Minister of Foreign Affairs)
- United Kingdom: Prince Philip (Consort of the Queen), Margaret Thatcher (Prime Minister), Lord Carrington (Foreign Secretary), Fitzroy Maclean (wartime British liaison to Yugoslav Partisans, personal friend of Tito)
- United States: Walter Mondale (Vice President), Lillian Gordy Carter (mother of President Jimmy Carter) and W. Averell Harriman (former Governor of New York)
- Yemen Arab Republic: Qadi Abdel (Vice President)

===== Heads of government =====
The following delegations were headed by heads of government:

- Burma: Maung Maung Kha (Prime Minister)
- Cape Verde: Pedro Pires (Prime Minister)
- China: Hua Guofeng (Chairman of the Chinese Communist Party and Premier of China), Ji Pengfei (Secretary General of the State Council)
- France: Raymond Barre (Prime Minister), Jean François-Poncet (Minister of Foreign Affairs)
- India: Indira Gandhi (Prime Minister)
- Japan: Masayoshi Ōhira (Prime Minister), Yasure Katoi (Deputy Minister of Foreign Affairs)
- Mongolia: Jambyn Batmönkh (Prime Minister)
- Peru: Pedro Richter Prada (Prime Minister)
- Spain: Adolfo Suárez (Prime Minister), Marcelino Oreja (Minister of Foreign Affairs)
- Turkey: Süleyman Demirel (Prime Minister), Hayrettin Erkmen (Foreign Minister)
- Zimbabwe: Robert Mugabe (Prime Minister)

===== Deputy heads of government and foreign ministers =====
The following delegations were headed by deputy heads of government or their foreign ministers:

- Afghanistan: Sultan Ali Keshtmand (First Deputy Chairman of the Council of Ministers), Shah Mohamad Dost (Foreign Minister)
- Australia: Andrew Peacock (Minister for Foreign Affairs)
- Bolivia: Gaston Aroas Levi (Foreign Minister)
- Brazil: José Ferraz de Rosa (Army General, State Minister, and General Chief of Staff), Otto Agripino Maia (Foreign Minister)
- Cameroon: Jean Keutcha (Foreign Minister)
- Guyana: Ptolemy Reid (Deputy Prime Minister)
- Iran: Sadegh Ghotbzadeh (Minister of Foreign Affairs)
- Mauritius: Harold Edward Water (Foreign Minister)
- Mexico: Enrique Olivares Santana (Secretary of the Interior), Luis M. Farías (President of the Chamber of Deputies)
- Nepal: Prince Gyanendra of Nepal and K. B. Shahi (Minister of Foreign Affairs)
- Nigeria: Ishaya Audu (Minister of Foreign Affairs), Joseph Wayas (President of the Senate)
- Nicaragua: Miguel d'Escoto Brockmann (Foreign Minister)
- New Zealand: Brian Talboys (Deputy Prime Minister and Minister of Foreign Affairs)
- Seychelles: Jacques Hodoul (Minister for Foreign Affairs)
- Sri Lanka: Abdul Cader Shahul Hameed (Minister of External Affairs)
- Switzerland: Pierre Aubert (Foreign Minister)
- Thailand: Thanat Khoman (Deputy Prime Minister)
- Uganda: Otema Allimadi (Foreign Minister)
- Venezuela: José Zambrano Velasco (Minister of Foreign Affairs)
- Vietnam: Huỳnh Tấn Phát (Deputy Prime Minister)

===== Other state delegations =====
State delegations of those countries were headed by government ministers, ambassadors or royal house members:

- Albania: Sokrat Plaka (ambassador to Yugoslavia)
- Angola: Ambrósio Lukoki (Minister of Education and Member of the Politburo of MPLA), Afonso Van-Dunem (Member of the Central Committee of MPLA)
- Argentina: Alberto Rodríguez Varela (Minister of Justice)
- Benin: Tonakpon Capo-Chichi (Minister of Culture) and Agbahe Gregoire (Minister of Tourism and Crafts)
- Botswana: A. V. Kgarebe (High Commissioner to the United Kingdom)
- Burundi: Reni Nkonkengurute (Member of the Politburo and Presidium of the Central Committee of the Union for National Progress, Minister for Presidency affairs)
- Central African Republic: General Mbale (Minister of Internal Affairs)
- Colombia: Gustavo Balcázar Monzón (Colombia Ambassador to the United Kingdom)
- (Republic of the Congo) Congo: Jean Ganga Zansou (President of the National Assembly)
- Costa Rica: Fernando Aldman (Minister of Economy)
- Ecuador: Mario Aleman (Sub-secretary of the Ministry of Foreign Affairs)
- Equatorial Guinea: Abaga Julian Esono (Ambassador to France)
- Gabon: Jean Robert Fungu (Ambassador to Yugoslavia)
- Iceland: Ingvi Sigurður Ingvarsson (Ambassador to Sweden, non-resident Ambassador to Yugoslavia)
- Ivory Coast: K. Nalobamba (State Minister), Tousagnon Benoit (vice-president of the National Assembly)
- Jamaica: K. G. Hill (Ambassador to Geneva, non-resident Ambassador to Yugoslavia)
- Kenya: J. H. Okvanyo (Trade minister)
- Kuwait: Sheikh Abdullah al Jaber (Special emissary of Emir Jaber al Ahmad)
- Lebanon: Ali el Khalil (Minister of Finance)
- Liberia: Robert Kvele Kennedy (Ambassador to Rome, non-resident Ambassador to Yugoslavia)
- Libya: Abu-Bakr Yunis Jabr (Minister of Defence, General of Army)
- Liechtenstein: Walter Oehry (Government Minister)
- Maldives: Ahmed Zaki (Permanent Representatives to the UN)
- Malaysia: Abdul Taib Mahmud (Minister of Defence)
- Mauritania: Mohamme Ulg el-Hussein (Minister)
- Morocco: Dej Ould Sidi (President of Parliament), Mohammed Doniri (Minister of Supplies)
- Mozambique: Marcelino dos Santos (Member of the Central Committee of FRELIMO, member of the Parliament Standing Committee)
- Niger: Mahamane Karmou (Ambassador to USSR, non-resident Ambassador to Yugoslavia)
- Oman: Fahad bin Mahmoud Al-Said (Under-secretary of judicial affairs)
- Philippines: Leon Ma. Guerrero (Ambassador to Yugoslavia)
- Rwanda: Jules Kanadra (Ambassador to Moscow, non-resident Ambassador to Yugoslavia)
- São Tomé and Príncipe: Brata da Coste (Member of the Coordinating council of the MLSTP/PSD, Minister for Planning)
- Senegal: Maggat Lo (President of the Economic-social committee of the Parliament), Mohammed Li (Government Minister)
- Sierra Leone: Philip Faboe (Secretary of State)
- Singapore: David Marshall (Ambassador to France)
- Somalia: Ismail Ali Abokor (President of the People's Assembly, and Member of the Politburo of the Central Committee of the Somali Revolutionary Socialist Party)
- South Yemen: M. S. Muti (Member of the Politburo and Secretary of the Central Committee of the Yemeni Socialist Party), A. R. Ratib (Member of the Politburo)
- Sudan: Sherif Ghasim (Member of the Politburo of the Sudanese Socialist Union)
- Trinidad and Tobago: James O'Neil (Ambassador to Belgium, non-resident Ambassador to Yugoslavia)
- Tunisia: Sadok Mokaddem (President of the Assembly, and Member of the Politburo of the Socialist Destourian Party) and Habib Bourguiba, Jr.
- Upper Volta: Tiemoko Marc Garango (Ambassador to West Germany, non-resident Ambassador to Yugoslavia)
- Uruguay: Walter Ravenna (Minister of National Defence)
- Vatican City: Achille Silvestrini (Secretary of the Council for Public Affairs of the Church)
- Zaire: Nzondomyo a' Dokpe Lingo (President of the National Assembly)

==== Delegations of parties and organizations ====
===== International organizations =====
- Arab League: Chedli Klibi (Secretary-General)
- (European Union) European Parliament: Simone Veil (President)
- (European Union) Council of Europe: Franz Karasek (Secretary General)
- (European Union) European Commission: Wilhelm Haferkamp (Vice-President)
- Commonwealth: Shridath Ramphal (Secretary-General)
- OECD: Emiel van Lennep (Secretary-General)
- United Nations: Kurt Waldheim (Secretary-General), P. N. Dhar
- UNESCO: Amadou-Mahtar M'Bow (Director-General)

===== Liberation movements =====
- Palestine Liberation Organization: Yasser Arafat (Chairman)
- Polisario Front: Mohamed Abdelaziz (Chairman of the Revolutionary Council)
- SWAPO: David Meroro (President of the People's Assembly)

===== Political parties and trade unions =====
- Communist Party of Australia: Bernie Taft (Secretary)
- Labour Party of Australia: Jane Taggart
- Communist Party of Austria: Franz Muhri (president) and Josef Nichel-Vizer (Member of the Central Committee)
- Bangladesh Awami League: Kamal Hosein
- Communist Party of Belgium: Louis Van Geyt (president), Jean Debruvere (Member of the Politbureau)
- Socialist Party (Belgium): André Cools (president), Irène Pétry (member of the National Bureau, Vice President of the Socialist International, President of the Socialist International Women)
- Communist Party of Chile: Milo Carres Orlando (Member of the Politbureau)
- Socialist Party of Chile: Carlos Altamirano (Secretary), Clodomiro Almeida (Secretary)
- Popular Unitary Action Movement: Ricardo Lopez
- Radical Party of Chile: Benjamin Tekliski (Executive Secretary)
- Communist Party of Denmark: Jørgen Jensen (president), Hans Kloster (member of the Central Committee)
- Socialist People's Party of Denmark: Gert Petersen (president)
- Dominican Revolutionary Party: Francisco Pena Gomez
- Labor Party of Egypt: Hamid Zidani
- Arab Trade Unions (Egypt): Fati Mohammad (Secretary-General)
- Communist Party of France: Georges Marchais (Secretary general)
- French Socialist Party: François Mitterrand (First secretary), Lionel Jospin (National Secretary)
- French Unified Socialist Party: Maurice Revenel (National secretary), Victor Ledik (National secretary)
- French Democratic Confederation of Labour: Edmond Maire (Secretary-General ), Jacques Chereque (Deputy Secretary-General)
- General Confederation of Labour (France): Gerard Gomez (National Secretary)
- French Radical Party of the Left: Francois Lissere
- People's National Party (Ghana): Nana Okutwer Beko (president)
- Communist Party of Greece (Interior): Babis Drakopoulos (Secretary General)
- Communist Party of Greece: Charilaos Florakis (Secretary General)
- United Democratic Left (Greece): Manolis Glezos
- Party of Democratic Socialism (Greece): Yiangos Pesmazoglou, Georgios Milonas, Charalambos Protopapas
- PASOK: Andreas Papandreou (President)
- General Confederation of Greek Workers: Nicholas Papageorgiou (President)
- Communist Party of the Netherlands: Henk Hoekstra (chairman)
- Labour Party (Netherlands): Joop den Uyl (Parliamentary group leader)
- Communist Party of Ireland: Andy Barr (president)
- Communist Party of Italy: Enrico Berlinguer (Secretary General)
- Italian Socialist Party: Bettino Craxi (Secretary General)
- Italian Democratic Socialist Party: Ruggero Puletti (deputy Secretary-General), Giuseppe Amadei
- Proletarian Unity Party (Italy) and the Workers Movement for Socialism: Lucio Magri (Secretary-General), Luca Cafiero (Secretary)
- Christian Democracy (Italy): Vito Lattanzio
- Japanese Communist Party: Kamejiro Senaga, Sakundo Onuma
- Socialist Party of Japan: Tomio Kawahami, Eiji Yasai
- African National Congress: Thomas Nkobi
- Colombian Communist Party: Alvaro Delgado
- Lebanese Communist Party: Nicolas Shawi (Secretary General)
- Progressive Socialist Party: Walid Jumblatt (President)
- Socialist Union of Popular Forces: Abderahime Buabid (Secretary General)
- Party of Progress and Socialism (Morocco): Ali Yata (Secretary General)
- Communist Party of Mauritius: Chandramun (President)
- Mexican Communist Party: Marcos Leonel Pasades (Member of the executive committee)
- German Communist Party: Herbert Mies, Carlos Schroder
- Social Democratic Party of Germany: Willy Brandt (President, President of the Socialist International)
- National Party of Nigeria: Augustus Akinloye (President)
- Portuguese Communist Party: Álvaro Cunhal (Secretary General)
- Socialist Party (Portugal): Mário Soares (Secretary General)
- Left-wing Union for the Socialist Democracy (Portugal): António Lopes Cardoso (Secretary General)
- Sammarinese Communist Party: Umberto Barulli (Secretary General)
- Sammarinese Socialist Party: Giuseppe della Balda
- Syrian Communist Party: Daniel Neme
- Communist Party of Spain: Santiago Carrillo (Secretary General)
- Spanish Socialist Workers' Party: Felipe González (Secretary General)
- Unión General de Trabajadores (Spain): Anton Valentin
- Sri Lanka Freedom Party: Sirimavo Bandaranaike (President)
- Swiss Party of Labour: Jean Vincent (honorary President)
- Progressive Organizations of Switzerland: Georg Degen
- Left Party – the Communists (Sweden): Lars Werner (President), Bo Hammar (member of the Politbureau)
- Swedish Social Democratic Party: Sten Andersson (Secretary)
- Republican People's Party (Turkey): Bülent Ecevit (President)
- Communist Party of Britain: Gordon McLennan (Secretary General)
- Labour Party (UK): James Callaghan (Leader)

== Media coverage ==
The funeral was broadcast live by many countries on their state television channels. In West Germany, it was aired on Deutsches Fernsehen. Austrian television broadcast a film memorializing Tito for an hour prior to the funeral. In the U.S., all three major television networks covered the funeral, as did TF1 and Antenne 2 in France. In total, 44 countries broadcast Tito's funeral.

== See also ==
- Death and state funeral of Leonid Brezhnev (1982)
- Death and state funeral of Queen Elizabeth II (2022)
