= Jovanka Broz =

First Lady of Yugoslavia

- Јованка Броз
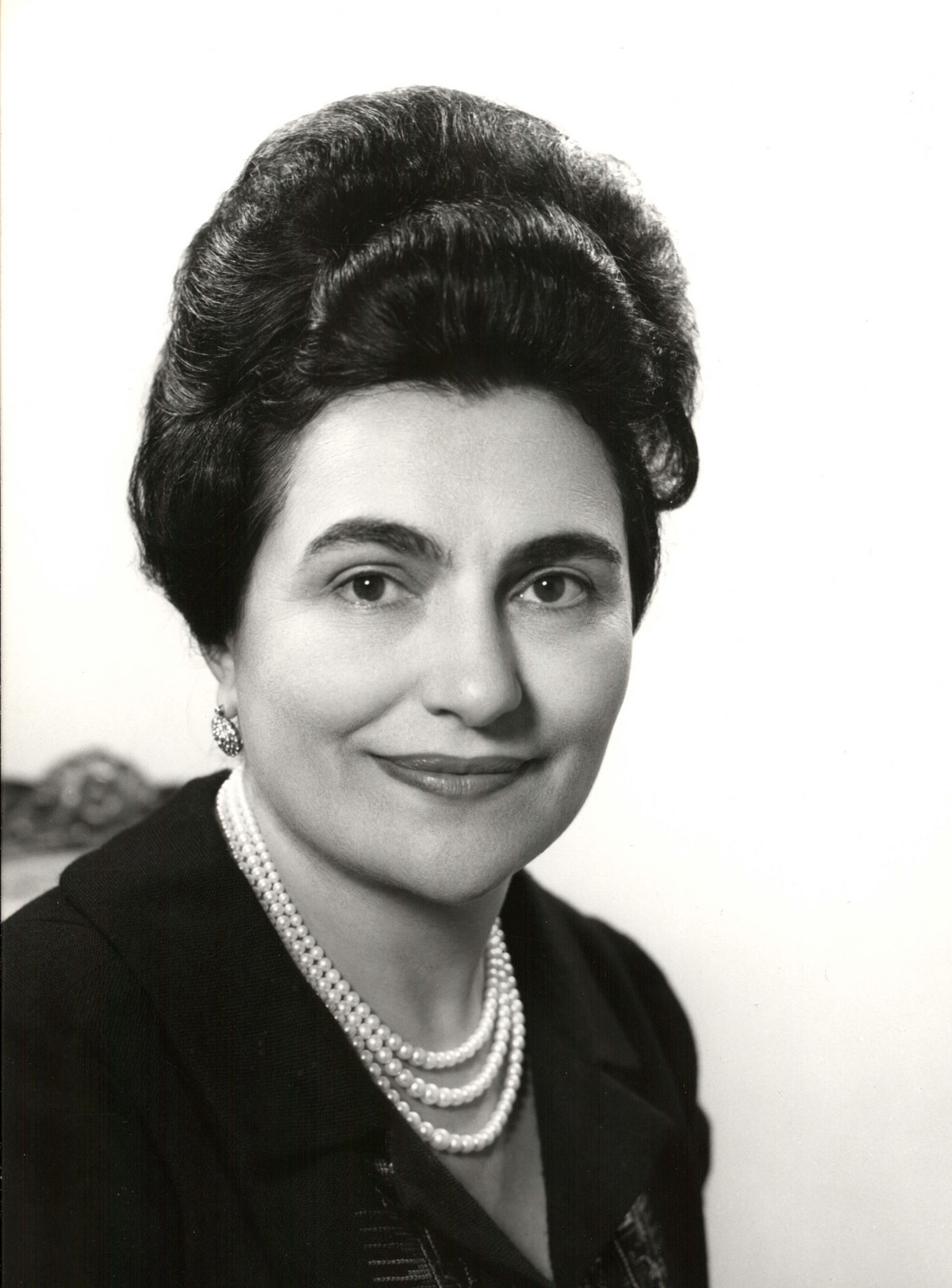
- Broz in 1960

First Lady of Yugoslavia
- In role 14 January 1953 – 4 May 1980
- President: Josip Broz Tito
- Preceded by: Post established
- Succeeded by: Mira Stupica

Personal details
- Born: Jovanka Budisavljević; 7 December 1924 Pećane near Udbina, Kingdom of Serbs, Croats and Slovenes (modern Croatia)
- Died: 20 October 2013 (aged 88) Belgrade, Serbia
- Resting place: House of Flowers, Belgrade, Serbia; 44°47′12.21″N 20°27′6.1″E
- Spouse: Josip Broz Tito (m. 1952; died 1980)
- Parents: Mihailo Budisavljević; Milica Svilar
- Awards: National Order of Merit

Military service
- Allegiance: Yugoslavia
- Branch/service: Yugoslav Partisans; Yugoslav People's Army
- Years of service: 1941–52
- Rank: Lieutenant colonel
- Battles/wars: World War II

Jovanka Broz (née Budisavljević; Serbian Cyrillic: Јованка Броз, née Будисављевић; 7 December 1924 – 20 October 2013) was the First Lady of Yugoslavia from 1952 until 1980 as the wife of Yugoslav president Josip Broz Tito. She was a lieutenant colonel in the Yugoslav People's Army.

Born in Lika, she joined the anti-fascist resistance movement in 1941 and served in the Partisan army during World War II in Yugoslavia, where she was wounded twice and awarded the Order of Bravery. In 1945, she was assigned as Tito's personal secretary and later became his wife in 1952.

As First Lady, she participated in numerous diplomatic events and hosted foreign leaders. In the 1970s, tensions with Tito's close aides led to accusations of political interference, resulting in her isolation and eventual separation from Tito in 1977. Afterward, she lived in seclusion until Tito's death in May 1980, when she appeared in public for the first time in three years at his funeral. In July 1980, she was expelled from her residence and forcibly placed under unofficial house arrest.

She lived without personal identification documents or a pension, and until her death was unable to complete the probate proceedings necessary to determine what she was entitled to inherit following her husband's death. After the breakup of Yugoslavia, she continued to live in isolation. In 2009, after three decades, she finally received personal identification documents. Until the end of her life, she remained extremely reclusive and rarely gave interviews. She became ill in August 2013 and was subsequently admitted to the Emergency Center of Belgrade, where she died. She was buried with full state honors at the House of Flowers.

She was a recipient of the Commemorative Medal of the Partisans of 1941 and numerous other Yugoslav and foreign decorations.

== Early life and ancestry ==
Jovanka Budisavljević was born on 7 December 1924, into a Croatian Serb family in the village of Pećane near Udbina, in the Lika region, then part of the Kingdom of Serbs, Croats and Slovenes, now Croatia. Her parents were Milica (née Svilar) and Mihailo "Mićo" Budisavljević. She had four siblings: older brother Maksim (b. 1923), younger brother Petar (b. 1926), and two younger sisters, Nada (b. 1934) and Zora (b. 1936). She was named after her maternal grandmother, Jovanka Svilar (née Šobot).

Her father, Mihailo, emigrated to the United States as a young man, where several of his uncles lived, before returning to Yugoslavia in 1920. He purchased 20 acres of farmland and married Milica Svilar. The couple had three children before Mihailo briefly moved to Canada. Fluent in English and well travelled, he became known in the village as the “rich American.” During the Second World War in Yugoslavia, he served as a translator for an American military mission that landed in the Krbava Field. After Milica died of tuberculosis in 1937, Mihailo remarried her relative, Soka Svilar, with whom he had a daughter, Mara. Mihailo himself died of typhus in 1944.

Jovanka came from the prominent Budisavljević family, a family of Serb origin with a long history in the region. One of her ancestors, Prota Tomo Budisavljević, was an Orthodox priest and army major who defended the Habsburg frontier against Ottoman incursions. Tomo’s father, Marko Budisavljević, was ennobled in 1787 by Joseph II, Holy Roman Emperor. Tomo’s daughter, Sofia, married Nikola Mandić, and their daughter, Georgina “Đuka” Mandić, became the mother of the renowned inventor Nikola Tesla. As a result, Jovanka and Tesla were distant relatives, sharing the same great-great-great-grandfather. In her autobiography, Jovanka mentions her father meeting with Tesla many times while living in the United States.

In April 1941, following the Axis invasion and the establishment of the Independent State of Croatia, the Budisavljević family was forced to flee their home amid the Ustaše regime’s violent persecution of Serbs. The family’s home was eventually burned down by Ustaše forces. Shortly thereafter, at the age of 17, Jovanka joined the Yugoslav Partisans. Her brothers, Maksim and Petar, were both killed by the Ustaše.

== Life with and around Tito ==
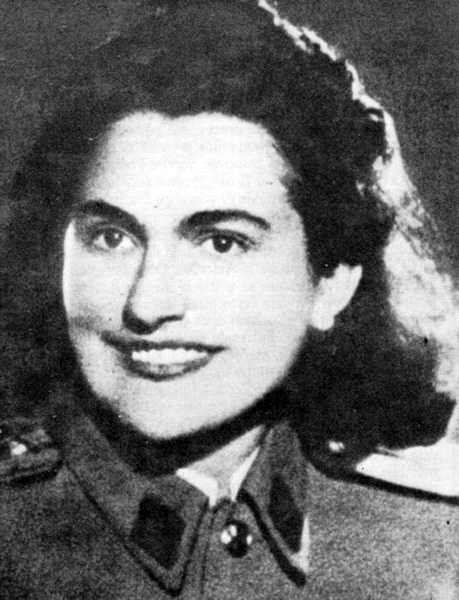
Jovanka Broz as a Partisan in the 1940s.

Former JNA General Marjan Kranjc says Jovanka was assigned to the Marshal as early as 1945 as part of the personnel that checked his food and overall cleanliness for the purpose of preventing disease. After the death of Tito's great love Davorjanka Paunović, whose grave is in the Dedinje Royal Compound, in 1946, Jovanka became his personal secretary according to Kranjc: "In this way she became a part of the innermost security ring around Tito and had to sign a secret cooperation agreement with the State Security Service (SDB), which was the law."

=== Initial relationship ===
Milovan Đilas, one of the communist revolutionary movement's leading members and ideologues, and a subsequent dissident, provides more details about Jovanka during this period in Druženje s Titom (Friendship with Tito). According to him, the relationship with Tito was extremely difficult for her:

She never appeared outside of Tito's company. We'd see her many times as she was keeping a vigil for hours in a hallway [while we're holding a late-night meeting inside], to make sure she is available if Tito needs anything as he's going to sleep. Because of that, the wrath and the lack of trust she was receiving from other servants was almost inevitable. [According to what was on offer] the motives for her closeness to Tito could've been explained in endless ways, none of which would show her character in a good light: career climbing, cajolery, malicious female extravagance, exploitation of Tito's lonesomeness... As far as she was concerned, Tito was a war and communist party deity for whom everyone was supposed to sacrifice everything they had. She was a woman deep in the process of comprehending Tito as a man, while also increasingly and devotedly falling in love with him. She was resigned to burn out or fade away, unknown and unrecognised if need be, next to the divine man about whom she dreamt and to whom she could only belong now that he has chosen her.

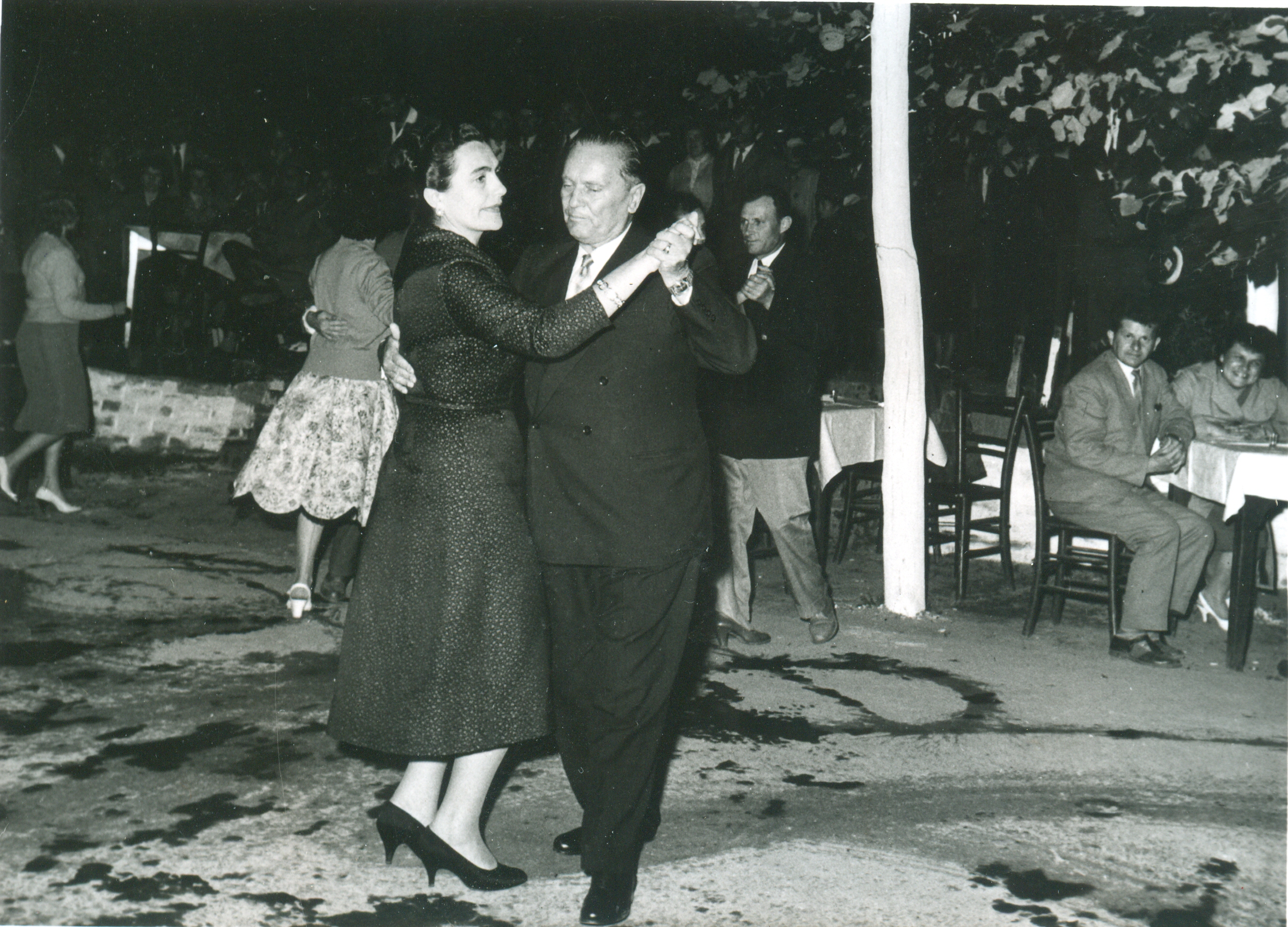
Jovanka and Tito dancing during a visit to Negotin in 1959

=== Marriage ===
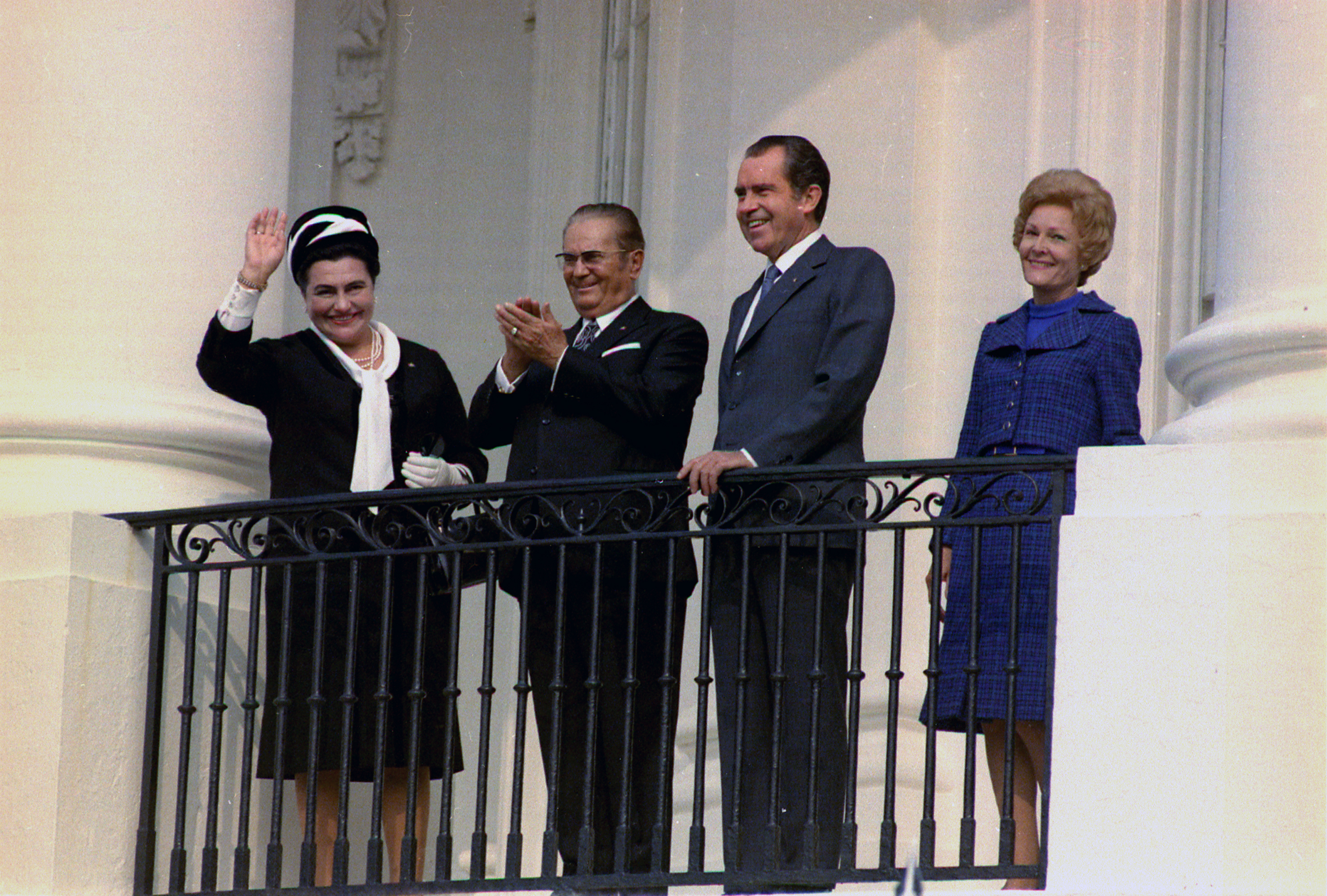
Jovanka Broz in 1971 during a visit to the Nixon White House, with Tito, President Richard Nixon, and First Lady Pat Nixon.

The exact date of their marriage is also subject to debate. The secret wedding ceremony happened either during 1951 or in April 1952; however, the location of the ceremony is also not clear. Some sources say it took place in the Dunavka villa in Ilok while others list Belgrade's municipality of Čukarica as the location.

=== Deterioration ===
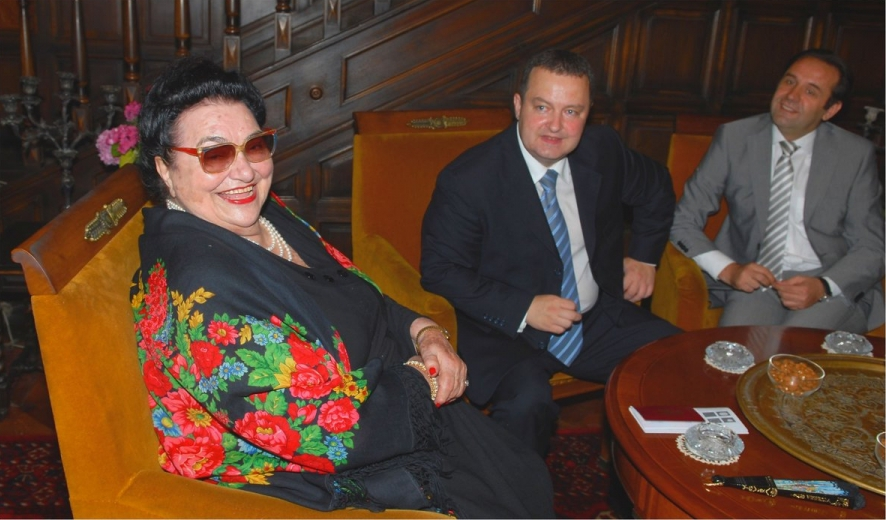
Jovanka in her house in June 2009 with Ivica Dačić and Rasim Ljajić.

Many believed her to be a victim of the ambitions of various politicians who managed to manipulate the ageing Marshal into turning against his wife. Ivo Eterović, a writer and photographer with unprecedented decades-long access to Yugoslavia's ruling couple, stated "the main culprits for the Tito-Jovanka split are that pig Stane Dolanc and General Nikola Ljubičić". In 1975, Tito left their common home, and she did not see him from 1977 to 1980 when he died. After Marshal Tito's death she lived in seclusion in Dedinje, a Belgrade suburb, under house arrest.

=== Death ===
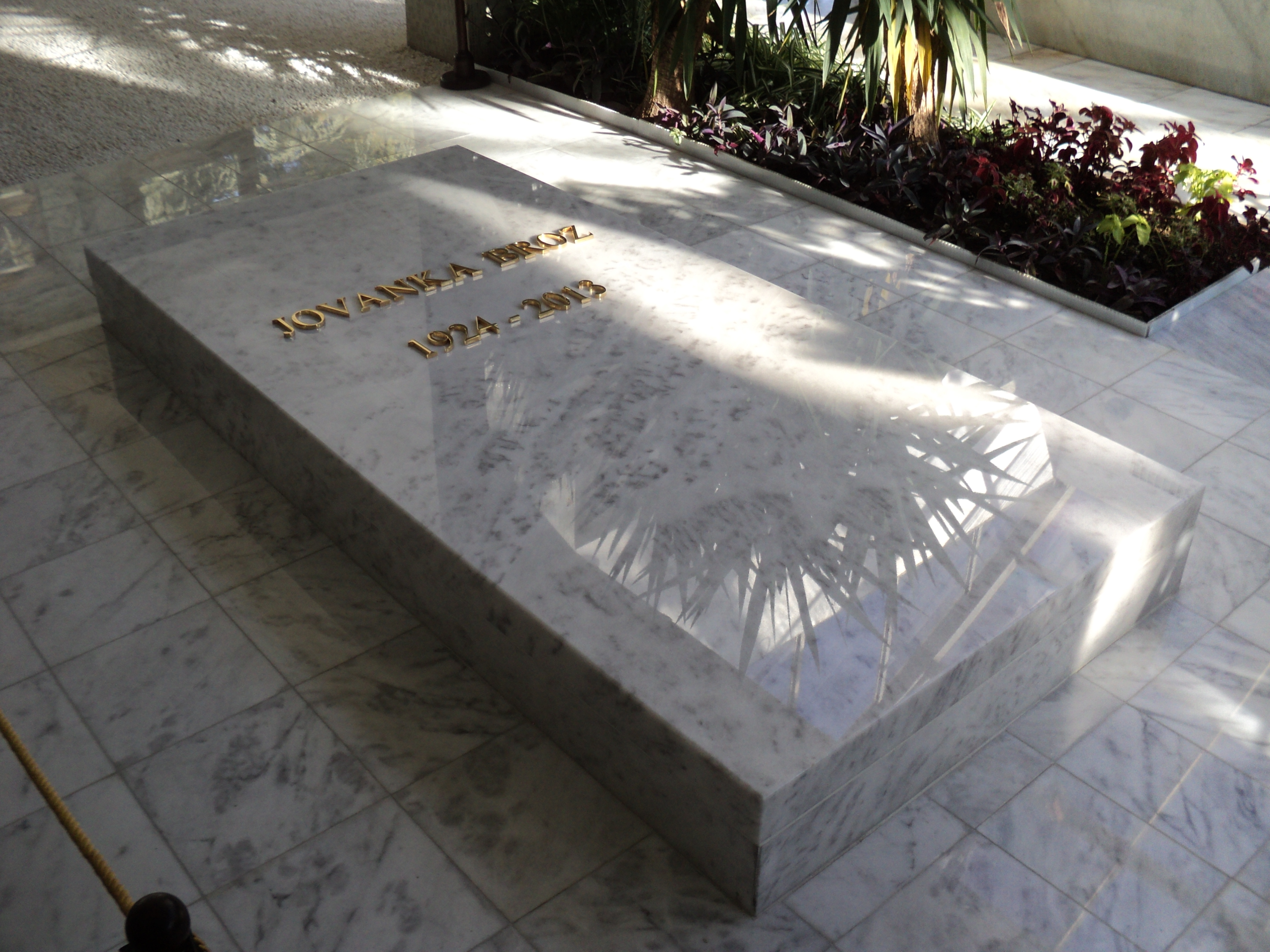
Jovanka Broz's tomb in House of Flowers mausoleum, Belgrade.

Jovanka Broz was hospitalised on 23 August 2013, and died from a heart attack in the Emergency Center of Belgrade on 20 October 2013, aged 88. She was buried in the House of Flowers mausoleum near her husband's grave.

=== Memoirs ===
The book titled My Life, My Truth was released three weeks before she died.

== Honours ==
- France: Dame Grand Cross of the National Order of Merit (8 May 1956).
- Netherlands: Dame Grand Cross of the Order of the Crown (22 October 1970).
- Iran: Commemorative Medal of the 2500th Anniversary of the founding of the Persian Empire (14 October 1971).
- (Kingdom of Nepal) Nepalese Royal Family: Member First Class of the Most Illustrious Order of the Three Divine Powers (2 February 1974).

== References in popular culture ==
In the British television series Doctor Who, the fictional character of Tegan Jovanka, one of the companions of the Fourth and Fifth Doctors, and one of the longest running companions of the Doctor, got the name as a combination of Tegan, named by one of the producers' niece, and Jovanka, after Jovanka Broz.
