= Serbia–NATO relations =

- NATO: Serbia

Since 2015, the relationship between Serbia and the North Atlantic Treaty Organization (NATO) has been regulated in the context of an Individual Partnership Action Plan (IPAP).

Map of Europe with countries in six different colors based on their affiliation with NATO as follows: Members of NATO Membership Action Plan Enhanced Opportunity Partner Individual Partnership Action Plan Partnership for Peace

NATO member countries In the process of accession Promised invitations Membership is not the goal Have not announced their membership intentions

NATO members and partners in Europe NATO members Membership Action Plan countries Intensified Dialogue countries Individual Partnership Action Plan countries Partnership for Peace members Aspiring Partnership for Peace members

== Background ==
Yugoslavia's communist government sided with the Eastern Bloc at the beginning of the Cold War, but pursued a policy of neutrality following the Tito–Stalin split in 1948. It was a founding member of the Non-Aligned Movement in 1961. Since that country's dissolution most of its successor states have joined NATO, but the largest of them, Serbia, has maintained Yugoslavia's policy of neutrality.

=== 1992–2006: Yugoslav Wars, NATO bombing, non-alignment ===
The NATO intervention in Bosnia and Herzegovina in 1995 against Bosnian-Serbian forces during the Bosnian War and in 1999 in the Kosovo War by bombing targets in Serbia (then part of FR Yugoslavia) strained relations between Serbia and NATO. After the overthrow of President Slobodan Milošević, Serbia wanted to improve its relations with NATO. However membership in the military alliance remained highly controversial, because among political parties and large sections of society there were still resentments due to the bombings in 1999. In the years under Prime Minister Zoran Đinđić the country (then Serbia and Montenegro) did not rule out joining NATO. However, after Đinđić's assassination in 2003, Serbia increasingly started pursuing a course of military neutrality. National Assembly of Serbia passed a resolution in 2007 which declared their military neutrality until such time as a referendum was held on the issue.

=== 2006–2011: Partnership for Peace ===
Serbia joined the Partnership for Peace programme during the 2006 Riga Summit. While this programme is sometimes the first step towards full NATO membership, it was uncertain whether Serbia perceives it as signaling an intent to join the alliance. However, the West's broad recognition of Kosovo's contested declaration of independence in February 2008, while it was a protectorate of the United Nations with security support from NATO, further strained relations between Serbia and NATO.

Although current Serbian priorities do not include NATO membership, the Alliance offered Serbia an invitation to enter the intensified dialogue programme in 2008 whenever the country was ready. On 1 October 2008, Serbian Defence Minister Dragan Šutanovac signed the Information Exchange Agreement with the NATO, one of the prerequisites for fuller membership in the Partnership for Peace programme.

=== 2011–2022: Individual Partnership Action Plan ===
In April 2011 Serbia's request for an Individual Partnership Action Plan was approved by NATO, and Serbia submitted a draft IPAP in May 2013. The agreement was finalized on 15 January 2015. It regularly participates in its military maneuvers, and hosted a joint civil protection exercise with NATO in 2018.

=== 2022–present: Russian invasion of Ukraine ===
Following the start of the Russian invasion of Ukraine, several neutral states reconsidered their alignment, including Finland and Sweden which applied for NATO membership. However, Serbian President Aleksandar Vučić, reiterated in that his government was not interested in NATO membership. The minor Serbian Renewal Movement, which has two seats in the National Assembly, and the Liberal Democratic Party, which currently has none, remain the most vocal political parties in favor of NATO membership. The Democratic Party abandoned its pro-NATO attitude, claiming the Partnership for Peace is enough.

Serbia maintains close relations with Russia, due to their shared Slavic and Eastern Orthodox culture but also due to its support on the Kosovo issue. Serbia and Belarus are the only European states which refused to impose sanctions on Russia in response to its invasion of Ukraine.

== Opinion polling on NATO membership ==
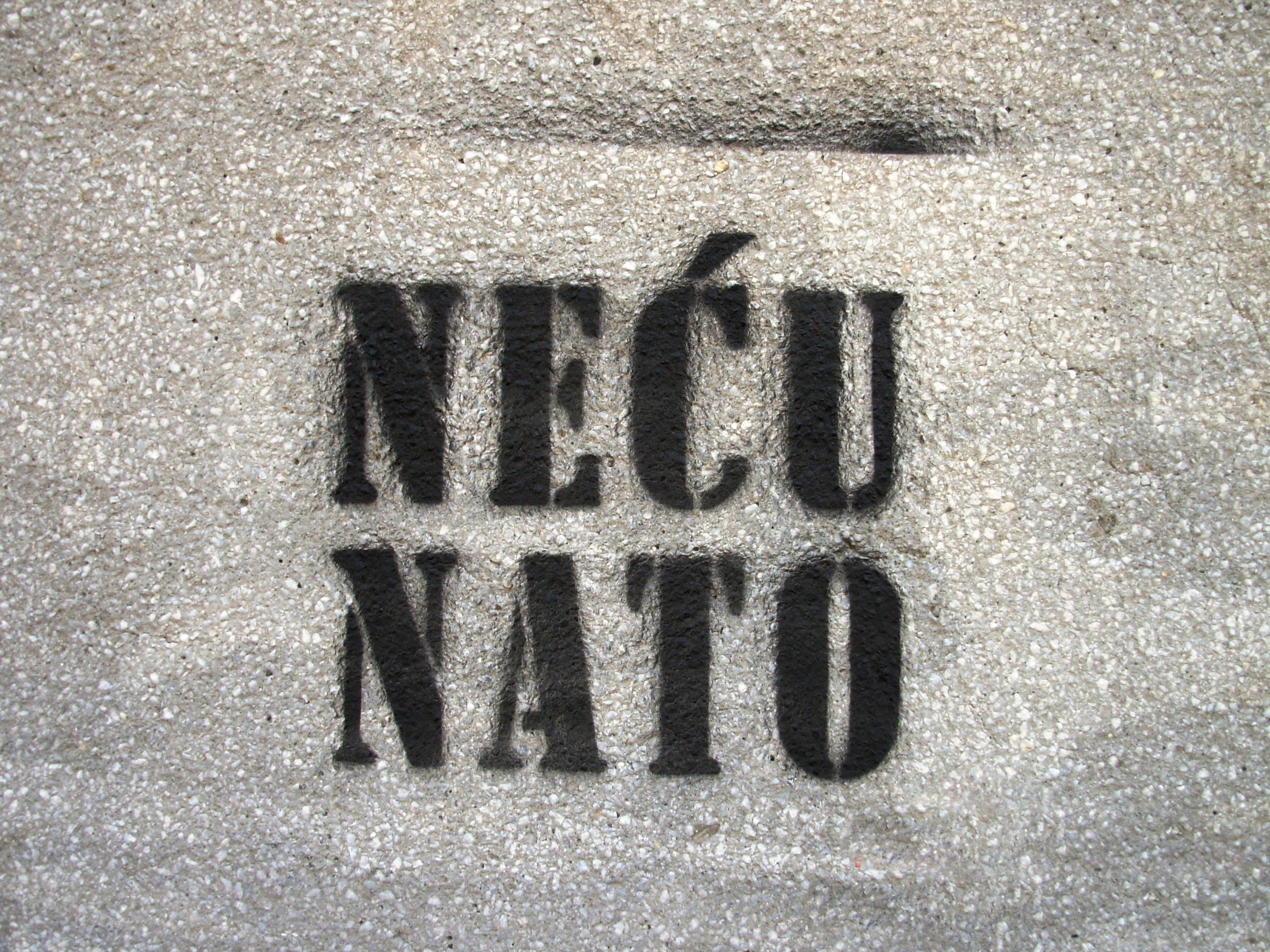
Neću NATO (lit. 'I do not want NATO') anti-NATO signs, 2011

An opinion poll in 2007 showed that 28% of Serbian citizens supported NATO membership, with 58% supporting the Partnership for Peace. However, following NATO's open support to Kosovo's declaration of independence in 2008, support for NATO integration significantly dropped. The 2022 poll found that 82% of Serbians opposed joining NATO, while only 10% supported the idea.

Opinion polls on NATO membership of Serbia
Dates conducted	Pollster	Client	Sample size	Support	Opposed	Neutral or DK	Lead	Ref.
7 March 2024	Sweden acceedes to NATO							
February 2024	NSPM		1000	7.6%	84.6%	7.8%	77%	
September 2023	NSPM		1100	7.5%	84.2%	8.3%	76.7%	
August 2023	NSPM		1000	7.5%	84.2%	8.3%	76.7%	
June 2023	NSPM		1100	9.4%	84.6%	6%	75.2%	
May 2023	NSPM		1000	8.3%	83.5%	8.2%	75.2%	
4 April 2023	Finland acceedes to NATO							
April 2023	NSPM		1000	8%	85.4%	6.6%	77.4%	
24 February 2022	Russia invades Ukraine							
March 2022	Ninamedia	Institute for European Affairs	1228	10%	82%	8%	72%	
March 2017	Ninamedia	Institute for European Affairs	1204	11%	84%	5%	73%	
16 March 2014	Russia annexes Crimea							
7 August 2008	Russia invades Georgia							
17 February 2008	Kosovo declares independence							
September 2007	TNS Medium Gallup	Angus Reid Global Monitor	1000	28%	55%	17%	27%	

== Relationship timeline ==
Event	Date
Partnership for Peace	2006-12-14

== Serbia's foreign relations with NATO member states ==
- Albania
- Belgium
- Bulgaria
- Canada
- Croatia
- Czech Republic
- Denmark
- Estonia
- Finland
- France
- Germany
- Greece
- Hungary
- Iceland
- Italy
- Latvia
- Lithuania
- Luxembourg
- Montenegro
- Netherlands
- North Macedonia
- Norway
- Poland
- Portugal
- Romania
- Slovakia
- Slovenia
- Spain
- Sweden
- Turkey
- United Kingdom
- United States

== See also ==
- Foreign relations of Serbia
- Foreign relations of NATO
  - Enlargement of NATO
  - Individual Partnership Action Plan
  - NATO open door policy
  - Partnership for Peace
- Accession of Serbia to the European Union
- Serbia–United States relations
- Russia–Serbia relations
