= Foreign relations of Serbia =

Foreign relations of Serbia are formulated and executed by the Government of Serbia through its Ministry of Foreign Affairs. Serbia has established full diplomatic relations with most world nations – 189 UN member states and 2 non-member observer state, most recently with the Marshall Islands in 2024.

Serbia is a member of the United Nations, the International Criminal Court, the Council of Europe, the Organization for Security and Co-operation in Europe, the Central European Initiative, the Central European Free Trade Agreement, the International Monetary Fund, the World Bank Group, the European Bank for Reconstruction and Development, the World Customs Organization, the Interpol, the International Organization for Standardization, International Red Cross and Red Crescent Movement, the International Olympic Committee, and other international organizations.

== History ==
=== Medieval Serbia ===
Medieval Serbia’s foreign policy evolved from defensive autonomy under the Vlastimirović dynasty to ambitious expansion under the Nemanjić dynasty kingdom, and finally to desperate survival under the Serbian Despotate. Serbia balanced relations with Byzantine Empire, Bulgaria, Kingdom of Hungary, Republic of Venice, and the Ottomans, using alliances, marriages, and Orthodoxy to assert influence. While achieving a brief imperial peak under Stefan Dušan, Serbia’s fragmentation and the Ottoman rise led to its eventual subjugation. Its foreign policy was marked by pragmatism, adaptability, and a persistent drive to unite Serb lands, leaving a lasting cultural and political legacy in the Balkans.

=== Principality of Serbia ===
Serbia gained its autonomy from the Ottoman Empire in the Serbian Revolution (1804–1817), although Ottoman troops continued to garrison the capital, Belgrade, until 1867.

The Principality of Serbia’s foreign relations were defined by its quest for independence from the Ottoman Empire, reliance on Russian support, and cautious navigation of Austrian influence. Serbia cultivated alliances with Principality of Montenegro and Kingdom of Greece, while relations with Bulgaria turned competitive. The Ottoman Empire, Austria (later Austria-Hungary), and Russian Empire, shaped Serbia’s options, with the 1878 Congress of Berlin granting independence but limiting territorial gains. Serbia’s diplomacy balanced nationalist aspirations with pragmatic cooperation, laying the groundwork for its later role as a Balkans power.

Serbia explored alliances with other Balkan states to counter Ottoman and Austrian influence, however, its small size and economic dependence limited its diplomatic leverage.

=== Kingdom of Serbia ===
In 1882, Serbia was proclaimed a kingdom under King Milan I of the House of Obrenović, later succeeded by the House of Karađorđević.

The Kingdom of Serbia’s foreign relations was driven by its quest for territorial expansion and South Slavic unification. Serbia aimed to unite South Slavic territories, particularly those with Serb populations, under the concept of "Greater Serbia" or South Slavic unity (Yugoslavism). This ambition often put it at odds with the Ottoman Empire and Austria, which controlled Serb-populated regions like Bosnia and Vojvodina.

In the First Balkan War, Serbia, alongside Greece, Bulgaria, and Montenegro, defeated the Ottoman Empire, gaining Kosovo and parts of Macedonia. The Second Balkan War against Bulgaria secured further territorial gains but deepened regional rivalry with Bulgaria.

Austria-Hungary's annexation of Bosnia and Herzegovina in 1908 deeply alienated Serbia. A trade dispute with Austria-Hungary, which imposed a customs blockade to pressure Serbia economically, highlighted Serbia’s dependence on external markets. Serbia countered by diversifying trade with France and Britain, strengthening Western ties. Russia, a fellow Slavic and Orthodox Christian state, provided diplomatic and military support, viewing Serbia as a counterweight to Austria-Hungary in the Balkans. Russia’s support was crucial during the July Crisis of 1914, when Serbia faced Austria-Hungary’s ultimatum after the assassination of Archduke Franz Ferdinand.

Serbia’s foreign policy was tested by Austria-Hungary’s invasion following the Sarajevo assassination. Serbia’s resistance, supported by Russia and France, led to initial victories but eventual occupation by 1915. Serbia’s government-in-exile in Corfu maintained diplomatic efforts, culminating in the 1918 creation of the Kingdom of Yugoslavia (initially Kingdom of Serbs, Croats, and Slovenes), achieving Serbian main goal of South Slavic unification.

=== Yugoslav Wars and international isolation ===
During the 1990s, Serbia was part of the Federal Republic of Yugoslavia, comprising Serbia and Montenegro, formed in 1992 after the breakup of the Socialist Federal Republic of Yugoslavia. The foreign policy, dominated by Serbia under President Slobodan Milošević, was heavily influenced by the Yugoslav Wars and international isolation.

Serbia provided support to Serb forces in Serb-populated areas across the former Yugoslavia, though it officially denied direct military involvement until the Kosovo War. This led to involvement in conflicts in Croatia (1991–1995), Bosnia and Herzegovina (1992–1995), and Kosovo (1998–1999). These actions strained relations with the international community and thus country faced severe international sanctions. This isolation was marked by ruptured diplomatic relations, and exclusion from international organizations (such as the UN, OSCE, and the Council of Europe) as well blocked access to international financial institutions (the IMF and World Bank), profoundly shaping Serbia’s foreign policy and global standing. The FR Yugoslavia was barred from the UN General Assembly in 1992, with its claim to be the sole successor to the Socialist Federal Republic of Yugoslavia rejected. Instead, the UN declared the SFR Yugoslavia dissolved.

Relations with Western countries, particularly the United States and key European nations, deteriorated sharply, culminating in the closure of the United States embassy in Belgrade in 1999 before NATO’s bombing campaign. The 1999 NATO bombing campaign, led by the United States, marked a low point, with the U.S. embassy remaining closed until 2001, reflecting a near-total suspension of formal diplomatic ties. Relations with Western countries, particularly the United States and key European nations, deteriorated sharply resulting in severing or reducing diplomatic presence in Belgrade. Germany, a key supporter of Croatian and Bosnian independence, recalled its ambassador in 1992, maintaining only minimal consular functions throughout the 1990s. The United Kingdom and France followed suit, with embassies operating at reduced capacity or closing during the Kosovo War. The 1999 NATO bombing campaign, marked a low point: the United States closed its embassy in Belgrade, reflecting a near-total suspension of formal diplomatic ties.

Facing Western ostracism, country sought support from traditional allies like Russia and Greece. Russia provided diplomatic backing, vetoing harsher UN measures and maintaining an embassy in Belgrade, though its support was constrained by Russia’s own post-Soviet challenges. Greece, despite EU membership, maintained relatively warm relations due to cultural and Orthodox ties, serving as a diplomatic bridge to the West. China also opposed NATO’s actions, particularly after the 1999 bombing of its Belgrade embassy, but its support was largely rhetorical. The Non-Aligned Movement, once a cornerstone of the Socialist Yugoslavia foreign policy, offered little practical support, as many member states aligned with the key western countries or remained neutral to avoid entanglement in the Yugoslav conflicts.

=== Democratic transition ===
In the 2000s, Serbia's foreign policy has shifted dramatically from isolation to reintegration, with a focus on restoring and expanding diplomatic ties with Western countries. The overthrow of Milošević in 2000 marked a turning point, shifting from isolation to reintegration to the international community. Country was re-admitted to the United Nations as a new member soon thereafter while rejoining also the UN, OSCE and the Council of Europe as well as secured IMF and World Bank membership. Relations with Western nations began to thaw. Key EU states, including Germany, France, and the United Kingdom, reestablished full diplomatic relations, with embassies resuming normal operations. Germany, in particular, emerged as a key partner, investing heavily in Serbia’s economy. The relations with the United States were also restored with full diplomatic relations. The European Union became Serbia's primary diplomatic focus, with the Stabilization and Association Agreement in 2008 and candidacy status in 2012 marking key milestones.

Montenegro’s independence in 2006 resulted in restoring Serbia as an independent nation after 88 years, with country being the sole successor state of the State Union of Serbia and Montenegro.

=== Contemporary period ===
Serbia since early 2010s have been pursuing a multi-vector foreign policy, balancing relations with the European Union, the United States, Russia, and China. Former President of Serbia Boris Tadić referred to relations with the European Union, United States, Russia, and China as the four pillars of Serbian foreign policy. This approach aims to maintain strategic autonomy.

The European Union remains central to Serbia’s diplomacy and by far the largest trading partner. Its accession process has been slow, with 22 of 35 negotiation chapters opened by 2025 and only a few closed. Key obstacles include rule of law reforms and "normalizing" relations with Kosovo. Public support for EU membership in Serbia has dropped to around 40% by 2025 due to perceived double standards of the EU and its key member-states towards Serbia. Serbia condemned Russia’s 2022 invasion of Ukraine while avoiding to align with EU sanctions against Russia, reflecting its neutral stance.

Country has maintained robust diplomatic ties with Western countries, but Serbia’s refusal to recognize Kosovo’s independence remains a major sticking point and its balancing act with non-Western powers (Russia and China, in particular) to some degree complicate relations with the United States and key European states.

Serbia relies primarily on Russia and China for diplomatic support on Kosovo issue. The 2016 strategic partnership agreement and country's focal role in the Belt and Road Initiative have deepened ties with China which has become second biggest trading partner as well as investor of numerous infrastructure projects in Serbia (like the high-speed railways, motorways, and the Belgrade Metro).

Serbia has worked to improve relations with those neighboring countries (Croatia, Bosnia and Herzegovina, and Albania) with which it has a long-standing historical tensions. However, relations with Croatia remain strained due to historical tensions, while Kosovo’s status fuels occasional flare-ups. Serbia supports the Open Balkan initiative, launched in 2019, to boost regional economic cooperation with Albania and North Macedonia.

== Diplomatic relations ==
List of countries which Serbia maintains diplomatic relations with:

#	Country	Date
1	Russia	23 February 1838
2	France	19 March 1839
3	United Kingdom	7 February 1870
4	Bulgaria	18 January 1879
5	Greece	18 January 1879
6	Italy	18 January 1879
7	Romania	26 April 1879
8	Turkey	10 June 1879
9	United States	14 October 1881
10	Venezuela	13 April 1882
11	Japan	15 June 1882
12	Guatemala	15 August 1882
13	Portugal	14 November 1882
14	Hungary	21 November 1882
15	Belgium	15 March 1886
16	Netherlands	26 April 1899
17	Cuba	4 November 1902
18	Uruguay	19 February 1904
19	Honduras	20 February 1904
20	Egypt	1 February 1908
21	Dominican Republic	1 March 1912
22	Albania	25 April 1914
23	Spain	14 October 1916
24	Switzerland	10 December 1916
25	Norway	9 March 1917
26	Denmark	19 October 1917
27	Sweden	1 November 1917
28	Czech Republic	9 January 1919
29	Poland	19 September 1919
—	Holy See	13 March 1920
30	Austria	9 May 1925
31	Luxembourg	23 August 1927
32	Argentina	29 February 1928
33	Finland	7 August 1929
34	Chile	19 November 1935
35	Iran	30 April 1937
36	Brazil	15 June 1938
37	Canada	30 May 1941
38	Syria	26 February 1946
39	Lebanon	18 May 1946
40	Mexico	28 May 1946
41	Pakistan	15 May 1948
42	North Korea	30 October 1948
43	Israel	25 November 1948
44	India	5 December 1948
45	Myanmar	29 December 1950
46	Paraguay	19 February 1951
47	Jordan	25 August 1951
48	New Zealand	September 1951
49	Germany	8 December 1951
50	Ethiopia	4 March 1952
51	Costa Rica	14 June 1952
52	Iceland	27 February 1953
53	Panama	26 March 1953
54	Bolivia	15 May 1954
55	Indonesia	4 November 1954
56	Thailand	12 November 1954
57	Afghanistan	30 December 1954
58	China	2 January 1955
59	Libya	2 October 1955
60	Ecuador	10 January 1956
61	Sudan	14 February 1956
62	Cambodia	15 July 1956
63	Mongolia	20 November 1956
64	Tunisia	13 February 1957
65	Morocco	1 March 1957
66	Vietnam	10 March 1957
67	Sri Lanka	14 October 1957
68	Yemen	28 December 1957
69	Iraq	23 July 1958
70	Ghana	10 January 1959
71	Liberia	15 September 1959
72	Nepal	7 October 1959
73	Guinea	10 November 1959
74	Democratic Republic of the Congo	2 August 1960
75	Central African Republic	August 1960
76	Somalia	8 September 1960
77	Togo	10 September 1960
78	Cyprus	7 October 1960
79	Mali	4 November 1960
80	Nigeria	March 1961
81	Sierra Leone	27 April 1961
82	Senegal	31 May 1961
83	Tanzania	9 December 1961
84	Algeria	2 July 1962
85	Benin	3 July 1962
86	Burundi	July 1962
87	Laos	25 November 1962
88	Kuwait	7 May 1963
89	Uganda	31 July 1963
90	Kenya	12 December 1963
91	Republic of the Congo	28 March 1964
92	Mauritania	12 June 1964
93	Zambia	23 October 1964
94	Cameroon	12 December 1965
95	Gambia	1965
96	Chad	1966
97	Australia	25 April 1966
98	Colombia	20 December 1966
99	Malaysia	4 May 1967
100	Singapore	22 August 1967
101	Ivory Coast	15 June 1968
102	Burkina Faso	8 July 1968
103	Jamaica	13 October 1968
104	Malta	6 January 1969
105	Peru	12 December 1969
106	Equatorial Guinea	18 May 1970
107	Botswana	5 September 1970
108	Mauritius	6 October 1970
109	Madagascar	4 June 1971
110	Rwanda	15 June 1971
111	Bangladesh	22 January 1972
112	Philippines	10 March 1972
113	Niger	17 March 1972
114	Lesotho	25 September 1972
115	Gabon	4 October 1973
116	Trinidad and Tobago	25 March 1974
117	Oman	4 May 1974
118	Guinea-Bissau	10 May 1974
119	Maldives	1 March 1975
120	Mozambique	10 June 1975
121	Angola	12 November 1975
122	Papua New Guinea	21 May 1976
123	Suriname	9 July 1976
124	Fiji	30 July 1976
125	Seychelles	1 August 1976
126	Comoros	24 November 1976
127	Cape Verde	1976
128	Ireland	April 1977
129	Barbados	15 November 1977
130	Grenada	29 June 1978
131	Djibouti	11 July 1978
132	São Tomé and Príncipe	2 February 1979
133	Nicaragua	10 August 1979
134	El Salvador	16 December 1979
135	Zimbabwe	18 April 1980
136	Haiti	20 January 1984
137	Bahamas	July 1988
–	State of Palestine	5 April 1989
138	Qatar	25 August 1989
138	Bahrain	31 August 1989
140	South Korea	27 December 1989
141	Namibia	21 March 1990
142	Eswatini	1 June 1990
143	South Africa	2 April 1992
144	Slovakia	1 January 1993
145	Ukraine	15 April 1994
146	Armenia	8 July 1994
147	Belarus	15 November 1994
148	Uzbekistan	18 January 1995
149	Moldova	15 March 1995
150	Georgia	26 June 1995
151	Tajikistan	9 September 1995
152	North Macedonia	8 April 1996
153	Turkmenistan	26 August 1996
154	Croatia	9 September 1996
155	Kazakhstan	10 December 1996
156	Azerbaijan	21 August 1997
157	Malawi	13 February 1998
158	Kyrgyzstan	25 June 1998
159	Slovenia	9 December 2000
160	Bosnia and Herzegovina	15 December 2000
161	Lithuania	22 December 2000
162	Latvia	19 January 2001
163	Estonia	9 February 2001
—	Sovereign Military Order of Malta	11 May 2001
164	San Marino	3 April 2003
165	Liechtenstein	4 April 2003
166	Montenegro	22 June 2006
167	United Arab Emirates	21 March 2007
168	Monaco	31 May 2007
169	Andorra	1 June 2007
170	Dominica	22 April 2010
171	Saint Vincent and the Grenadines	26 May 2011
172	Brunei	5 December 2011
173	Bhutan	9 December 2011
174	South Sudan	3 January 2012
175	Eritrea	19 October 2012
176	Saudi Arabia	17 April 2013
177	Vanuatu	27 August 2018
178	Antigua and Barbuda	28 September 2018
179	Saint Kitts and Nevis	6 November 2018
180	Palau	7 December 2018
181	Tuvalu	4 April 2019
182	Belize	24 September 2019
183	Nauru	25 September 2019
184	Saint Lucia	13 November 2019
185	Solomon Islands	20 December 2021
186	Timor-Leste	20 December 2021
187	Guyana	22 September 2024
188	Marshall Islands	27 September 2024
189	Tonga	24 September 2026

== Multilateral relations ==
=== European Union ===
Serbian foreign policy is focused on achieving the strategic goal of becoming a member state of the European Union (EU). Serbia officially applied for membership in the European Union in 2009, received a full candidate status in 2012 and started accession talks in 2014. The European Commission considers accession possible by 2030. After initial popular support for country's entry, it has held unfavorable domestic approval with support weakening since 2014. International support for their accession is similarly mixed with concerns over Serbia's claim over Kosovo, regional geopolitical tensions, foreign policy alignment with Russia, and domestic policies.

=== NATO ===
Serbia proclaimed military neutrality in 2007. The relationship between Serbia and the North Atlantic Treaty Organization (NATO) has been regulated in the context of an Individual Partnership Action Plan. Serbia is the only state in the Southeastern Europe that is not seeking NATO membership, having been the target of a 1999 NATO bombing, but also due to the ensuing secession of and territorial dispute with Kosovo, as well as a close relationship with Russia.

== Bilateral relations ==
=== Africa ===
Country	Formal relations began	Notes
Algeria	1962	See Algeria–Serbia relations: Algeria has an embassy in Belgrade.; Serbia has an embassy in Algiers.
Angola	1975	See Angola–Serbia relations: Angola has an embassy in Belgrade.; Serbia has an embassy in Luanda.
Cameroon	1965	Cameroon is represented in Serbia through its embassy in Berlin (Germany).; Serbia is represented in Cameroon through its embassy in Kinshasa (Democratic Republic of the Congo).
Democratic Republic of the Congo	1961	Democratic Republic of the Congo has an embassy in Belgrade.; Serbia has an embassy in Kinshasa.
Côte d'Ivoire	1968	Côte d'Ivoire is represented in Serbia through its embassy in Vienna (Austria).; Serbia is represented in Côte d'Ivoire through its embassy in Abuja (Nigeria).
Egypt	1908	See Egypt–Serbia relations: Egypt has an embassy in Belgrade.; Serbia has an embassy in Cairo.
Ethiopia	1952	See Ethiopia–Serbia relations: Ethiopia is represented in Serbia through its embassy in Rome (Italy).; Serbia has an embassy in Adis Abeba.
Ghana	1959	Ghana is represented in Serbia through its embassy in Rome (Italy).; Serbia has an embassy in Accra.
Guinea	1958	Guinea has an embassy in Belgrade.; Serbia is represented in Guinea through its embassy in Accra (Ghana).
Kenya	1963	Kenya is represented in Serbia through its embassy in Paris (France).; Serbia has an embassy in Nairobi.
Libya	1955	See Libya–Serbia relations: Libya has an embassy in Belgrade.; Serbia has an embassy in Tripoli.
Morocco	1957	Morocco has an embassy in Belgrade.; Serbia has an embassy in Rabat.
Nigeria	1960	Nigeria has an embassy in Belgrade.; Serbia has an embassy in Abuja as well as honorary consuls in Kano and Lagos.
Senegal	1961	Senegal is represented in Serbia through its embassy in Berlin (Germany).; Serbia is represented in Senegal through its embassy in Rabat (Morocco).
Somalia	1960	See Serbia–Somalia relations: Serbia is represented in Somalia through its embassy in Nairobi (Kenya).; Somalia has an embassy in Belgrade.
South Africa	1992	See Serbia–South Africa relations: Serbia has an embassy in Pretoria.; South Africa is represented in Serbia through its embassy in Athens (Greece).
Tunisia	1957	Tunisia has an embassy in Belgrade.; Serbia has an embassy in Tunis.
Zambia	1964	Serbia has an embassy in Lusaka.; Zambia is represented in Serbia through its embassy in Paris (France).
Zimbabwe	1980	See Serbia–Zimbabwe relations: Serbia has an embassy in Harare.; Zimbabwe has an embassy in Belgrade.

=== Americas ===
Country	Formal relations began	Notes
Argentina	1928	See Argentina–Serbia relations: Argentina has an embassy in Belgrade.; Serbia has an embassy in Buenos Aires.
Brazil	1938	See Brazil–Serbia relations: Brazil has an embassy in Belgrade.; Serbia has an embassy in Brasília.
Bolivia	1952	Bolivia is represented in Serbia through its embassy in Rome (Italy).; Serbia is represented in Bolivia through its embassy in Brasília (Brazil).
Canada	1941	See Canada–Serbia relations: Canada has an embassy in Belgrade.; Serbia has an embassy in Ottawa and a consulate general in Toronto.
Chile	1935	Chile is represented in Serbia through its embassy in Athens (Greece).; Serbia is represented in Chile through its embassy in Buenos Aires (Argentina).
Colombia	1966	Colombia is represented in Serbia through its embassy in Budapest (Hungary).; Serbia is represented in Chile through its embassy in Washington, D.C. (United States).
Cuba	1902	See Cuba–Serbia relations: Cuba has an embassy in Belgrade.; Serbia has an embassy in Havana.
Ecuador	1956	Ecuador is represented in Serbia through its embassy in Budapest (Hungary).; Serbia is represented in Ecuador through its embassy in Buenos Aires (Argentina).
Guyana	2024	Guyana is represented in Serbia through its embassy in Brussels (Belgium).; Serbia is represented in Guyana through its embassy in Washington, D.C. (United States).
Mexico	1946	See Mexico–Serbia relations: Mexico has an embassy in Belgrade.; Serbia has an embassy in Mexico City.
Panama	1953	Panama is represented in Serbia through its embassy in Athens (Greece).; Serbia is represented in Panama through its embassy in Mexico City (Mexico).
Paraguay	1883	Paraguay is represented in Serbia through its embassy in Athens (Greece).; Serbia is represented in Paraguay through its embassy in Buenos Aires (Argentina).
Peru	1967	See Peru–Serbia relations: Peru is represented in Serbia through its embassy in Budapest (Hungary).; Serbia is represented in Peru through its embassy in Buenos Aires (Argentina).
United States	1881	See Serbia–United States relations: Serbia has an embassy in Washington, D.C. and consulates general in Los Angeles and Chicago.; The United States has an embassy in Belgrade.
Uruguay	1950	Uruguay is represented in Serbia through its embassy in Bucharest (Romania).; Serbia is represented in Uruguay through its embassy in Buenos Aires (Argentina).
Venezuela	1951	See Serbia–Venezuela relations: Serbia has an embassy in Caracas.; Venezuela has an embassy in Belgrade.

=== Asia ===
Country	Formal relations began	Notes
Afghanistan	1954	Afghanistan is represented in Serbia through its embassy in Sofia (Bulgaria).; Serbia is represented in Afghanistan through its embassy in Tehran (Iran).
Armenia	1993	See Armenia–Serbia relations: Armenia is represented in Serbia through its embassy in Prague (Czech Republic).; Serbia has an embassy in Yerevan.
Azerbaijan	1997	See Azerbaijan–Serbia relations: Azerbaijan has an embassy in Belgrade.; Serbia has an embassy in Baku.
Bangladesh	1971	See Bangladesh–Serbia relations: Bangladesh is represented in Serbia through its embassy in Rome (Italy).; Serbia is represented in Bangladesh through its embassy in New Delhi (India).
Cambodia	1956	See Cambodia–Serbia relations: Cambodia has an embassy in Belgrade.; Serbia is represented in Cambodia through its embassy in Jakarta (Indonesia).
China	1955	See China–Serbia relations: Serbia has an embassy in Beijing and a consulate general in Shanghai.; China has an embassy in Belgrade.
Georgia	1995	Georgia has an embassy in Belgrade.; Serbia is represented in Georgia through its embassy in Moscow (Russia).
India	1948	See India–Serbia relations: India has an embassy in Belgrade.; Serbia has an embassy in New Delhi and an honorary consulate in Chennai.
Indonesia	1954	See Indonesia–Serbia relations: Indonesia has an embassy in Belgrade.; Serbia has an embassy in Jakarta.
Iran	1937	See Iran–Serbia relations: Iran has an embassy in Belgrade.; Serbia has an embassy in Tehran.
Iraq	1958	See Iraq–Serbia relations: Iraq has an embassy in Belgrade.; Serbia has an embassy in Baghdad.
Israel	1948	See Israel–Serbia relations: Israel has an embassy in Belgrade.; Serbia has an embassy in Tel Aviv.
Japan	1882	See Japan–Serbia relations: Japan has an embassy in Belgrade.; Serbia has an embassy in Tokyo and an honorary consulate in Osaka.
Jordan	1951	Jordan is represented in Serbia through its embassy in Athens (Greece).; Serbia is represented in Jordan through its embassy in Damascus (Syria).
Kazakhstan	1996	See Kazakhstan–Serbia relations: Kazakhstan has an embassy in Belgrade.; Serbia has an embassy in Astana.
Kuwait	1963	Kuwait has an embassy in Belgrade.; Serbia has an embassy in Kuwait City.
Kyrgyzstan	1998	Kyrgyzstan is not represented in Serbia.; Serbia is represented in Kyrgyzstan through its embassy in Astana (Kazakhstan).
Lebanon	1946	Lebanon has an embassy in Belgrade.; Serbia has an embassy in Beirut.
Malaysia	1967	Malaysia has an embassy in Belgrade.; Serbia is represented in Malaysia through its embassy in Jakarta (Indonesia).
Mongolia	1956	Mongolia is represented in Serbia through its embassy in Budapest (Hungary).; Serbia is represented in Mongolia through its embassy in Beijing (China).
Myanmar	1950	See Myanmar–Serbia relations: Myanmar has an embassy in Belgrade.; Serbia has an embassy in Yangon.
Nepal	1959	See Nepal–Serbia relations: Diplomatic relations between Nepal and Serbia (then constituent part of SFR Yugoslavia of which it is considered shared successor) were established in 1959.
North Korea	1948	See North Korea–Serbia relations: North Korea is represented in Serbia through its embassy in Sofia (Bulgaria).; Serbia is represented in North Korea through its embassy in Beijing (China).
Pakistan	1948	See Pakistan–Serbia relations: Pakistan has an embassy in Belgrade.; Serbia is represented in Pakistan through its embassy in Beijing (China).
Palestine	1989	See Palestine–Serbia relations: Palestine has an embassy in Belgrade.; Serbia is represented in Palestine through its embassy in Cairo (Egypt).
Philippines	1972	Philippines is represented in Serbia through its embassy in Budapest (Hungary).; Serbia is represented in the Philippines through its embassy in Jakarta (Indonesia).
Qatar	1989	Qatar has an embassy in Belgrade.; Serbia has an embassy in Doha.
Saudi Arabia	2013	Saudi Arabia is represented in Serbia through its embassy in Sofia (Bulgaria).; Serbia has an embassy in Riyadh.
South Korea	1989	See Serbia–South Korea relations: Serbian has an embassy in Seoul.; South Korean has an embassy in Belgrade.
Syria	1946	See Serbia–Syria relations: Serbia has an embassy in Damascus.; Syria has an embassy in Belgrade.
Tajikistan	1995	Serbia is represented in Tajikistan through its embassy in Moscow (Russia).; Tajikistan is represented in Serbia through its embassy in Moscow (Russia).
Thailand	1954	Serbia is represented in Thailand through its embassy in Jakarta (Indonesia).; Thailand is represented in Serbia through its embassy in Budapest (Hungary).
Turkey	1879	See Serbia–Turkey relations: Serbia has an embassy in Ankara and a consulate general in Istanbul.; Turkey has an embassy in Belgrade and a consulate general in Novi Pazar.
Turkmenistan	1996	Serbia is represented in Turkmenistan through its embassy in Moscow (Russia).; Turkmenistan is represented in Serbia through its embassy in Moscow (Russia).
United Arab Emirates	2007	See Serbia–United Arab Emirates relations: Serbia has an embassy in Abu Dhabi.; The United Arab Emirates has an embassy in Belgrade.
Uzbekistan	1995	Serbia is represented in Uzbekistan through its embassy in Moscow (Russia).; Uzbekistan is represented in Serbia through its embassy in Vienna (Austria).
Vietnam	1957	Serbia is represented in Vietnam through its embassy in Jakarta (Indonesia).; Vietnam is represented in Serbia through its embassy in Bucharest (Romania).

=== Europe ===
Country	Formal relations began	Notes
Albania	1914	See Albania–Serbia relations: Albania has an embassy in Belgrade.; Serbia has an embassy in Tirana.
Andorra	2007	Andorra is represented in Serbia through a non-resident ambassador based in Andorra la Vella (at the Foreign Ministry).; Serbia is represented in Andorra through its embassy in Madrid (Spain).
Austria	1874	See Austria–Serbia relations: Austria has an embassy in Belgrade.; Serbia has an embassy in Vienna and a consulate general in Salzburg.
Belarus	1994	See Belarus–Serbia relations: Belarus has an embassy in Belgrade.; Serbia has an embassy in Minsk.
Belgium	1886	See Belgium–Serbia relations: Belgium has an embassy in Belgrade.; Serbia has an embassy in Brussels.
Bosnia and Herzegovina	2000	See Bosnia and Herzegovina–Serbia relations: Bosnia and Herzegovina has an embassy in Belgrade and a consulate general in Novi Pazar.; Serbia has an embassy in Sarajevo and consulates general in Banja Luka and Mostar, with consular offices in Drvar and Trebinje.
Bulgaria	1879	See Bulgaria–Serbia relations: Bulgaria has an embassy in Belgrade and a consulate general in Niš.; Serbia has an embassy in Sofia.
Croatia	1996	See Croatia–Serbia relations: Croatia has an embassy in Belgrade and a consulate general in Subotica.; Serbia has an embassy in Zagreb and consulates general in Rijeka and Vukovar.
Cyprus	1960	See Cyprus–Serbia relations: Cyprus has an embassy in Belgrade.; Serbia has an embassy in Nicosia.
Czech Republic	1918	See Czech Republic–Serbia relations: The Czech Republic has an embassy in Belgrade.; Serbia has an embassy in Prague.
Denmark	1917	See Denmark–Serbia relations: Denmark has an embassy in Belgrade.; Serbia has an embassy in Copenhagen.
Estonia	2001	Estonia is represented in Serbia through a non-resident ambassador based in Tallinn (at the Foreign Ministry).; Serbia is represented in Estonia through its embassy in Riga (Latvia).
Finland	1929	See Finland–Serbia relations: Finland has an embassy in Belgrade.; Serbia has an embassy in Helsinki.
France	1839	See France–Serbia relations: France has an embassy in Belgrade.; Serbia has an embassy in Paris and consulates general in Lyon and Strasbourg.
Germany	1951	See Germany–Serbia relations: Germany has an embassy in Belgrade.; Serbia has an embassy in Berlin and consulates general in Frankfurt, Hamburg, Munich, Stuttgart, and Düsseldorf.
Greece	1879	See Greece–Serbia relations: Greece has an embassy in Belgrade.; Serbia has an embassy in Athens and a consulate general in Thessaloniki.
Holy See	1920	See Holy See–Serbia relations: The Holy See has an embassy in Belgrade.; Serbia has an embassy to the Holy See in Rome (Italy).
Hungary	1921	See Hungary–Serbia relations: Hungary has an embassy in Belgrade and a consulate general in Subotica.; Serbia has an embassy in Budapest and an honorary consulate in Szeged.
Iceland	2000	See Iceland–Serbia relations: Iceland is represented in Serbia through its embassy in Berlin (Germany).; Serbia is represented in Iceland through its embassy in Oslo (Norway).
Ireland	1977	See Ireland–Serbia relations: Ireland is represented in Serbia through its embassy in Athens (Greece).; Serbia is represented in Ireland through its embassy in London (United Kingdom).
Italy	1879	See Italy–Serbia relations: Italy has an embassy in Belgrade.; Serbia has an embassy in Rome and consulates general in Milan and Trieste.
Kosovo	No diplomatic relations or recognition	See Kosovo–Serbia relations: Serbia has not recognized Kosovo as an independent state and continues to claim it as the Autonomous Province of Kosovo and Metohija. It considers the declaration of Kosovo's independence illegal and has vowed since to fight its admission to international organizations.
Latvia	1917	See Latvia–Serbia relations: Latvia is represented in Serbia through its embassy in Athens (Greece).; Serbia has an embassy in Riga.
Liechtenstein	2003	Liechtenstein is represented in Serbia through embassy of Switzerland in Belgrade.; Serbia is represented in Liechtenstein through its embassy in Bern (Switzerland).
Lithuania	2000	See Lithuania–Serbia relations: Lithuania is represented in Serbia through its embassy in Budapest (Hungary).; Serbia is represented in Lithuania through its embassy in Riga (Latvia).
Luxembourg	1927	See Luxembourg–Serbia relations: Luxembourg is represented in Serbia through a non-resident ambassador based in Luxembourg City (at the Foreign Ministry).; Serbia is represented in Luxembourg through its embassy in Brussels (Belgium).
Malta	1969	See Malta–Serbia relations: Malta is represented in Serbia through a non-resident ambassador based in Valletta (at the Foreign Ministry).; Serbia is represented in Malta through its embassy in Rome (Italy) and through an honorary consulate in Valletta.
Moldova	1995	See Moldova–Serbia relations: Moldova is represented in Serbia through its embassy in Sofia (Bulgaria).; Serbia is represented in Moldova through its embassy in Kyiv (Ukraine).
Monaco	2007	Monaco is represented in Serbia through embassy of France in Belgrade.; Serbia is represented in Monaco through its embassy in Paris (France).
Montenegro	2006	See Montenegro–Serbia relations: Montenegro has an embassy in Belgrade.; Serbia has an embassy in Podgorica and a consulate general in Herceg Novi.
Netherlands	1891	See Netherlands–Serbia relations: The Netherlands have an embassy in Belgrade.; Serbia has an embassy in The Hague.
North Macedonia	1996	See North Macedonia–Serbia relations: North Macedonia has an embassy in Belgrade.; Serbia has an embassy in Skopje.
Norway	1917	See Norway–Serbia relations: Norway has an embassy in Belgrade.; Serbia has an embassy in Oslo.
Poland	1919	See Poland–Serbia relations: Poland has an embassy in Belgrade.; Serbia has an embassy in Warsaw.
Portugal	1882	See Portugal–Serbia relations: Portugal has an embassy in Belgrade.; Serbia has an embassy in Lisbon.
Romania	1879	See Romania–Serbia relations: Romania has an embassy in Belgrade and a consulate general in Vršac.; Serbia has an embassy in Bucharest and a consulate general in Timișoara.
Russia	1838	See Russia–Serbia relations: Russia has an embassy in Belgrade.; Serbia has an embassy in Moscow.
San Marino	2002	See San Marino–Serbia relations: San Marino has an embassy in Belgrade.; Serbia is represented in San Marino through its embassy in Rome (Italy).
Slovakia	1918	See Serbia–Slovakia relations: Serbia has an embassy in Bratislava.; Slovakia has an embassy in Belgrade.
Slovenia	2000	See Serbia–Slovenia relations: Serbia has an embassy in Ljubljana.; Slovenia has an embassy in Belgrade.
Spain	1916	See Serbia–Spain relations: Serbia has an embassy in Madrid.; Spain has an embassy in Belgrade.
Sweden	1917	See Serbia–Sweden relations: Serbia has an embassy in Stockholm.; Sweden has an embassy in Belgrade.
Switzerland	1916	See Serbia–Switzerland relations: Serbia has an embassy in Bern and consulates general in Geneva and Zürich.; Switzerland has an embassy in Belgrade.
Ukraine	1994	See Serbia–Ukraine relations: Serbia has an embassy in Kyiv.; Ukraine has an embassy in Belgrade.
United Kingdom	1870	See Serbia–United Kingdom relations: Serbia has an embassy in London.; The United Kingdom has embassy in Belgrade.

=== Oceania ===
Country	Formal relations began	Notes
Australia	1966	See Australia–Serbia relations: Australia has an embassy in Belgrade.; Serbia has an embassy in Canberra and a consulate general in Sydney.
New Zealand	1951	See New Zealand–Serbia relations: New Zealand is represented in Serbia through its embassy in The Hague (Netherlands).; Serbia is represented in New Zealand through its embassy in Canberra (Australia).
Palau	2018	See Palau–Serbia relations: Palau is represented in Serbia through its embassy in Tokyo (Japan).; Serbia is represented in Palau through its embassy in Tokyo (Japan).

== See also ==
- Ministry of Foreign Affairs of Serbia
- List of diplomatic missions in Serbia
- List of diplomatic missions of Serbia
- Serbia in intergovernmental organizations
- Foreign relations of Yugoslavia
