= Serbia in intergovernmental organizations =

Serbia is a member state of numerous international organizations (intergovernmental organizations):

- United Nations (UN)
- Council of Europe (CoE), European cooperation
- Organization for Security and Co-operation in Europe (OSCE), European security
- Central European Initiative (CEI), forum of regional cooperation
- South-East European Cooperation Process (SEECP), forum of regional cooperation
- Central European Free Trade Agreement (CEFTA), trade agreement between non-EU countries
- Southeast European Cooperative Initiative (SECI), security
- Organization of the Black Sea Economic Cooperation (BSEC), political and economic cooperation
- Regional Cooperation Council (RCC), forum of regional cooperation
- Partnership for Peace (PfP), NATO program
- Euro-Atlantic Partnership Council (EAPC), NATO program
- Interpol, police cooperation
- International Criminal Court (ICC), international tribunal
- World Customs Organization (WCO), customs

== See also ==
- Accession of Serbia to the European Union
