= Nepal–Serbia relations =

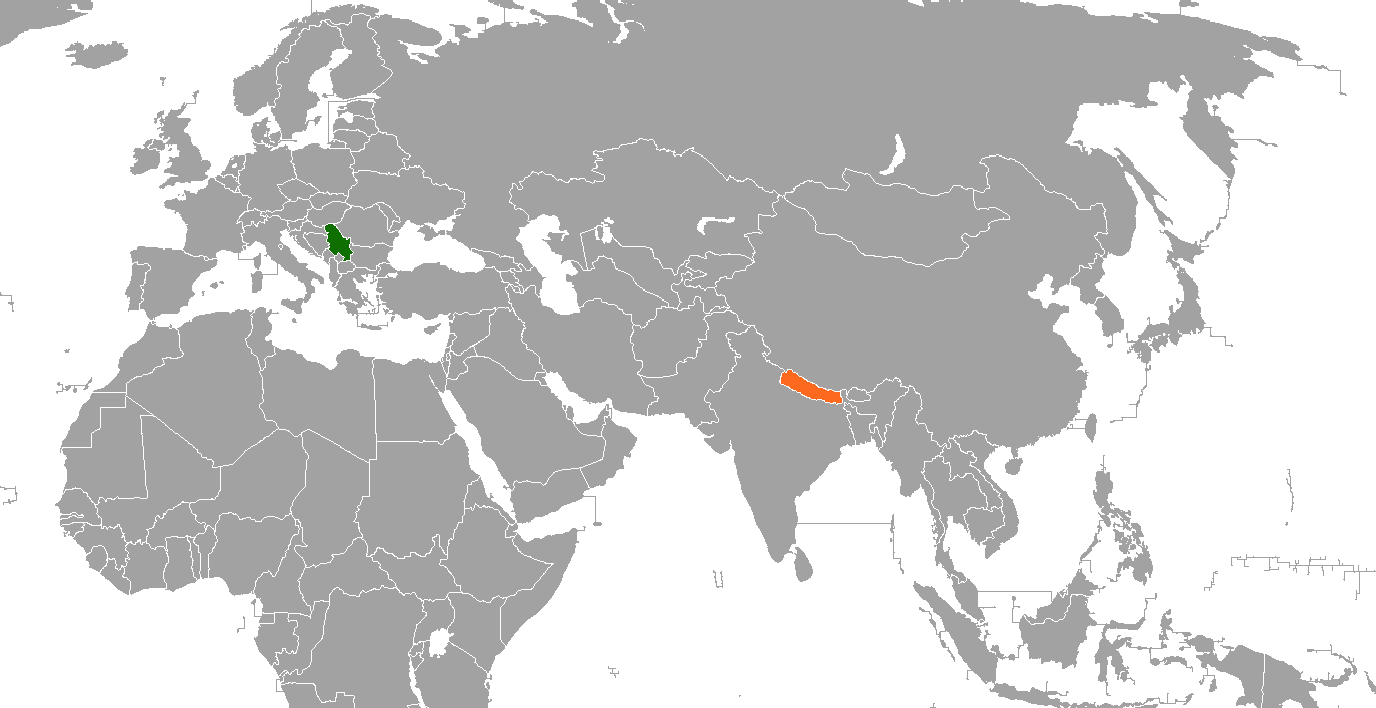
- Serbia: Nepal

Nepal and Serbia maintain diplomatic relations established between Nepal and SFR Yugoslavia in 1959. From 1959 to 2006, Nepal maintained relations with the Socialist Federal Republic of Yugoslavia (SFRY) and the Federal Republic of Yugoslavia (FRY) (later Serbia and Montenegro), of which Serbia is considered shared (SFRY) or sole (FRY) legal successor.

Nepal and Serbia both have a concurrently non-resident embassy. Nepal does not recognise Kosovo, a partially recognised state in Southeast Europe.

== Diplomatic missions ==
- Nepal is represented in Serbia through its embassy in Berlin (Germany).
- Serbia is represented in Nepal through its embassy in New Delhi (India).

== See also ==
- Foreign relations of Nepal
- Foreign relations of Serbia
