= Azerbaijan–Serbia relations =

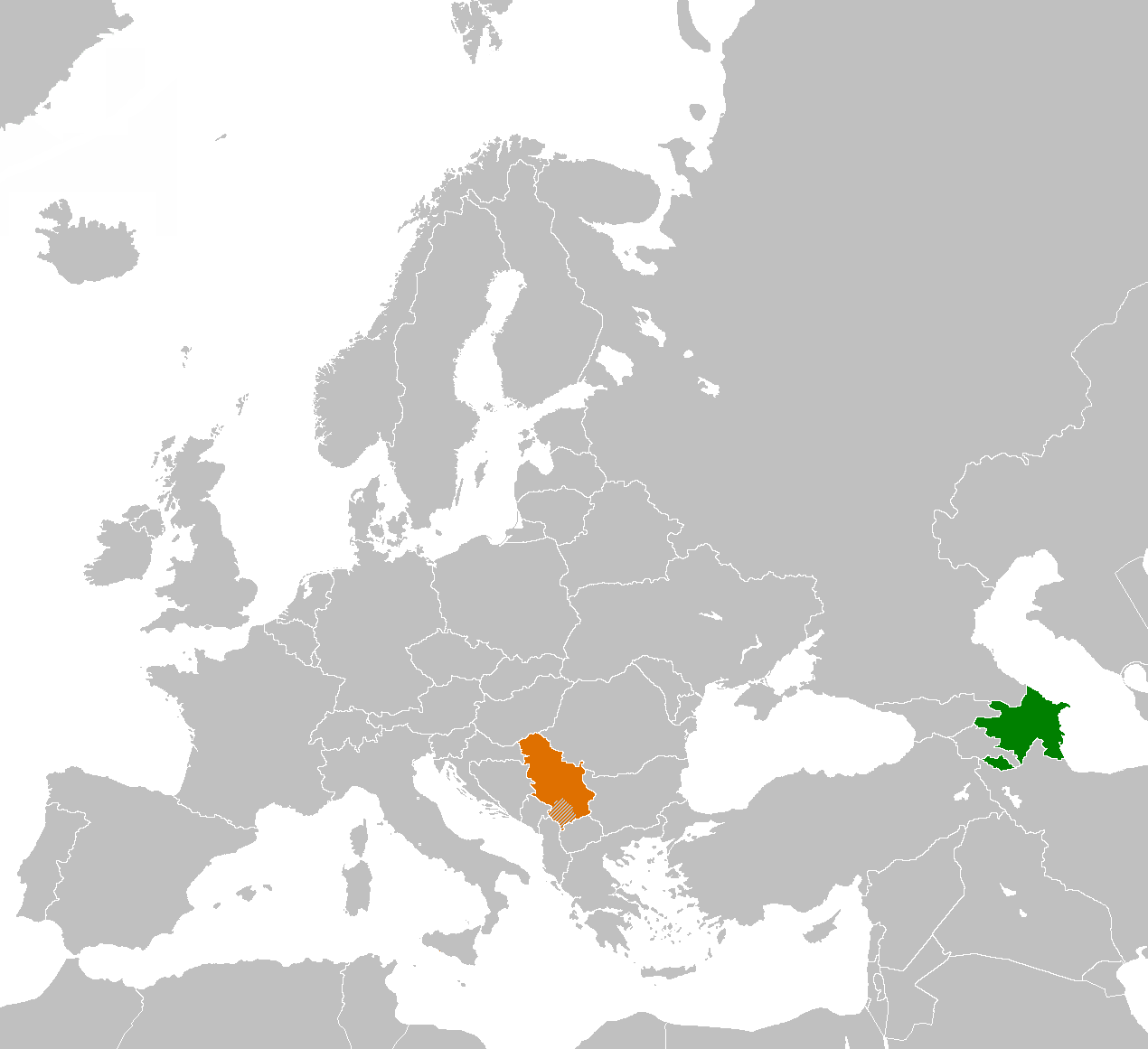

- Azerbaijan: Serbia

Azerbaijan and Serbia maintain diplomatic relations established between Azerbaijan and the Federal Republic of Yugoslavia (of which Serbia is considered sole legal successor) in 1997.

== History ==
The 223rd Rifle Division of the Soviet Army, formed in Quba, Azerbaijan, during World War II, consisting largely of Azerbaijanis and later designated as an Azerbaijani national division, successfully participated in the 1944 Belgrade offensive, leading to the liberation of Belgrade from Nazi Germany.

Both Azerbaijan and Serbia would once again become closer, this time due to ideological connections through communism. In the twentieth century, Azerbaijan was annexed by the Soviet Union while Serbia was a constituent part of Socialist Federal Republic of Yugoslavia.

Yugoslavia recognised Azerbaijan's independence on 31 December 1991, five days after the dissolution of the Soviet Union. Diplomatic relations between Azerbaijan and Federal Republic of Yugoslavia (consisting of Serbia and Montenegro) were established on 21 August 1997. The embassy of Serbia opened in Baku, Azerbaijan, in February 2011, followed by the opening of the embassy of Azerbaijan in Belgrade, Serbia, four months later.

== Political relations ==
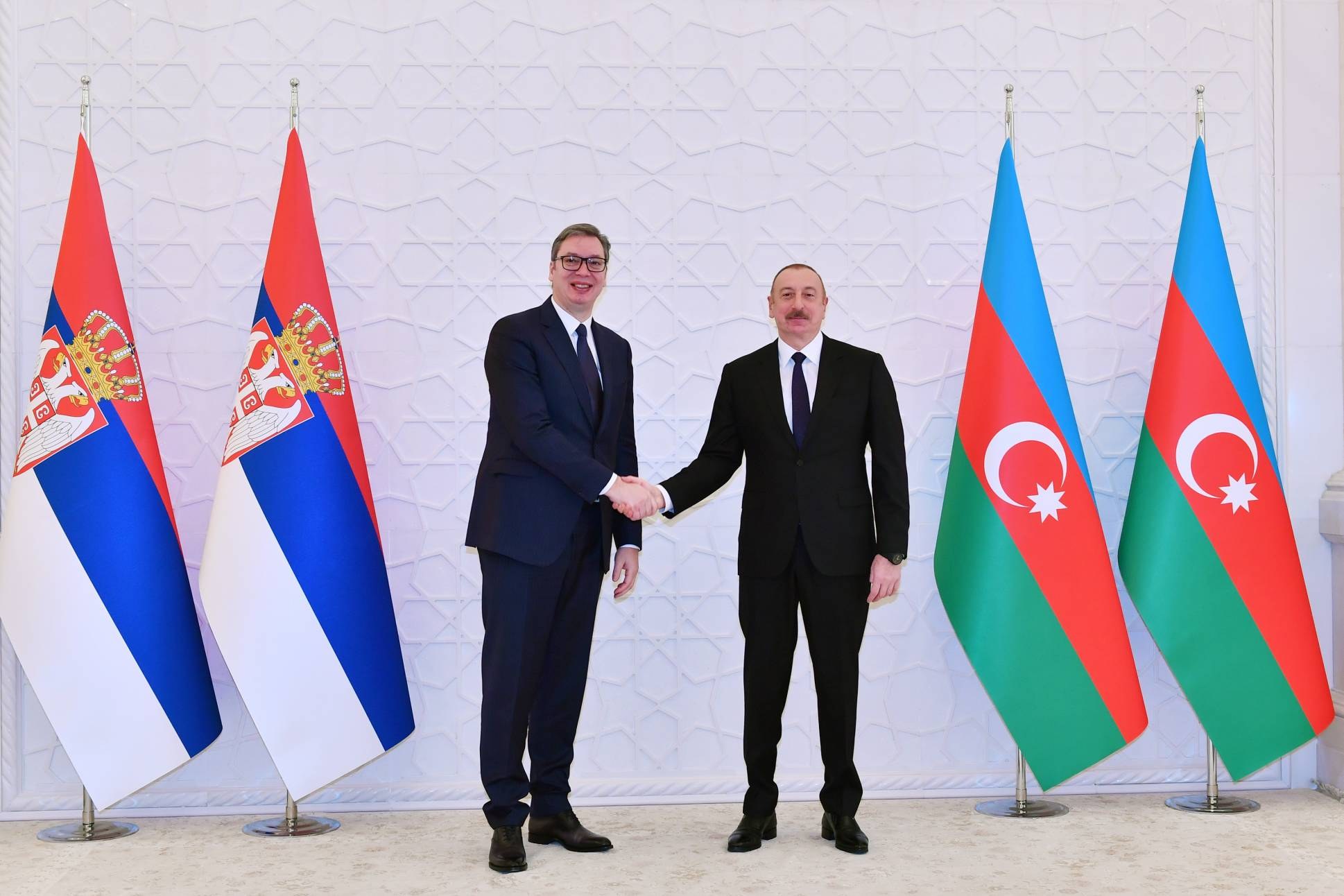
Aleksandar Vučić, President of Serbia, and Ilham Aliyev, President of Azerbaijan, Baku, 2022

Serbia was among the countries that had voted in favour of Azerbaijan in United Nations General Assembly Resolution 62/243 which was a resolution of the United Nations General Assembly regarding Nagorno-Karabakh. In 2023, after Azerbaijan's takeover of Nagorno-Karabakh, Azerbaijan and Serbia reiterated their support for each other's territorial integrity during talks between President Vučić and Azerbaijani Foreign Minister Jeyhun Bayramov in Belgrade.

In 2021, the two countries signed an agreement on mutually cancelling the visa regime.

=== Azerbaijan's stance on Kosovo ===
On the day when Republic of Kosovo official declared its independence from Serbia, Khazar Ibrahim had stated that Azerbaijan "views this illegal act as being in contradiction with international law. Proceeding from this, Azerbaijan's position is clear: it does not recognise Kosovo's independence". Azerbaijan has also withdrawn its peacekeepers from Kosovo. In 2008, Turkey exerted significant efforts at a senior-level gathering of the Organisation of Islamic Cooperation (OIC) held in Dakar, Senegal, to have a strongly worded statement lending support to Kosovo's declaration of independence issued but Azerbaijan was among the countries that opposed the initiative. During the first meeting of Azerbaijan-Serbia intergovernmental commission in 2011, Co-chairmen of the commission Azerbaijan Minister of Economic Development Shahin Mustafayev expressed Azerbaijan's support for Serbia's territorial integrity. Serbia, in return, have stated that they will keep on supporting Azerbaijan's position in the conflict against to Armenia.

=== High level visits ===
Serbian Foreign Minister Vuk Jeremić paid a visit to Azerbaijan in 2009 and President of Serbia Boris Tadić paid an official visit to Azerbaijan in 2010. During his visit, Tadić have visited the graves of Black January victims and discussed bilateral and strategic relations between two countries.

President of Azerbaijan Ilham Aliyev paid an official visit to Serbia in 2011. Aliyev and Tadic unveiled a bust to Uzeyir Hajibeyov in the city of Novi Sad as well as attended the reopening of Tašmajdan Park in Belgrade whose reconstruction was funded by Azerbaijan.

In 2013, the presidents of Serbia and Azerbaijan, Tomislav Nikolić and Ilham Aliyev, unearthed a monument to a Serbian scientist Nikola Tesla in Baku.

Ilham Aliyev visited Niš, Serbia, for a working visit in 2023. During the visit, Aliyev reviewed military equipment, demonstrating an increase in military cooperation between the two countries. This visit also ended up increasing rumours that Azerbaijan was looking to purchase 48 self-propelled howitzers from Serbia. In 2024, Serbian President Aleksandar Vučić confirmed that Serbia signed a new defense contract worth over $300 million with Azerbaijan for Serbian-produced 155 millimetre Nora B-52 self-propelled artillery.

== Economic relations ==
Trade between two countries amounted to $100 million in 2023; Azerbaijan's merchandise export to Serbia were about $69 million; Serbian exports were standing at $31 million. Azerbaijan's export to Serbia includes oil and gas, while Serbia's export to Azerbaijan includes mainly arms equipment.

In 2008, Azerbaijan provided credit lines to Serbia when the latter was hit by a severe financial crisis. The construction of the Ljig–Preljina segment of A2 motorway was completed in 2016 by an Azerbaijani contractor AzVirt and funded by a €300-million loan from an earlier credit agreement. Another contract was signed with the same company for the construction of the A8 motorway (between Ruma and Šabac) and M3 expressway connecting Šabac and Loznica.

In 2023, following pressure from Western countries to join sanctions against Russia, previously Serbia's only gas supplier, Serbia signed a deal with Azerbaijan for the supply of 400 million cubic meters of gas yearly, through a pipeline interconnector with Bulgaria.

== Cultural relations ==
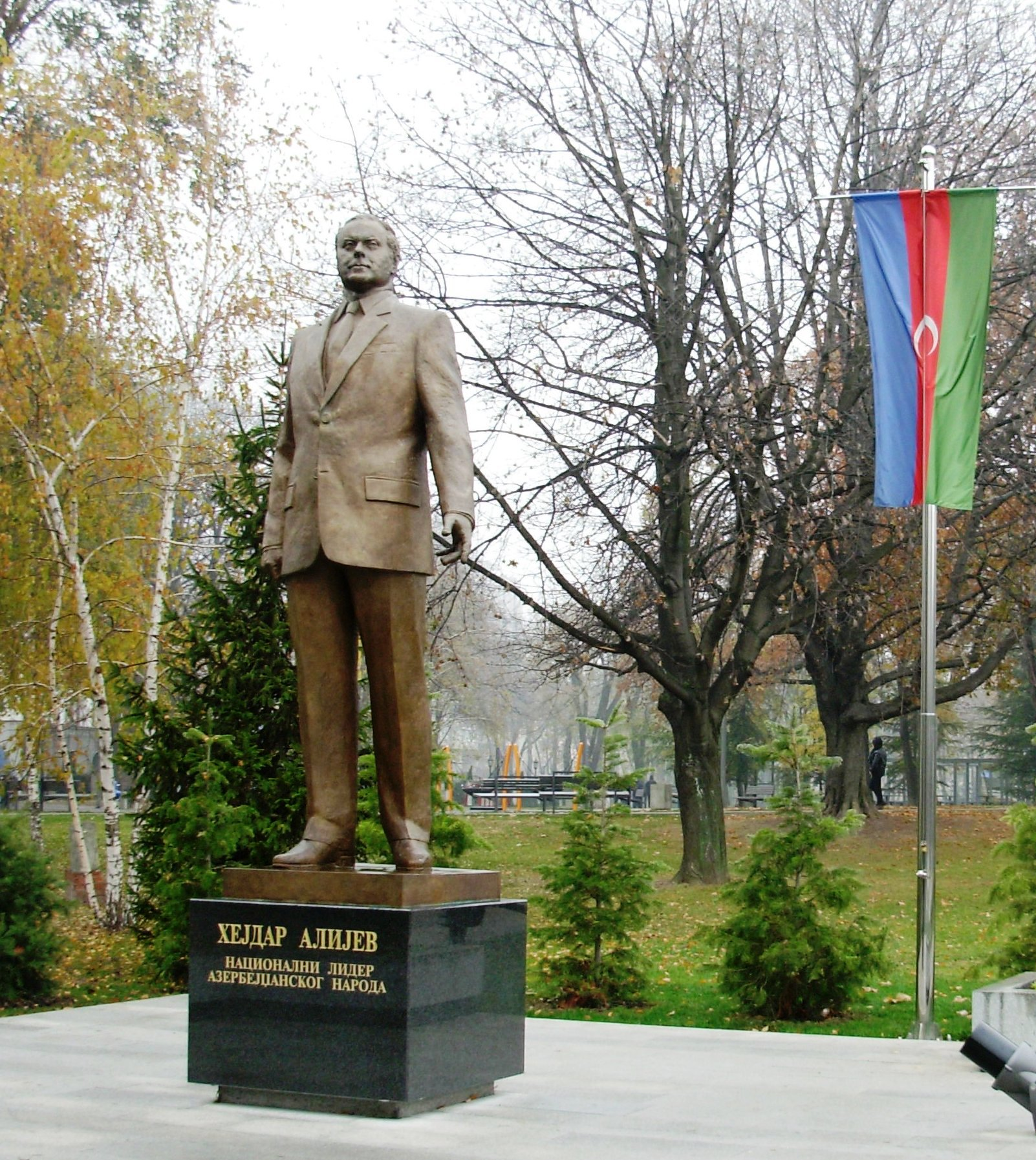
Monument to Heydar Aliyev in Belgrade

In 2011, Azerbaijan funded the restoration of the Bajrakli Mosque in Belgrade, the Church of St. Petka near Novi Sad and Belgrade's Tašmajdan Park. In southwestern Serbia, Azerbaijan financed the reconstruction of a cultural centre in Novi Pazar. In 2023, Novi Pazar was twinned with Shusha, Azerbaijan, in a memorandum signed by heads of the executive power of both cities.

The Serbian Language and Culture Center was established at the Azerbaijan University of Languages in May 2018.

== Resident diplomatic missions ==
- Azerbaijan has an embassy in Belgrade.
- Serbia has an embassy in Baku.

== See also ==
- Foreign relations of Azerbaijan
- Foreign relations of Serbia
- Soviet Union–Yugoslavia relations
