= Potential accession of Serbia to the European Union =

Ongoing accession process of Serbia to the EU

Process of potential accession of Serbia to the European Union
- Status: Candidate negotiating (screening complete)
- Earliest possible entry: 2029–2030
Application
European perspective	21 June 2003
Potential candidate	21 June 2003
Membership application	22 December 2009
Candidate status	1 March 2012
Screened & negotiations commence	25 March 2015
Negotiations
Clusters open	2
Chapters open	22
Clusters closed	0 0% complete
Chapters closed	2^{†} 5.7% complete^{†}Chapter 25 – Science and research and Chapter 26 – Education and culture are provisionally closed. Chapter 34 - Institutions is currently not applicable.
Memberships & Treaties
Association Agreement
1 September 2013
Economic and monetary policy
EU Free Trade Agreement	1 September 2013
World Trade Organization (WTO)	Undergoing accession process.
Euro & the Eurozone	The euro is widely accepted in Serbia, although the official currency is the Serbian dinar
Travel
Schengen visa liberalisation	19 December 2009
Energy
Energy Community	Member since 9 August 2006
Euratom	Serbia is not a member. Serbia does not have any nuclear power, but it does have a moratorium on the development of nuclear energy.
ENTSO-E	Elektromreža Srbije is a member.
Foreign and military policy
North Atlantic Treaty Organization (NATO)	Individual Partnership Action Plan since 15 January 2015 Main article: Serbia–NATO relations
Organization for Security and Co-operation in Europe (OSCE)	1 August 1975 (as Yugoslavia)
Human rights and international courts
Council of Europe (CoE)	since 2003 (as Serbia and Montenegro)
International Criminal Court (ICC)	Serbia and Montenegro deposited their instrument of ratification of the Rome Statute on 6 September 2001. The Rome Statute entered into force on 1 July 2002.
International Court of Justice (ICJ)	Main articles: Bosnian genocide case and Croatia–Serbia genocide case
Impact (27+1)
Population	446,828,803	455,052,321 ▲1.5%
Area	4,233,262 km^{2} 1,634,472 mi^{2}	4,310,736 km^{2} 1,664,385 mi^{2} ▲1.8% (excluding Kosovo)
HDI	0.896	0.890 ▼0.67%
GDP (PPP)	$25.399 trillion	$25.572 trillion ▲0.68%
GDP per capita (PPP)	$56,928	$56,196 ▼1.29%
GDP	$17.818 trillion	$17.256 trillion ▲0.4%
GDP per capita	$39,940	$37,920 ▼5.3%
Gini	30.0	30.1 ▲0.39%
Official Languages	24	25 Serbian ▲1

The potential accession of Serbia to the European Union (EU) is on the agenda for future enlargement of the EU.

Serbia applied to join the EU in 2009 and has been a candidate for membership since 2012 (along with nine other states), while negotiations started in 2014 and are still ongoing.

== History ==
Relations between the European Union and the Federal Republic of Yugoslavia (later the State Union of Serbia and Montenegro) got a fresh start following the overthrow of Slobodan Milošević in 2000, and the EU officially declared the Balkan states potential candidates for membership following the EU-Western Balkans Summit in Thessaloniki in 2003.

On 7 November 2007, Serbia initiated a Stabilisation and Association Agreement (SAA) with the European Union. The SAA came into force on 1 September 2013. The European Commission recommended making Serbia an official candidate on 12 October 2011. The Council of the European Union also made the recommendation on 28 February 2012. Serbia received full candidate status on 1 March 2012. In December 2013, the Council of the European Union approved opening negotiations for Serbia's accession. Serbia officially applied for European Union membership on 22 December 2009 and was granted official candidate status on 1 March 2012. Negotiations on accession to the EU started on 21 January 2014.

Until 2020, Serbia had been receiving €2.9 billion of developmental aid from the Instrument for Pre-Accession Assistance, a funding mechanism for EU candidate countries.

In 2024, Serbian President Aleksandar Vučić stated that Serbia would meet all the criteria to join the European Union by 2026 or 2027, but did not promise an immediate accession in 2026, 2027, or 2028. These statements reflect his earlier ones, when he stated that Serbia would probably have to wait for six years to join the European Union, in 2030. The 2030 target was later supported by the President of the European Council, Charles Michel, during the Bled Strategic Forum, who stated that such enlargement should be ready to proceed by 2030. However, in 2025, during a meeting in Rome regarding the Western Balkans "expansion", Minister of Foreign Affairs of Italy, Antonio Tajani, with the presence of the European Commissioner for Enlargement, Marta Kos, stated that a possible entry year for the nation could be 2029 instead.

=== Chronology of relations with the EU ===
Timeline
Date	Event
1998	The Council of the European Union establishes political and economic conditionality for the development of bilateral relations.
21 June 2003	The Stabilisation and Association Process is confirmed as the European Union's policy for the Western Balkans countries.
October 2004	The European Council conclusions open up a process for a Stabilisation and Association Agreement.
October 2005	Negotiations for a Stabilisation and Association Agreement started.
1 November 2007	Stabilisation and Association Agreement is initialed.
1 January 2008	Entry into force of the Visa Facilitation and Readmission Agreement.
18 February 2008	The European Council adopts revised European Partnership for Serbia.
29 April 2008	The Stabilisation and Association Agreement and Interim agreement on trade and trade-related issues signed.
19 December 2009	Visa requirements lifted for Serbian citizens travelling to Schengen Area.
22 December 2009	Application for Membership in the European Union.
14 June 2010	Ratification process of the Stabilisation and Association Agreement by EU member states started.
31 January 2011	Responses to the European Commission's Questionnaire submitted.
14 October 2011	The European Commission announced its opinion on the Application for membership in the European Union, recommending granting Serbia the status of a Candidate for EU membership.
1 March 2012	The European Council grants the status of a Candidate for EU membership.
28 June 2013	The European Council endorsed the European Commission's recommendation to start membership negotiations.
1 September 2013	Entry into force of the Stabilisation and Association Agreement.
25 September 2013	Screening of the EU acquis started.
21 January 2014	Start of membership talks, first Intergovernmental Conference held.
25 March 2015	Screening of the EU acquis completed.
14 December 2015	Opening of chapters 32 ("Financial Control") and 35 ("Other Issues – Item 1: Normalisation of relations between Serbia and Kosovo*").
18 July 2016	Opening of chapters 23 ("Judiciary and Fundamental Rights") and 24 ("Justice, Freedom and Security").
13 December 2016	Opening of chapters 5 ("Public Procurement") and 25 ("Science and Research"); Chapter 25 ("Science and Research") provisionally closed.
27 February 2017	Opening of chapters 20 ("Enterprise and Industrial Policy") and 26 ("Education and Culture"); Chapter 26 ("Education and Culture") provisionally closed.
20 June 2017	Opening of chapters 7 ("Intellectual Property Law") and 29 ("Customs Union").
11 December 2017	Opening of chapters 6 ("Company Law") and 30 ("External Relations").
25 June 2018	Opening of chapters 13 ("Fisheries") and 33 ("Financial and Budgetary Provisions").
10 December 2018	Opening of chapters 17 ("Economic and Monetary Policy") and 18 ("Statistics").
27 June 2019	Opening of Chapter 9 ("Financial Services").
9 December 2019	Opening of Chapter 4 ("Free Movement of Capital").
1 February 2021	Entry into force of new methodology for membership talks.
14 December 2021	Opening of chapters 14 ("Transport Policy"), 15 ("Energy"), 21 ("Trans-European Networks"), and 27 ("Environment and Climate Change").

=== Common Foreign and Security Policy Collaboration ===
As part (see Chapter 31) and alongside membership talks, despite significant (foreign) policy divergences, Serbia has collaborated with EU actors on Common Foreign and Security Policy (CFSP) and Common Security and Defence Policy (CSDP) issues.

A basis for collaboration in Common Security and Defence Policy issues was established in 2011 with the signing of the "Agreement between the European Union and the Republic of Serbia on security procedures for exchanging and protecting classified information" and the "Agreement between the European Union and the Republic of Serbia establishing a framework for the participation of the Republic of Serbia in European Union crisis management operations". The Serbian Army has since participated in three EU operations EU Training Mission in Somalia (since April 25, 2012), EUNAVFOR Somalia – Operation ATALANTA (since April 6, 2012), and EUTM RCA (Since December 15, 2016). Serbia has also collaborated with the European Defence Agency (EDA), and is one of only five non-EU countries (as of 2026) to have signed an administrative agreement with the EDA. Finally, Serbia has also joined the EU Battlegroup concept, collaborating since 2016 with Greece, Bulgaria, Ukraine, Romania, and Cyprus, under the HELBROC battlegroup.

== Membership talks ==
No further progress on the opening or closing of chapters has been achieved since December 2021. Benchmarks were met for the opening of all three remaining chapters in Cluster 3 (chapter 10, 16 and 19) in December 2024, but this was postponed due the opening being conditional on "substantial further progress made by Serbia, in particular in accordance with...the rule of law (chapter 23+24) and the normalisation of relations with Kosovo".

In June 2026, EU officials had discussed proposals to open Cluster 3 (Competitiveness and inclusive growth) after the Serbian parliament rolled back a series of controversial judicial reforms, but this proposal faced opposition from several member states, most notably the Netherlands, which threatened to veto the opening of the cluster over rule of law concerns.

The results of the 2026 Serbian parliamentary election have given fresh impetus to the prospect of accelerating Serbia's EU integration. The victory of the opposition Student List was welcomed by several EU representatives including President of the European Council Antonio Costa and President of the European Commission Ursula von der Leyen. European Commissioner for Enlargement Marta Kos welcomed the election results and stated "the door to the EU is open."

Ilija Srdanović who headed the Student List's election ticket has stated in an interview with Radio Free Europe that the new Serbian government would remain committed to European integration and work towards aligning domestic policy with the requirements of Chapter 23 (Judiciary & Fundamental Rights) and Chapter 24 (Justice, Freedom & Security).

The Student List's election program included a stated goal to fulfill IBAR requirements.

One of the newly elected Student List Members of Parliament Jovo Bakić has stated there should be a public debate on EU membership in "six months to a year" followed by a referendum on EU membership.

Clusters of negotiating chapters
Clusters	Acquis Chapter	State of Play	Cluster Opened	Cluster Closed
Overview	Overview	22 out of 34	2 out of 6	0 out of 6
Fundamentals	23. Judiciary & Fundamental Rights	Opened	Opened	–
Fundamentals	24. Justice, Freedom & Security	Opened	Opened	–
Fundamentals	Economic criteria	–	Opened	–
Fundamentals	Functioning of democratic institutions	–	Opened	–
Fundamentals	Public administration reform	–	Opened	–
Fundamentals	5. Public Procurement	Opened	Opened	–
Fundamentals	18. Statistics	Opened	Opened	–
Fundamentals	32. Financial Control	Opened	Opened	–
Internal Market	1. Free Movement of Goods	Serbia working on fulfilment of opening benchmarks	–	–
Internal Market	2. Freedom of Movement For Workers	Draft EU Common Position in Council	–	–
Internal Market	3. Right of Establishment & Freedom To Provide Services	Draft EU Common Position in Council	–	–
Internal Market	4. Free Movement of Capital	Opened	–	–
Internal Market	6. Company Law	Opened	–	–
Internal Market	7. Intellectual Property Law	Opened	–	–
Internal Market	8. Competition Policy	Serbia working on fulfillment of opening benchmarks	–	–
Internal Market	9. Financial Services	Opened	–	–
Internal Market	28. Consumer & Health Protection	Draft EU Common Position in Council	–	–
Competitiveness and inclusive growth	10. Information Society & Media	Draft EU Common Position in Council	–	–
Competitiveness and inclusive growth	16. Taxation	Draft EU Common Position in Council	–	–
Competitiveness and inclusive growth	17. Economic & Monetary Policy	Opened	–	–
Competitiveness and inclusive growth	19. Social Policy & Employment	Draft EU Common Position in Council	–	–
Competitiveness and inclusive growth	20. Enterprise & Industrial Policy	Opened	–	–
Competitiveness and inclusive growth	25. Science & Research	Closed	–	–
Competitiveness and inclusive growth	26. Education & Culture	Closed	–	–
Competitiveness and inclusive growth	29. Customs Union	Opened	–	–
Green agenda and sustainable connectivity	14. Transport Policy	Opened	Opened	–
Green agenda and sustainable connectivity	15. Energy	Opened	Opened	–
Green agenda and sustainable connectivity	21. Trans-European Networks	Opened	Opened	–
Green agenda and sustainable connectivity	27. Environment	Opened	Opened	–
Resources, agriculture and cohesion	11. Agriculture & Rural Development	Opening Benchmarks Assessment Report in Council	–	–
Resources, agriculture and cohesion	12. Food Safety, Veterinary & Phytosanitary Policy	Serbia working on fulfilment of opening benchmarks	–	–
Resources, agriculture and cohesion	13. Fisheries	Opened	–	–
Resources, agriculture and cohesion	22. Regional Policy & Coordination of Structural Instruments	Opening Benchmarks Assessment Report in Council	–	–
Resources, agriculture and cohesion	33. Financial & Budgetary Provisions	Opened	–	–
External relations	30. External Relations	Opened	–	–
External relations	31. Foreign, Security & Defence Policy	Screening Report in Council	–	–
	34. Institutions	–	–	–
	35. Other Issues: Relations with Kosovo*	Opened	Opened	–

Screening and Chapter Dates
Progression	34 / 34 100% complete	34 / 34 100% complete	22 / 34 64.7% complete	2 / 34 5.9% complete
Acquis Chapter	Screening Started	Screening Completed	Chapter Opened	Chapter Closed
Overview	34 out of 34	34 out of 34	22 out of 34	2 out of 34
1. Free Movement of Goods	2014-06-17	2014-09-12	–	–
2. Freedom of Movement For Workers	2014-01-23	2014-03-25	–	–
3. Right of Establishment & Freedom To Provide Services	2014-01-30	2014-03-13	–	
4. Free Movement of Capital	2014-10-13	2014-12-15	2019-12-10	–
5. Public Procurement	2014-03-21	2014-05-13	2016-12-13	–
6. Company Law	2014-12-11	2015-02-05	2017-12-11	–
7. Intellectual Property Law	2014-09-24	2014-11-13	2017-06-20	–
8. Competition Policy	2014-03-31	2014-11-05	–	–
9. Financial Services	2015-01-21	2015-03-17	2019-06-27	–
10. Information Society & Media	2014-05-22	2014-07-02	–	–
11. Agriculture & Rural Development	2014-03-18	2014-09-16	–	–
12. Food Safety, Veterinary & Phytosanitary Policy	2014-02-03	2014-10-24	–	–
13. Fisheries	2014-09-30	2014-11-14	2018-06-25	–
14. Transport Policy	2014-12-16	2015-02-27	2021-12-14	–
15. Energy	2014-04-29	2014-06-12	2021-12-14	–
16. Taxation	2014-10-14	2015-03-06	–	–
17. Economic & Monetary Policy	2014-12-02	2015-03-12	2018-12-10	–
18. Statistics	2014-05-20	2014-11-26	2018-12-10	–
19. Social Policy & Employment	2014-02-10	2014-06-26	–	–
20. Enterprise & Industrial Policy	2014-04-03	2014-07-02	2017-02-27	–
21. Trans-European Networks	2014-04-29	2015-02-27	2021-12-14	–
22. Regional Policy & Coordination of Structural Instruments	2014-10-01	2015-01-29	–	–
23. Judiciary & Fundamental Rights	2013-09-25	2013-12-10	2016-07-18	–
24. Justice, Freedom & Security	2013-10-02	2013-12-13	2016-07-18	–
25. Science & Research	2014-10-06	2014-12-01	2016-12-13	2016-12-13
26. Education & Culture	2014-02-20	2014-04-04	2017-02-27	2017-02-27
27. Environment	2014-09-15	2014-11-21	2021-12-14	–
28. Consumer & Health Protection	2014-12-04	2015-02-04	–	–
29. Customs Union	2014-03-26	2014-06-04	2017-06-20	–
30. External Relations	2014-07-02	2014-10-09	2017-12-11	–
31. Foreign, Security & Defence Policy	2014-07-15	2014-10-10	–	–
32. Financial Control	2013-10-17	2013-11-26	2015-12-14	–
33. Financial & Budgetary Provisions	2015-01-27	2015-03-24	2018-06-25	–
34. Institutions	–	–	–	–
35. Other Issues: Relations with Kosovo*	2014-01-22	2015-03-25	2015-12-14	–
Progression	34 / 34 100% complete	34 / 34 100% complete	22 / 34 64.7% complete	2 / 34 5.9% complete

November 2026 European Commission Report
Acquis chapter	Status as of Nov 2026	Chapter Status as of August 2026
Overview	3 chapters with some level of preparation, 2 chapter with some/moderate preparation, 17 chapters with a moderate level of preparation, 5 chapters with a moderate/good level of preparation, 6 chapters with a good level of preparation	12 unopened chapters, 20 open chapters, 2 closed chapters
1. Free Movement of Goods	Moderately prepared	Chapter unopened
2. Freedom of Movement For Workers	Moderately prepared	Chapter unopened
3. Right of Establishment & Freedom To Provide Services	Moderately prepared	Chapter unopened
4. Free Movement of Capital	Moderate / Good	Chapter open
5. Public Procurement	Moderately prepared	Chapter open
6. Company Law	Good level of preparation	Chapter open
7. Intellectual Property Law	Good level of preparation	Chapter open
8. Competition Policy	Moderately prepared	Chapter unopened
9. Financial Services	Moderately prepared	Chapter open
10. Information Society & Media	Moderately prepared	Chapter unopened
11. Agriculture & Rural Development	Some level of preparation	Chapter unopened
12. Food Safety, Veterinary & Phytosanitary Policy	Moderately prepared	Chapter unopened
13. Fisheries	Moderately prepared	Chapter open
14. Transport Policy	Good level of preparation	Chapter open
15. Energy	Moderately prepared	Chapter open
16. Taxation	Moderate / Good	Chapter unopened
17. Economic & Monetary Policy	Moderate / Good	Chapter open
18. Statistics	Good level of preparation	Chapter open
19. Social Policy & Employment	Moderately prepared	Chapter unopened
20. Enterprise & Industrial Policy	Moderately prepared	Chapter open
21. Trans-European Networks	Moderate / Good	Chapter open
22. Regional Policy & Coordination of Structural Instruments	Moderately prepared	Chapter unopened
23. Judiciary & Fundamental Rights	Some level of preparation	Chapter open
24. Justice, Freedom & Security	Some / Moderate	Chapter open
25. Science & Research	Good level of preparation	Chapter closed
26. Education & Culture	Moderate / Good	Chapter closed
27. Environment & Climate Change	Some / Moderate	Chapter open
28. Consumer & Health Protection	Moderately prepared	Chapter unopened
29. Customs Union	Good level of preparation	Chapter open
30. External Relations	Moderately prepared	Chapter open
31. Foreign, Security & Defence Policy	Moderately prepared	Chapter unopened
32. Financial Control	Moderately prepared	Chapter open
33. Financial & Budgetary Provisions	Some level of preparation	Chapter open
34. Institutions	Nothing to adopt	Nothing to adopt
35. Other Issues - Normalisation with Kosovo	No assessment scale	Chapter open
Legend: Well advanced Good / Well advanced Good level of preparation Moderate / Good Moderately prepared Some / Moderate Some level of preparation Early stage / Some Early stage

Report history
Clusters	Acquis Chapter	November 2010	October 2012	October 2013	October 2014	November 2015	November 2016	April 2018	May 2019	November 2020	October 2021	October 2022	November 2023	October 2024	November 2025	November 2026
1. Fundamentals	Public administration reform	-	-	-	-	Moderately prepared	Moderately prepared	Moderately prepared	Moderately prepared	Moderately prepared	Moderately prepared	Moderately prepared	Moderately prepared	Moderately prepared	Moderately prepared	Moderately prepared
1. Fundamentals	23. Judiciary & Fundamental Rights	Considerable efforts needed	Some level of preparation	Further efforts needed	Further efforts needed	Some level of preparation	Some level of preparation	Some level of preparation	Some level of preparation	Some level of preparation	Some level of preparation	Some level of preparation	Some level of preparation	Some level of preparation	Some level of preparation	Some level of preparation
1. Fundamentals	24. Justice, Freedom & Security	Considerable efforts needed	Further efforts needed	Further efforts needed	Further efforts needed	Some level of preparation	Some level of preparation	Some level of preparation	Some level of preparation	Some level of preparation	Some level of preparation	Some level of preparation	Some level of preparation	Some / Moderate	Some / Moderate	Some / Moderate
1. Fundamentals	Economic criteria	-	-	-	-	Moderately prepared	Moderately prepared	Moderately prepared	Moderately prepared	Moderate / Good	Moderate / Good	Moderate / Good	Good level of preparation	Good level of preparation	Good level of preparation	Good level of preparation
1. Fundamentals	5. Public Procurement	Considerable efforts needed	Considerable efforts needed	Further efforts needed	Further efforts needed	Moderately prepared	Moderately prepared	Moderately prepared	Moderately prepared	Moderately prepared	Moderately prepared	Moderately prepared	Moderately prepared	Moderately prepared	Moderately prepared	Moderately prepared
1. Fundamentals	18. Statistics	Further efforts needed	Further efforts needed	Moderately prepared	Moderately prepared	Moderately prepared	Moderately prepared	Moderately prepared	Moderately prepared	Moderately prepared	Moderately prepared	Moderately prepared	Moderately prepared	Moderate / Good	Moderate / Good	Good level of preparation
1. Fundamentals	32. Financial Control	Early stage	Early stage	Considerable efforts needed	Considerable efforts needed	Moderately prepared	Moderately prepared	Moderately prepared	Moderately prepared	Moderately prepared	Moderately prepared	Moderately prepared	Moderately prepared	Moderately prepared	Moderately prepared	Moderately prepared
2. Internal Market	1. Free Movement of Goods	Further efforts needed	Further efforts needed	Moderately prepared	Further efforts needed	Moderately prepared	Moderately prepared	Moderately prepared	Moderately prepared	Moderately prepared	Moderately prepared	Moderately prepared	Moderately prepared	Moderately prepared	Moderately prepared	Moderately prepared
2. Internal Market	2. Freedom of Movement For Workers	Further efforts needed	Further efforts needed	Further efforts needed	Further efforts needed	Moderately prepared	Moderately prepared	Moderately prepared	Moderately prepared	Moderately prepared	Moderately prepared	Moderately prepared	Moderately prepared	Moderately prepared	Moderately prepared	Moderately prepared
2. Internal Market	3. Right of Establishment & Freedom To Provide Services	Further efforts needed	Further efforts needed	Further efforts needed	Further efforts needed	Moderately prepared	Moderately prepared	Moderately prepared	Moderately prepared	Moderately prepared	Moderately prepared	Moderately prepared	Moderately prepared	Moderately prepared	Moderately prepared	Moderately prepared
2. Internal Market	4. Free Movement of Capital	Further efforts needed	Further efforts needed	Further efforts needed	Further efforts needed	Moderately prepared	Moderately prepared	Moderately prepared	Moderately prepared	Moderately prepared	Moderately prepared	Moderately prepared	Moderately prepared	Moderately prepared	Moderate / Good	Moderate / Good
2. Internal Market	6. Company Law	Further efforts needed	Further efforts needed	Moderately prepared	Moderately prepared	Good level of preparation	Good level of preparation	Good level of preparation	Good level of preparation	Good level of preparation	Good level of preparation	Good level of preparation	Good level of preparation	Good level of preparation	Good level of preparation	Good level of preparation
2. Internal Market	7. Intellectual Property Law	Further efforts needed	Further efforts needed	Further efforts needed	Further efforts needed	Good level of preparation	Good level of preparation	Good level of preparation	Good level of preparation	Good level of preparation	Good level of preparation	Good level of preparation	Good level of preparation	Good level of preparation	Good level of preparation	Good level of preparation
2. Internal Market	8. Competition Policy	Further efforts needed	Further efforts needed	Further efforts needed	Further efforts needed	Moderately prepared	Good level of preparation	Moderately prepared	Moderately prepared	Moderately prepared	Moderately prepared	Moderately prepared	Moderately prepared	Moderately prepared	Moderately prepared	Moderately prepared
2. Internal Market	9. Financial Services	Considerable efforts needed	Further efforts needed	Further efforts needed	Further efforts needed	Moderately prepared	Moderately prepared	Moderately prepared	Moderately prepared	Moderately prepared	Moderately prepared	Moderately prepared	Moderately prepared	Moderately prepared	Moderately prepared	Moderately prepared
2. Internal Market	28. Consumer & Health Protection	Further efforts needed	Further efforts needed	Further efforts needed	Further efforts needed	Moderately prepared	Moderately prepared	Moderately prepared	Moderately prepared	Moderately prepared	Moderately prepared	Moderately prepared	Moderately prepared	Moderately prepared	Moderately prepared	Moderately prepared
3. Competitiveness; and inclusive growth	10. Information Society & Media	Further efforts needed	Further efforts needed	Further efforts needed	Further efforts needed	Moderately prepared	Moderately prepared	Moderately prepared	Moderately prepared	Moderately prepared	Moderately prepared	Moderately prepared	Moderately prepared	Moderately prepared	Moderately prepared	Moderately prepared
3. Competitiveness; and inclusive growth	16. Taxation	Further efforts needed	Considerable efforts needed	Further efforts needed	Further efforts needed	Moderately prepared	Moderately prepared	Moderately prepared	Moderately prepared	Moderately prepared	Moderately prepared	Moderately prepared	Moderately prepared	Moderate / Good	Moderate / Good	Moderate / Good
3. Competitiveness; and inclusive growth	17. Economic & Monetary Policy	Further efforts needed	Considerable efforts needed	Further efforts needed	Further efforts needed	Moderately prepared	Moderately prepared	Moderately prepared	Moderately prepared	Moderately prepared	Moderately prepared	Moderately prepared	Moderate / Good	Moderate / Good	Moderate / Good	Moderate / Good
3. Competitiveness; and inclusive growth	19. Social Policy & Employment	Some level of preparation	Some level of preparation	Further efforts needed	Further efforts needed	Moderately prepared	Moderately prepared	Moderately prepared	Moderately prepared	Moderately prepared	Moderately prepared	Moderately prepared	Moderately prepared	Moderately prepared	Moderately prepared	Moderately prepared
3. Competitiveness; and inclusive growth	20. Enterprise & Industrial Policy	Some level of preparation	Moderately prepared	Moderately prepared	Moderately prepared	Moderately prepared	Moderately prepared	Moderately prepared	Moderately prepared	Moderately prepared	Moderately prepared	Moderately prepared	Moderately prepared	Moderately prepared	Moderately prepared	Moderately prepared
3. Competitiveness; and inclusive growth	25. Science & Research	Further efforts needed	Further efforts needed	Further efforts needed	Moderately prepared	Good level of preparation	Good level of preparation	Good level of preparation	Good level of preparation	Good level of preparation	Good level of preparation	Good level of preparation	Good level of preparation	Good level of preparation	Good level of preparation	Good level of preparation
3. Competitiveness; and inclusive growth	26. Education & Culture	Further efforts needed	Further efforts needed	Further efforts needed	Some level of preparation	Good level of preparation	Good level of preparation	Good level of preparation	Good level of preparation	Good level of preparation	Good level of preparation	Good level of preparation	Good level of preparation	Good level of preparation	Good level of preparation	Moderate / Good
3. Competitiveness; and inclusive growth	29. Customs Union	Further efforts needed	Further efforts needed	Moderately prepared	Further efforts needed	Moderately prepared	Good level of preparation	Good level of preparation	Good level of preparation	Good level of preparation	Good level of preparation	Good level of preparation	Good level of preparation	Good level of preparation	Good level of preparation	Good level of preparation
4. Green agenda; and sustainable connectivity	14. Transport Policy	Some level of preparation	Further efforts needed	Further efforts needed	Further efforts needed	Moderately prepared	Moderately prepared	Good level of preparation	Good level of preparation	Good level of preparation	Good level of preparation	Good level of preparation	Good level of preparation	Good level of preparation	Good level of preparation	Good level of preparation
4. Green agenda; and sustainable connectivity	15. Energy	Further efforts needed	Further efforts needed	Further efforts needed	Further efforts needed	Moderately prepared	Moderately prepared	Moderately prepared	Moderately prepared	Moderately prepared	Moderately prepared	Moderately prepared	Moderately prepared	Moderately prepared	Moderately prepared	Moderately prepared
4. Green agenda; and sustainable connectivity	21. Trans-European Networks	Considerable efforts needed	Considerable efforts needed	Considerable efforts needed	Some level of preparation	Moderately prepared	Moderately prepared	Moderately prepared	Moderately prepared	Moderately prepared	Moderately prepared	Moderately prepared	Moderately prepared	Moderate / Good	Moderate / Good	Moderate / Good
4. Green agenda; and sustainable connectivity	27. Environment	Early stage	Considerable efforts needed	Considerable efforts needed	Some level of preparation	Early stage	Some level of preparation	Some level of preparation	Some level of preparation	Some level of preparation	Some level of preparation	Some level of preparation	Some level of preparation	Some level of preparation	Some level of preparation	Some / Moderate
5. Resources, agriculture; and cohesion	11. Agriculture & Rural Development	Early stage	Early stage	Considerable efforts needed	Considerable efforts needed	Early stage	Some level of preparation	Some level of preparation	Some level of preparation	Some level of preparation	Some level of preparation	Some level of preparation	Some level of preparation	Some level of preparation	Some level of preparation	Some level of preparation
5. Resources, agriculture; and cohesion	12. Food Safety, Veterinary & Phytosanitary Policy	Further efforts needed	Further efforts needed	Further efforts needed	Further efforts needed	Moderately prepared	Moderately prepared	Moderately prepared	Moderately prepared	Moderately prepared	Moderately prepared	Moderately prepared	Moderately prepared	Moderately prepared	Moderately prepared	Moderately prepared
5. Resources, agriculture; and cohesion	13. Fisheries	Further efforts needed	Further efforts needed	Further efforts needed	Further efforts needed	Moderately prepared	Moderately prepared	Moderately prepared	Moderately prepared	Moderately prepared	Moderately prepared	Moderately prepared	Moderately prepared	Moderately prepared	Moderately prepared	Moderately prepared
5. Resources, agriculture; and cohesion	22. Regional Policy & Coordination of Structural Instruments	Considerable efforts needed	Further efforts needed	Further efforts needed	Further efforts needed	Moderately prepared	Moderately prepared	Moderately prepared	Moderately prepared	Moderately prepared	Moderately prepared	Moderately prepared	Moderately prepared	Moderately prepared	Moderately prepared	Moderately prepared
5. Resources, agriculture; and cohesion	33. Financial & Budgetary Provisions	Early stage	Early stage	Early stage	Early stage	Early stage	Early stage	Early stage	Some level of preparation	Some level of preparation	Some level of preparation	Some level of preparation	Some level of preparation	Some level of preparation	Some level of preparation	Some level of preparation
6. External relations	30. External Relations	Some level of preparation	Some level of preparation	Further efforts needed	Further efforts needed	Moderately prepared	Moderately prepared	Moderately prepared	Moderately prepared	Moderately prepared	Moderately prepared	Moderately prepared	Moderately prepared	Moderately prepared	Moderately prepared	Moderately prepared
6. External relations	31. Foreign, Security & Defence Policy	Further efforts needed	Moderately prepared	Moderately prepared	Further efforts needed	Moderately prepared	Moderately prepared	Moderately prepared	Moderately prepared	Moderately prepared	Moderately prepared	Moderately prepared	Moderately prepared	Moderately prepared	Moderately prepared	Moderately prepared
	34. Institutions	N/A	N/A	N/A	N/A	N/A	N/A	N/A	N/A	N/A	N/A	N/A	N/A	N/A	N/A	N/A
	35. Other Issues - Normalisation with Kosovo	No assessment scale	No assessment scale	No assessment scale	No assessment scale	No assessment scale	No assessment scale	No assessment scale	No assessment scale	No assessment scale	No assessment scale	No assessment scale	No assessment scale	No assessment scale	No assessment scale	No assessment scale
Legend: Well advanced Good / Well advanced Good level of preparation Moderate / Good Moderately prepared Some / Moderate Some level of preparation Early stage / Some Early stage Legacy evaluations: Further efforts needed Considerable efforts needed

== Main political issues ==
Obstacles for accession include the requirement to recognize statehood for Kosovo, foreign policy alignment with Russia (and, to a lesser degree, China), democratic backsliding, and domestic policies such as rule of law and media freedom. Indeed, the EU Commission "Serbia 2025 Report" explained that while Serbia had technically fulfilled the opening benchmarks for Cluster 3 the "pace of negotiations" would depend on rule of law reforms and the normalisation of Serbia's relations with Kosovo.

=== Democratic backsliding ===
Serbia’s EU accession is hindered by democratic backsliding, including weakened rule of law, media restrictions, and an “illiberal” concentration of power under Aleksandar Vučić, alongside government responses to protests that have raised concerns in Brussels.

==== Electoral Issues ====
Serbia’s electoral framework faced criticism for requiring comprehensive reform. Recommendations from the OSCE Office for Democratic Institutions and Human Rights (ODIHR) remained unimplemented, including measures to ensure voter transparency, campaign oversight, and media independence. A parliamentary working group on electoral reform, chaired by a civil society organization (CSO) representative, failed to reach consensus, leading to the withdrawal of opposition and CSOs by February 2025. Local elections in Zaječar and Kosjerić in June 2025 were deemed "neither free nor fair" by domestic CSO observers, citing a climate of fear, institutional pressure, and heavy police presence. Gender representation in politics remained inadequate, particularly at the local level, despite a 40% gender quota for electoral lists.

==== Parliamentary Challenges ====
The Serbian Parliament faced issues of limited autonomy, infrequent sessions, and lack of genuine political debate. The government dominated the legislative agenda, with nearly all laws proposed by the executive. Plenary and committee sessions were marked by tensions, offensive language, and occasional verbal and physical incidents. The Speaker was criticized for biased responses during debates. In November 2024, 68 acts, including the state budget, were adopted without discussion, and opposition motions to dismiss the Speaker were excluded from the agenda, violating constitutional rules. Public hearings were limited, with only 11 held in 2025 and two in 2024.

==== EU Integration ====
Serbia aimed to meet EU membership criteria by the end of 2026, adopting a revised National Program for the Adoption of the Acquis (NPAA) and a plan for fulfilling EU accession obligations in 2025. However, progress in aligning with the EU acquis was slow, with centralized coordination structures limiting civil society involvement. The Ministry for European Integration served as the focal point for consultations, but the National Convention on the EU (NCEU), a CSO platform, suspended cooperation with authorities in February 2025, citing a deteriorating environment for civil society and lack of meaningful participation.

==== Governance ====
The practical exercise of presidential powers sparked debate, with concerns that the President’s influence exceeded constitutional limits. Following the Novi Sad tragedy, two ministers resigned in late 2024, and the Prime Minister resigned on January 28, 2025. A new government, with no change in political composition or ministerial posts, was appointed on April 16, 2025, including nine women and representatives of national minorities. The autonomy of independent bodies remained limited, with their recommendations often ignored. Local self-government faced challenges, including weak administrative capacity and delays in adopting the Law on Vojvodina’s financing resources.

==== Civil Society ====
Civil society organizations (CSOs) operated in an increasingly hostile environment, facing verbal attacks, smear campaigns, and strategic lawsuits against public participation (SLAPPs). Reports emerged of spyware targeting human rights defenders and journalists. In February 2025, police searched the offices of four CSOs, accusing them of money laundering, an action widely perceived as intimidation. A proposed law on foreign influence agents, though not discussed in Parliament, further threatened CSOs. In response, 29 CSOs withdrew from government working groups, and the Council for Cooperation and Development of Civil Society saw frozen memberships due to inadequate responses to attacks on activists.

==== Security Oversight ====
The parliamentary Committee for the Oversight of Security Services dismissed allegations of excessive measures, such as the use of a sonic device during a March 15, 2025, protest in Belgrade. The civilian security agency (BIA) was reported to have detained and questioned activists during the protests, with claims of an attempted "colour revolution." A law granting access to state security files remained unadopted.

==== Impact and Legacy ====
The 2024–2025 protests highlighted deep-seated issues in Serbia’s democratic institutions, including electoral integrity, parliamentary effectiveness, and civil society freedoms. The government’s response, oscillating between tolerance and repression, underscored tensions in Serbia’s political landscape. The events also strained Serbia’s EU accession process, with calls for more transparent and inclusive reforms to align with democratic standards.

=== Kosovo ===
The biggest obstacle to Serbia's accession to the EU is its strained relationship with Kosovo, which escalated after the 2008 Kosovo declaration of independence. The Serbian government has declared that the status of Kosovo should not be tied to the EU negotiations. In 2012, the EU Enlargement Commissioner, Štefan Füle, denied that the European Union would insist on Serbia's recognition of Kosovo before it can join the organisation.

In 2013, the governments of Kosovo and Serbia completed the Brussels Agreement, which was hailed as a major step towards normalising relations and enabled the start of EU accession talks with Serbia. Later that year, Kosovo's Minister of Foreign Affairs Enver Hoxhaj suggested that the EU should approve the accession of Kosovo and Serbia simultaneously due to concerns that if Serbia was admitted first they could veto Kosovo's membership. However, Serbia's accession negotiations were not halted.

In 2021, the European Parliament adopted a report on Serbia, which, amongst other things, emphasised that the normalisation of relationships between Serbia and Kosovo is "a priority and a requirement for EU accession."

In 2023, Kosovar PM Albin Kurti and Serbian President Aleksandar Vučić both accepted the Agreement on the Path to Normalisation (or Ohrid Agreement) but the agreement still hasn't been implemented.

In 2024, the opening of remaining chapters in Cluster 3 was postponed partially due to "substantial further progress made by Serbia, in particular in accordance with...the normalisation of relations with Kosovo", further evidencing an expectation that the country address the issue as part of accession negotiations.

=== Alignment with the EU's foreign policy ===
Serbia refused to join international sanctions against Russia following its 2022 invasion of Ukraine. In response, the European Parliament passed a resolution that stated in part it "strongly regrets Serbia’s non-alignment with EU sanctions against Russia, which damages its EU accession process".

== Public opinion on EU membership ==
Serbian public support for the country joining the EU has significantly waned over the years, while at the same time leaning toward maintaining strong ties with Russia and China which are seen as reliable allies. Serbia’s EU membership has experienced growing skepticism stemming from slow accession negotiations progress, and the Kosovo dispute.

The European Union's push for Serbia to normalize relations with Kosovo, which is seen in Serbia as including implicit recognition, in particular is a major factor contributing to waning support. The vast majority of the Serbian public view Kosovo as an integral part of Serbia, and the EU’s stance is seen as pressuring Serbia to relinquish its sovereignty. Russia and China’s support for Serbia’s position on Kosovo (non-recognition) bolsters their favorability over the EU.

The most recent poll, from March 2025, found that if a referendum on joining the EU took place, 38.9% would vote in favour of joining the EU, with 43.2% voting against, and 17.9% unsure or abstaining.

According to the 2025 annual survey of opinion in Serbia, 38% of citizens have a positive attitude towards the EU (11% very positive, 27% fairly positive), while trust in the EU is 38%. It is also revealed that 33% of citizens would vote in favour of Serbia's membership of the EU if a referendum was held, while 41% of citizens believe that EU membership would bring more advantages than disadvantages.

Data by the Serbian Ministry of European Integration
Date	Question	Yes	No	Undecided
2002	Join EU?	68%	13%	19%
2003	Join EU?	72%	8%	20%
2004	Join EU?	71%	12%	17%
2005	Join EU?	64%	12%	24%
2006	Join EU?	70%	12%	18%
2007	Join EU?	69%	15%	15%
2008	Join EU?	61%	13%	26%
2009	Join EU?	65%	14%	21%
2010	Join EU?	57%	18%	25%
2011	Join EU?	51%	28%	21%
2012	Join EU?	41%	31%	27%
2013	Join EU?	51%	22%	27%
2014	Join EU?	44%	25%	31%
2015	Join EU?	48%	28%	24%
2016	Join EU?	47%	29%	24%
2017	Join EU?	52%	24%	24%
2018	Join EU?	55%	25%	20%
2019	Join EU?	54%	24%	22%
2022	Join EU?	43%	32%	25%

Date	Agency	Question	Yes	No	Undecided
2008	Strategic Marketing	How would you vote on a referendum on joining EU?	61%	–	–
2010	Gallup Balkan Monitor	Do you support accession of Serbia to EU?	63%	–	–
2011	NSPM	Do you support accession of Serbia to EU?	49.7%	37.6%	12.7%
2012	B92/Ipsos Strategic Marketing	How would you vote on a referendum on joining EU?	49%	34%	5%
2013	Ipsos Strategic Marketing	Do you support accession of Serbia to EU?	53%	–	–
2014	Eurobarometer	Do you support the enlargement of EU?	58%	26%	16%
2015	NSPM	Do you support accession of Serbia to EU?	46.8%	31.5%	11.7%
2016	NSPM	Do you support accession of Serbia to EU?	44.5%	43.0%	12.5%
2017	NSPM	Do you support accession of Serbia to EU?	51.2%	36.3%	12.5%
2018	NSPM	Do you support accession of Serbia to EU?	46.5%	38.7%	14.8%
2019	NSPM	Do you support accession of Serbia to EU?	47.1%	34.9%	18.0%
2021	NSPM	Do you support accession of Serbia to EU?	42.7%	38.9%	18.4%
2022	Ipsos	How would you vote on a referendum on joining EU?	35%	44%	21%
2023	Smart Plus	How would you vote on a referendum on joining EU?	44%	30%	15%
2023	Demostat	How would you vote on a referendum on joining EU?	39.76%	39.76%	20.48%
2024	NSPM	Do you support accession of Serbia to EU?	42.8%	36.8%	20.4%
2025	NSPM	How would you vote on a referendum on joining EU?	41.1%	39.8%	19.1%
2026	Ninamedia	How would you vote on a referendum on joining EU?	45%	32%	23%
2026	NSPM	How would you vote on a referendum on joining EU?	47.1%	42.9%	10%

== Bilateral relations with EU member states ==
- Austria
- Belgium
- Bulgaria
- Croatia
- Cyprus
- Czech Republic
- Denmark
- Estonia
- Finland
- France
- Germany
- Greece
- Hungary
- (Republic of Ireland) Ireland
- Italy
- Latvia
- Lithuania
- Luxembourg
- Malta
- Netherlands
- Poland
- Portugal
- Romania
- Slovakia
- Slovenia
- Spain
- Sweden

== See also ==
- Accession of Albania to the European Union
- Accession of Bosnia and Herzegovina to the European Union
- Accession of Kosovo to the European Union
- Accession of Montenegro to the European Union
- Accession of North Macedonia to the European Union
- Yugoslavia–European Communities relations
- Central European Free Trade Agreement
- Open Balkan
- Craiova Group
