= Serbia–Somalia relations =

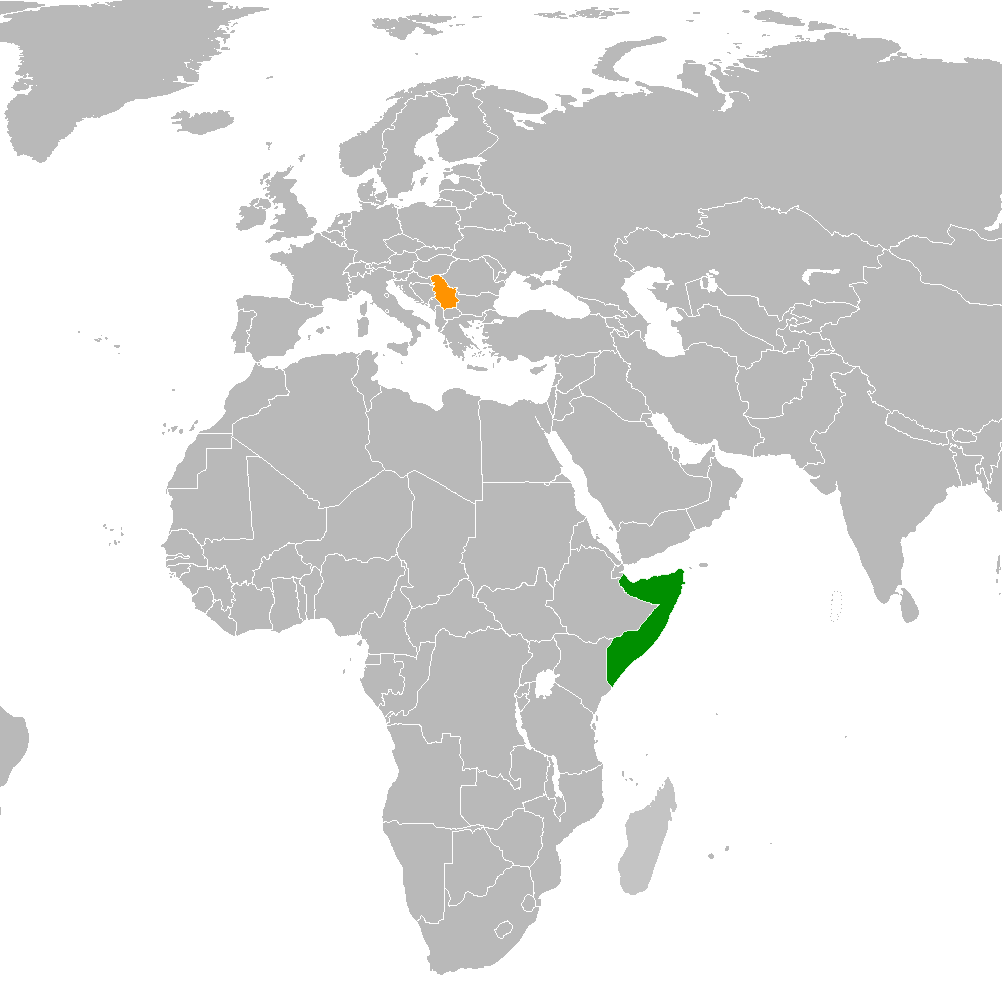
- Somalia: Serbia

Serbia and Somalia maintain diplomatic relations established between Somalia and SFR Yugoslavia in 1960, following Somalia's independence. From 1960 to 2006, Somalia maintained relations with the Socialist Federal Republic of Yugoslavia (SFRY) and the Federal Republic of Yugoslavia (FRY) (later Serbia and Montenegro), of which Serbia is considered shared (SFRY) or sole (FRY) legal successor.

== History ==
Yugoslavia formerly had an embassy in Mogadishu, and there is archived correspondence between the Yugoslav embassies in Mogadishu and Addis Ababa, Ethiopia in 1975, regarding the relations between the Soviet Union, Ethiopia, and Somalia; a situation that became the Ogaden War shortly afterwards, in 1977.

In 2015, Serbia appointed its first ambassador to Somalia, since the breakup of Yugoslavia and the Somali Civil War, both of which began in 1991. Both parties announced plans for cooperation in the areas of development and vocational training for Somalia's youth, as well as agriculture, science, and health sectors. In 2021, Somalia re-opened an embassy in Belgrade. Serbia has a non resident ambassador in Nairobi.

== See also ==
- Foreign relations of Serbia
- Foreign relations of Somalia
- Yugoslavia and the Non-Aligned Movement
- Yugoslavia and the Organisation of African Unity
