= Kazakhstan–Serbia relations =

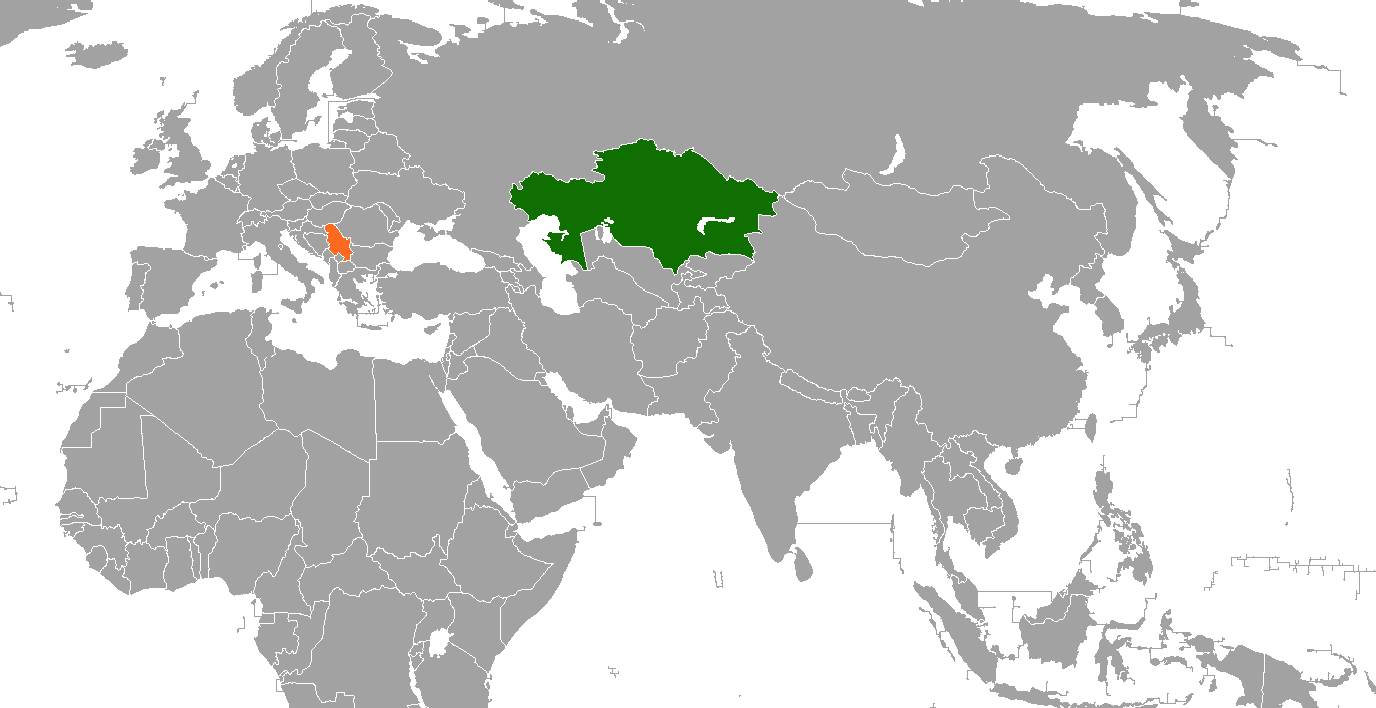

- Kazakhstan: Serbia

Kazakhstan and Serbia maintain diplomatic relations established between Kazakhstan and the Federal Republic of Yugoslavia (of which Serbia is considered sole legal successor) in 1996.

== History ==
Relations between the two nations first commenced when Kazakhstan was a constituent republic of the Soviet Union, the Kazakh Soviet Socialist Republic, and Serbia was a constituent republic of Yugoslavia, the Socialist Republic of Serbia. Following the Tito–Stalin split in 1948, relations between the two communist countries were strained, but were reconciled after Joseph Stalin's death and the signing of the Belgrade declaration by Nikita Khrushchev and Tito on 2 June 1955, marking the end of the Informbiro period.

Relations between the newly independent Republic of Kazakhstan and the Federal Republic of Yugoslavia, which would later become the State Union of Serbia and Montenegro, were first established on 10 December 1996.

The first official state visit of a Serbian President to Kazakhstan was conducted from 6–7 October 2010 by Boris Tadić. On that occasion, Serbia and Kazakhstan signed a free trade agreement and an agreement on the abolishment of visa requirements between the two countries. Tadić was in Astana on the 1st and 2 December 2010 for the OSCE Summit.

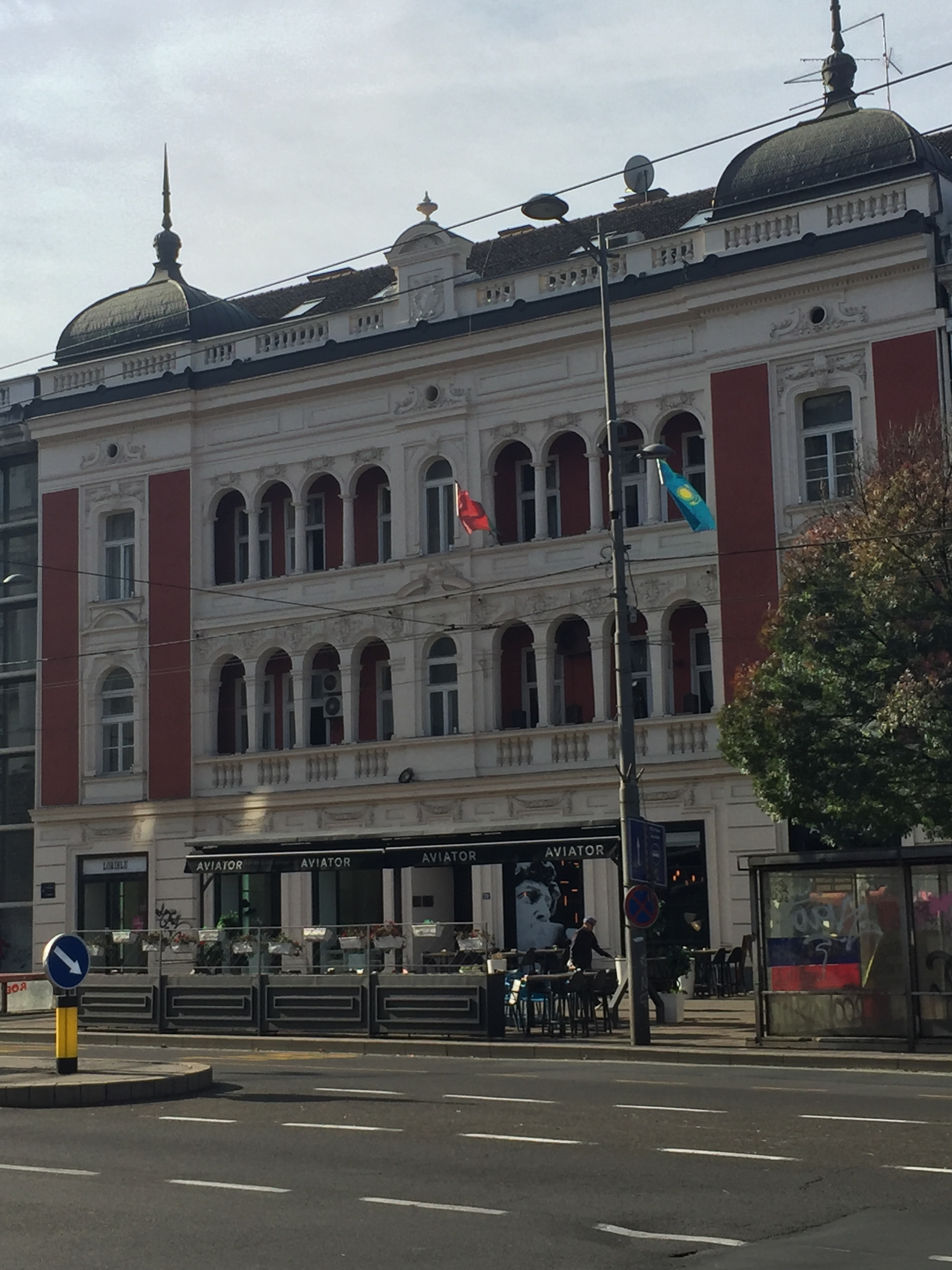
Kazakhstani honorary consulate in Belgrade

On 27 June 2011 Serbia opened an embassy in Astana. The ceremony was attended by state secretary in the Serbian Foreign Ministry Ivan Mrkić and Kazakh Foreign Minister Yerzhan Kazykhanov.

In early June 2015 Kazakhstan opened a consulate of its Hungarian embassy in Belgrade, and named Milanka Karić honorary consul of Kazakhstan to Serbia.

From 27 to 29 August 2015, Serbian President Tomislav Nikolić visited Kazakhstan. Regarding the visit he stated, “We started an official visit to Kazakhstan today with a clear wish to see our friendship, which has been there between our people for a very long time and which is firm and stable, further strengthened by good economic relations, and to find not only investors for Serbia, but also a market for Serbian producers in Kazakhstan.”

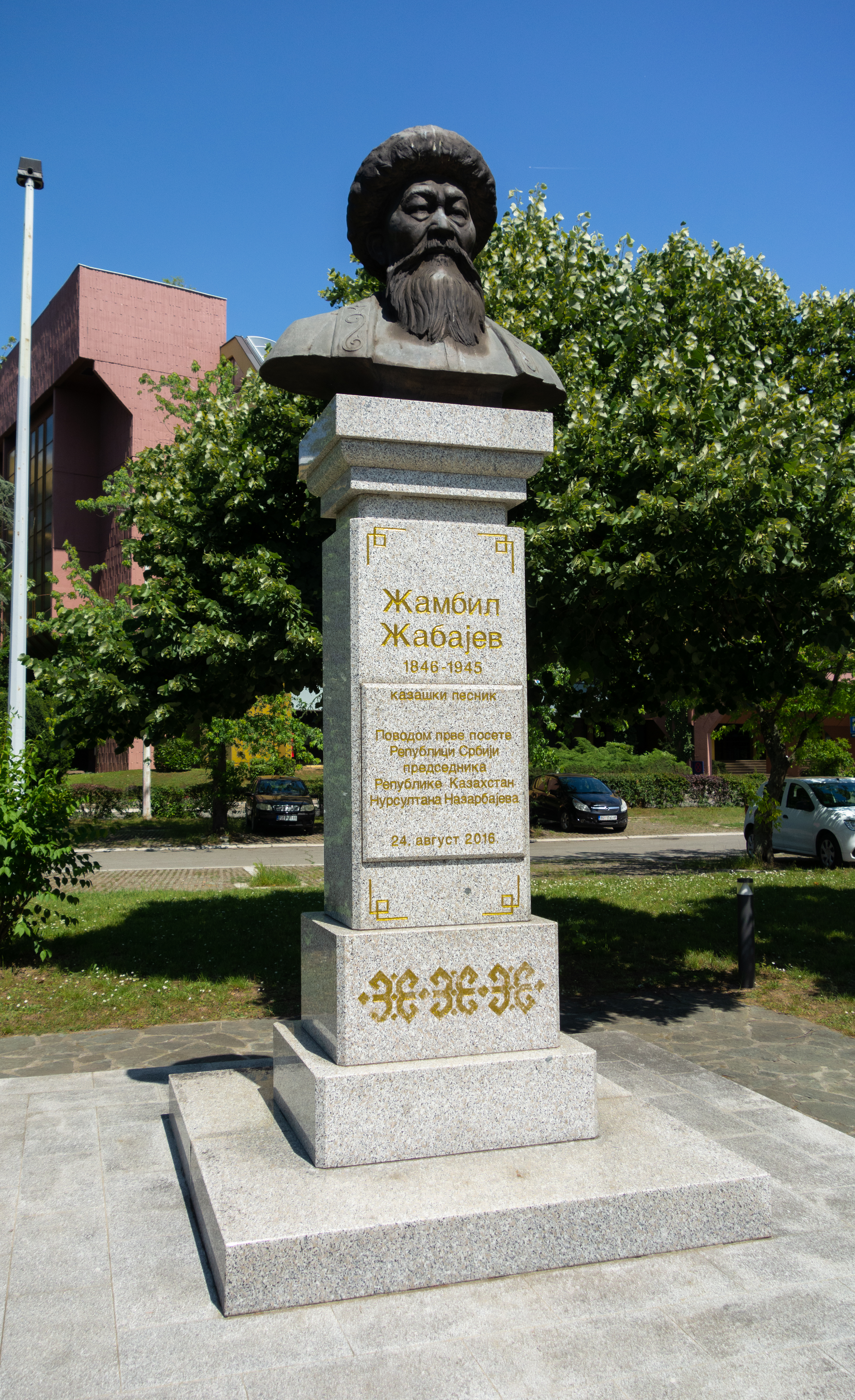
Bust of Jambyl Jabayev in Belgrade

In February 2016 Dragomir Karić was awarded with a medal from the Republic of Kazakhstan for his outstanding work concerning the relations of the two countries.

Kazakh President Nursultan Nazarbayev paid the first official visit of a Kazakh head of state to Belgrade from 23 to 25 August 2016. Nazarbayev met with President Nikolić and Prime Minister Aleksandar Vučić and a deal was signed on the tax-free export of Fiat automobiles produced in Serbia to Kazakhstan, and Tomislav Nikolić was awarded the Kazakh Order of Friendship 1st class. President Nazarbayev voiced support for a free trade deal between Serbia and the Eurasian Union. A ceremony was held during which a bust of Kazakh poet Jambyl Jabayev was uncovered in New Belgrade near the firm Energoprojekt, and a group of Kazakh singers performed the song Luckasta si ti by Miroslav Ilić.

Serbian Prime Minister Vučić was in Astana 14–16 November 2016 and inaugurated a street named after Serbian-American inventor Nikola Tesla on the left bank of the Ishim River. The ceremony was attended by the Mayor of Astana Asset Issekeshev who spoke to the crowd about the Jabayev Monument opened earlier in Belgrade.

Serbian President Aleksandar Vučić was in Astana in June 2017 and intended to visit the Expo 2017 but had to cut the visit short, as his wife Tamara went into labor on 9 June.

From 8–10 October 2018, President Vučić, as well as five ministers and the Mayors of Belgrade and Novi Sad paid an official visit to Astana. Vučić was awarded the Order of Friendship 1st class by President Nazarbayev, and Nazarbayev was awarded the Order of the Republic of Serbia 1st class by Vučić. Vučić asked Kazakhstan to open an embassy in Serbia. On 9 October Vučić, Dragomir Karić and Kazakh Prime Minister Bakhytzhan Sagintayev inaugurated the construction of BK Tesla Park Astana, a 21 hectare housing project located between Uly Dala Avenue and the Telman Township in Astana. The project is worth around 500 mil. US dollars, and is expected to be built between 2018 and 2023 by the BK group founded by Dragomir's brother, Bogoljub Karić.

President of Kazakhstan, Kassym-Jomart Tokayev, visited Serbia on 18-19 November 2024.

== Kazakhstan's stance on Kosovo ==
Kazakhstan has vehemently opposed the independence of Kosovo and has taken Serbia's position on the issue. In December 2008, Kazakh Prime Minister Karim Masimov stated that "We have an official position. Kazakhstan did not recognize Kosovo and does not recognize Abkhazia and South Ossetia. We consider that borders are defined and Kazakhstan will not recognize any new states".

== Resident diplomatic missions ==
- Kazakhstan has an embassy in Belgrade.
- Serbia has an embassy in Astana.

== See also ==
- Foreign relations of Kazakhstan
- Foreign relations of Serbia
- Soviet Union–Yugoslavia relations
