= San Marino–Serbia relations =

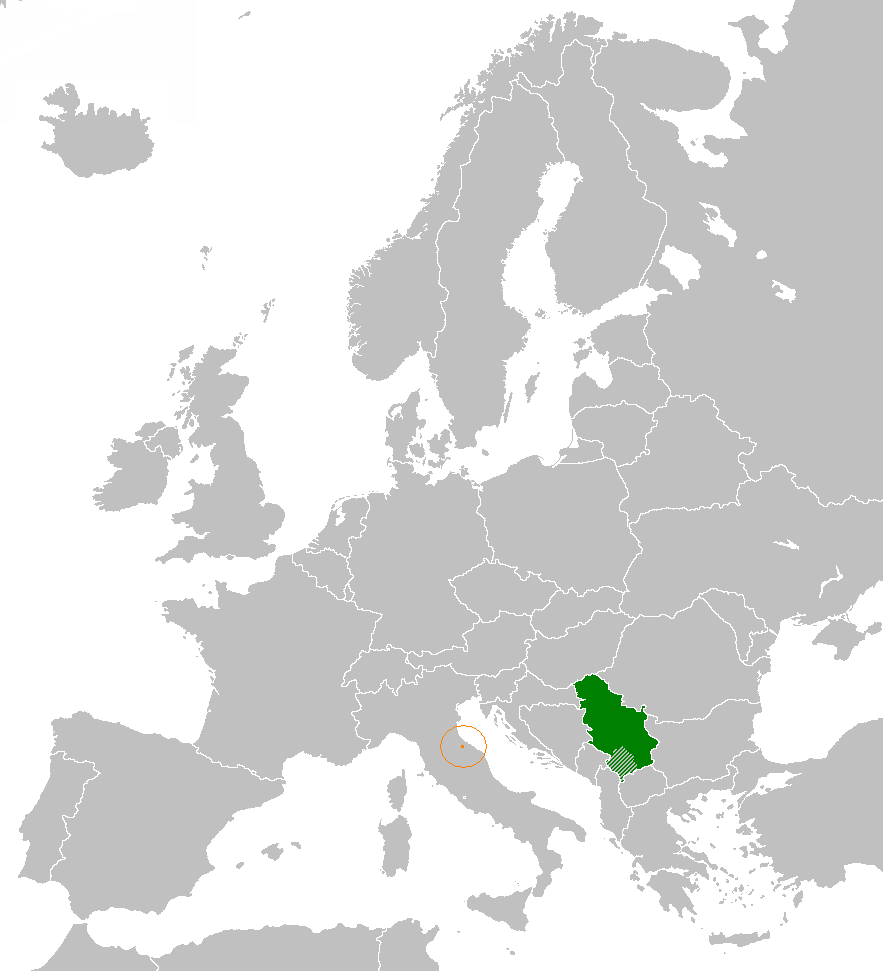
- Serbia: San Marino

San Marino and Serbia maintain diplomatic relations established between San Marino and the Federal Republic of Yugoslavia (of which Serbia is considered sole legal successor) in 2002.

== History ==
Yugoslavia and San Marino signed the Agreement on the Establishment of Consular Relations by an exchange of Notes in 1961. According to the Agreement, a senior diplomat in the Embassy of the SFR Yugoslavia in Rome was designated as Consul-General to the Republic of San Marino.

The Captains Regent paid a visit to Yugoslavia in 1984. San Marino's Foreign Minister Fabio Berardi visited Belgrade in 2005 where he met with President Boris Tadić, Prime Minister Vojislav Koštunica and Foreign Minister Vuk Drašković. During the visit, Berardi promised that San Marino will support all Serbia's requests in the Council of Europe, during its chairmanship, regarding urge for the affirmation of dialogue and territorial sovereignty of Serbia.

In 2008, after Kosovo declared its independence, San Marino Foreign Ministry stated that San Marino recognises the right to self-determination but that it also believes that "the Helsinki Final Act plays an important part of the precious equilibrium". The statement pointed at the problem of ethnic hatred in the area of former Yugoslavia. San Marino did not wish to rekindle ethnic and religious conflicts by recognizing Kosovo as an independent state, although it believed that all the people of Kosovo need to be supported by international solidarity. San Marino supports the continued presence of the Organization for Security and Co-operation in Europe (OSCE) on Kosovo and would wait with the decision on recognition until the status of Kosovo is resolved through dialogue of both sides under the supervision of United Nations, so that both sides can count on international impartiality of judgement. Despite this, San Marino recognized the independence of Kosovo on 11 May 2008.

== Resident diplomatic missions ==
- San Marino has an embassy in Belgrade.
- Serbia is accredited to San Marino through its embassy in Rome, Italy.

== See also ==
- Foreign relations of San Marino
- Foreign relations of Serbia
