= Denmark–Serbia relations =

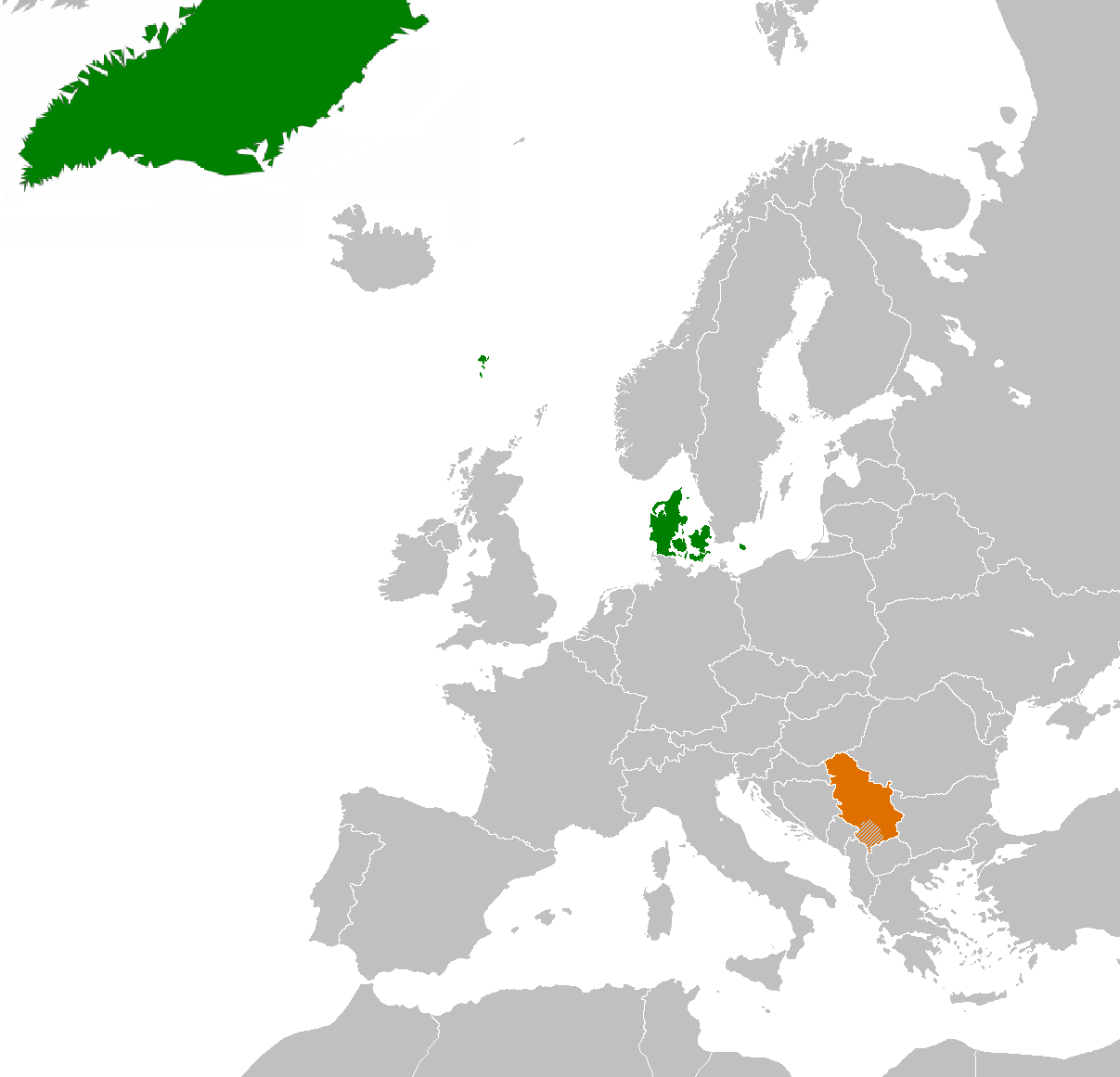
- Denmark: Serbia

Denmark and Serbia maintain diplomatic relations established in 1917. From 1918 to 2006, Denmark maintained relations with the Kingdom of Yugoslavia, the Socialist Federal Republic of Yugoslavia (SFRY), and the Federal Republic of Yugoslavia (FRY) (later Serbia and Montenegro), of which Serbia is considered shared (SFRY) or sole (FRY) legal successor.

== Economic relations ==
Trade between two countries amounted to $370 million in 2023; Denmark's merchandise export to Serbia were about $296 million; Serbia's exports were standing at roughly $73 million.

Major Danish companies present in Serbia include Carlsberg (owner of the Čelarevo Brewery in Bačka Palanka, known by its signature brand Lav pivo) and Grundfos (pump manufacturing plant in Inđija). Denmark's largest international retailer, Jysk, operates 47 stores in Serbia.

== Immigration from Serbia ==
According to data from 2024 data, there were 1,218 Serbian nationals in Denmark. This figure includes 2,613 immigrants and 1,336 descendants.

== Resident diplomatic missions ==
- Denmark has an embassy in Belgrade.
- Serbia has an embassy in Copenhagen.
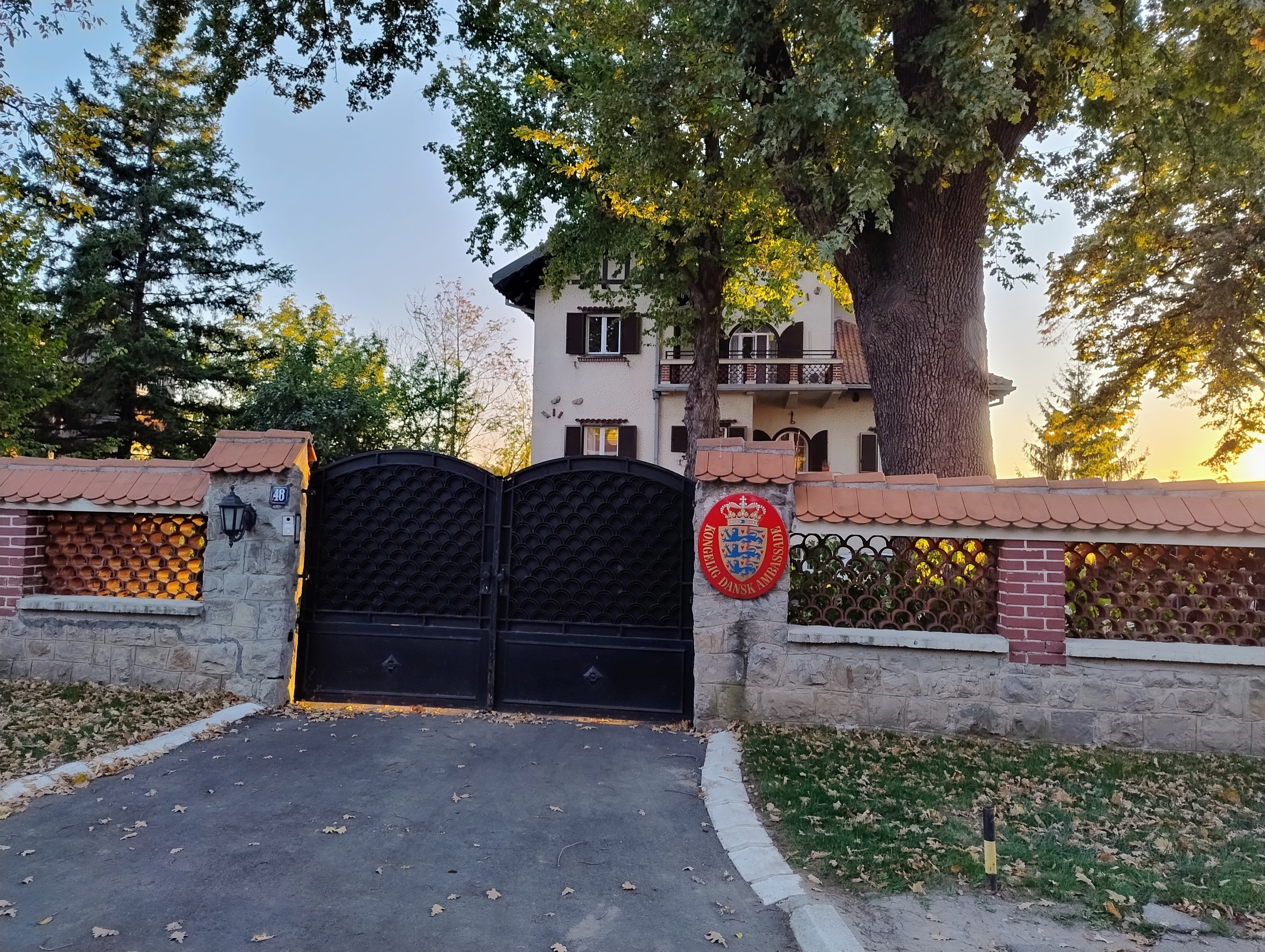
Embassy of Denmark in Belgrade

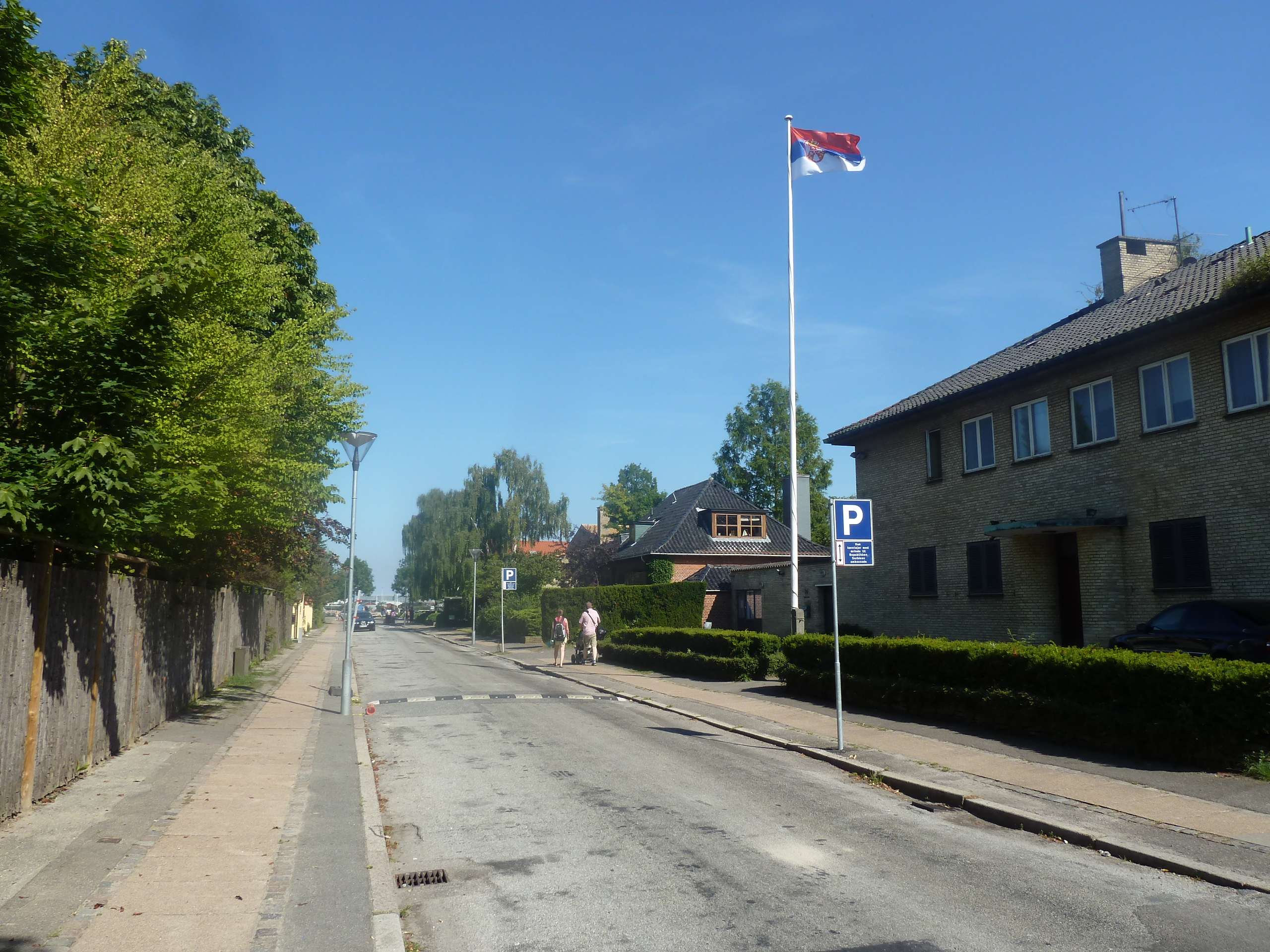
Embassy of Serbia in Copenhagen

== See also ==
- Foreign relations of Denmark
- Foreign relations of Serbia
