= Luxembourg–Serbia relations =

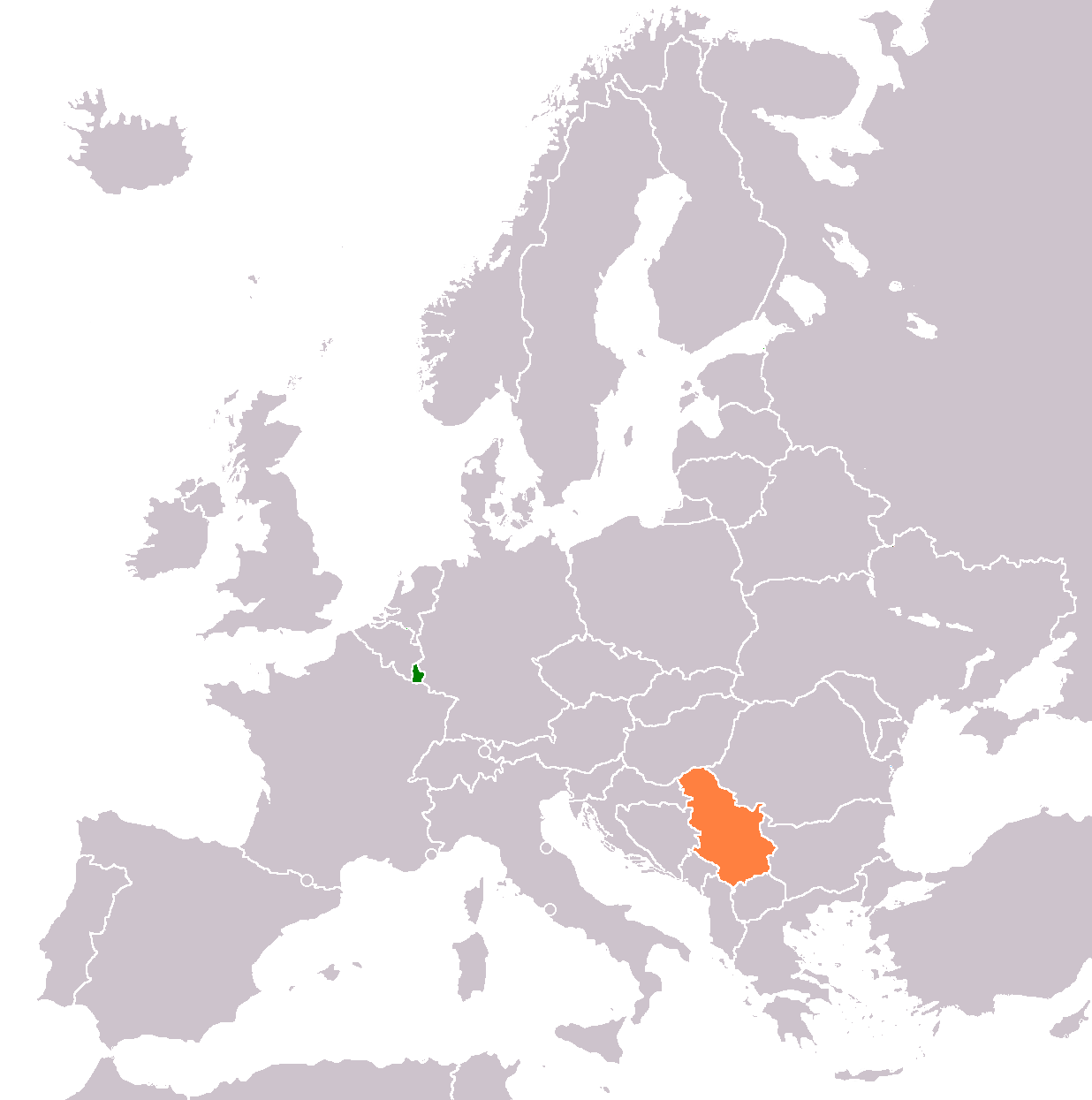

- Luxembourg: Serbia

Luxembourg and Serbia maintain diplomatic relations established between Luxembourg and Kingdom of Yugoslavia in 1927. From 1927 to 2006, Luxembourg maintained relations with the Kingdom of Yugoslavia, the Socialist Federal Republic of Yugoslavia (SFRY), and the Federal Republic of Yugoslavia (FRY) (later Serbia and Montenegro), of which Serbia is considered shared (SFRY) or sole (FRY) legal successor.

== Economic relations ==
Trade between two countries amounted to over $63 million in 2023; Luxembourg merchandise exports to Serbia were standing at roughly $38 million; Serbia's export to Luxembourg were about $25 million.

== Immigration from Serbia ==
According to data from 2021 census, there were 1,218 Serbian nationals in Luxembourg.

== Resident diplomatic missions ==
- Luxembourg is represented in Serbia through a non-resident ambassador based in Luxembourg City (at the Ministry of Foreign Affairs of Luxembourg).
- Serbia is represented in Luxembourg through its embassy in Brussels, Belgium.

== See also ==
- Foreign relations of Luxembourg
- Foreign relations of Serbia
