= Germany–NATO relations =

German-NATO relations
- Germany: NATO

Relations between Germany and NATO are the foundation of North Atlantic Council. Germany joined the Alliance in 1955, and since then its membership in NATO has been constantly evolving, making the alliance more political. After the end of the cold War, Germany significantly increased its military contribution to NATO, reflecting a new emphasis on collective and national defense, which was caused by Russia's aggressive war against Ukraine. Germany remains the central pillar of the Alliance, and its membership in the alliance has become a powerful economic and military stronghold.

== History ==
After the end of World War II, the creation of West Germany became a key aspect of the Cold War. The United States viewed the remilitarization of West Germany as a vital means to counter Soviet expansion. West Germany joined NATO in 1955. This step was of great importance both for strengthening the defensive system and for restoring German sovereignty.

After the unification of Germany in 1990, it remained part of NATO, which made the Alliance a more political entity aimed at ensuring stability in Europe.

In July 2022, Germany fully approved Finland's and Sweden's application for NATO membership.

== Germany's role and contribution ==
NATO is the cornerstone of German security and defense policy. Germany's security is closely linked to the security of its allies.

Germany is making a significant contribution to strengthening the Alliance's military power and sharing responsibilities, which underscores its importance in this organization.

Germany is a supporter of transatlantic cooperation and stands for the maintenance of peace, stability and democracy within the framework of a multilateral order based on principles.

== Key aspects of modern relations between Germany and NATO ==
After the outbreak of the war in Ukraine, Germany significantly increased its defense spending. It invests at least 2% of its GDP in this sector, which is the highest figure in recent decades.

In May 2026, prior to a NATO meeting in Helsingborg, Sweden, Foreign Minister Johann Wadephul announced that Germany would spend more than 4% of its GDP on defense in 2026 and was aiming to reach 5%.

== Germany's foreign relations with NATO member states ==
- Albania
- Belgium
- Bulgaria
- Canada
- Croatia
- Czech Republic
- Denmark
- Estonia
- Finland
- France
- Greece
- Hungary
- Iceland
- Italy
- Latvia
- Lithuania
- Luxembourg
- Montenegro
- Netherlands
- North Macedonia
- Norway
- Poland
- Portugal
- Romania
- Slovakia
- Slovenia
- Spain
- Sweden
- Turkey
- United Kingdom
- United States

== See also ==
- Foreign relations of Germany
- Foreign relations of NATO
