= Germany–Kosovo relations =

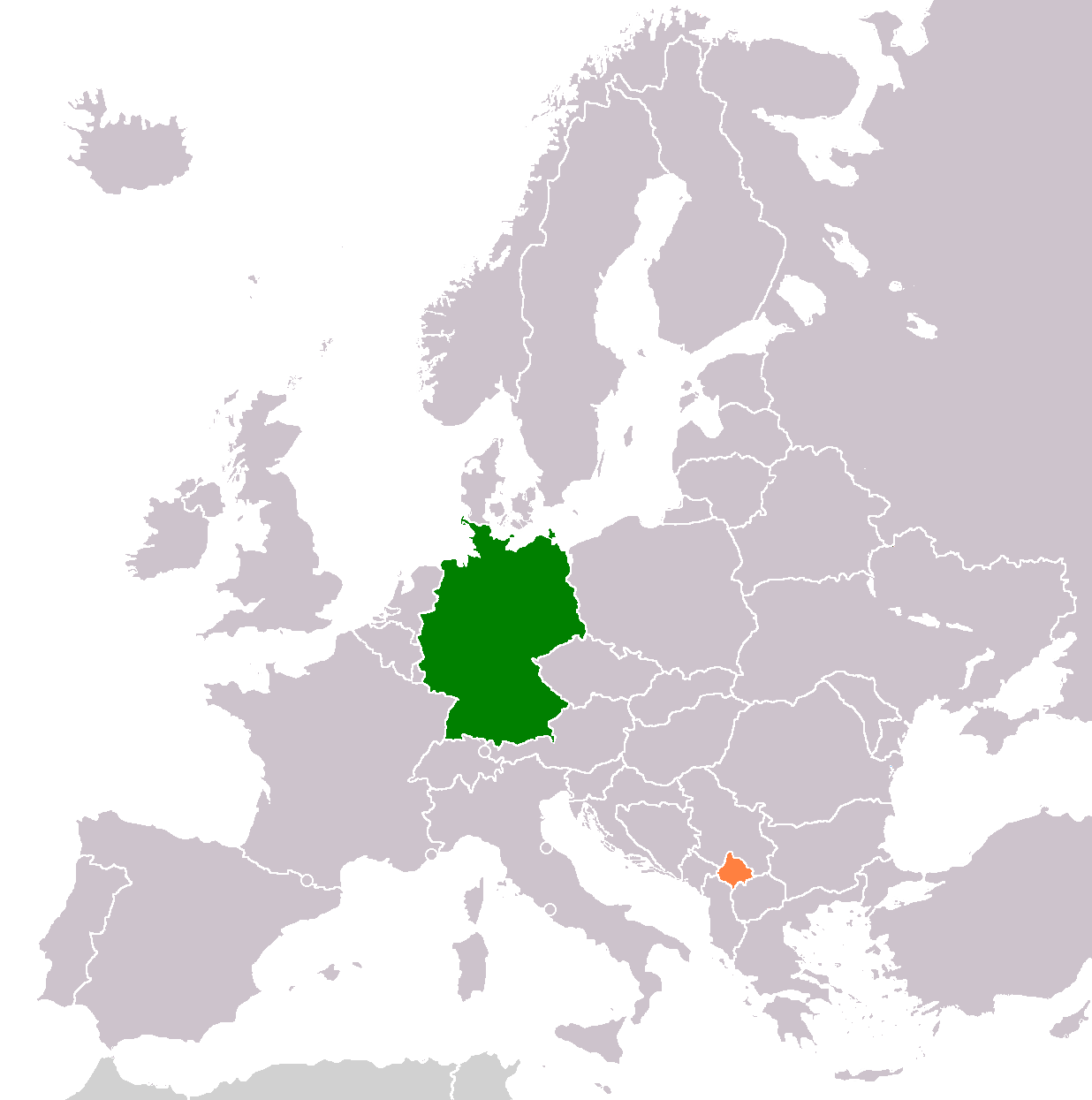

- Germany: Kosovo

Diplomatic mission
- Embassy of Germany, Pristina: Embassy of Kosovo, Berlin

Envoy
- Ambassador Jörn Rohde: Ambassador Beqë Cufaj

The relations between Federal Republic of Germany and the Republic of Kosovo. When Kosovo declared independence in 2008, Germany was among the first countries to officially recognize it 20 February 2008 and establish diplomatic relations. Germany has an embassy in Pristina since 27 February 2008. Kosovo has an embassy in Berlin and consulates in Frankfurt, Stuttgart, Munich, Düsseldorf and Leipzig.

Before and during the Kosovo-Serbia 1998-99 conflict. Germany took in hundreds of thousands of refugees from Kosovo. Starting in 1999, Germany helped rebuild Kosovo, first with emergency relief efforts and then by beginning development cooperation.

Germany's role during the Kosovo War was a pivotal moment in this relationship. The decision to participate in NATO's Operation Allied Force in 1999 and later contribute to KFOR marked a historic shift for Germany it was the country's first major military deployment since World War II. This decision sparked significant debate within the Green Party, known for its pacifist roots, as well as within the federal government under Chancellor Gerhard Schröder and Foreign Minister Joschka Fischer. Despite these internal discussions, Germany's involvement became a major milestone in its foreign and security policy, leading to a long-term commitment to Kosovo's security.

Over the past 25 years, Germany has been a key player in Kosovo's reconstruction, investing over €1 billion through various initiatives, particularly via GIZ. It has also maintained a Bundeswehr presence to help safeguard stability. Germany remains a steadfast supporter of Kosovo's path toward Euro-Atlantic integration and initiated the Berlin Process to provide high-level political support, foster regional cooperation, and ultimately prepare Western Balkan countries for EU membership.

Since 1999, the “Deutsche Gesellschaft für Internationale Zusammenarbeit“ (GIZ) GmbH has been working in Kosovo on behalf of the German Federal Ministry for Economic Cooperation and Development (BMZ). GIZ helps and advises Kosovo in its efforts to achieve political stability and build a democracy based on the rule of law. As part of this, they support programs that boost the economy, improve the education system, create a decentralized public administration, and reduce youth unemployment. The main long-term goal is for Kosovo to join the European Union (EU).

The main goals of the Government of the Republic of Kosovo include economic development, creating jobs and improving welfare; enforcing the rule of law; pursuing the European agenda; and focusing on education, science, culture, youth, and sports. Germany and Kosovo are working together in several priority areas: Sustainable Economic Development: They aim to stabilize the economy, boost employment and competitiveness, promote regional economies, and enhance basic education and vocational training. Public Administration, Democracy, and Civil Society: This includes improving municipal services, reforming public finance systems, legal reforms, EU integration efforts, youth development, and land management. Energy: They're working on improving energy efficiency. These collaborations are all part of Kosovo's long-term goal of joining the European Union.

Germany is Kosovo's second most important trading partner, largest investor and also the largest bilateral donor in the field of development cooperation. Since 1999, Germany has provided over 660 million euros for technical and financial cooperation projects. Since April 2024, there has also been a climate and energy partnership with Kosovo, which aims to promote Kosovo's green transition and enable Kosovo's participation in international climate formats.

After recent negotiations, Germany has pledged an additional 90 million euros in support to Kosovo for 2024 and 2025, with 20 million euros given as grants. This is a significant increase from the 37 million euros provided in 2022 and 2023, showing that the cooperation between the two countries is growing stronger.

These funds will help Kosovo in its efforts to join the European Union. The money will be used for investments in the energy sector, especially in reducing carbon emissions, promoting sustainable economic development, providing training and creating jobs, and supporting local municipalities—particularly in waste management and environmental conservation.

== BND affair ==
On 19 November 2008 three agents of the Bundesnachrichtendienst were arrested in Kosovo and accused of involvement in a bomb attack five days earlier. The German media speculated that this arrest was meant as some kind of punishment for the BND, which in 2005 certified that Prime Minister Hashim Thaçi was involved in the Kosovar-Albanian mafia network. Even though the Kosovo police claimed to have video evidence proving the involvement of the three agents (which was never shown to the public), they were released on November 28, 2008. An unknown group called Army of the Republic of Kosovo (ARK) claimed responsibility for the bomb attack.

== Military ==
Germany participated in the 1999 NATO bombing of Yugoslavia, which resulted in a UN administration of Kosovo and then to eventual independence. Germany currently has 2,350 troops serving in Kosovo as peacekeepers in the NATO led Kosovo Force. Originally there were 8,500 German troops in KFOR. Klaus Reinhardt was the 2nd KFOR Commander from 8 October 1999 until 18 April 2000. Holger Kammerhoff was the 8th KFOR Commander from 3 October 2003 until 1 September 2004. Roland Kather was the 11th KFOR Commander from 1 September 2006 until 31 August 2007.

Germany sent 600 Soldiers to serve as Peacekeepers in EULEX; an EU Police, Civilian and Law Mission in Kosovo.

Germany also takes part in international missions in Kosovo. Right now, the German troops in KFOR represent the largest overseas deployment of the German military. German police officers, judges, public prosecutors, and civilian experts involved in the UN mission UNMIK, the EU rule of law mission EULEX, and the OSCE mission OMIK have helped to strengthen the good relations between the two countries even more. The KFOR (Kosovo Force) operation aims to bring political stability to Kosovo and provide military support for peace efforts. Stability in Kosovo is important not just for the region but also for German and European security policies. The Russian attack on Ukraine has made this mission even more necessary.

German soldiers are helping to maintain public order as part of NATO. They are involved in various areas to support the democratic stabilization of the country, with the goal of establishing long-term security and peace in the region. While the security situation in Kosovo is mostly calm and stable, there's still a risk of conflict, especially in the northern part of the country near the border with Serbia.

The German government's continued participation in KFOR shows its commitment to peace and security in the region. Up to 400 German soldiers may be deployed to help maintain public order and security, coordinate international humanitarian aid, and assist in developing the Kosovo Security Force (KSF) as a democratic national security organization. Even outside of military efforts, Germany is working at the EU level to help normalize relations between Serbia and Kosovo.

== See also ==
- Foreign relations of Germany
- Foreign relations of Kosovo
- Kosovo-NATO relations
- Accession of Kosovo to the EU
- Germany–Serbia relations
- Germany–Yugoslavia relations
- East Germany–Yugoslavia relations
