= Germany–Serbia relations =

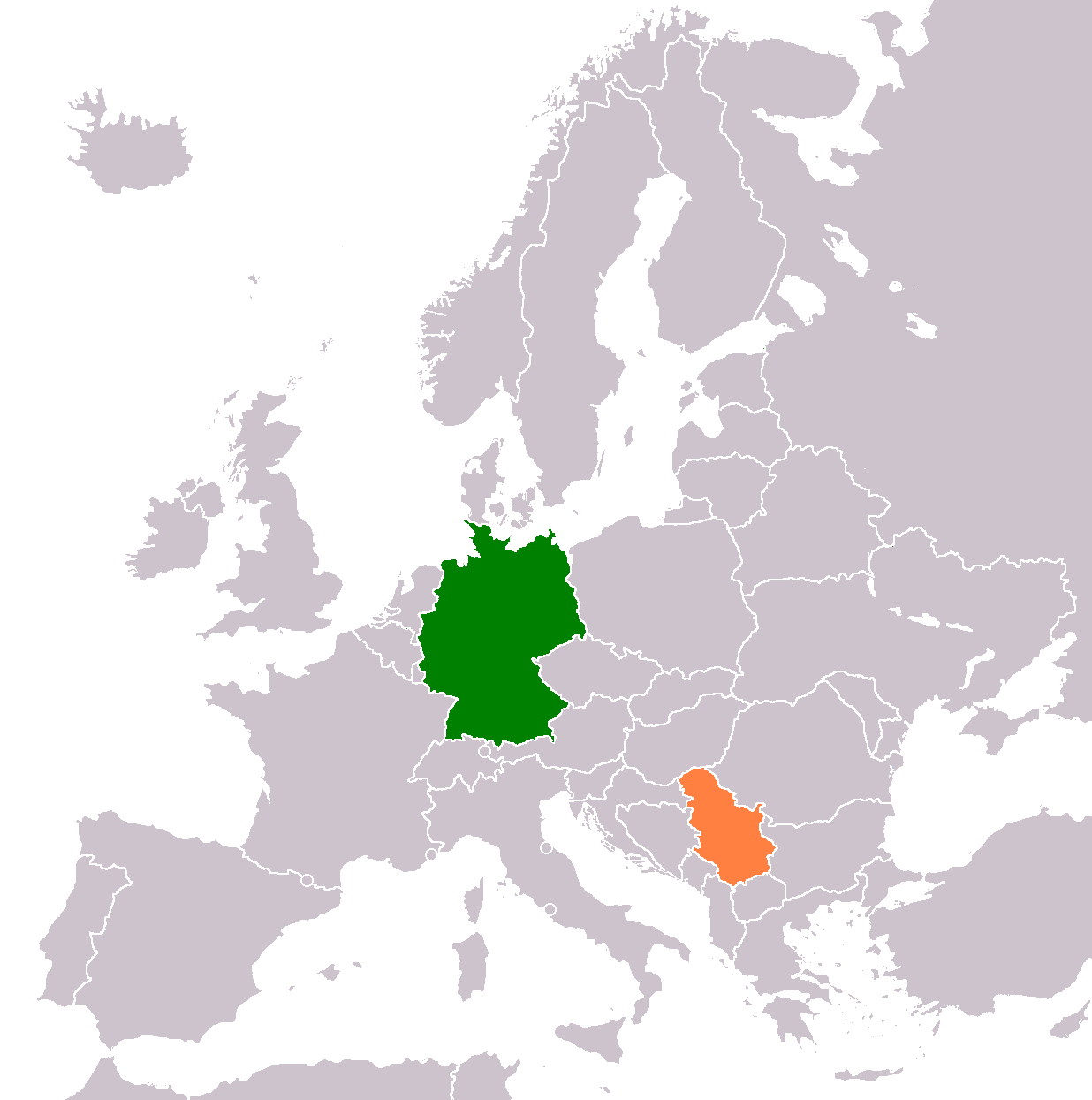

- Germany: Serbia

Germany and Serbia maintain diplomatic relations established in 1879. From 1918 to 2006, Germany maintained relations with the Kingdom of Yugoslavia, the Socialist Federal Republic of Yugoslavia (SFRY), and the Federal Republic of Yugoslavia (FRY) (later Serbia and Montenegro), of which Serbia is considered shared (SFRY) or sole (FRY) legal successor.

== History ==
The origin of Serbian-German relations can be traced to the Middle Ages. Serbian Grand Prince Stefan Nemanja and Emperor Frederick I had a meeting in modern-day Niš in the 12th century. During the rise of Serbian medieval state, Saxon miners were brought to Serbia in order to further expand the mining industry, which was the main source of wealth and power of Serbian rulers. Saxons were given certain privileges for their work. Traveling artists from modern day Germany visited medieval courts of Serbia with recorded names including a bagpiper named Kunz who performed in 1379, a flute player named Hans in 1383, and a piper from Cologne named Peter in 1426.

Culture of Serbs in Habsburg monarchy was largely influenced by German culture, and a part of Serbs were subjected to Germanisation. Due to German influences and several other reasons, Serb cultural model was reshaped and looked up to those of countries of Central Europe.

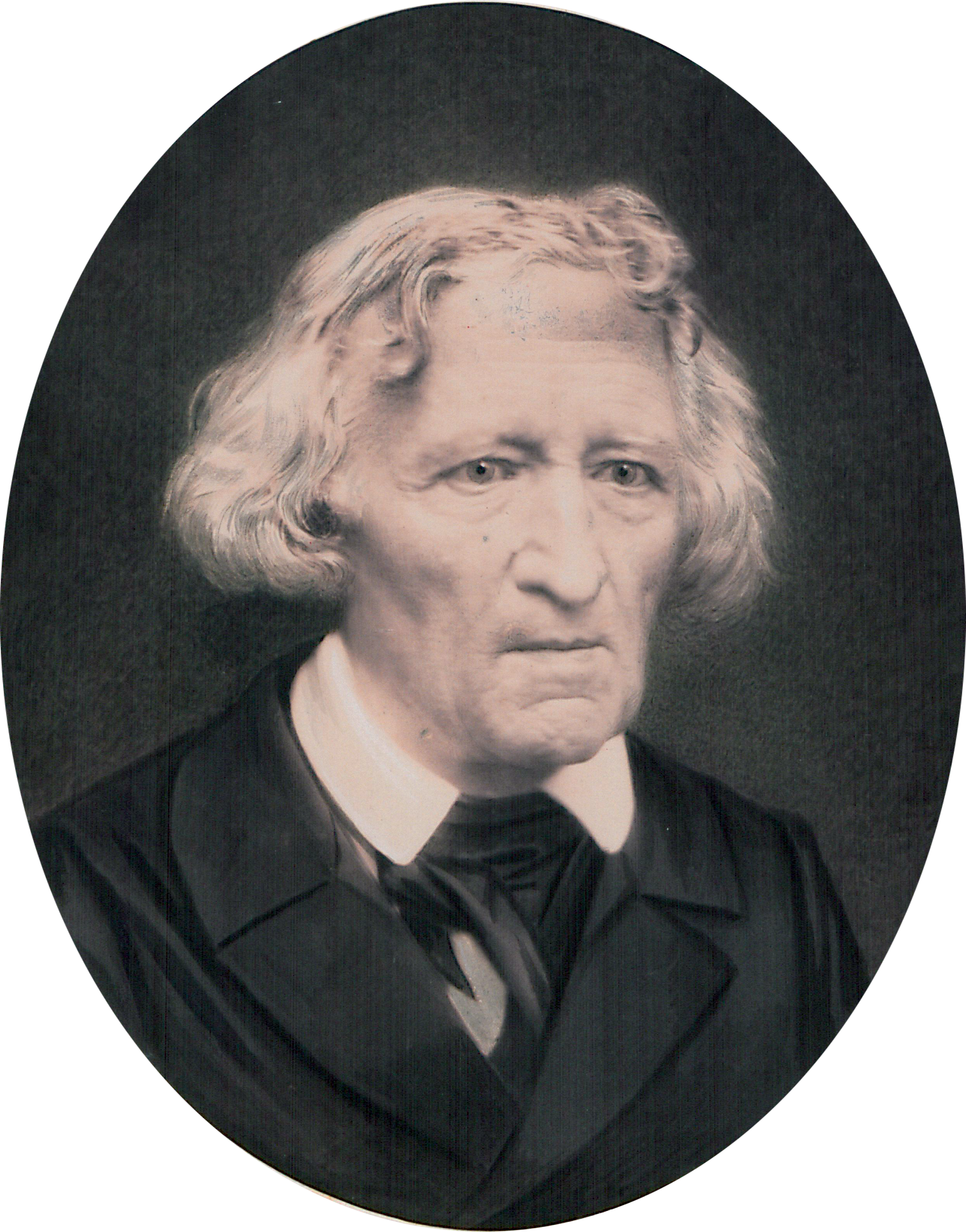
Jacob Grimm, German author, linguist, philologist, was a member of the Serbian Academy of Sciences and Arts

The Principality and the Kingdom of Serbia held strong relations with Germany. Most Serbian engineers and technical experts were educated in Germany or in German-speaking countries, and German was the required language in related higher education institutions. Munich was an important education center for Serb painters. German architects also influenced the architecture of Serbia. Serbian civil and trade laws, as well as organisation of University of Belgrade, was influenced by German models.

Relations of the two countries were on a very low level after the World War I, but trading and joint businesses never stopped. In the interwar period, German political and cultural influence became less relevant, as France became the primary influence on Kingdom of Yugoslavia, and French culture was favored by Serb elites. However, under Stojadinović's reign, Yugoslavia became closer to Nazi Germany and moved away from its traditional allies, France and Great Britain. In the later years, Yugoslavia joined the Tripaltite Pact. A total of 62 PhD theses were defended by Serbian intellectuals in the German language between the two world wars, of which 31 were in the domain of economics. A number of students of the University of Belgrade held German scholarships in the 1930s. Between 1937 and 1940, around 50 Yugoslav citizens studied in Germany, second only to France in the number of foreign students. A number of professors obtained their postgraduate degrees in Germany as well.

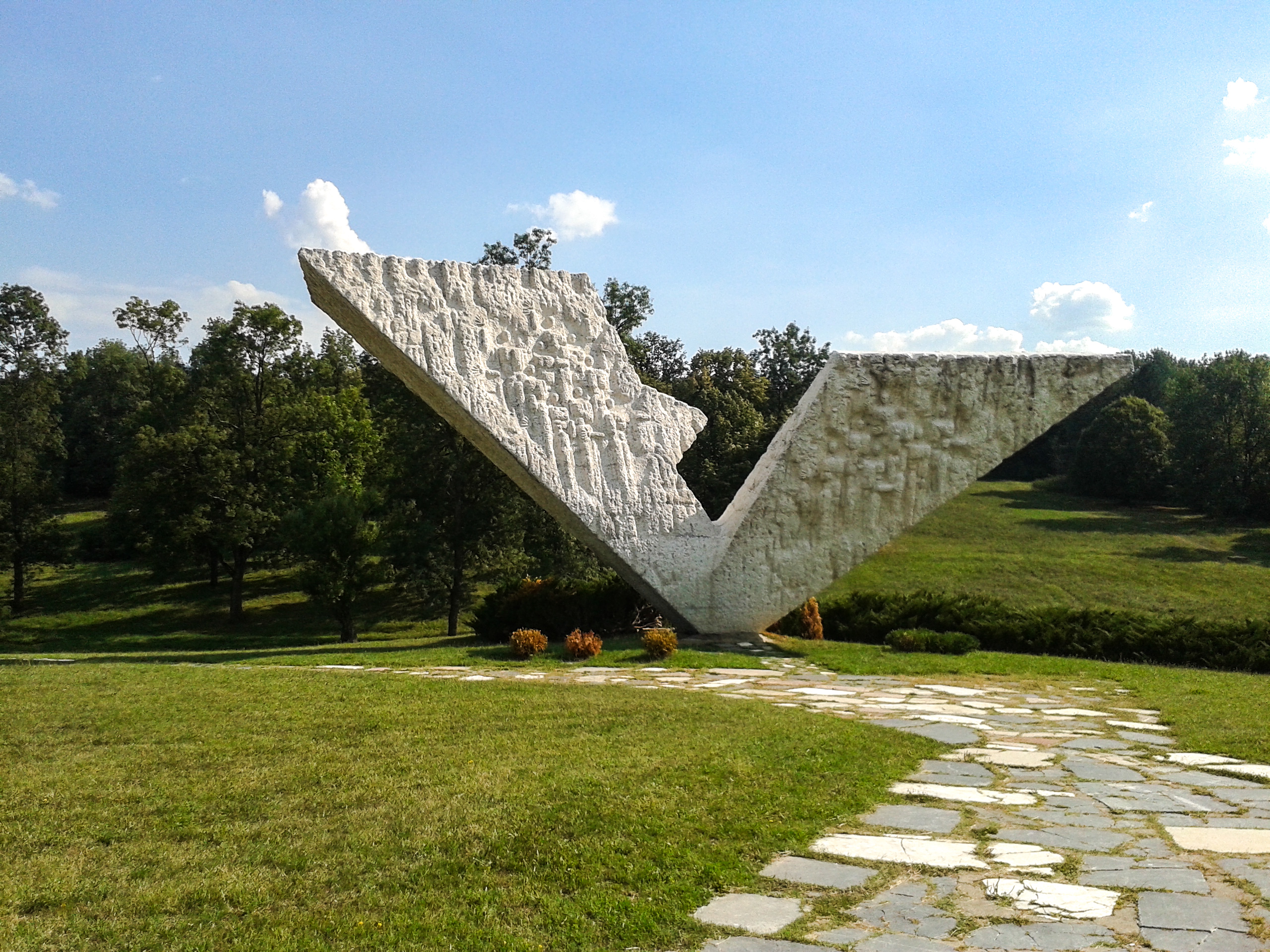
Monument commemorating the victims of the Kragujevac massacre

In 1941, in spite of Yugoslav attempts to remain neutral, the Axis powers invaded Yugoslavia. The territory of modern Serbia was divided between Hungary, Bulgaria, the Independent State of Croatia, Greater Albania and Montenegro, while the remainder was placed under the military administration of Nazi Germany.

The siege of Kraljevo was a major battle of the uprising in Serbia, led by Chetnik forces against the Nazis. Several days after the battle began the German forces committed a massacre of approximately 2,000 civilians in an event known as the Kraljevo massacre, in a reprisal for the attack. Draginac and Loznica massacre of 2,950 villagers in Western Serbia in 1941 was the first large execution of civilians in occupied Serbia by Germans, with Kragujevac massacre being the most notorious, with over 3,000 victims. After one year of occupation, around 16,000 Serbian Jews were murdered in the area, or around 90% of its pre-war Jewish population during The Holocaust in Serbia. Many concentration camps were established across the area. Banjica concentration camp was the largest concentration camp and jointly run by the German army and Nedić's regime, with primary victims being Serbian Jews, Roma, and Serb political prisoners.

The Republic of Užice was a short-lived liberated territory established by the Partisans and the first liberated territory in World War II Europe, organised as a military mini-state that existed in the autumn of 1941 in the west of occupied Serbia. By late 1944, the Belgrade Offensive swung in favour of the partisans who subsequently gained control of Yugoslavia. Following the Belgrade Offensive, the Syrmian Front was the last major military action of World War II in Serbia. A study by Vladimir Žerjavić estimates total war-related deaths in Yugoslavia at 1,027,000, including 273,000 in Serbia.

== Economic relations ==
Germany is the biggest trading partner of Serbia. Trade between two countries reached almost $10 billion in 2023; Germany's merchandise exports to Serbia were about $5.2 billion; Serbian exports were standing at roughly $4.7 billion.

Germany is a leading foreign investor in Serbia with some 900 German companies employing more than 80,000 people.

German companies invest largely in the manufacturing sector. German manufacturing companies present in Serbia include Aumovio (advanced automotive electronics, including smart control systems and instrument panels, plant in Novi Sad), Continental (automotive hose and piping lines plant in Subotica), Siemens (tramway assembly plant in Kragujevac), Bosch (automotive wiper systems plant in Pećinci), ZF (electric motors, generators, and gearbox components plant in Pančevo), MTU Aero Engines (MRO facility for aircraft engines in Stara Pazova), Henkel (laundry detergent plant in Kruševac), Brose (cooling fan modules, steering system motors, and oil pumps plant in Pančevo), Vorwerk (automotive parts plant in Čačak), Stada (owner of Hemofarm, Serbia's largest pharmaceutical company with plant in Vršac).

German retail chains such as Lidl, Metro, and DM are well-established on Serbian market.

== Cultural cooperation ==
Goethe-Institut, cultural centre devoted to the German culture and language has been operating in Belgrade since 1970.

== Immigration from Serbia ==
According to official data from 2022 census, there were 232,252 Serbian citizens in Germany, while estimated number of people of Serb ethnic descent stands at around 387,000, representing the largest group within the global Serb diaspora.

== Resident diplomatic missions ==
- Germany has an embassy in Belgrade.
- Serbia has an embassy in Berlin and consulates general in Frankfurt, Hamburg, Munich, Stuttgart, and Düsseldorf.
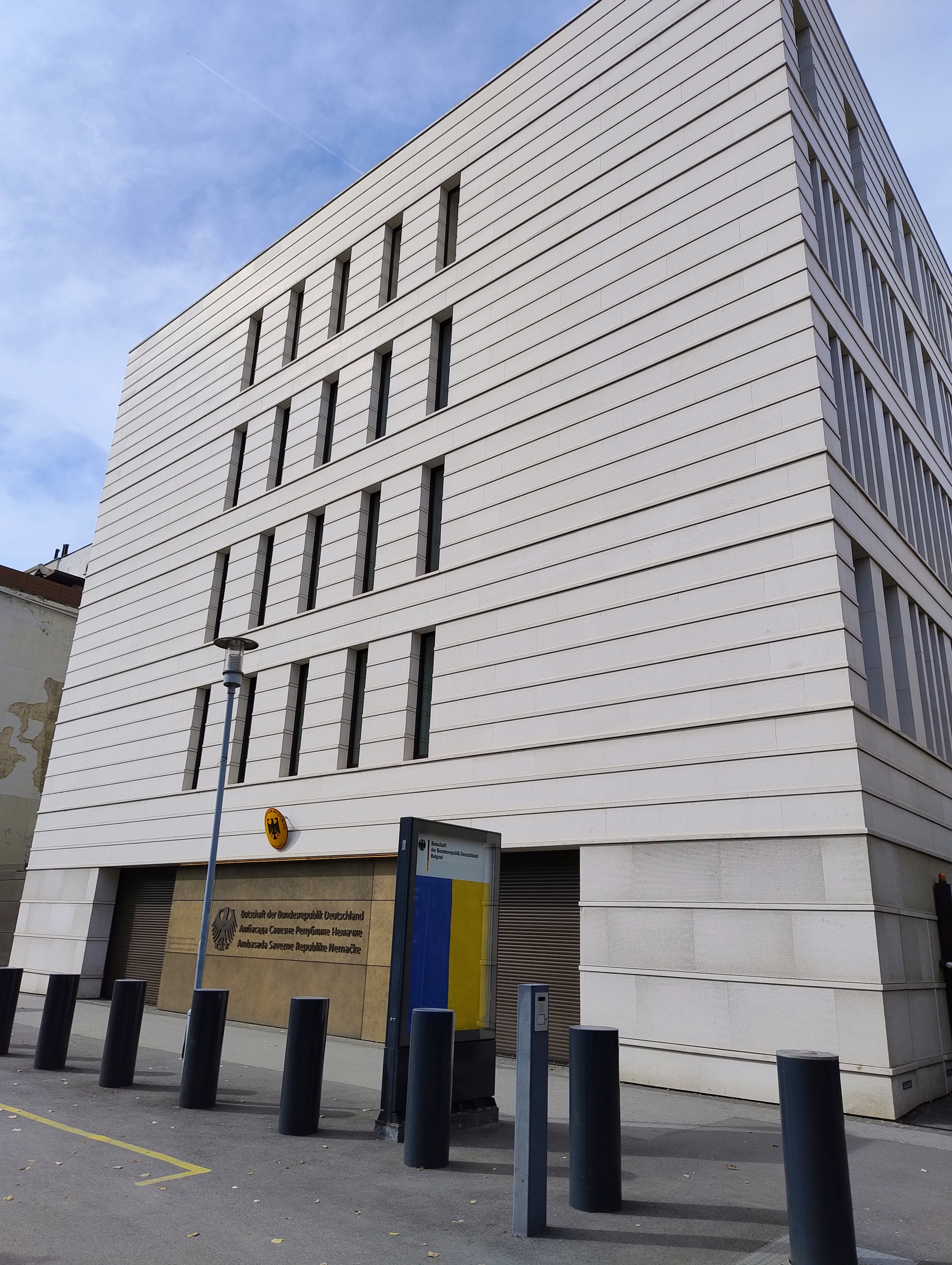
Embassy of Germany in Belgrade

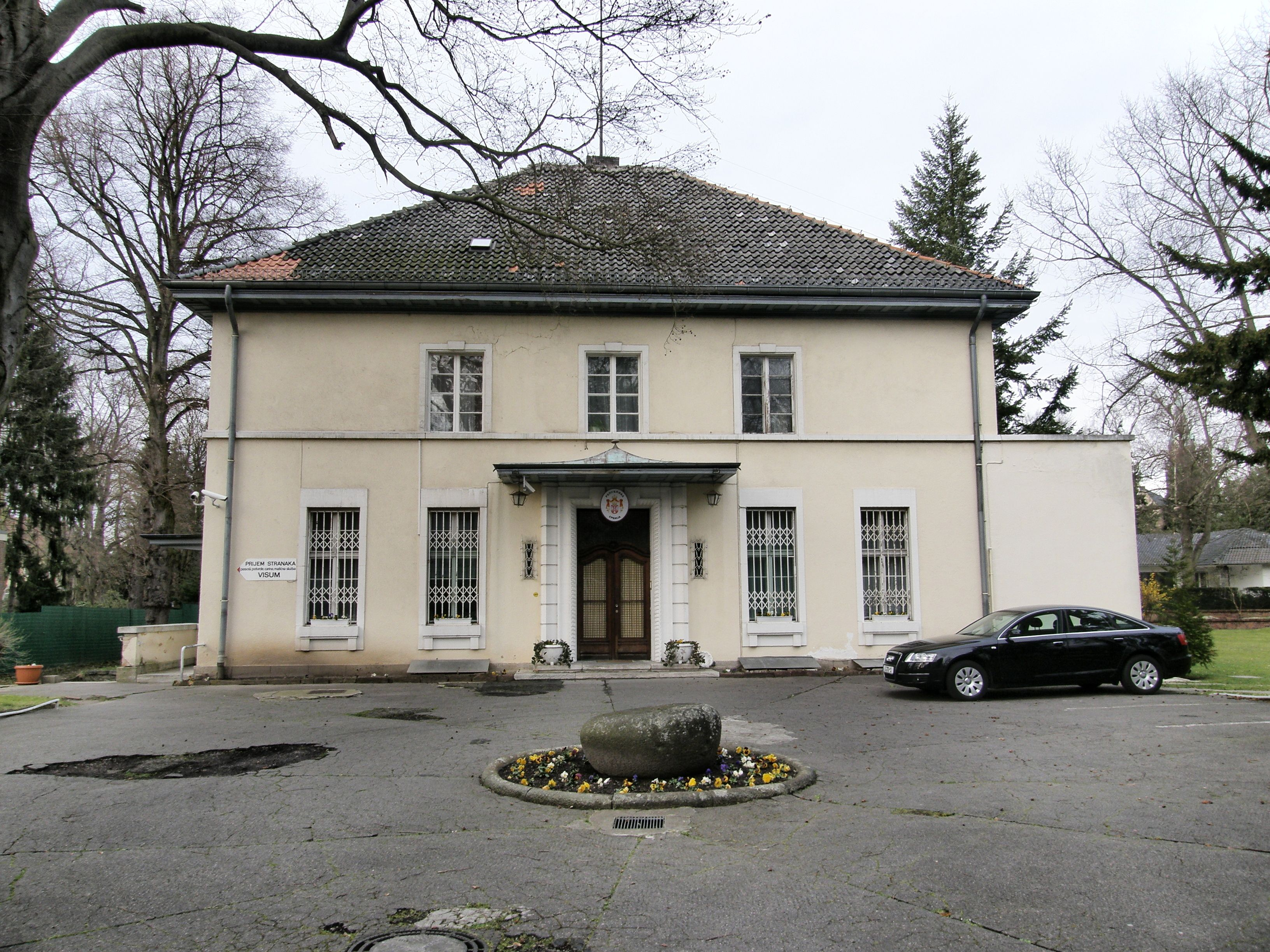
Embassy of Serbia in Berlin

== See also ==
- Foreign relations of Germany
- Foreign relations of Serbia
- Germany–Yugoslavia relations
- East Germany–Yugoslavia relations

== Sources ==
- Gašić, Ranka (2005). Beograd u hodu ka Evropi: Kulturni uticaji Britanije i Nemačke na beogradsku elitu 1918–1941. Belgrade: Institut za savremenu istoriju. ISBN 86-7403-085-8.
- Pavlowitch, Stevan K. (2008). Hitler's New Disorder : the Second World War in Yugoslavia. New York: Columbia University Press. ISBN 978-0-231-70050-4.
- Weinberg, Gerhard (1970). The Foreign Policy of Hitler's Germany A Diplomatic Revolution in Europe 1933-1936. Chicago: University of Chicago Press. ISBN 0-391-03825-7.
