= Germany–Yugoslavia relations =

Germany–Kingdom of Yugoslavia relations
- Germany: Yugoslavia

Germany–Kingdom of Yugoslavia relations
- Germany: Yugoslavia

East Germany–Yugoslavia relations
- East Germany: Yugoslavia

West Germany–Yugoslavia relations
- West Germany: Yugoslavia

Germany–Yugoslavia relations
- Germany: Yugoslavia

The Weimar Republic and the Kingdom of Yugoslavia
West Germany and Yugoslavia

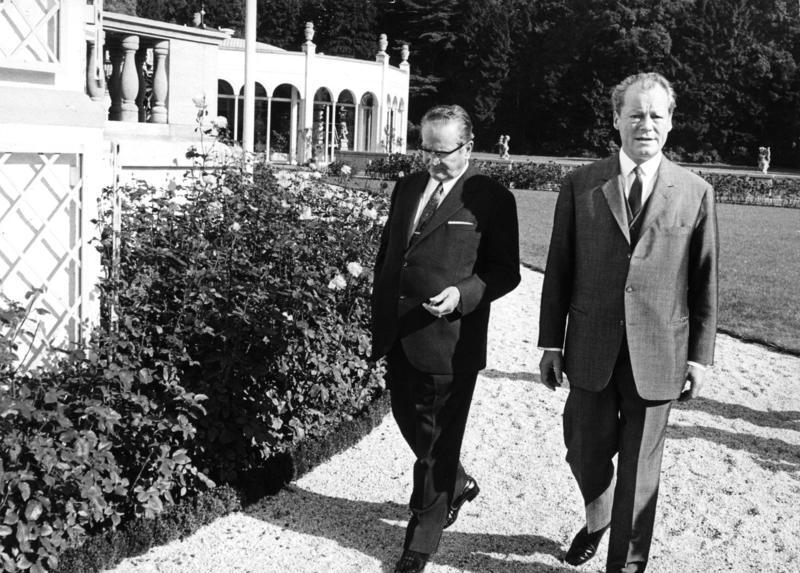
President of Yugoslavia Josip Broz Tito and Chancellor of Germany Willy Brandt

Germany–Yugoslavia relations were post–World War I historical foreign relations between Germany (Weimar Republic, Nazi Germany, Allied-occupied Germany, West Germany and post-reunification Germany until 1992) and now split-up Yugoslavia (both the Kingdom of Yugoslavia or the Socialist Federal Republic of Yugoslavia). The relations between the two countries and societies have been marked by an extensive and complicated history.

The Germans of Yugoslavia (mostly Danube Swabians) in the interwar Kingdom of Yugoslavia were one of the largest minority groups in the country. German-led Axis powers initiated invasion of Yugoslavia on 6 April 1941 initiating the traumatic period of World War II in Yugoslavia.

After World War II, in addition to West Germany, Yugoslavia maintained relations with East Germany as well. Contrary to countries which were part of the Eastern Bloc, socialist but non-aligned Yugoslavia developed significant economic, cultural and tourist and Gastarbeiter mobility and cooperation with West Germany during the Cold War period. Political relation were affected by the decision of Belgrade to formally recognize East Germany but were nevertheless significantly improved with the initiation of Ostpolitik.

== History ==
=== Interwar period ===
Over the centuries German-speaking parts of Europe played important political, cultural, scientific and economic gravitational role for South Slavic communities. Close cultural and economic links remained throughout the 20th century. On 25 March 1941, Yugoslavia signed the Tripartite Pact which just two days later, on 27 March 1941, provoked the British encouraged Yugoslav coup d'état. The coup in turn provoked the Axis invasion of Yugoslavia.

=== World War II ===
In the period of World War II in Yugoslavia, Nazi Germany with its allies and client regimes invaded and divided Yugoslavia. Direct Nazi and client regimes' crimes included the Holocaust in Croatia and Serbia, Genocide of Serbs, Chetnik war crimes and other. The communist-led republican Yugoslav Partisans evolved into Europe's most effective anti-Axis resistance movement. During the flight and expulsion of Germans in the immediate post-war years majority of Germans of Yugoslavia left the country.

=== Cold War ===
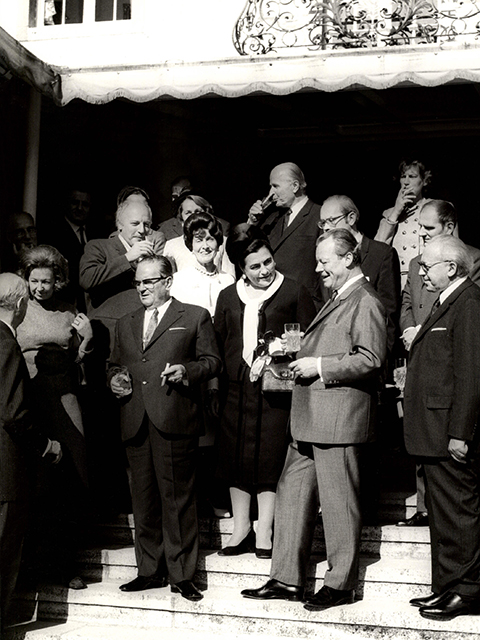
Tito and Brandt in Cologne in 1970

After the war, two countries initiated significant economic cooperation. Yugoslav decision to recognize East Germany in 1957 (as a part of its efforts to improve relations with the Soviet Union after the 1948 Tito–Stalin split) pushed West Germany to apply the Hallstein Doctrine for the first time in history, limiting relations almost exclusively to the economics field for the next eleven years (until 1968) until the initiation of Ostpolitik. Contrary to countries within the Eastern Bloc, Yugoslav authorities permitted free international travel of its citizens while large number of Germans spent their summers at the Adriatic Sea, both of which furthered people to people exchanges. In 1968, Yugoslavia and West Germany signed an agreement on Yugoslav Gastarbeiter workforce, at the time when there was already over 300,000 Yugoslav workers in West Germany. Up until 1973, nearly 700,000 Yugoslav citizens lived and worked in Germany while the Federal Secretary of Foreign Affairs of the Socialist Federal Republic of Yugoslavia run an extensive network of 260 diplomats at the Embassy of Yugoslavia, Berlin Military Mission, Cologne and Stuttgart Information Centers and 11 consulates in Frankfurt, Munich, Hamburg, Stuttgart, Düsseldorf, Freiburg im Breisgau, Ravensburg, Nuremberg, Hanover, Dortmund and Mannheim. Efforts of the Yugoslav diplomacy were complicated by uncoordinated and provocative direct involvements of the federal State Security Administration as well as various sub-national Yugoslav republics' secret service organizations (particularly Croatian one) in surveillance and suppression of nationalist and terrorist Yugoslav émigré groups in Germany.

=== German reunification and Yugoslav crisis ===
At the earliest stage of the Yugoslav crisis, German political elites initially supported preservation of Yugoslavia with only CSU conditionally supporting independence movements. As late as 19 June 1991, all political parties in the Bundestag favored federal reorganization of Yugoslavia but this attitude swiftly changed after the declaration of independence by the Socialist Republic of Croatia and Slovenia and actions of the Yugoslav People's Army from 25 June 1991 onwards. From the end of June 1991, Chancellor of Germany Helmut Kohl strongly supported the right of self-determination for Croatia and Slovenia which led to lack of unity among the European Economic Community (EEC) as President of France François Mitterrand argued against immediate cutoff of aid to Yugoslavia, while Spain, Italy and the United Kingdom insisted on the territorial integrity of Yugoslavia. German readiness to recognize Croatia and Slovenia unilaterally without other EEC member states pushed the entire community to jointly follow the course on 15 January 1992. Germany opened its doors for approximately 700,000 refugees fleeing the Yugoslav Wars, the majority of whom subsequently returned to their relatively nearby region in the former Yugoslavia.

== See also ==
- Bosnia and Herzegovina–Germany relations
- Croatia–Germany relations
- Germany–Kosovo relations
- Germany–Montenegro relations
- Germany–North Macedonia relations
- Germany–Serbia relations
- Germany–Slovenia relations
- World War II reparations towards Yugoslavia
- Yugoslavia–European Communities relations
- World War II reparations towards Yugoslavia
