= Germany–Montenegro relations =

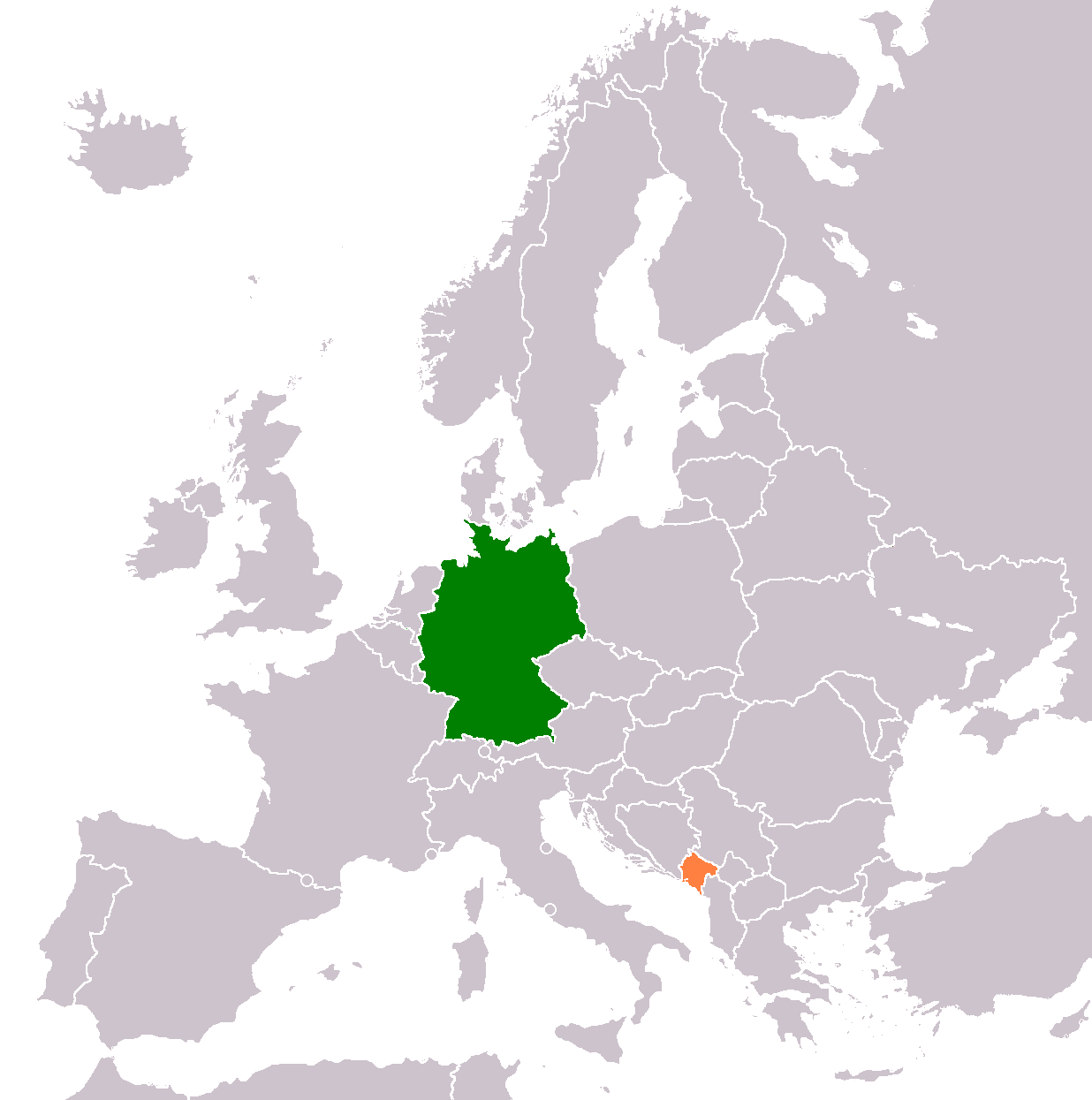

- Germany: Montenegro

Germany–Montenegro relations are foreign relations between Germany and Montenegro. Both countries established diplomatic relations on 14 June 2006. Germany has an embassy in Podgorica. Montenegro has an embassy in Berlin and a general consulate in Frankfurt. Both countries are members of NATO and Council of Europe. Also Germany is an EU member and Montenegro is an EU candidate. In 1997 the German Bundeswehr used the Podgorica Airport for the Operation Libelle, which led to the first skirmish involving German forces since World War II. And Germany is Observer bureau of the BSCE and Montenegro is with Slovenia is a Sectoral dialogue partner countries of BSCE.

== Resident diplomatic missions ==
- Germany has an embassy in Podgorica.
- Montenegro has an embassy in Berlin.
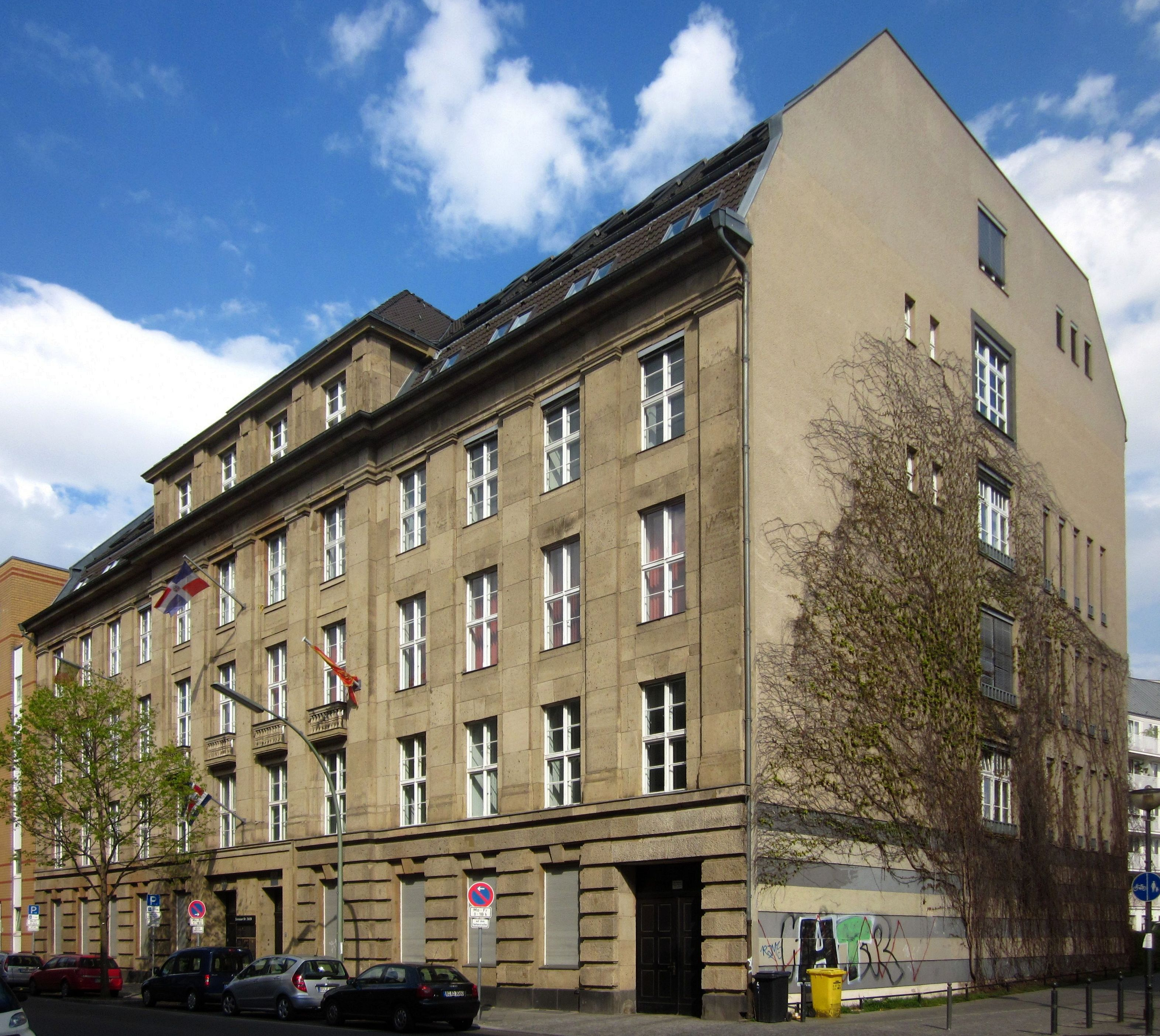
Embassy of Montenegro in Berlin

== See also ==
- Foreign relations of Germany
- Foreign relations of Montenegro
- Accession of Montenegro to the EU
- NATO-EU relations
- Germany–Yugoslavia relations
- East Germany–Yugoslavia relations
- Montenegrins in Germany
