= Croatia–Germany relations =

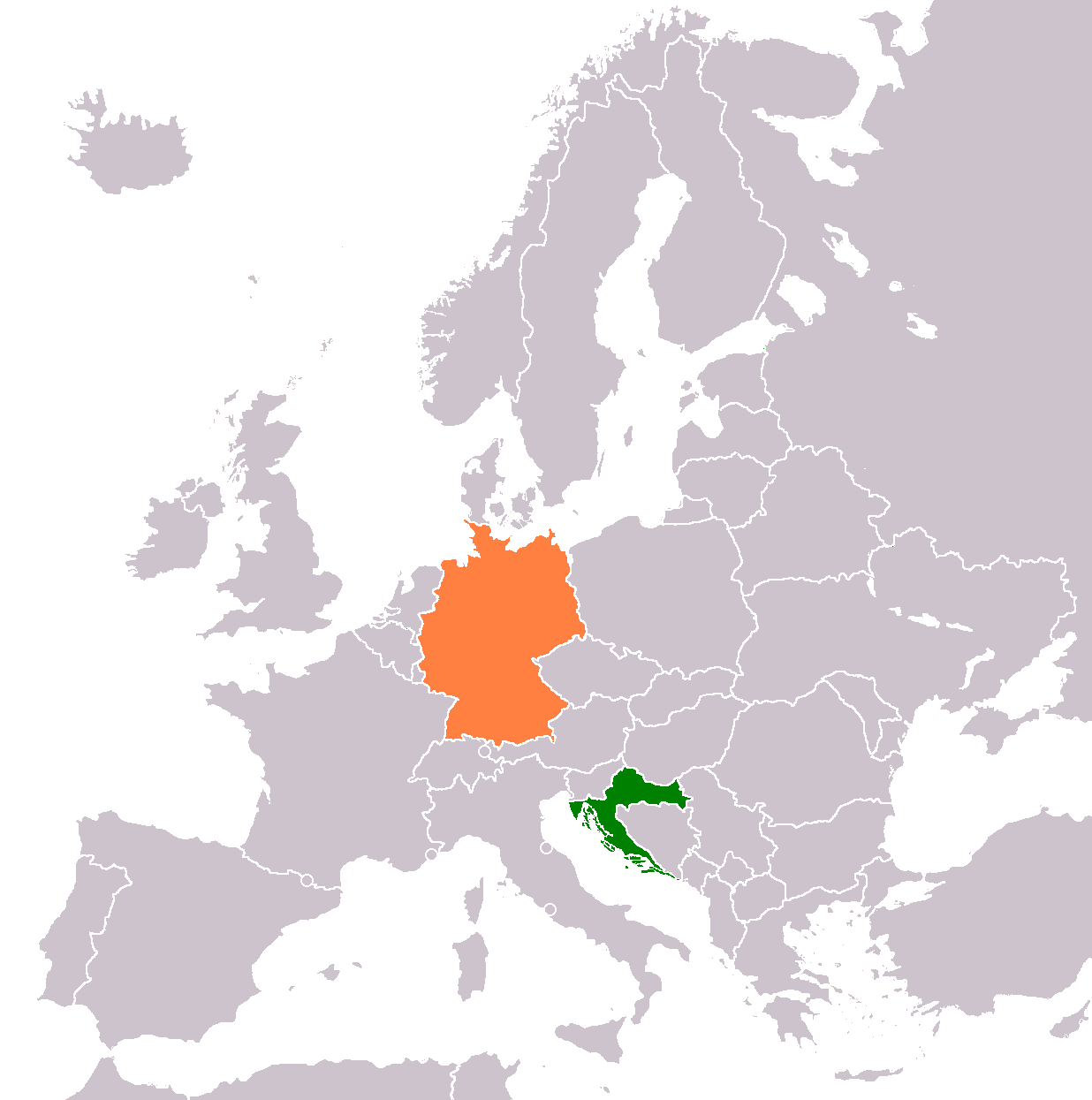

- Croatia: Germany

Diplomatic mission
- Embassy of Croatia, Berlin: Embassy of Germany, Zagreb

Croatia and Germany established diplomatic relations on 15 January 1992. Croatia has an embassy in Berlin and five consulates general in Düsseldorf, Frankfurt, Hamburg, Munich and Stuttgart. Germany has an embassy in Zagreb and an honorary consulate in Split.

As of 2011, there were 360–400,000 people of Croatian origin resident in Germany. According to the 2011 Croatian census there is 2,902 Germans in Croatia. First Croat elected to Bundestag is Josip Juratović (SPD) (2004–present).

Croats and other South Slavic peoples have been greatly influenced by German language and culture for centuries, though the Croats were most heavily influenced due to union with German-speaking Austria. During the Cold War, socialist Yugoslavia, of which Croatia was a member republic, enjoyed good relations with both West and East Germany. Hundreds of thousands of Croatian people migrated to West Germany as Gastarbeiter, and German tourists began visiting Croatia's Adriatic coast in large numbers.

Germany has to date had close co-operations with Croatia. When Croatia declared independence on 25 June 1991, many German politicians and other leaders declared support, with then German Chancellor Helmut Kohl and Foreign Minister Hans-Dietrich Genscher being one of the strongest advocates of international recognition of the newly independent Croatia. Both countries are full members of the Council of Europe, the European Union and NATO. Germany has given full support to Croatia's membership in the European Union and NATO.

== History ==
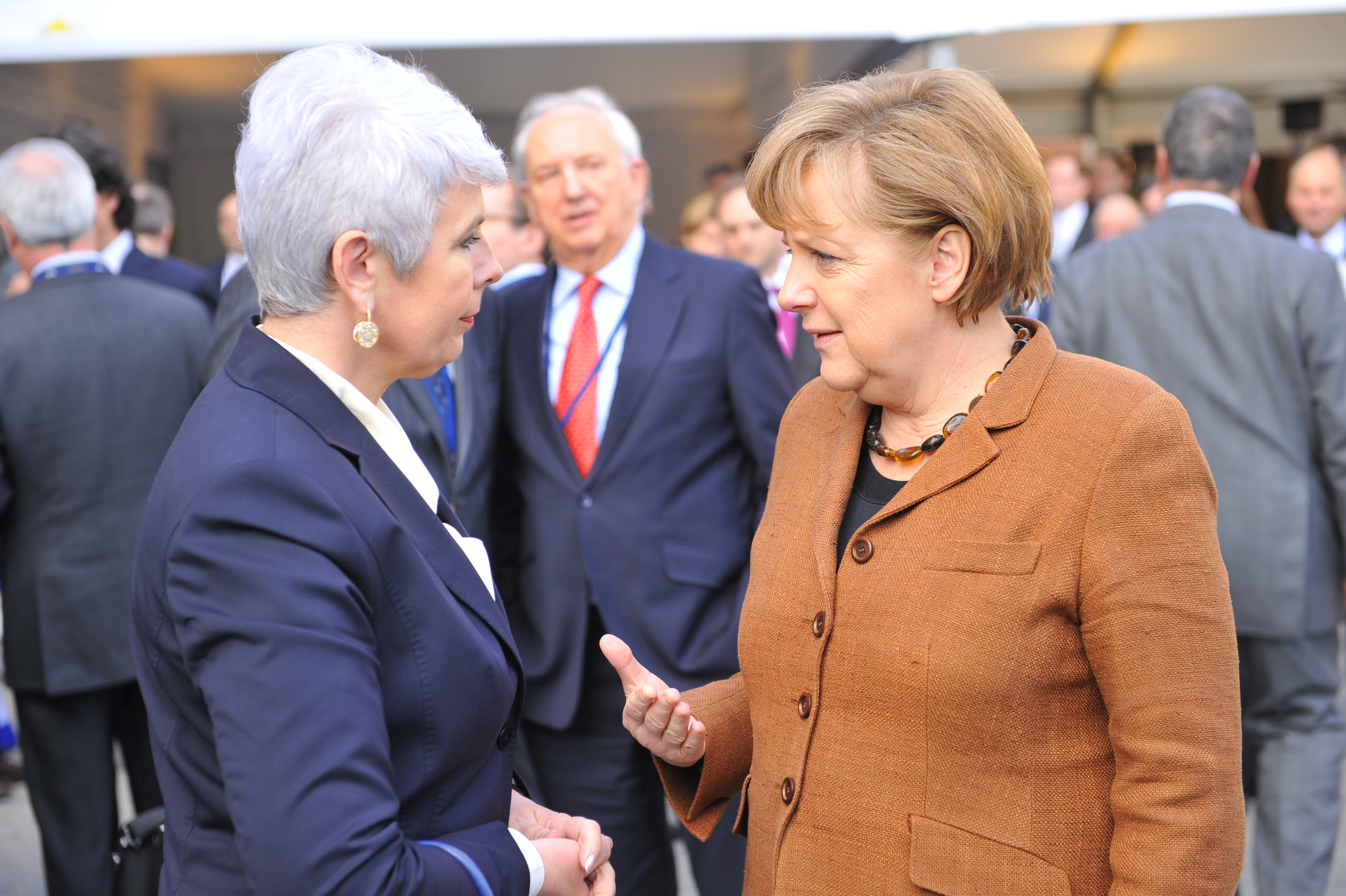
Croatian Prime Minister Jadranka Kosor and German Chancellor Angela Merkel in 2011

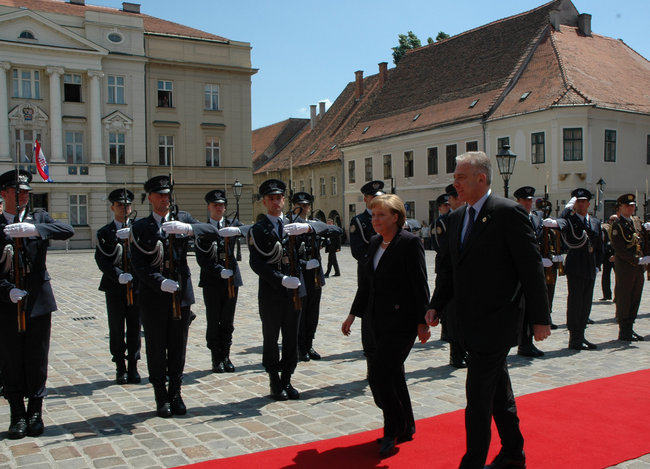
Honor guard in front of Banski dvori, welcoming Chancellor Angela Merkel and Prime Minister Ivo Sanader

One of the first contacts between Croats and Germans (Francia) was mentioned by Gottschalk of Orbais in the description of Croatia King Trpimir I in the 9th century. At that time, there have been acts of war between the Franks and Croats. For example, in year 838 Bavarian Duke and later King Louis sent troops against the Croatian Duke Ratimir who successfully resisted the attack. In recent times Croats connected with the German speaking countries through the Croatian union with Austria (1527–1918).

In the 17th and 18th centuries planned settlement of German-speaking population of Danube Swabians onto the Croatian soil was conducted because some of those Croatian parts of the Austrian empire had lost a lot of population due to Ottoman–Habsburg wars. Most of these immigrants settled in the Croatian villages in Eastern Slavonia, especially in Osijek, and Western Syrmia.

In the First World War Croats fought on the side of the Central Powers, alongside Germany, the Ottoman Empire and Bulgaria. With the collapse of the dual monarchy in 1918, the Croats as well as Croatian Germans first entered the State of Slovenes, Croats and Serbs and in 1919 Kingdom of Serbs, Croats and Slovenes. The Germans tried to organize a German party (Partei der Deutschen) so they could be directly represented in the National Assembly but Government prohibited that.

In 1941 Hitler attacked and occupied Yugoslavia. He created a Nazi-puppet state Independent State of Croatia (NDH) on part of Yugoslavian territory. Many German soldiers from Wehrmacht had been deployed all across the NDH. During 1942 and 1943 even more soldiers arrived from Germany because of an increase number of attacks on the Nazis by the Yugoslav partisans who were led by Josip Broz Tito.

At the end of the war, a large number of Danube Germans withdrew together with the German army. Those who remained were subjected to repression by the Yugoslav authorities which have won the war. The same persecution of Germans was implemented all across Europe by the Allies. These reprisals were caused by the statement that all Germans collectively collaborated with the German-Nazi occupiers which was not true.

In 1955, SFR Yugoslavia and West Germany severed diplomatic relations after the Hallstein Doctrine was accepted by Yugoslavia by which it recognized East Germany. In 1968 diplomatic relations were again established. At that year West Germany and Yugoslavia signed an agreement on labour force which allowed a large number of Croats to go to work in Germany as guest workers. Also, a large number of German tourists began coming on holiday to the Croatian coast. This tradition is maintained to this day.

Germany played an important role in 1991 during the Croatian War of Independence in the fight for recognition of newly formed Republic of Croatia in order to stop ongoing violence in Serb-inhabited areas. Helmut Kohl requested immediate recognition of Croatia in the Bundestag on 4 September 1991. Germany was criticized, mostly by United Kingdom, France and the Netherlands, that its rapid recognition of Croatia would aggravate finding peace settlement. These remarks were opposed by German Foreign Minister Hans-Dietrich Genscher who claimed that the recognition was arranged with the EU partners. Regardless remarks given by these three countries all of them agreed to pursue a common approach and avoid unilateral actions. On 10 October 1991, two days after the Croatian Parliament confirmed the declaration of independence, the EEC decided to postpone any decision to recognize Croatia for two months. German foreign minister Hans Dietrich Genscher later wrote that the EEC decided to recognize Croatian independence in two months if the war had not ended by then. With the war still ongoing when the deadline expired, Germany presented its decision to recognize Croatia as its "policy and duty". German position was fully supported by Italy and Denmark, while France and the UK attempted to prevent German recognition by drafting a United Nations resolution requesting that no country take unilateral actions which might cause the situation in Yugoslavia to get worse. Ultimately, France and the UK backed down during the Security Council debate on the matter on 14 December, when Germany appeared determined to defy the UN resolution. On 17 December 1991 the EEC formally agreed to grant Croatia diplomatic recognition on 15 January 1992 on the basis of its request and a positive opinion of the Badinter Arbitration Commission. Iceland and Germany recognized Croatia on 19 December 1991. They were the first western European countries to do so. In addition, Germany was sending a very large amount of humanitarian aid to Croatia during the war and also received a large number of Croatian refugees.

Germany was one of the strongest advocates of the Croatian accession to NATO (2009) and the European Union (2013).

== Resident diplomatic missions ==
- Croatia has an embassy in Berlin and a consulates-general in Düsseldorf, Frankfurt, Hamburg, Munich and Stuttgart.
- Germany has an embassy in Zagreb.
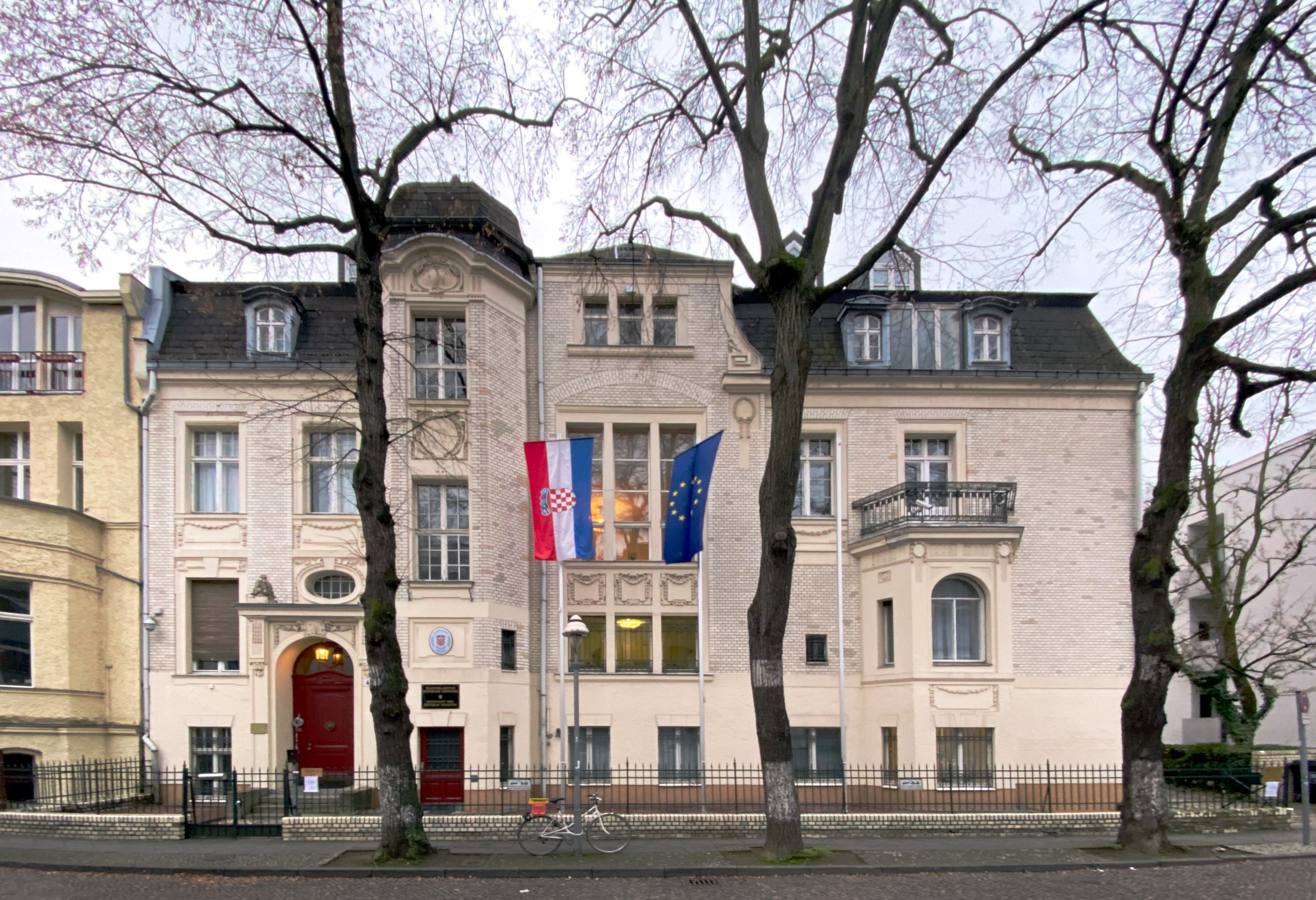
Embassy of Croatia in Berlin

== See also ==
- Foreign relations of Croatia
- Foreign relations of Germany
- Accession of Croatia to the European Union
- Croats in Germany
- Germans of Croatia
- Germany–Yugoslavia relations
- East Germany–Yugoslavia relations
