= Group of Nine =

Group of nine European nations

- 1965 (established)→1971(dissolved)
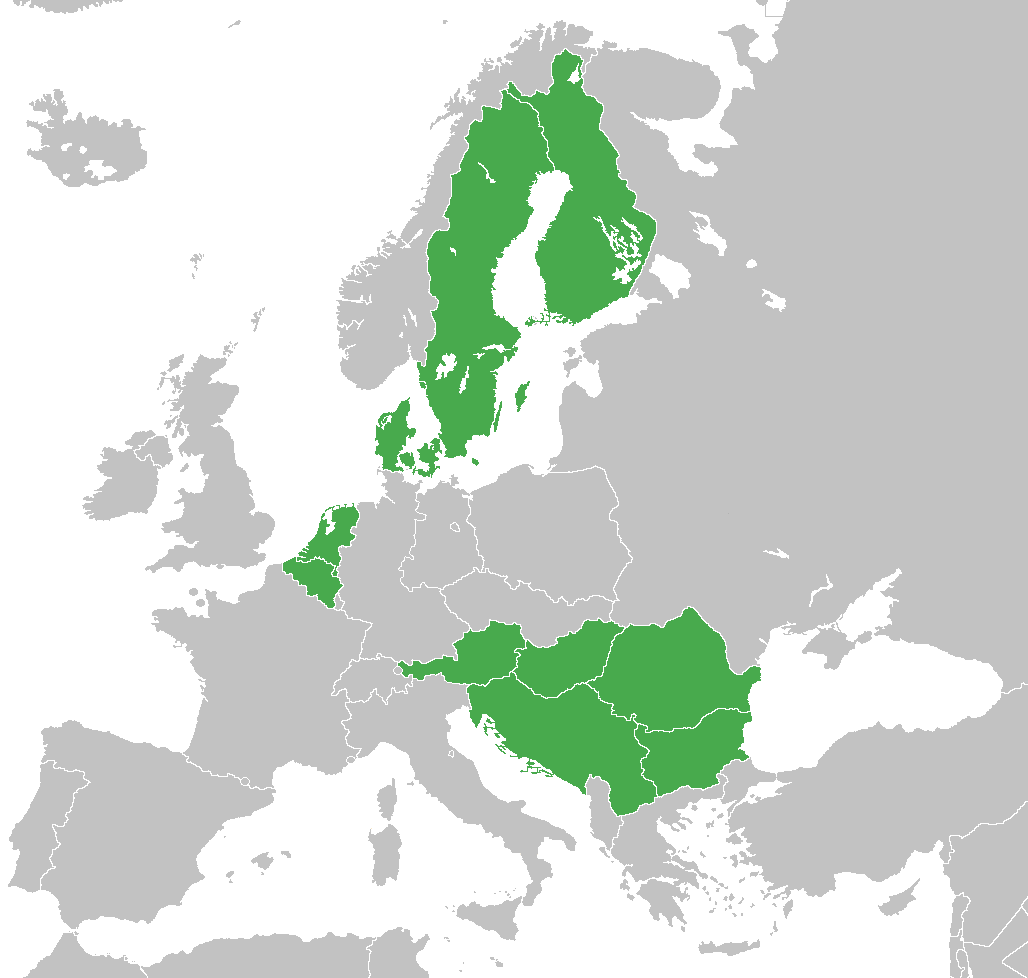
- Group of Nine countries
- Membership: Austria; Belgium; Bulgaria; Denmark; Finland; Hungary; Netherlands; Romania; Sweden; Yugoslavia
- Establishment: 1965

Area
  - Total: 1,644,475 km^{2} (634,935 sq mi)

The Group of Nine (G9) was an alliance of European states that met occasionally to discuss matters of mutual pan-European interest. The alliance formed in 1965, when the nine countries presented a case study at the United Nations. They co-sponsored Resolution 2129 promoting East-West cooperation in Europe, unanimously adopted by the United Nations General Assembly in December 1965. The alliance became the Group of Ten when the Netherlands joined by parliamentary decision in 1967. Following the 1968 invasion of Czechoslovakia, the group attempted to reconcile its differences at a meeting held at the United Nations in October 1969, but failed and subsequently dissolved. All member states, with the exception of the dissolved Yugoslavia, are now part of the European Union.

== Members ==
Austria
Belgium
Bulgaria
Denmark
Finland
Hungary
Netherlands
Romania
Sweden
Yugoslavia

== See also ==
- Yugoslavia–European Communities relations
- Neutral and Non-Aligned European States
- Craiova Group
- Open Balkan
- Group of 15
- G8+5
