= Yugoslavia–European Communities relations =

Yugoslavia and the European Economic Community
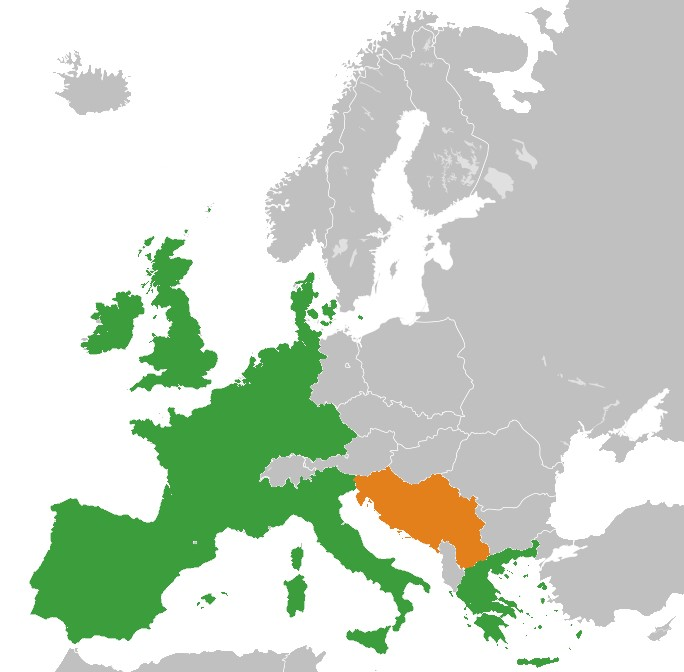

- European Economic Community: Yugoslavia

From the establishment of the European Economic Community (later expanded into the European Union) in 1958 until the breakup of Yugoslavia in the early 1990s, thus during the Cold War period, the Socialist Federal Republic of Yugoslavia was the first socialist state to develop relations with the organisation. Notwithstanding occasional and informal proposals coming from both sides, Yugoslavia never became a full member state of the EEC.

The EEC, and later EU, would cite the breakup of Yugoslavia as a reason for existential guilt in not having averted the humanitarian crisis on adjacent territory, and this served as a springboard for the creation of the Common Foreign and Security Policy.

Mutual interactions between the two sides intensified in the late 1980s and early 1990s but all progress was cut off as of 25 November 1991 due to the wars in Slovenia and Croatia. Prior to the cut off, Yugoslavia was the EEC's second largest trade partner in the Mediterranean area, just after Algeria, with 90% of industrial imports from Yugoslavia to the EEC not subject to any duty. Slovenia, which declared its independence from Yugoslavia, joined the EU in 2004, while Croatia joined in 2013. Other countries, Montenegro, North Macedonia, and Serbia, are currently in accession negotiations, while Bosnia and Herzegovina has been declared a candidate country for EU membership, and Kosovo a potential candidate.

== History ==
=== 1948–1967 ===
After the 1948 Tito–Stalin Split, Yugoslavia realigned its foreign policy from the close alliance with the Soviet Union to de facto western orientation, and then neutrality, to ultimately a Non-aligned course. The 1953 Balkan Pact signed by Greece, Turkey, and Yugoslavia allowed Yugoslavia to associate itself with NATO indirectly until 1956 and the end of Informbiro period. In 1950 Yugoslav Radio Television became one of the founding members of the European Broadcasting Union and it canceled its membership in the IBO that same year. In 1962 Federal People's Republic of Yugoslavia was the first East European nation for which the Council of the European Economic Community accepted the possibility of starting technical talks on cooperation. The Ministry of Foreign Affairs of Yugoslavia held topical meeting on Yugoslav relations with Western European states on February 26, 1964 concluding that those relations are continually improving. During the meeting special attention was given to the Yugoslav relations with West Germany where Ministry commended results in mutual trade, tourist visits and scientific cooperation. On the other hand, the Ministry have criticized German toleration of disruptive activities of post-World War II anti-Yugoslav emigration, campaigns against Koča Popović and postponing of judicial proceeding against the organizers and perpetrators of terrorist attack on Yugoslav representation in Bad Godesberg on November 29, 1962. The Ministry also criticized unwillingness to fulfill obligations and indemnities to the Yugoslav victims of World War II.

=== 1968–1987 ===
Due to developed economic relations and the large expat community, relations with West Germany played a particularly important role in the set of Yugoslav bilateral relations with the EEC member states. Formal bilateral relations between Yugoslavia and West Germany were canceled in accordance to the Hallstein Doctrine after the 1957 Yugoslav recognition of East Germany limiting relations almost exclusively to the economics field. In 1965 expert negotiations with EEC began as well as talks on extent of future economic cooperation and potential trade exchange. Relations were reestablished after the election of Willy Brandt and his 1968 visit to Yugoslavia within his Ostpolitik efforts. Tito and Brandt discussed war reparations leading to the creation of the so-called Brioni Formula focused on development aid and loans under highly generous conditions instead of formal reparations. This formula enabled Yugoslavia to receive up to 1 billion Deutsche Mark and was subsequently used with Poland. Belgrade expressed its dissatisfaction with the unequal treatment of numerous Yugoslav workers in Germany compared to Italian, Spanish and Turkish workers, and with the activities of nationalist emigration groups. There was also dissatisfaction with some of the ceremonial aspect of Ostpolitik in which the Socialist Republic of Romania normalized its relations with West Germany before Yugoslavia and in which famous 1970 Kniefall von Warschau in Warsaw was not followed by similar gesture to victims of the Kragujevac massacre during his second visit to Yugoslavia in 1973. Despite some inherent tensions, the focus of renewed bilateral relations was on international relations including the crises in the Middle East and Vietnam, Conference on Security and Co-operation in Europe and Détente in Europe and activities of the Non-Aligned Movement.

Already in 1967 the formal Declaration on the relations between SFR Yugoslavia and the EEC was signed. In 1969, after the 1968 Warsaw Pact invasion of Czechoslovakia, the Permanent Mission of the SFRY to the EEC has been opened. In 1977 the EEC granted access to the European Investment Bank to Yugoslavia. During the 1977-1978 Belgrade was the host city of the first follow-up meeting of the Conference on Security and Co-operation in Europe. By 1980 European Investment Bank granted two loans in total value of 50 million of ECUs to link the Yugoslav high-voltage electricity distribution network to the Greek and Italian grids and for the construction of part of the trans-Yugoslav road.

In 1978, the European Community and Yugoslavia began negotiations on a Cooperation Agreement, which was signed in April 1980 and entered into force in April 1983. Cooperation Agreement contained provisions concerning trade, financial aid and cooperation in the areas of industry, science and technology, energy, agriculture, transport, the environment and tourism. This agreement was the third one between the two sides and was enabled by Community's willingness to raise its tariff ceilings, which under the previous agreement were much lower for agricultural products. Despite some reservations of some of its member states, the Community was willing to offer more advantageous trading conditions for Yugoslavia due to raising trade imbalance, and increased Yugoslavia's export to Comecon market which became its largest export market in 1974 and its largest overall trading partner in 1978, fact which caused worry both in Brussels and Belgrade. The new agreement included provisions on a wider co-operation in the fields of industry, agriculture, science and technology, energy, tourism and transportation. Special attention was paid to regulating the status of temporary Yugoslav workers while Yugoslavia was recognized as a developing country which meant that trading obligations were no longer equal on both sides but puts a higher formal burden to the community.

=== 1988–1992 ===
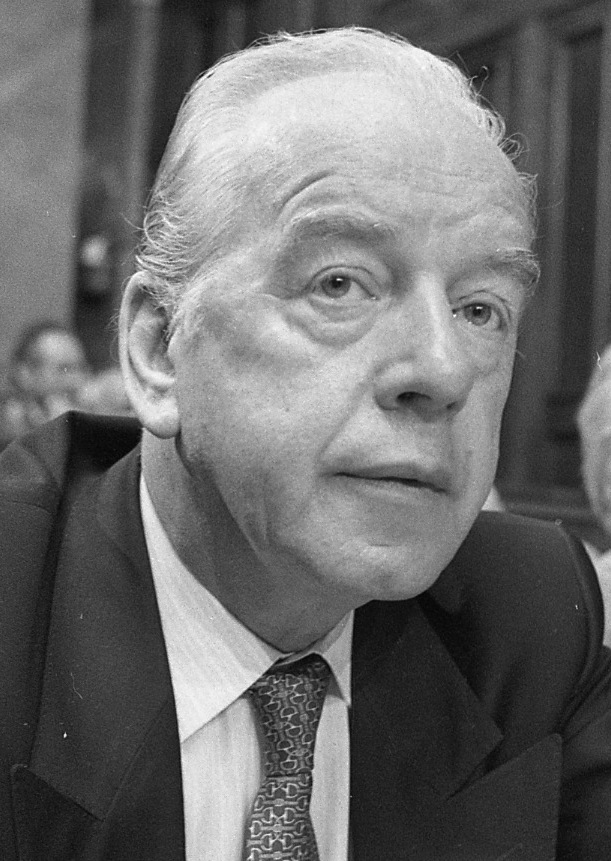
Budimir Lončar

On 8 June 1988, Secretary of State for Foreign Affairs Budimir Lončar said to the members of collective Presidency of Yugoslavia that there are significant integration processes going on in Europe and Single Market is created which requires adaptation from Yugoslavia. In late 1989, Yugoslavia initiated the signing of the association agreement as at that time close to 70% of Yugoslav foreign trade was done with the EEC countries. French politician Claude Cheysson who was a member of the Delors Commission responsible for Mediterranean policy and north–south relations was the strongest advocate of Yugoslav integration with Italian Gianni De Michelis and German Hans Dietrich Genscher not being opposed to the idea. Genscher was of opinion that Yugoslavia may additionally strengthen EEC credibility among the non-NATO member countries, yet official negotiations did not start at that time.

In May 1991 EC President Jacques Delors and Luxembourg Prime Minister Jacques Santer offered to sign an association agreement and an agreement on 5.5 billion dollars support for structural reforms, yet at that time the Yugoslav Wars already were in their initial phase. The two biggest constituent republics, Croatia and Serbia, which were led by hardliners Franjo Tuđman and Slobodan Milošević respectively, refused the proposal. In June 1991 an EEC mission formed by the foreign ministers of Luxembourg, Italy and the Netherlands visited Belgrade, where they talked with Yugoslav Prime Minister Ante Marković, as well as Zagreb, where they talked with Presidents Milan Kučan of Slovenia and Franjo Tuđman of Croatia. The mission members stated that almost $1 billion in economic aid would be suspended if Yugoslav military offensive continued as well as that the EEC favors the preservation of Yugoslavia as a single entity. The community's concern was the Yugoslav geographic position which just like Switzerland divided northern and southern parts of the Community into two. Members of the EEC were divided over the importance they should give to the potentially contradictory principles of self-determination and territorial integrity. German Chancellor Helmut Kohl strongly stressing the right to self-determination, French President François Mitterrand arguing against immediate cutoff of aid to Yugoslavia, while Spain, Italy and United Kingdom insisted on the territorial integrity of Yugoslavia. On 25 November 1991, due to the escalation of hostilities and violations of human rights, all agreements on co-operation between the EEC and SFR Yugoslavia were canceled. Widely perceived EEC's failure in former Yugoslavia, which undermined community's credibility and forced it to ask for United Nations, United States and Russian support, have influenced future development of the Common Foreign and Security Policy. Entry into force of the Maastricht Treaty in November 1993 which established the EU and introduced Common Foreign and Security Policy was deeply symbolically marked by the failure to reach a common stance in Yugoslavia.

=== Recognition of newly independent former Yugoslav republics ===
After initial efforts to ensure the preservation of the Yugoslav federation the Community adopted two consequential policy changing documents known as the "Guidelines for the recognition of new states in Eastern Europe and the Soviet Union" of 16 December 1991 and the "Common Position for the recognition of the Yugoslav Republics" of 17 December 1991. While the first declaration underlined importance of commitment to democracy and international law norms in general, the second one requested Yugoslav republics wishing to gain recognition of their independence to accept provisions of international law protecting human rights as well as national minorities rights. The requirement for guarantees for minority rights was the result of a concern that independence of Yugoslav republics may represent a threat to ethnic minorities in the region, particularly in the case of Serbs of Croatia and Serbs of Bosnia and Herzegovina, and believe that credible guarantees may prevent incentives for further violent confrontations. European Community therefore decided to use the question of conditional recognition of independence as a tool to deescalate situation with conditional recognition offer being limited exclusively to established Yugoslav federal units (republics) in their administrative borders and explicitly discouraged in case of new secessionist regions (Republic of Serbian Krajina, Republika Srpska, Republic of Kosova or Croatian Republic of Herzeg-Bosnia).

== Post-Yugoslavia developments ==
The former Yugoslav constituent republics of Slovenia (2004) and Croatia (2013) have joined the European Union as independent states, North Macedonia, Serbia and Montenegro have been negotiating their accession since 2020, 2012 and 2010 respectively. Bosnia and Herzegovina applied in 2016, and was granted candidate status in 2022. Partially recognised Kosovo is recognised as a potential candidate for membership and formally applied to join the EU in 2022. Numerous politicians, academics, and public persons commented on the alleged missed opportunity of Yugoslav EEC membership, including Stjepan Mesić, Kiro Gligorov, Milorad Dodik, Tvrtko Jakovina, Claudio Gerardini, Vuk Drašković, Vladislav Jovanović, and Cornelius Adebahr.

== See also ==

The European Union has made a commitment to accept the countries of the Western Balkans as full EU members.
- Group of Nine
- Accession of Bosnia and Herzegovina to the European Union
- Accession of Croatia to the European Union
- Accession of North Macedonia to the European Union
- Accession of Montenegro to the European Union
- Accession of Kosovo to the European Union
- Accession of Slovenia to the European Union
- Accession of Serbia to the European Union
- European Union Association Agreement

=== Pre-1957 History ===
- Percentages agreement
- Tito–Stalin Split
- Paasikivi–Kekkonen doctrine

=== Related concepts and events ===
- European Neighbourhood Policy
- Inner Six
- Ostpolitik
- The Alps-Adriatic Working Group
- Yugoslavia and the Non-Aligned Movement
