= Germany–Slovenia relations =

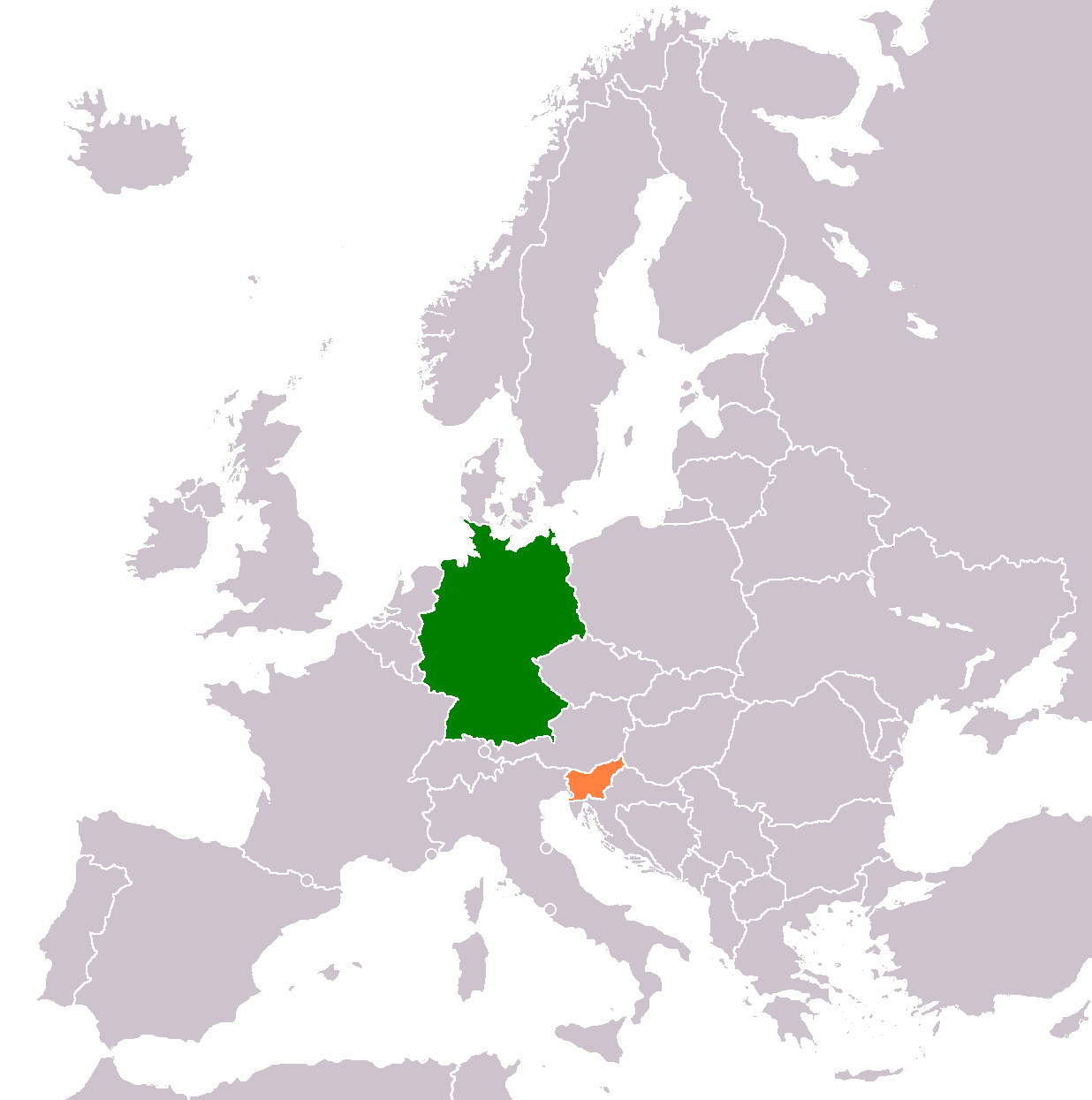

- Germany: Slovenia

Germany–Slovenia relations are the foreign relations between Germany and Slovenia. Germany–Slovenia state relations are good and harmonious. Both countries established diplomatic relations on 15 January 1992. Germany has an embassy in Ljubljana and Slovenia has an embassy in Berlin and a general consulate in Munich. Both countries are full members of the Council of Europe, the European Union and NATO.

== Establishment of relations ==
Germany officially recognized Slovenia, along with Croatia, on December 23, 1991. Germany's unilateral recognition of Slovenia, which came earlier than from the other members of the European Community, was the subject of much controversy and debate.

During the first years of Slovenian independence, Germany was a strong advocate for the self-determination of Slovenes, and instituted a comprehensive consulting and support program for the promotion of democratization and market reform process in Slovenia. It also supported Slovenian accession to the EU and NATO.

== Bilateral visits ==
There are more than 50,000 Slovenes living in Germany and more than 50,000 Germans living in Slovenia. A number of high-level visits have strengthened the friendly relations, e.g. Chancellor Gerhard Schröder visited Ljubljana on 26 June 2001, on the occasion of the 10th anniversary of Slovenian independence; from 25 until 27 March 2003, Wolfgang Thierse, the Bundestag President, visited Ljubljana, Celje and Koper, and Federal President Johannes Rau was in advance of the meeting of the Central and Eastern European Presidents from 29 May until 1 June 2002 in Bled, Ljubljana and Maribor. Since Slovenian accession to the NATO and the EU in spring 2004, the partnership of the two countries has reached a new level. More highlights of the two nations' diplomatic relations include the visit of the CSU group to the German Bundestag with the Federal Economics Minister Glos and Federal Agriculture Minister Seehofer on 11 July 2006 in Ljubljana and the participation of Chancellor Angela Merkel at the official ceremony of the Slovenian government to adopt the euro on 15 January 2007 in the Slovenian capital.

== Resident diplomatic missions ==
- Germany has an embassy in Ljubljana.
- Slovenia has an embassy in Berlin and an consulate-general in Munich.
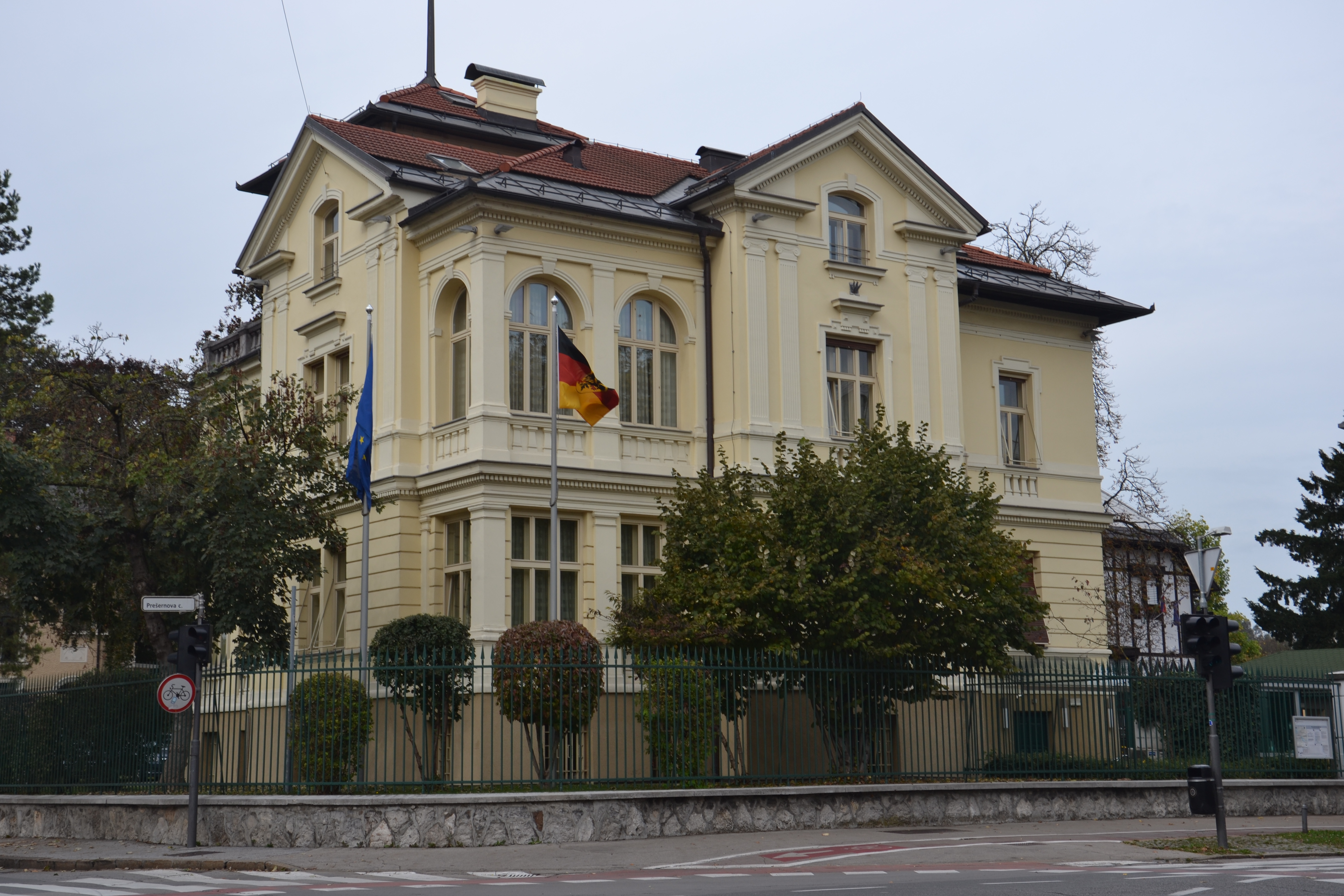
Embassy of Germany in Ljubljana

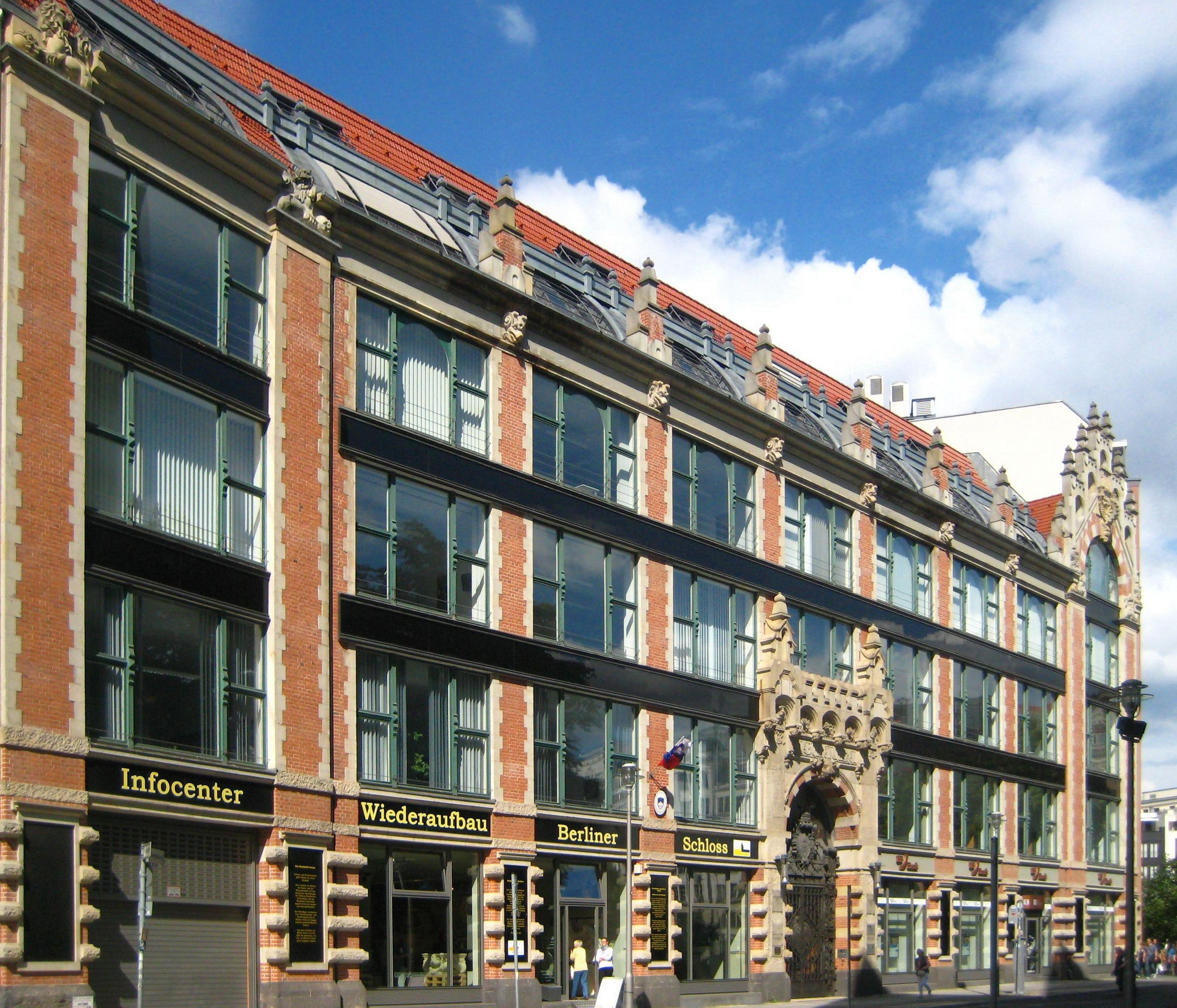
Embassy of Slovenia in Berlin

== See also ==
- Foreign relations of Germany
- Foreign relations of Slovenia
- Germany–Yugoslavia relations
- Accession of Slovenia to the European Union
