= Yugoslav accession to the Tripartite Pact =

1941 agreement between the Axis powers and Yugoslavia

- Signed: 25 March 1941
- Location: Belvedere, Vienna, Ostmark, Germany
- Signatories: (Nazi Germany) Joachim von Ribbentrop; (Kingdom of Yugoslavia) Dragiša Cvetković
- Parties: (Nazi Germany) (Empire of Japan) (Kingdom of Italy) Axis powers; Kingdom of Yugoslavia

On 25 March 1941, Yugoslavia signed the Tripartite Pact with the Axis powers. The agreement was reached after months of negotiations between Germany and Yugoslavia and was signed at the Belvedere in Vienna by Joachim von Ribbentrop, German foreign minister, and Dragiša Cvetković, Yugoslav Prime Minister. Pursuant to the alliance, the parties agreed that the Axis powers would respect Yugoslav sovereignty and territorial integrity, including the Axis refraining from seeking permission to transport troops through Yugoslavia or requesting any military assistance.

Yugoslav accession to the Tripartite Pact (Serbo-Croatian: Тројни пакт / Trojni pakt) was short-lived, however. On 27 March 1941, two days after the agreement had been signed, the Yugoslav government was overthrown when the regency led by Prince Paul was ended and King Peter II fully assumed power. On 6 April 1941, less than two weeks after Yugoslavia had signed onto the Tripartite Pact, the Axis invaded Yugoslavia. By 18 April, the country was conquered and occupied by the Axis powers.

== Background ==
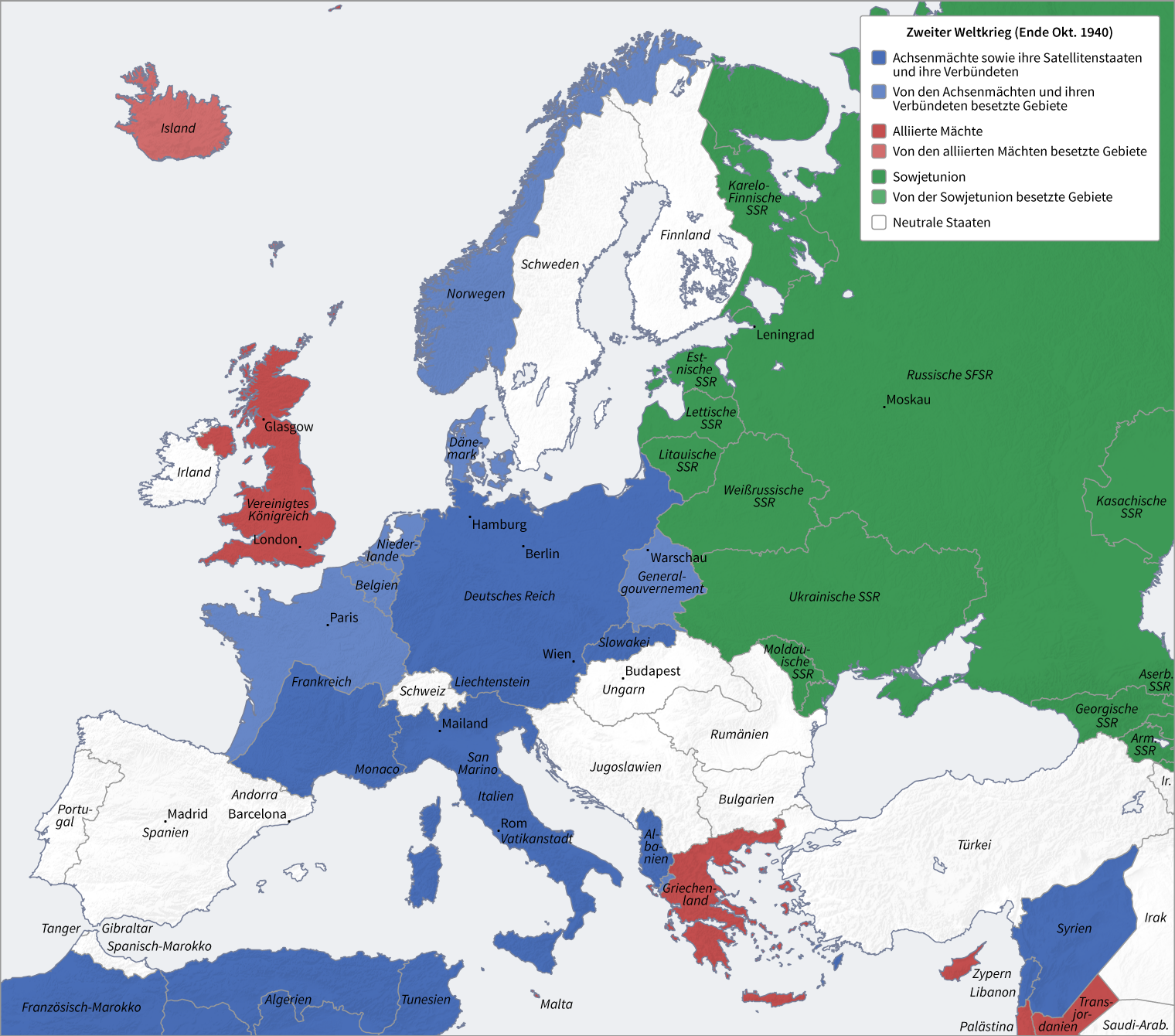
Political map of Europe at the end of October 1940 (in German).

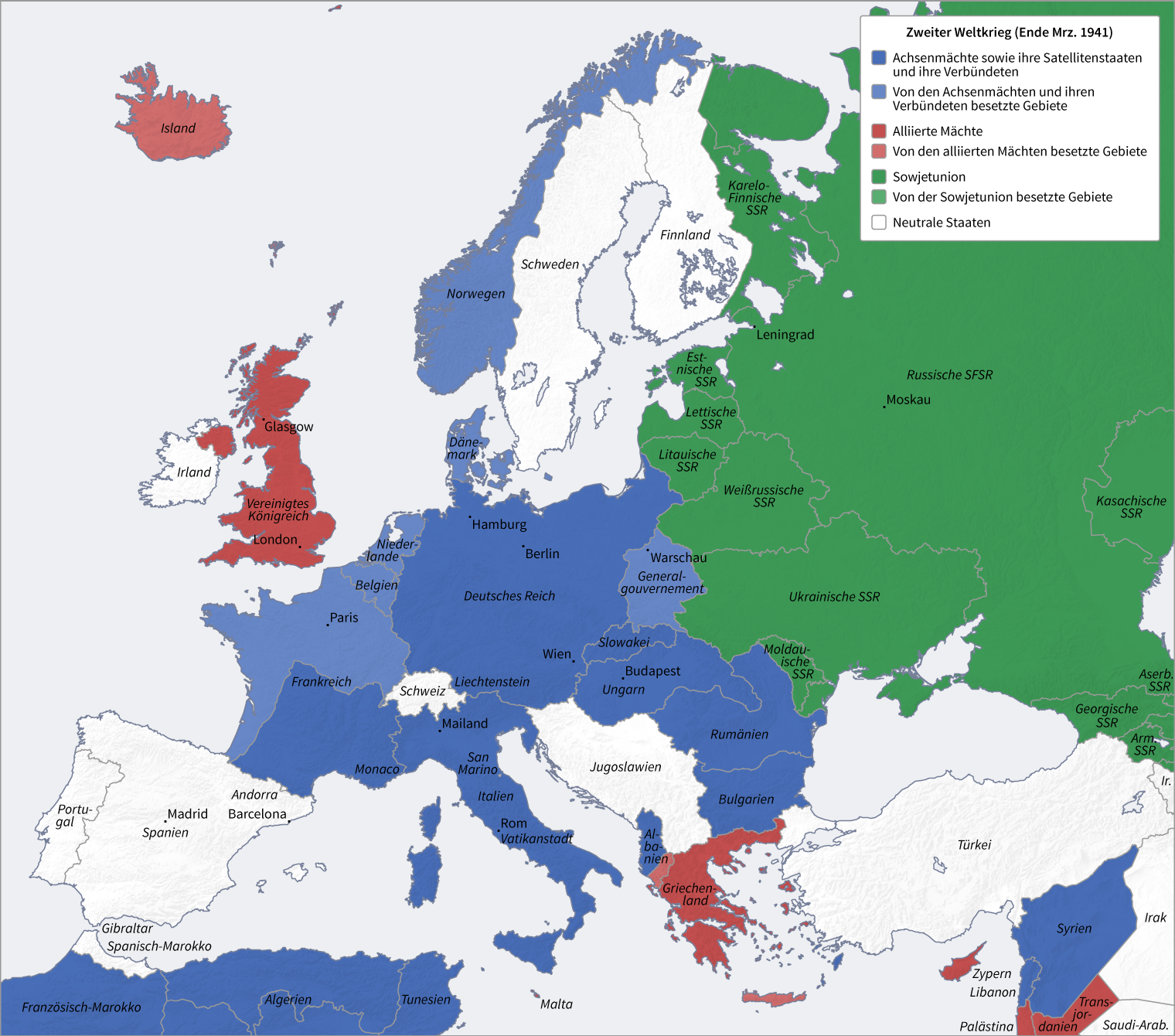
Political map of Europe at the end of March 1941 (in German).

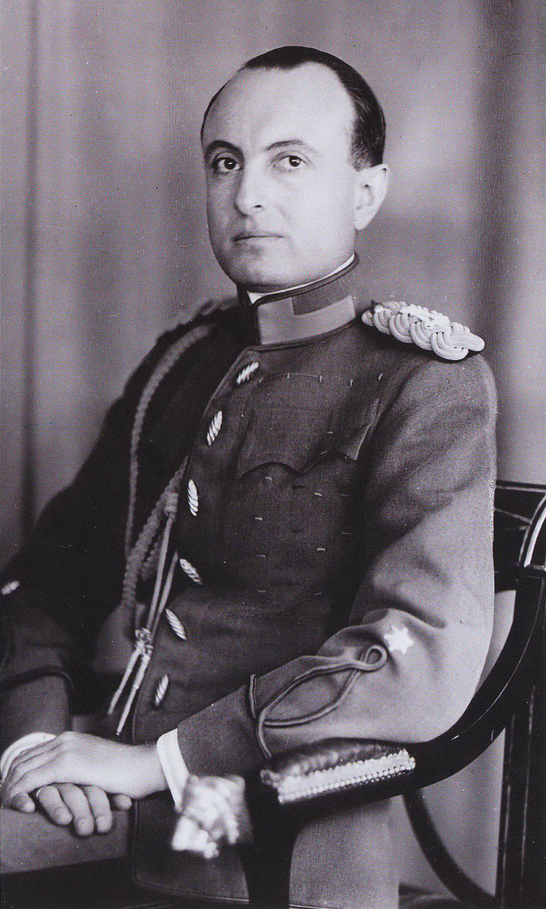
Prince Paul of Yugoslavia.

After the French armistice in June 1940, only the United Kingdom seemed to have any chance of winning a fight against the Germans, with even it having a greater chance of negotiating a humiliating peace. Thus, the historian Vladislav Sotirović wrote that "no wonder British politicians and diplomats tried by all means, including military coups, to drag any neutral country into war on their side for a final victory against Hitler's Germany". Yugoslavia had been ruled as a dictatorship by the regent, Prince Paul, since the assassination of King Alexander I in 1934. After the 1938 Anschluss, the German annexation of Austria; the 1939 Italian occupation of Albania; and the accession of Hungary, Romania, and Bulgaria to the Axis Tripartite Pact from 20 November 1940 to 1 March 1941, Yugoslavia was bordered by Axis powers on all sides except the southern border with Greece. All of those factors, combined with traditional Croatian separatism, put Paul in a great psychological, political, and patriotic dilemma: it was becoming impossible to resist Hitler's diplomatic pressures and concrete political offers for Yugoslavia's accession to the pact. Paul could no longer stall since Hitler was in a hurry to start the German invasion of the Soviet Union. Also, the potential of Croatian betrayal during a German invasion was Germany's main argument during these negotiations.

In the spring of 1941, Yugoslavia could rely only on Britain, which had more economic and population resources than Germany because of its colonies in the British Empire. Yugoslavia needed quick military aid, which Britain could offer, if the former rejected the pact.

Paul was pro-British and himself a relative of British King George VI. Since Paul gave the impression that he would rather resign than turn his back on Britain, Hitler viewed him as a British puppet in the Balkans.

There was also the perceived risk of a Communist fifth column because of the Molotov–Ribbentrop Pact, which made General Milan Nedić prepare a plan in December 1940 to open six internment camps for Communists if it was necessary. Nedić also proposed that the Yugoslav Army take Thessaloniki before Italian troops could do so after the November 1940 Italian invasion of Greece since the loss of that port would make eventual British military aid impossible if Yugoslavia was invaded.

The Greeks, however, held firm against the Italians and even entered Albania, where the Italian invasion had begun. Nedić's plan for the Communists was uncovered by a spy, the young officer Živadin Simić, in the War Ministry; he copied the two-page document, which was then quickly handed out in Belgrade by the Communists.

It was crucial for Hitler to solve the questions of Yugoslavia and Greece before he attacked the Soviet Union since he believed that Britain, which was, along with France, at war with Germany, would accept peace only when the Soviets could no longer threaten Germany. (Britain held the Molotov–Ribbentrop Pact as dishonest, volatile, and forced by the foreign situation.)

The invasion of the Soviet Union needed the Balkans to be pro-German, and the only unreliable countries in the region were Yugoslavia, the Serbs being traditional enemies of Germany, and Greece, which had been invaded by Italy on its own accord after the German annexation of Austria, but it became clear that Benito Mussolini could not manage in Greece on his own.

The British Army in Continental Europe was successfully fighting only in Greece. The military and political elimination of Greece and Yugoslavia, as potential British allies, would thus be extremely serious for Britain.

Seven German divisions were thus moved into Bulgaria, and permission for six divisions to cross Yugoslavia into Greece was sought from Paul. On 1 March 1941, Hitler compelled Paul to visit him personally in his favourite resort, in Berchtesgaden. They secretly met in Berghof, Hitler's residence, on 4 March. In an extremely uncomfortable discussion for Paul, Hitler said that after he would expel British troops from Greece, he would invade the Soviet Union in the summer to destroy Bolshevism.

Yugoslav historiography is mostly silent about the fact that Hitler proposed to Paul that a scion of the latter's Karađorđević dynasty become Emperor of Russia after German victory. That was hinted to be Paul himself, whose regency mandate would end on 6 September 1941, when Peter II would reach his majority and become the reigning king of Yugoslavia. However, the offer, which was more imaginary than realistic, was not crucial in influencing Paul's decision to accede to the Tripartite Pact on 25 March 1941 since it was Realpolitik that was the ultimate factor.

Paul had first addressed British diplomatic circles in Belgrade and London to solicit help and protection, but Britain offered no military aid to Yugoslavia, despite doing so for Greece. The British sought for a Yugoslav military engagement against Germany, which was then defeating Britain, and promised an adequate reward after their victory.

During the negotiations with Hitler, Paul feared that Britain would demand a formal public declaration of friendship with Britain that would only anger Germany but bring no good. Concrete British aid was out of the question, especially since Yugoslavia had bordered Germany since the annexation of Austria. The Yugoslav Army was inadequately armed and so would not stand a chance against Germany, which had won the Battle of France only a year earlier.

On 12 January 1941, British Prime Minister Winston Churchill informed Paul that Yugoslav neutrality was not enough. The German and British demands thus differed enormously since the Germans sought only neutrality and a nonaggression pact, but the British demanded open conflict. On 6 March, Yugoslav War Minister Petar Pešić, despite being supported by the British since he was anti-German, laid out the slim chances of Yugoslavia against Germany. He stressed that the Germans would quickly take over the northern Yugoslavia with Belgrade, Zagreb, and Ljubljana, and then force the Yugoslav Army to retreat into the Dinaric Alps, where the army could hold out for no more than six weeks before it surrendered since there were not enough weapons, ammunition, and food.

Accordingly, the next day, Prime Minister Cvetković presented Yugoslavia's terms for signing the Pact to the German embassy in Belgrade:

- Respect of the political sovereignty and the territorial integrity of Yugoslavia.
- No military aid to Yugoslavia from any other country during the war.
- No transport of troops from any other country across Yugoslavia during the war.
- Consideration of Yugoslavia's interest in access to the Aegean Sea during the postwar political reorganisation of Europe.

== Negotiations ==
=== November 1940 ===
On 28 November 1940, Yugoslav Foreign Minister Aleksandar Cincar-Marković met with Hitler at Berghof. Hitler spoke of his plans of the "consolidation of Europe" and called for the conclusion of a nonaggression pact with Germany and Italy. Although the Yugoslav government agreed, Hitler immediately answered that it was not enough by not meeting the need for the improvement of relations with the Axis powers, and the question of Yugoslavia's accession to the Tripartite Pact needed to be discussed.

=== February 1941 ===
On 14 February 1941, Prime Minister Dragiša Cvetković and Foreign Minister Cincar-Marković met with Hitler, who insisted on a quick decision on accession since it was "Yugoslavia's last chance". Hitler had modified his demands by making special concessions to Yugoslavia that would include nothing "contrary to her military traditions and her national honour". Hitler did not demand the passage of troops, the use of railways, the installation of military bases or military collaboration with Yugoslavia and guaranteed its national sovereignty and territorial integrity. Finally, Hitler said, "What I am proposing to you is not in fact the Tripartite Pact". The Yugoslavs, however, managed to refuse and to delay the negotiations by noting that the decision lay in Prince Paul.

=== 4 March 1941 ===
On 4 March 1941, Prince Paul secretly met with Hitler at Berghof, where no obligations were taken, and Paul noted that he needed to consult with his advisers and government. Hitler had offered concrete guarantees and told Paul that the accession would have "a purely formal character".

=== 6–14 March 1941 ===
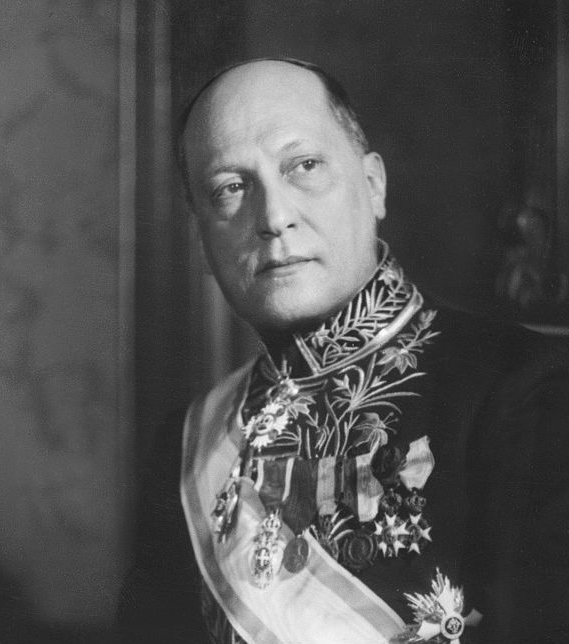
Aleksandar Cincar-Marković

On 6 March, the Crown Council was summoned, and Prince Paul informed of Hitler's demand for accession. Cincar-Marković presented the foreign situation and the problems related to Yugoslav accession, and Pešić portrayed the poor military situation. It was generally concluded from the discussions that accession would occur but that certain limitations and reserves were to be demanded from Germany, with Cincar-Marković in charge of drafting those points, which would be held in highest secrecy. The conference showed that the question of accession was very serious and, with respect to public opinion, very difficult.

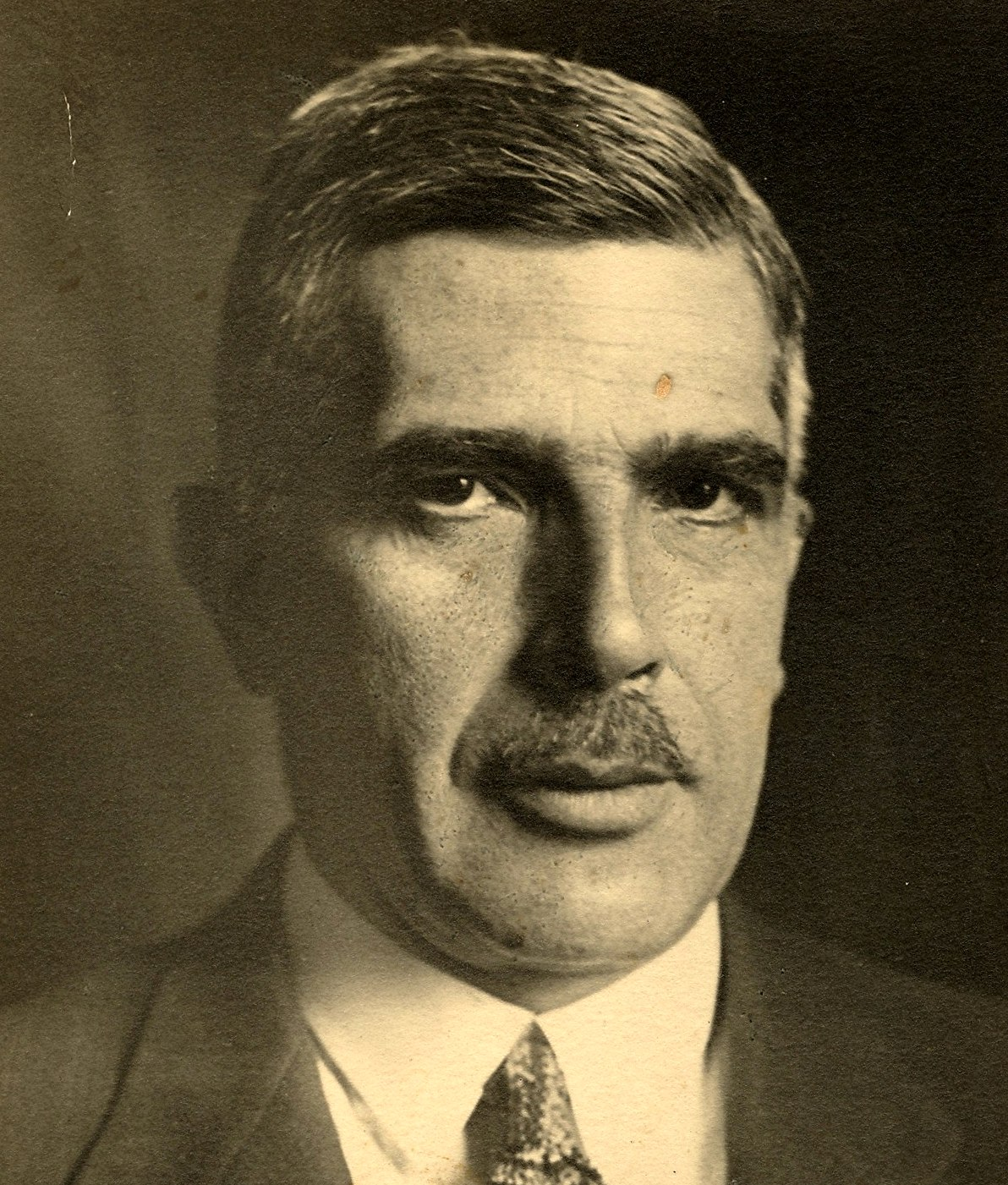
Viktor von Heeren

The next day, Cincar-Marković called Viktor von Heeren, the German minister in Belgrade, to the ministry and informed him of the Crown Council had agreed to Hitler's wish for Yugoslav accession to the pact. Simultaneously, an uneasiness, sparked by anti-Yugoslav manifestations and the negative articles in the media in Bulgaria in recent days, came to the fore.

Then, Ribbentrop was asked to clarify through Heeren whether Yugoslavia would receive a written statement from Germany and Italy if it acceded that Yugoslavia's sovereignty and territorial integrity would be respected; that no Yugoslav military aid would be requested and, during the creation of a new order in Europe, that the Yugoslav interest in free access to the Aegean Sea through Thessaloniki would be considered.

Cincar-Marković noted while he presented those points that there had already been a consensus on all questions. He then informed Paul that Ribbentrop had offered written guarantees. To clarify the situation, Cincar-Marković again asked for a precise answer from the German government to confirm those questions, which would help the Yugoslav government to implement the desired policy.

On 8 March, Heeren strictly confidentially contacted the German ministry. He stated that he had a strong impression that Yugoslavia had already decided that it would soon join the pact if the Germans either fulfilled the demands presented by Cincar-Marković or only slightly amended the German-Italian written statements. Heeren believed that Ribbentrop's incentive for another discussion with Paul was very appropriate and would be best held at the Brdo Castle, near Kranj.

In Belgrade's political and military circles, joining the German camp was generally discussed, but the thought that it would come in stages, with the help of government statements, prevailed and that by not acceding the pact would spare the population's hostile mood. The same day that Heeren contacted Ribbentrop about the latter's instructions, Heeren decided to see Cincar-Marković to state immediately that the German-Italian response to all three points had been positive. Heeren then warned Cincar-Marković the situation made it seem that it was in the best interest for Yugoslavia to decide on its accession as fast as possible.

On 9 March, continuing his phone conversation, Ribbentrop stated to Heeren from Fuschl am See that Germany was ready to recognise its respect of Yugoslav sovereignty and territorial integrity in a special note, which could be publicised by the Yugoslav government.

The Germans were ready to promise that no request on passage or transfer of troops would be made to Yugoslavia during the war, which could be publicised if the Yugoslav government thought that internal politics made it necessary. That and the announcement's timing could be discussed during the pact's conclusion.

=== 20–24 March 1941 ===
On 20 March, three Yugoslav ministers (Branko Čubrilović, Mihailo Konstantinović and Srđan Budisavljević) resigned in protest.

After consultations with British and American ministers, the Crown Council decided that the military situation was hopeless and voted 15–3 in favour of accession.

== Signing ==
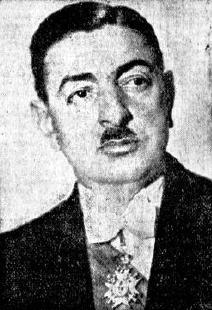
Dragiša Cvetković.

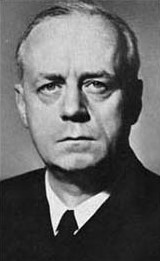
Joachim von Ribbentrop.

On 25 March, the pact was signed at the Belvedere, in Vienna, the main signatories being Ribbentrop and Cvetković. An official banquet was held, which Hitler complained felt like a funeral party. The German side had accepted the demands that had been made by Paul and Cvetković although both had actually hoped that Hitler would not accept them so that they could prolong the negotiations. The agreement stated that Germany would respect the sovereignty and the territorial integrity of Yugoslavia and that the Axis powers would neither seek permission to transport troops across Yugoslavia nor request any military assistance. The Yugoslav ambassador to Germany, Ivo Andrić, better known for being a writer, transcribed the document.

German radio later announced that "the Axis Powers would not demand the right of passage of troops or war materials" although the official document mentioned only troops and omitted any mention of war materials. Likewise, no pledge to consider giving Thessalonika to Yugoslavia appeared in the document.

== Aftermath ==
=== Demonstrations ===
The day after the signing of the pact, demonstrators gathered on the streets of Belgrade and shouted, "Better the grave than a slave, better a war than the pact" (Serbo-Croatian Latin: Bolje grob nego rob, Bolje rat nego pakt).

=== Coup d'état ===
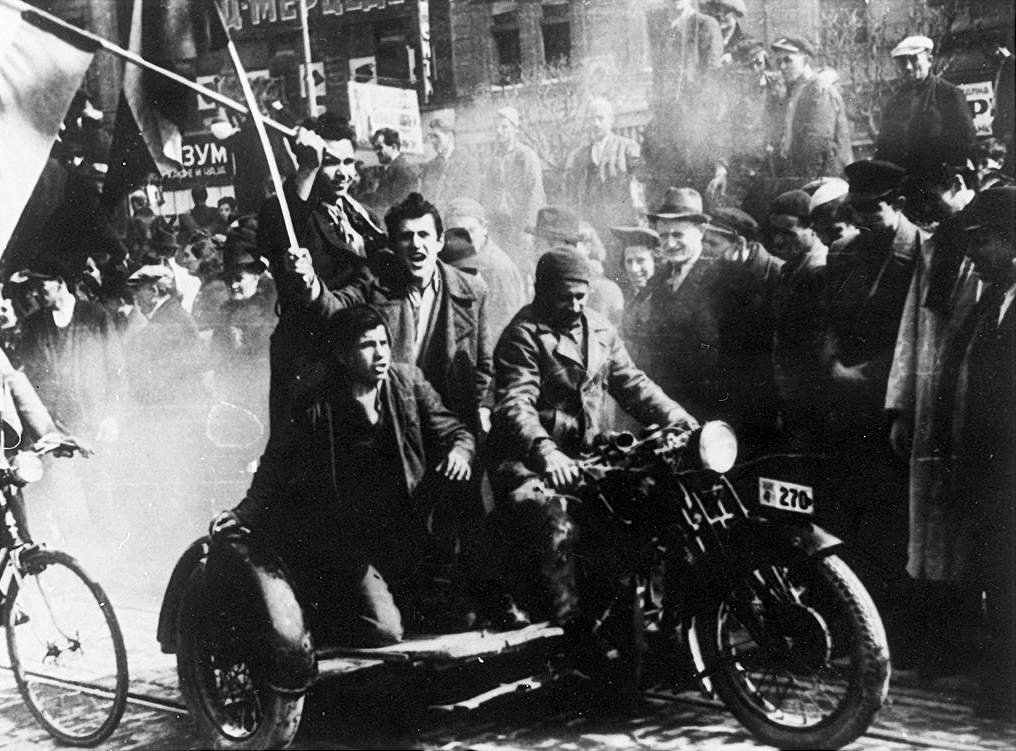
Belgraders demonstrate their support for breaking with the Tripartite Pact on 27 March, during the Yugoslav coup d'état.

On March 27, the regime was overthrown in a coup d'état that had British support. King Peter II was declared to be of age despite being only 17. The new Yugoslav government, under Prime Minister and General Dušan Simović, refused to ratify Yugoslavia's signing of the Tripartite Pact and started negotiations with the United Kingdom and the Soviet Union.

The enraged Hitler issued Directive 25 as an answer to the coup and attacked both Yugoslavia and Greece on April 6.

The German Air Force bombed Belgrade for three days and nights. German ground troops moved in, and Yugoslavia surrendered on April 17.

=== Legacy ===
In September 1945, the State Commission of the Socialist Federal Republic of Yugoslavia called Paul a "criminal", one reason being that he had caused Yugoslavia to join the Tripartite Pact. Serbia rehabilitated him on 14 December 2011.

== See also ==
- Germany–Yugoslavia relations

== Sources ==
- Presseisen, Ernst L. (December 1960). "Prelude to "Barbarossa": Germany and the Balkans, 1940–1941". Journal of Modern History. 32 (4). University of Chicago Press: 359–370. doi:10.1086/238616. JSTOR 1872611. S2CID 144699901.
- Ramet, Sabrina P. (2006). The Three Yugoslavias: State-building and Legitimation, 1918-2005. Indiana University Press. pp. 110–. ISBN 0-253-34656-8.
- Vucinich, Wayne S.; Tomasevich, Jozo (1969). Contemporary Yugoslavia: Twenty Years of Socialist Experiment. University of California Press. pp. 53–. GGKEY:5JR74ERLNET.
