= World War II reparations towards Yugoslavia =

Reparations were paid to Yugoslavia in the aftermath of World War II. The State Reparations Commission of the Yugoslav Government estimated the total war damages inflicted upon Yugoslavia in World War II at approximately US$47 billion (1938 values: $1 = 44 Yugoslav dinars; Germany – 36 billion, Italy – 10 billion, Hungary – 542 million, Bulgaria – 650 million).

== Cost of the War ==
According to the assessment of the Reparations Commission of the Federal People's Republic of Yugoslavia from 1945, the full amount of war damages, which Yugoslavia suffered during World War II, totaled US$46.9 billion from 1938, calculated upon the value at the outbreak of war (exchange rate: $1 = 44 dinars). From this sum, the German part is $35,858 billion. Through the International Reparation Agency, Yugoslavia was compensated the total sum of $35,786,118 which represents the value of the old dismantled German factories and other industrial facilities that were transported to Yugoslavia. In response to the summons of the UN Economic and Social Council, West Germany (FRG) paid for indemnification, from the title of a special agreement with Yugoslavia, totaling 8 million German marks, on behalf of the Yugoslav citizens, who were victims of medical experiments on living people during the war.

The amounts that were specified in the other international agreements with Germany from March 10, 1956, including 26 million German marks for insurance claims during and after World War II, were excluded from the reparations and are grounded on the implementation of the London Agreement on German External Debts from 1953.

== Treaties and agreements ==
The border between Yugoslavia and Italy was finally settled in the 1970s (see Treaty of Osimo).

Under the peace treaties from 1947, Italy was the obligee to reimburse Yugoslavia 125 million for war damages, Hungary 50 million and Bulgaria 25 million, all in U.S. dollars. There was no peace treaty with Germany nor was the total amount of Yugoslavia's war damages determined by a bilateral or multilateral agreement.

From the title of the Agreement on Friendship with Bulgaria of 1947, signed in Bled, the Yugoslav Government abandoned Bulgarian war indemnities through a unilateral act. Regardless of the fact that in July 1992 the National Assembly of the Republic of Serbia promulgated the Declaration on the Annulation of the Decision on Absolving Bulgaria of Compensation for War Damages, there was no legal title under which the question of war damages inflicted by Bulgaria could be raised.

The questions of war compensation, as they were specified in the peace treaties from 1947 with Italy and Hungary, were finally resolved through bilateral agreements of Yugoslavia with Italy (1954) and Hungary (1956).

Negotiations between the delegations of SFRY and FRG, as well as the Tito-Brandt talks, resulted in the harmonization of the Protocol on Monetary Relief in 1972 (unpublished) and the Agreement on the Approbation of Monetary Relief in 1974 totaling one billion German marks under firmly favorable terms. Yugoslavia paid off two smaller installments and the payments were reprogrammed and postponed several times.

There are some controversies with regard to the interpretation of the legal nature of this agreement. An analysis of this matter points to a typical bilateral onus contract, taking into account the title of the agreement as well as the provisions on multiple matters, including the object of the agreement, parties, amount of credit, interest rate, terms of use, paying the credit off and deciding on which party would enforce this agreement.

However, in the introduction of the Agreement from 1974 it was declared that "in terms of the approval expressed in the Communiqué anent the visit of Chancellor Brandt to Yugoslavia, the remaining open questions from the past should be resolved through long-term cooperation in the economic and other fields with the objective to definitely fulfill this consensus". This was an indirect way to associate the credit with the reparations through the so-called Tito-Brandt Brioni Formula.

For almost two decades the Yugoslav public was not aware of the existence of the 1973 Aide Mémoire, or position paper (a declaration of the Yugoslav Government), which was the condition of the German negotiators for this credit. The existence of the Aide Mémoire was also concealed in the statement of the Federal Secretariat of Foreign Affairs from January 1990, which was issued due to a series of public requests and inquiries of the deputies of both federal and state assemblies on the payment for war damages.

The content of the Aide Mémoire is as follows:

"In principle, the Government of SFRY accepts the proposal of the Government of FRG to compensate the indemnification of Yugoslav victims of Nazi repression in the total sum of one billion German marks in terms of monetary relief (Kapitalhilfe).

On the occasion of making this decision, the Government of SFRY takes into account the good faith, which was formed through the progressive and fruitful cooperation amongst SFRY and FRG, as well as the interests of the two countries to successfully and universally enhance their relations, what without doubt represents a contribution for broader international cooperation.

The Government of SFRY understands that the aforementioned credit shall be given under the most favorable terms, which are provided for credits of this kind. These means shall not be subject to any objects."

As maintained by Willy Brandt, the so-called Brioni Formula is an "indirect solution" for the payment of reparations through long-term economic cooperation; because of this the President of SFRY Josip Broz Tito and his coworkers gave their consent. Prior to this and at that time the ongoing negotiations, on indemnification of the victims of Nazi repression, agreed upon the number 950 thousand. In reality, it was much larger considering the victims in occupied Yugoslavia and beyond it, and especially in the so-called Independent State of Croatia. There was a possibility that Yugoslavia could receive 2,200 German marks per victim, which would total over 2 billion marks. This would be the implementation of the so-called French model, in accordance with what FR Germany already in the 1960s paid the victims of the other countries, especially Western countries (Israel and the Jewish victims were indemnified earlier).

In the place of such direct remedies, as it was the case with the other countries, a credit of 1 billion with the obligation to pay back was received at the insistence of Germany and by means of the enforcement of the so-called Brioni Formula.

== See also ==
- Germany–Yugoslavia relations
