= East Germany–Yugoslavia relations =

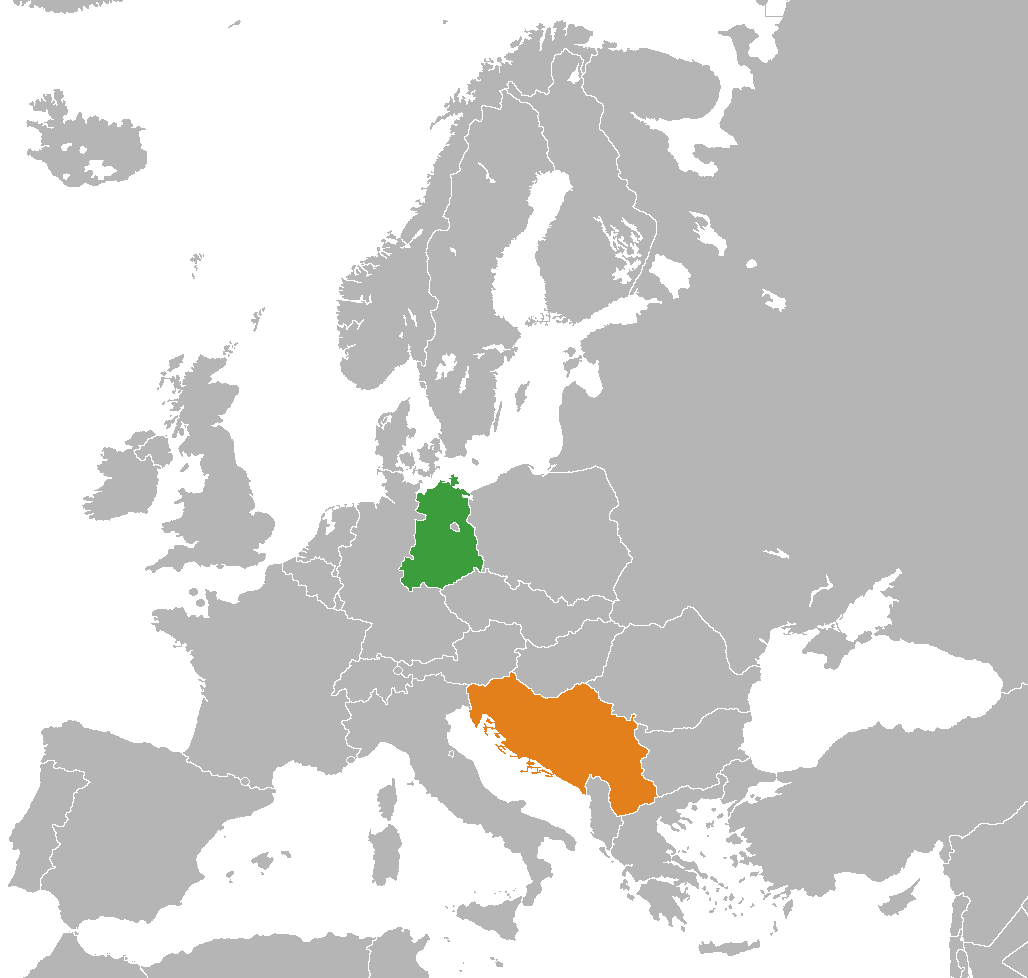

- East Germany: Yugoslavia

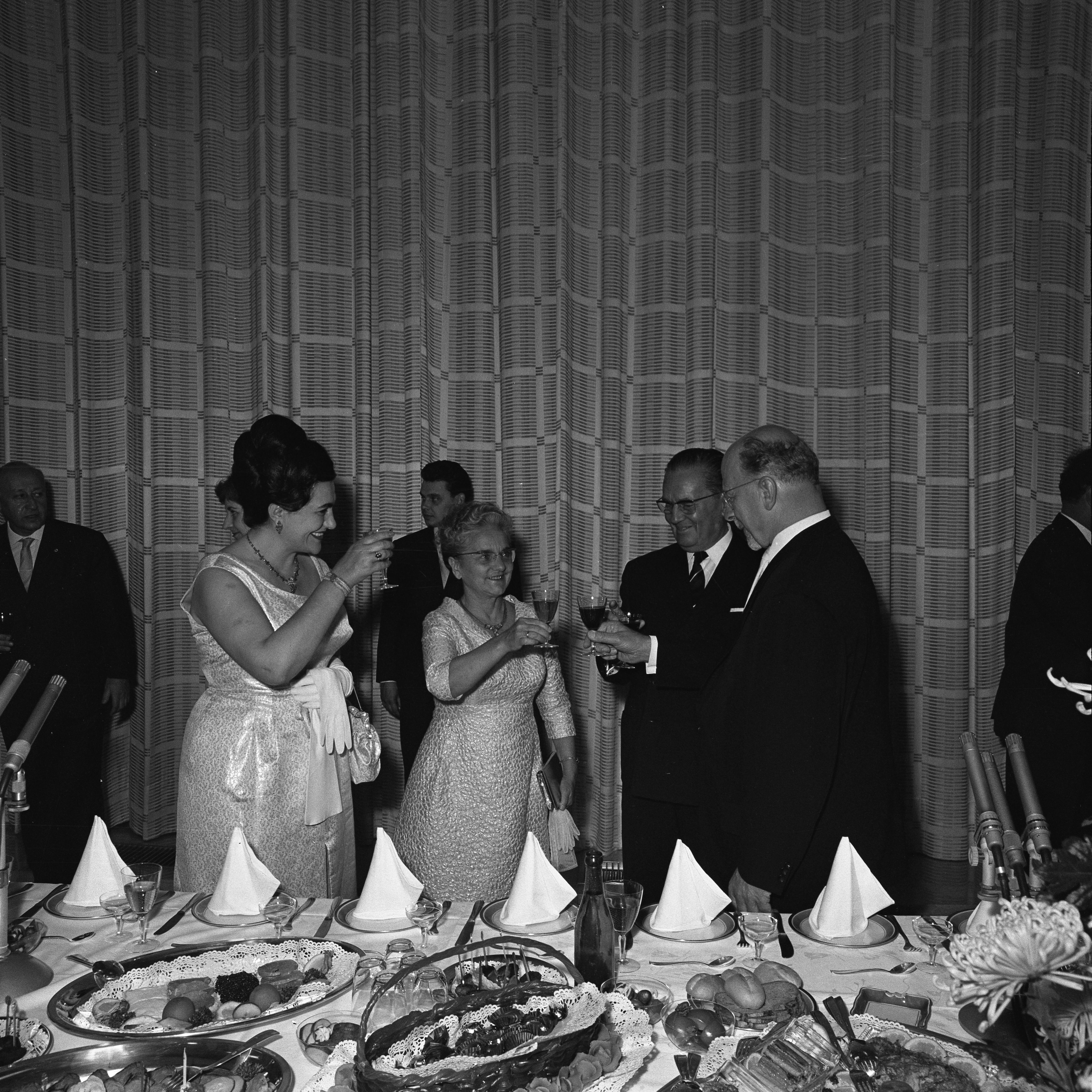
Walter Ulbricht and Josip Broz Tito with their wives Lotte Ulbricht and Jovanka Broz in East Berlin (8 June 1965).

East Germany–Yugoslavia relations are historical foreign and bilateral relations between the German Democratic Republic and the Socialist Federal Republic of Yugoslavia, both of which are now former states. Yugoslavia recognized East Germany on 15 October 1957. Decision to recognize East Germany pushed West Germany to apply the Hallstein Doctrine for the first time in history, limiting relations almost exclusively to the economics field for eleven years (until 1968) until the initiation of Ostpolitik. At the time, Yugoslav citizens were one of the largest groups of Gastarbeiter. A significantly smaller Yugoslav community lived in East Berlin, mostly as diplomatic and economic cooperation representatives. Yugoslavia recognized East Germany as part of its efforts to improve relations with the Soviet Union after the 1948 Tito–Stalin split. At the time, the 1955 Belgrade declaration was signed and Yugoslavia verbally supported the 1956 Soviet intervention in Hungary. This support was diametrically opposite to future Belgrade's strong opposition to the 1968 Warsaw Pact invasion of Czechoslovakia which led to a second rapprochement between Yugoslavia and the Western Bloc.

During the September 1964 official visit to the People's Republic of Bulgaria (conducted by train), Chairman of the East German State Council Walter Ulbricht unofficially visited Belgrade where he met with President of Yugoslavia Josip Broz Tito. Contrary to countries of the Eastern Bloc, the Yugoslav State Security Administration never developed substantial cooperation with the East German Stasi due to continual ideological and political antagonism between Belgrade and East Berlin.

== See also ==
- Yugoslavia–European Communities relations
- Death and state funeral of Josip Broz Tito
- East Germany at the 1984 Winter Olympics
- Hotel Panorama (Oberhof, Germany)
- Germany–Yugoslavia relations
