= Israel–Slovenia relations =

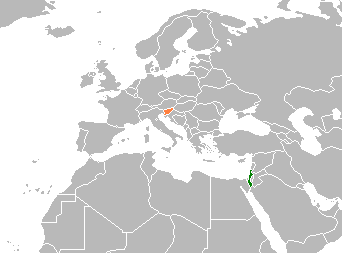

- Israel: Slovenia

Diplomatic mission
- Embassy of Israel, Ljubljana: Embassy of Slovenia, Tel Aviv

Israel and Slovenia established diplomatic relations on 28 April 1992. Israel opened its embassy in Slovenia in September 2026 in Ljubljana, while Slovenia has had an embassy in Tel Aviv since 1 August 1994.

== History ==
In 1998, Israel and Slovenia signed an agreement on promotion and protection of investments which entered into force in 1999, and in 2007, Israel and Slovenia signed an agreement on the avidness of double taxation which entered into force in the same year. In 2006 the President of the Republic of Slovenia Janez Drnovšek visited Israel, and in 2010 the President of the State of Israel Shimon Peres visited Slovenia. In 2020, Slovenia designated Hezbollah as a terrorist organization. In 2021, Israeli paratroopers parachuted into Slovenia to honor poet and anti-Nazi fighter Hannah Szenes. In 2024, former prime minister and opposition leader Janez Janša visited Israel and promised to relocate the Slovenian embassy to Jerusalem should he become prime minister again.

On 17 July 2025, the Slovenian government designated Israeli National Security Minister Itamar Ben Gvir and Finance Minister Bezalel Smotrich "persona non grata" over their roles in human rights violations against Palestinians. On 30 July, Slovenia announced a complete ban on the import, export, and transit of arms and military equipment to and from Israel.

On 25 September 2025, The Slovenian government formally bans Israeli prime minister Benjamin Netanyahu from entering the country, linking the ban to the International Criminal Court arrest warrant out for Netanyahu.

On 3 June 2026, an Israir flight bound for Ljubljana was diverted to Zagreb after Slovenian authorities denied it permission to land. Israir CEO Uri Sirkis alleged that the decision was politically motivated and described it as a violation of European Union aviation agreements. The incident prompted protests from Israeli officials, including the Foreign Ministry. The day after, Janez Janša assumed his role as Prime Minister and ordered the removal of the Palestinian flag from the government building. Shortly after, Israeli Foreign Minister Gideon Sa'ar announced that Israel would open an embassy in Ljubljana, its first resident diplomatic mission in Slovenia. All sanctions on Israel, including the arms embargo, travel bans on Israeli politicians, and bans on Jewish imports from Judea and Samaria, were lifted. On 27 June 2026, Janša reiterated to Israeli media his intention that the Slovenian embassy to Israel in Tel Aviv would be relocated to Jerusalem. President Nataša Pirc Musar, as well as the confidence and supply party Resni.ca, voiced opposition to the relocation.

In July 2026, Israel announced Ruth Cohen-Dar as their first-ever resident ambassador to Slovenia. On 9 September 2026, Israel's embassy in Ljubljana was officially inaugurated during a visit by Israel's Foreign Minister, Gideon Sa'ar.

== Trade ==
Trade between Israel and Slovenia is influenced by the EU-Israel Free Trade Agreement of 1995.

Israel–Slovenia trade in millions USD-$
	Israel imports Slovenia exports	Slovenia imports Israel exports	Total trade value
2023	96.4	739.8	836.2
2022	119.7	578.7	698.4
2021	92.2	366.1	458.3
2020	68.5	326.5	395
2019	63.8	336.8	400.6
2018	74.2	417.1	491.3
2017	323	374	697
2016	695.1	251.7	946.8
2015	107.5	268	375.5
2014	157.3	153.5	310.8
2013	167.5	142.9	310.4
2012	127.9	149.8	277.7
2011	224.5	170	394.5
2010	196	150.9	346.9
2009	122.4	124.4	246.8
2008	65.4	125.2	190.6
2007	97.1	100.3	197.4
2006	38.7	48.9	87.6
2005	31.6	65.8	97.4
2004	27.6	24.3	51.9
2003	27.1	31.3	58.4
2002	22	30.4	52.4

== Jewish community ==
The Jewish community of Slovenia is small with approximately 100 to 300 members, most of whom live in Ljubljana. A synagogue was opened in 2021.

== Slovenian criticism of Israel and antisemitism ==
In 2016, Slovenian supermarket chain Mercator imposed a boycott on Israeli products after pressure from local Boycott, Divestment and Sanctions activists. The decision was reversed two days later, following a protest from the Israeli Foreign Ministry.

In February 2023, the Simon Wiesenthal Center sent a letter to president Nataša Pirc Musar expressing concern about what it called antisemitism expressed by journalists within the national public broadcaster Radiotelevizija Slovenija (RTV Slovenija), citing tweets accusing the Israeli government of apartheid and Jewish supremacy, with one tweet also praising Hamas.

In December 2024, the Slovenian public broadcaster RTV called for a ban on Israel from participating in the Eurovision Song Contest 2025.

== Slovenia Grove ==
Slovenia Grove (also known as the Bunker Grove) is a grove located in northern Israel. It is named after three bunkers built by the British during World War II to store bombs and ammunition for the RAF base in Ramat David. The British also planted the grove, which was intended to camouflage the bunkers. The Jewish National Fund and the Honorary Consul of Slovenia in Haifa developed and donated the grove.

== See also ==
- Foreign relations of Israel
- Foreign relations of Slovenia
- History of the Jews in Slovenia
