= Brazil–Serbia relations =

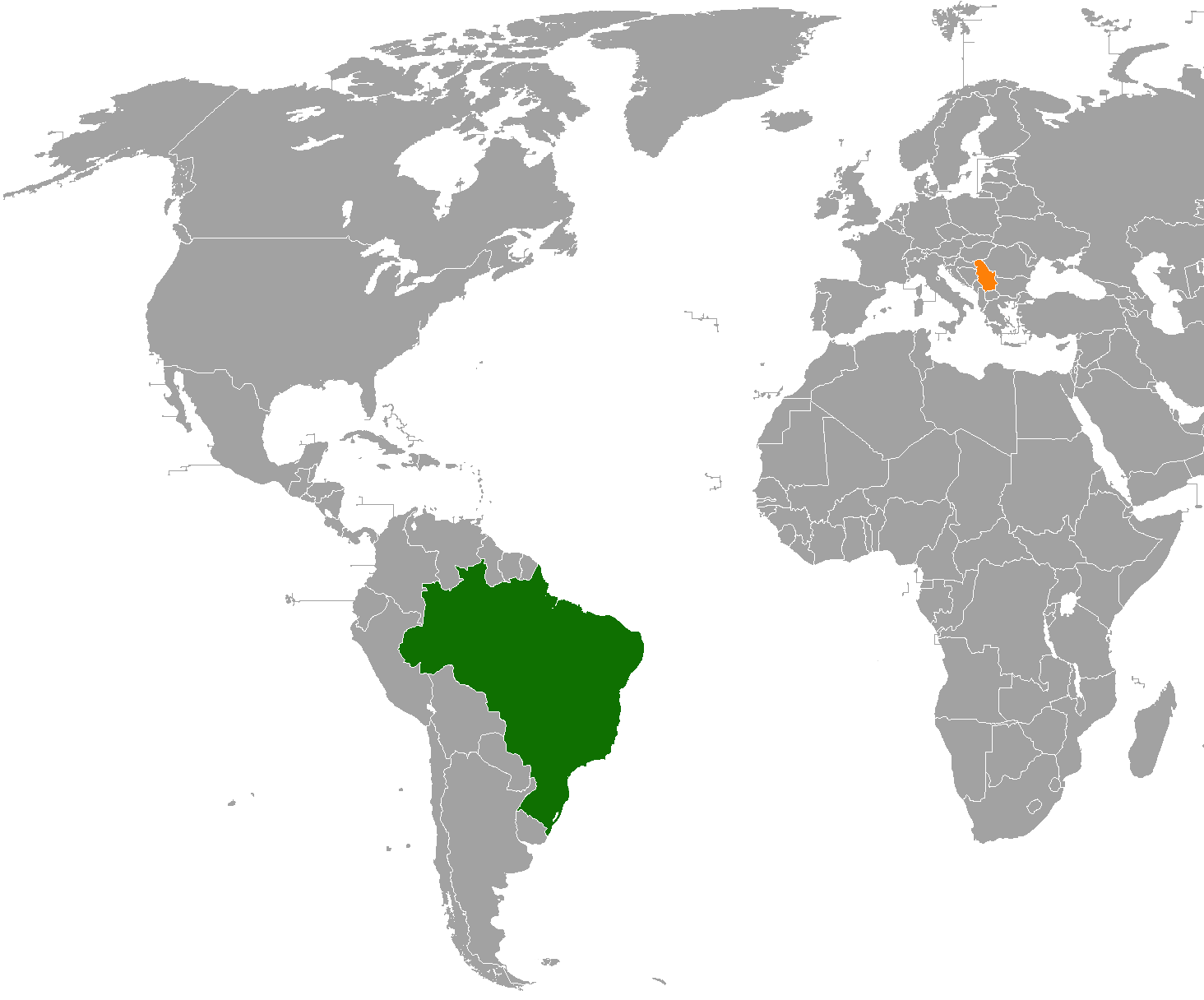
- Brazil: Serbia

Brazil and Serbia maintain diplomatic relations established between Brazil and Kingdom of Yugoslavia in 1938. From 1938 to 2006, Brazil maintained relations with the Kingdom of Yugoslavia, the Socialist Federal Republic of Yugoslavia (SFRY), and the Federal Republic of Yugoslavia (FRY) (later Serbia and Montenegro), of which Serbia is considered shared (SFRY) or sole (FRY) legal successor.

== Brazilian stance on Kosovo ==
Brazil does not recognize Kosovo as an independent state and has announced it has no plans to do so without an agreement with Serbia.

In 2008, the Brazilian government reaffirmed its belief that a peaceful solution for the issue of Kosovo must continue to be sought through dialogue and negotiation, under the auspices of the UN and the legal framework of UNSCR 1244. The Foreign Minister of Brazil, Celso Amorim, defended that Brazil should await a UNSC decision before defining its official position on the matter of Kosovo's independence. In 2009, Ambassador of Brazil to Serbia Dante Coelho de Lima stated that "our fundamental position is that we respect Serbia's territorial integrity. We supported Security Council resolution 1244, under which Kosovo is a part of Serbia. We also think that the principle of self-determination should not run counter to respect for international law". In a hearing at the International Court of Justice that same year, the Brazilian delegation said that the unilateral declaration of independence ignored not only the authority of the UNSC, but also the principle of protecting the territorial integrity of states. There is no basis to justify the unilateral declaration of independence in the UNSC Resolution 1244 because it predicted a solution agreed by both parties. Since such an agreement was not reached, the Kosovo dispute can be decided only by the UNSC.

== Economic relations ==
Brazil is Serbia's major trading partner in Latin America. Trade between two countries amounted to $174 million in 2022; Brazilian merchandise export to Serbia were about $112 million; Serbian exports were standing at $62 million.

Brazilian largest pharmaceutical company EMS acquired in 2017 Serbian second-largest pharmaceutical company Galenika.

== Resident diplomatic missions ==
- Brazil has an embassy in Belgrade.
- Serbia has an embassy in Brasília.
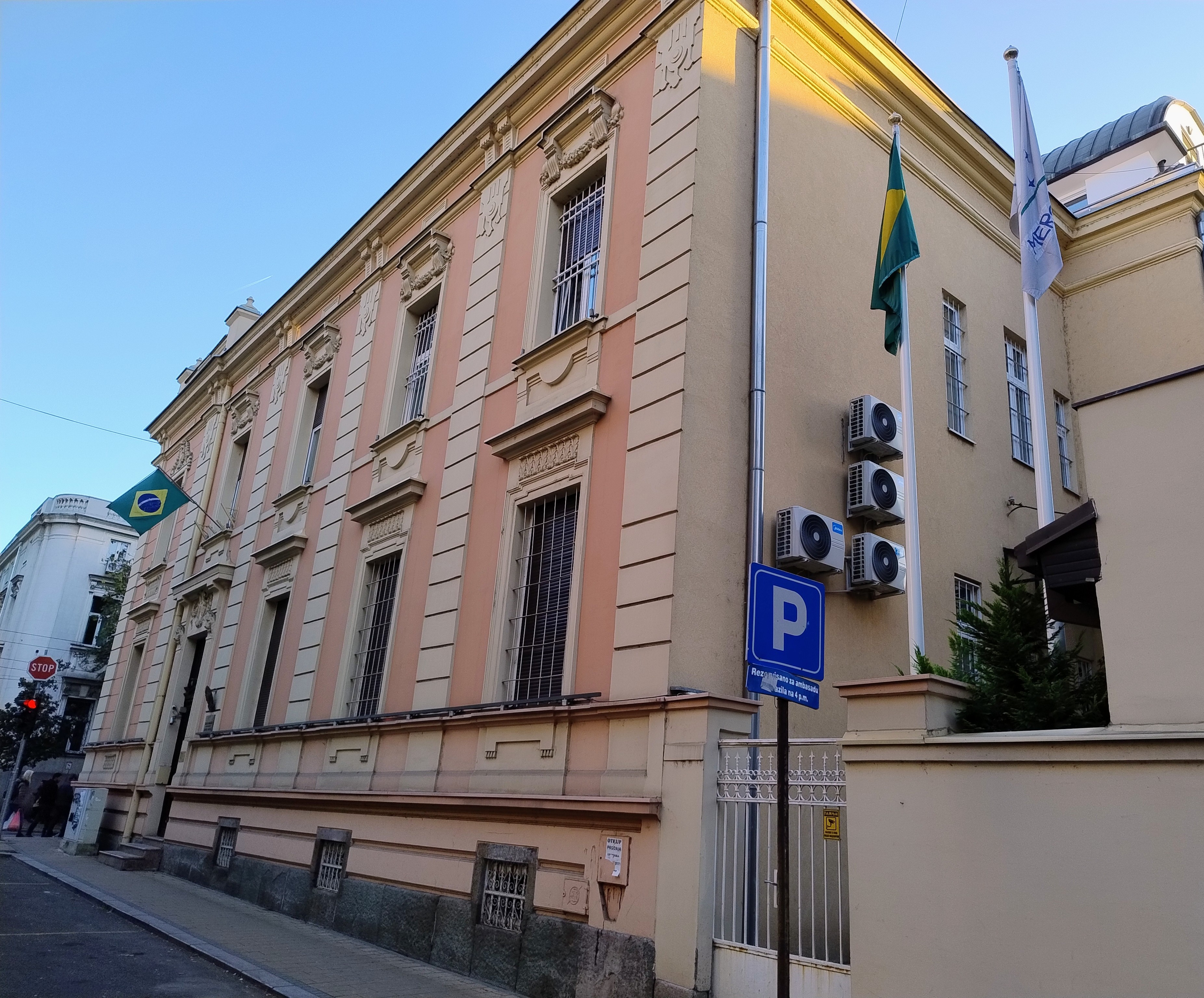
Embassy of Brazil in Belgrade

== See also ==
- Foreign relations of Brazil
- Foreign relations of Serbia
- Brazil–Yugoslavia relations
