= Italy–Yugoslavia relations =

Kingdom of Italy–Kingdom of Yugoslavia relations
- Italy: Yugoslavia

Italy–Yugoslavia relations
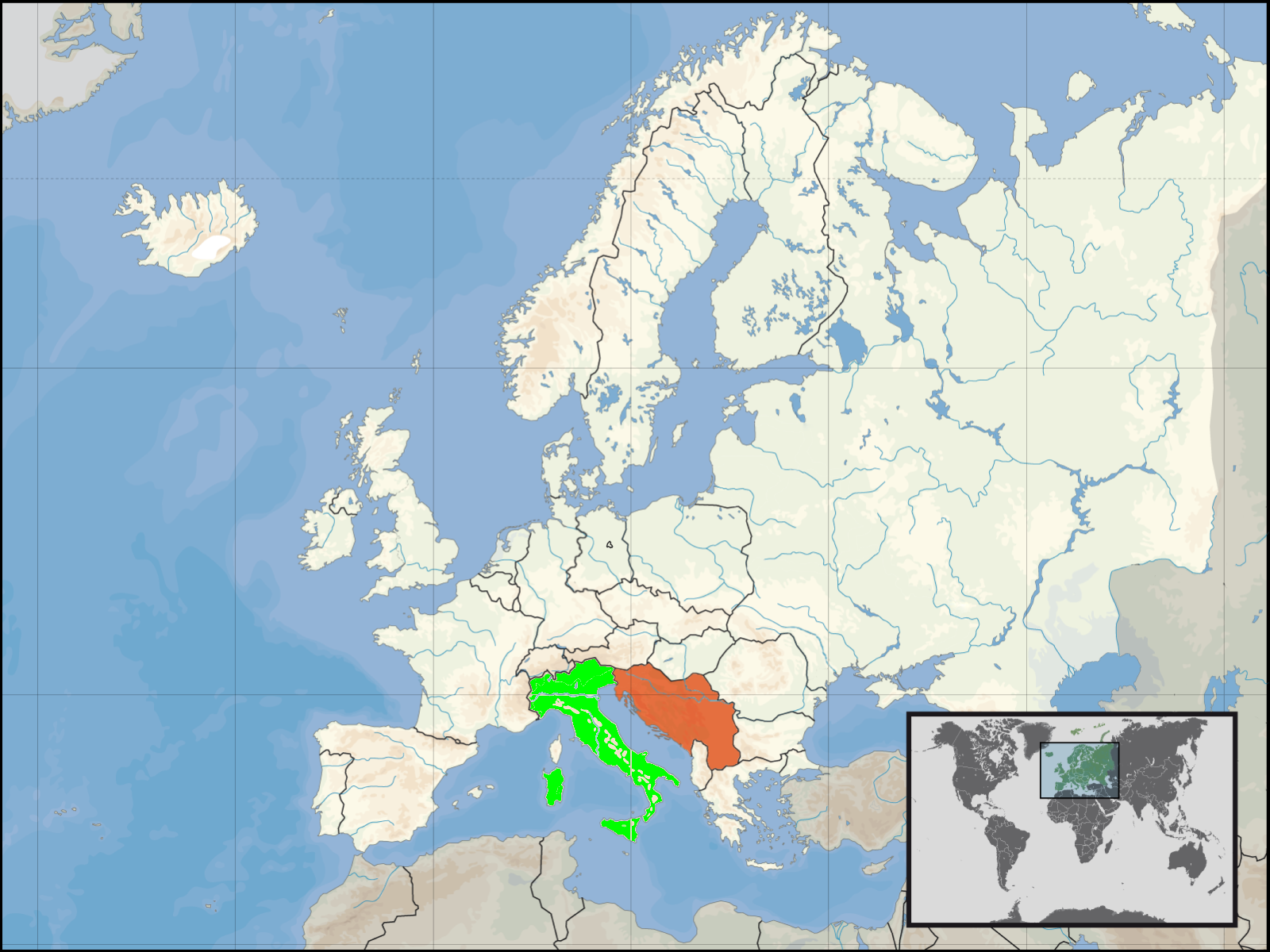

- Italy: Yugoslavia

Italy–Yugoslavia relations (Italian: Relazioni Italia-Jugoslavia; Serbo-Croatian: Odnosi Italije i Jugoslavije, Односи Италије и Југославије; Slovene: Odnosi med Italijo in Jugoslavijo; Macedonian: Односите Италија-Југославија) are the cultural and political relations between Italy and Yugoslavia in the 20th century, since the creation of Yugoslavia in 1918 until its dissolution in 1992. Relations immediately after the end of World War I, and shortly before the rise of fascism in Italy, were severely affected and constantly tense due to the dispute over Dalmatia and the city-port of Fiume (Rijeka). Relations during the interwar years were hostile because of Italian demands for Yugoslav territory, contributing to decision by Italy and Germany to invade Yugoslavia during World War II. After lingering tensions after the war over the status of the Free Territory of Trieste, relations improved during the Cold War.

== Interwar period (1918–40) ==
=== Border in Dalmatia ===
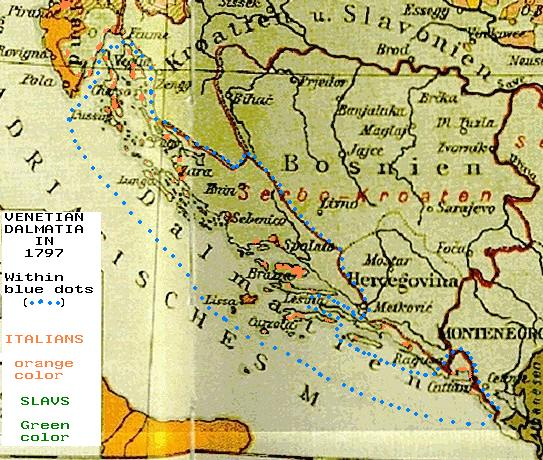
Austrian linguistic map from 1896. In green the areas where Slavs were the majority of the population, in orange the areas where Istrian Italians and Dalmatian Italians were the majority of the population. The boundaries of Venetian Dalmatia in 1797 are delimited with blue dots.

On 26 April 1915, the Kingdom of Italy signed the secret Treaty of London with members of the Triple Entente. According to the pact, Italy was to declare war against the Triple Alliance; in exchange, it was to receive the Julian March, northern Dalmatia and the protectorate over Albania.

In March 1918, Ante Trumbić, of the Yugoslav Committee and the Italian representative, Andrea Torre, signed an agreement which clearly stated that the future border between the Kingdom of Yugoslavia (the union of the Kingdom of Serbia and the State of Slovenes, Croats and Serbs) would be decided in a democratic way.

In November 1918, after the surrender of Austria-Hungary following the Armistice of Villa Giusti, Italy occupied militarily the Julian March, Istria, the Kvarner Gulf and Dalmatia, all Austro-Hungarian territories. On the Dalmatian coast, Italy established the Governorate of Dalmatia, which had the provisional aim of ferrying the territory towards full integration into the Kingdom of Italy, progressively importing national legislation in place of the previous one.

However, the Treaty of London was nullified in the Treaty of Versailles due to the objections of American president Woodrow Wilson. Italy received only the Julian March, the Dalmatian city of Zara (Zadar), as well as the islands of Cherso (Cres), Lussino (Lošinj) and Lagosta (Lastovo). A large number of Dalmatian Italians, (allegedly nearly 20,000), moved from the areas of Dalmatia assigned to Yugoslavia and resettled in Italy (mainly in Zara). Following the conclusion of World War I and the disintegration of Austria-Hungary, Dalmatia became part of the newly formed Kingdom of Serbs, Croats and Slovenes (later renamed the Kingdom of Yugoslavia).

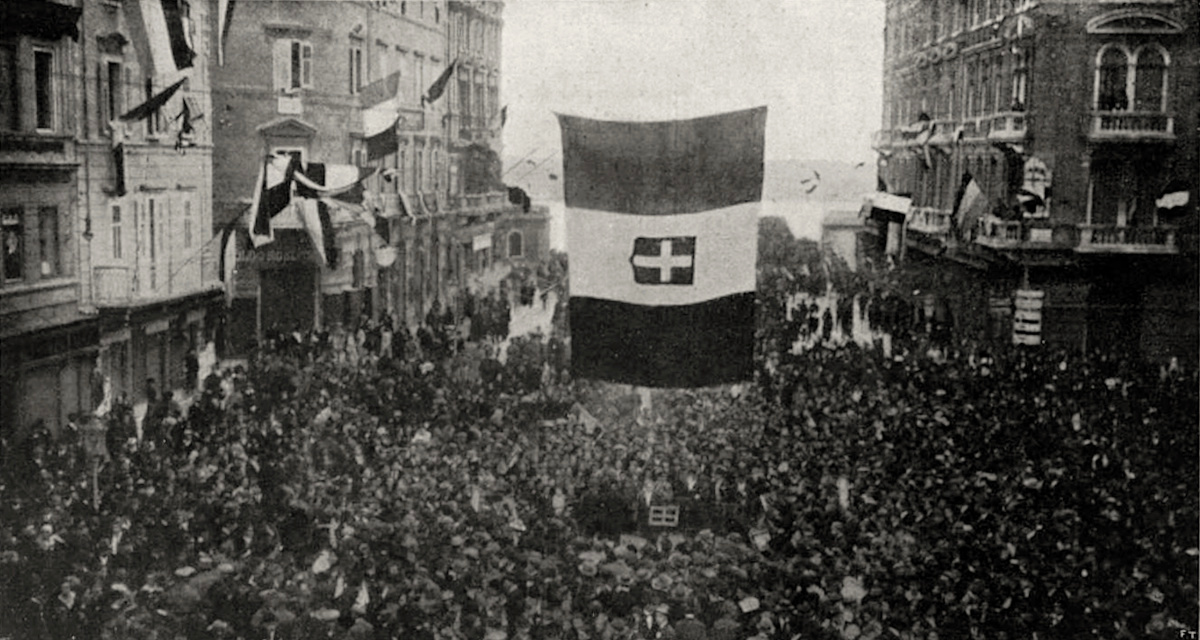
The birthday celebration of the Italian king Victor Emmanuel III in Fiume (Rijeka) on 11 November 1918

After the failure of a border agreement at the Paris Peace Conference, discussions continued between the Kingdom of Italy and the Kingdom of Yugoslavia. During 1920 the Italian government was under internal pressure to expand its borders as fair compensation for war victims and war debt. An example of this pressure was the publication of a forged letter purporting to be from Abraham Lincoln to Macedonio Melloni, in which Lincoln had apparently acknowledged all the coast between Venice and Cattaro as Italian national territory. Relations seemed to settle with the signing of the Treaty of Rapallo, the annexation by Italy of the Free State of Fiume and the evacuation of the Governorate of Dalmatia.

Relations with the Kingdom of Yugoslavia were severely affected and constantly remained tense, because of the dispute over Dalmatia and over the city-port of Fiume (Rijeka). The Italians claimed Fiume on the principle of self-determination, disregarding its mainly Slavic suburb of Sušak. It had become a free state according to the League of Nations, but was occupied by some Italian rebels led by the writer Gabriele d'Annunzio. In 1924 the city was divided between Italy and Yugoslavia (the Treaty of Rapallo). Fascism came to Italy in 1922. Their policies included nationalistic Italianization courses of action, under which minority rights were severely reduced.

In 1925, the two countries signed the Treaty of Nettuno, but it took until 1928 before it was ratified in the Yugoslav parliament, after the assassination of Stjepan Radić.

=== Albania issue ===
Greater Albania is the proposal of 4 "Albanian vilayets" of the League of Prizren as agreed after the Albanian revolt of 1912

Before becoming the Duce of Italy, Benito Mussolini had clearly stated his thinking about Yugoslavia. He was creating a difference towards Serbia in which "Italy will always have [a] friendly policy but with Yugoslavia she will have [a] good relationship only if she accept[s] that her destiny is [in the] Aegean and not [the] Adriatic Sea". The relationship between the two states ended after the signing of a friendship pact between the Kingdoms of Italy and Albania on 27 November 1926. This was the reason Yugoslavian minister of foreign affairs Momčilo Ninčić resigned his office, which also prompted others in the government to followed his suit. Ninčić did that "on the ground that the check sustained by his policy impelled him to take such a step".

With this pact, in the eyes of King Alexander, Italy entered the Yugoslav zone of influence; Mussolini was not interested in diplomatic protests from Belgrade; Yugoslavia signed a secret military pact with France on 11 November 1927.

During this time the first contact between Ante Pavelić (who wanted Italian help for the destruction of Yugoslavia) and the creation of an independent Croatia with official representatives from Italy. After the proclamation of a dictatorship in Yugoslavia, Ante Pavelić left "his" country and went into exile in Italy in October 1929. Mussolini gave the job of approaching and helping Croatian separatists to Italian parliamentary member Fulvio Suvich in 1929.

After the proclamation of the 6 January Dictatorship, relations with the neighboring states remained "one of the chief concerns of the Belgrade Government". The Yugoslavian government was keenly interested in the renewal of the pact of friendship between Italy and Yugoslavia signed in Rome in 1924. Both the Foreign Minister Vojislav Marinković and the Acting Foreign Minister Kosta Kumanudi shared the same views on external affairs. The Prime Minister Petar Živković stated that the policy of his Government "would be peaceful and follow the same lines as those pursued heretofore by King Alexander's Government's." Nevertheless, the Yugoslav Government continued to monitor internal events in Albania, especially the crisis that forced Elias Vrioni, who had been regarded as "in very close touch with Mussolini", to leave the Tirana Government.

This poor relationship between the two kingdoms were best shown in the events of 1928 and 1929. The first diplomatic problems were born when Zog I of Albania, with Italian help, proclaimed himself King of the Albanians. The majority of the population in Yugoslavian Kosovo during this period were Albanians in Yugoslavian eyes; this proclamation became an invitation for the creation of Greater Albania with Italian help. These fears were confirmed in 1929 when Italy refused to sign a new friendship agreement with Yugoslavia. The following year she allowed Ante Pavelić to live in Italy where he organized the Ustaše (a Croatian fascist anti-Yugoslav movement).

Yugoslavia commenced secret negotiations with Italy in late 1930. To put more pressure on Belgrade, Mussolini made a few speeches with the words "Dalmazia o morte" (Dalmatia or death); but the real demand was that Yugoslavia accept Italian supremacy in Albania. When this offer was refused in 1932, Yugoslavia started to look for new allies against his demands. Consequently, Yugoslavia signed a trade agreement with Nazi Germany in March 1934.

=== Later years ===
The Julian March within the Kingdom of Italy (1923–1947), with its four provinces: the province of Gorizia (blue), the province of Trieste (green), the province of Fiume (red), the province of Pola (yellow)

The Yugoslav king Alexander was killed on 9 October 1934 by members of the Internal Macedonian Revolutionary Organization, helped by the Ustaše. Italy was criticised for helping and financing them, sending all members to closed training camps where they received Italian support and control. The Ustaše did not forget the unfriendly actions taken by the Italian "controller" Ercole Conti.

Upon pressure from France, the Kingdom of Yugoslavia did not raise the issue of Italian international responsibilities in the regicide before the League of Nations. After the coming to power of Milan Stojadinović, the relationship between the two kingdoms improved. A trade agreement was signed on 1 October 1936, followed by renewed negotiations which resulted in the signing of further agreements on 25 March 1937 stating the commencement of an officially friendly relationship. An agreement was also signed settling all border issues, while Italy provided information to Yugoslavia about the identities and place of residence for 510 Ustaše members. In 1939, Galeazzo Ciano directly negotiated with Milan Stojadinović the annexation of Albania by Italy. On that occasion, the Yugoslav regent Prince Pavle, fired and arrested Stojadinović; from then on, Italian-Yugoslav relations rapidly deteriorated.

In the last two years before the start of World War II, Italy almost broke off diplomatic contact with Yugoslavia and started negotiations with Germany and the Ustaše. Italy recalled General Gastone Gambara from Spain in 1940 so that he could take control of forces which would attack Banovina of Croatia (a Yugoslav province). This offensive was only delayed because of the Italian declaration of war against France on 10 June 1940. Italy created plans of attack on Yugoslavia in February 1940 with the primary objective of taking Šibenik, Split and Kotor so that the Adriatic situation would be eased. The only problem with this plan was that Adolf Hitler wanted to create an alliance between the two kingdoms against Greece. During negotiations in late 1940, Italy offered Thessaloniki to Yugoslavia but it was rejected. Only when Hitler put forward a similar offer in March 1941 was it accepted, and Yugoslavia become a member of the Axis powers on 25 March 1941. Hitler ordered an attack on Yugoslavia following the coup d'état on 27 March; two days later the new Yugoslav prime minister, Dušan Simović, asked for Italian help in restoring relations with Germany. Simović warned Italy that Yugoslavia would overrun Italian Albania if the Axis powers declared war. This war would start on 6 April 1941 and end with the destruction of the Yugoslav Kingdom on 17 April.

== Second World War (1940–45) ==
=== Italian-German invasion of Yugoslavia ===
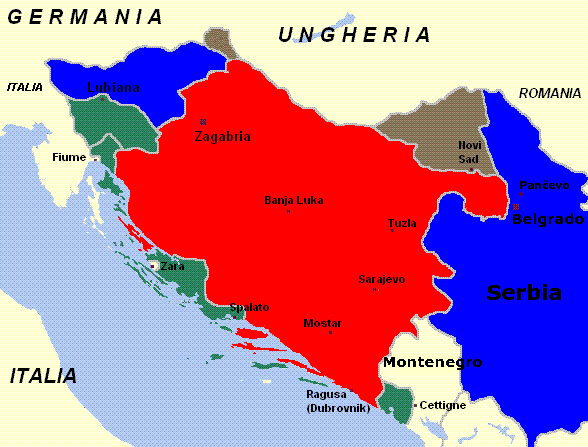
Division of Yugoslavia after its invasion by the Axis powers. Areas annexed by Italy: the area constituting the province of Ljubljana, the area merged with the province of Fiume and the areas making up the second Governorate of Dalmatia Independent State of Croatia Area occupied by Nazi Germany Areas occupied by Kingdom of Hungary

The Invasion of Yugoslavia (code-name Directive 25 or Operation 25) was the Axis powers' attack on the Kingdom of Yugoslavia which began on 6 April 1941 during World War II. The invasion ended with the unconditional surrender of the Royal Yugoslav Army on 17 April 1941, the annexation and occupation of the region by the Axis powers and the creation of the Independent State of Croatia (Nezavisna Država Hrvatska, or NDH). Italy annexed the area constituting the province of Ljubljana, the area merged with the province of Fiume and the areas making up the second Governorate of Dalmatia.

The Italian Second Army crossed the border soon after the Germans. They faced the Yugoslavian Seventh Army. The Italians encountered limited resistance and occupied parts of Slovenia, Croatia, and the coast of Dalmatia. In addition to the Second Army, Italy had four divisions of the Ninth Army on the Yugoslavian border with Albania. These formations were so situated against a Yugoslav offensive on that front. Around 300 Ustaše volunteers under the command of Ante Pavelic accompanied the Italian Second Army during the invasion; about the same number of Ustaše were attached to the German Army and other Axis allies.

The Independent State of Croatia was founded on 10 April 1941, after the invasion of Yugoslavia by the Axis powers. The state was technically a monarchy and Italian protectorate from the signing of the Rome agreements on 19 May 1941 until the Italian capitulation on 8 September 1943; but the king-designate, the Prince Aimone of Savoy-Aosta, refused to assume the kingship in opposition to the Italian annexation of the Croat-populated Yugoslav region of Dalmatia.

=== End of the war ===
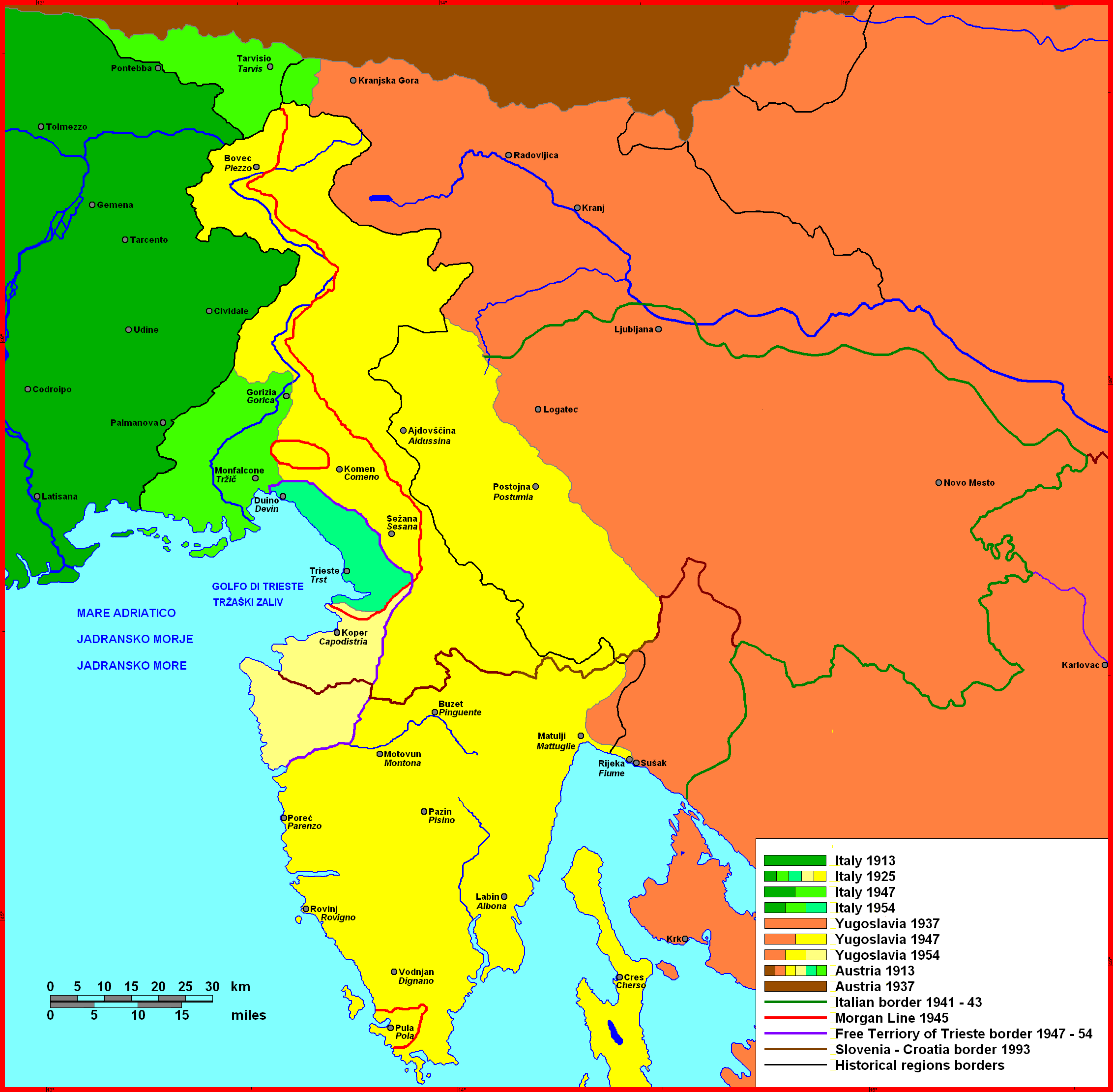
Changes to the Italy–Yugoslavia border from 1920 to 1975. Areas annexed to Italy in 1920 by the Treaty of Rapallo (with adjustments of its border in 1924 after the Treaty of Rome); ceded to Yugoslavia in 1947 by the Treaty of Paris Areas annexed to Italy in 1920 which remained Italian after 1947 Areas annexed to Italy in 1920 which passed to the Free Territory of Trieste in 1947 with the Paris treaties; definitively assigned to Italy in 1975 by the Treaty of Osimo Areas annexed to Italy in 1920 which passed to the Free Territory of Trieste in 1947 with the Paris treaties; definitively assigned to Yugoslavia in 1975 by the Osimo treaty

When the Fascist regime collapsed in 1943 and Italy capitulated, its eastern border territory was occupied by German forces, the authority of the Italian Social Republic in this zone being largely theoretical. The Yugoslav 4th Army, together with the Slovenian 9th Corps entered Trieste on 1 May 1945. The 2nd (New Zealand) Division of the British 8th Army arrived the next day and forced the surrender of 2,000 German Army soldiers holding out in Trieste which had refused to capitulate to partisan troops. An uneasy truce developed between Allied and Yugoslav troops occupying the area until British General Sir William Morgan proposed a partition of the territory and the removal of Yugoslav troops from the area occupied by the Allies. Josip Broz Tito agreed in principle on 23 May as the British XIII Corps was moving forward to the proposed demarcation line. An agreement was signed in Duino on 10 June, creating the Morgan Line. Yugoslav soldiers withdrew by 12 June 1945.

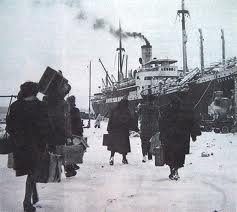
Istrian Italians leave Pola in 1947 during the Istrian-Dalmatian exodus.

The end of the war on the Italian-Yugoslav border, after the Italian capitulation on 8 September 1943, was marked by the foibe massacres (perpetrated by Yugoslav partisans) that took place mainly in Istria from 1946 to 1949, the Istrian–Dalmatian exodus, which involved the emigration of around 350,000 Istrian Italians and Dalmatian Italians, and the issue of Trieste.

The Istrian-Dalmatian exodus indicates the departure of ethnic Italians from Istria, Rijeka (Fiume) and Dalmatia after World War II. At the time of the exodus, these territories were part of the SR Croatia and SR Slovenia (then parts of SFR Yugoslavia). According to some sources, the exodus was incited by the Yugoslav government, while the Italian government offered incentives for immigration. These territories were ethnically mixed, with Italian, Slovenian, Croatian, Serbian and other communities. Istria, including Rijeka and parts of Dalmatia, including Zadar, had been annexed to Italy after World War I.

From 1947, after the war, Istrian Italians and Dalmatian Italians were subject by Yugoslav authorities to less violent forms of intimidation, such as nationalization, expropriation, and discriminatory taxation, which gave them little option other than emigration. The exodus started in 1943 and ended completely only in 1960. According to the census organized in Croatia in 2001 and that organized in Slovenia in 2002, the Italians who remained in the former Yugoslavia amounted to 21,894 people (2,258 in Slovenia and 19,636 in Croatia).

In 1991 Milovan Đilas was to say "I remember that in 1946 me and Edvard Kardelj went to Istria to organize the anti-Italian propaganda. It was all about proving to the Allied Commission that those lands were Yugoslav and not Italian: we organized manifestations with signs and flags.

But wasn't it true? (journalist's question)

Of course it wasn't. Better still, it was just partly true, because in reality Italians were the majority in the towns, not in the villages. It was therefore necessary to persuade them to leave with every kind of pressions. So it was told us and so it was done."

At the end of World War II the former Italian territories in Istria and Dalmatia became part of the Socialist Federal Republic of Yugoslavia by the Paris Peace Treaty (1947), the only exception being the communes of Muggia and San Dorligo della Valle.

The Free Territory of Trieste was established by demand of the United Nations Security Council through its Resolution 16 of January 1947, under Article 24 of the UN charter, calling for the creation of a free state in Trieste and the region surrounding it. A permanent statute codifying its provisions was to become recognized under international law upon the appointment of an international governor approved by the Quatripartite Powers. On 15 September 1947, the peace treaty between the United Nations and Italy was ratified, establishing the Free Territory of Trieste. The official languages were Slovene, Italian and Croatian. However, the territory did not receive its planned self-government and it was maintained under military occupation, respecting the division into two zones as decided by the Morgan Line: Zone A, which was 222.5 km^{2} and had 262,406 residents including Trieste, was administered by British and American forces, while Zone B, which was 515.5 km^{2} with 71,000 residents including north-western Istria, was administered by the Yugoslav People's Army.

Between October 1947 and March 1948 the Soviet Union rejected the candidacy of 12 nominations for governor, at which point the Tripartite Powers (the United States, the United Kingdom and France), issued a note to Moscow and Belgrade on 20 March 1948, recommending that the territory be returned to Italian sovereignty. No governor was ever appointed under the terms of the UN Resolution. The Territory thus never functioned as a real independent state. Even so, its formal status was generally respected and it issued its own postage stamps. The break between the Tito government and the USSR in mid-1948 resulted in the proposal to return the territory to Italy being suspended until 1954.

After World War II, Italian irredentism disappeared along with the defeated Fascists and the Monarchy of the House of Savoy. After the Treaty of Paris (1947) and the Treaty of Osimo (1975), all territorial claims were abandoned by the Italian Republic. The Italian irredentist movement thus vanished from Italian politics.

== Cold War (1945–89) ==
Map of the Free Territory of Trieste and its division after the Treaty of Osimo (1975)

The Socialist Federal Republic of Yugoslavia was one of only two European countries that were liberated by its own forces during World War II, with limited assistance and participation by the Allies. It received support from the Western democracies and the Soviet Union, and at the end of the war no foreign troops were stationed on its soil. Partly as a result, the country found itself halfway between the two camps at the onset of the Cold War.

In 1947–1948, the Soviet Union attempted to command obedience from Yugoslavia, primarily on issues of foreign policy, which resulted in the Tito–Stalin split and almost ignited an armed conflict. A period of very cool relations with the Soviet Union followed, during which the US and the UK considered persuading Yugoslavia into the newly formed NATO. This changed in 1953 with the Trieste crisis, a tense dispute between Yugoslavia and the Western Allies over the eventual Yugoslav-Italian border (see Free Territory of Trieste), and with Yugoslav-Soviet reconciliation in 1956. This ambivalent position at the start of the Cold War matured into the non-aligned foreign policy which Yugoslavia actively espoused until its dissolution.

The issue of the status of Trieste was finally settled with the Treaty of Osimo, signed on 10 November 1975 by the Socialist Federal Republic of Yugoslavia and the Italian Republic in Osimo, Italy, to definitely divide the Free Territory of Trieste between the two states. The treaty was written in French and became effective on 11 October 1977. It was based on the memorandum of understanding signed in London in 1954, which had handed over the civil administration of Zone A to Italy and Zone B to Yugoslavia. Zone A, including the city of Trieste, became the Italian Province of Trieste, but Yugoslavia was granted free access to its port.

== Dissolution of Yugoslavia ==
The period of the breakup of Yugoslavia coincided with a season of political scandals and turmoil in Italy (the Tangentopoli affair and Mani Pulite inquiry), which brought de-consolidation of the Italian party system and a temporary general weakness in Italian foreign policy.

In this short time frame, Italy mainly backed its allies' moves in the Yugoslav crisis, such as the February 1991 German initiative, US-inspired, of threatening economic isolation of Yugoslavia in the lack of multi-party elections. In 1992, following the US, the Vatican, and the EC, Italy recognized the independence of Slovenia and Croatia. Italy also recognized Bosnia and Herzegovina and Macedonia.

== Aftermath ==
- Croatia–Italy relations
- Italy–Montenegro relations
- Italy–Slovenia relations
- Italy–Serbia relations

== See also ==
- Foreign relations of Italy
- Foreign relations of Yugoslavia
- Yugoslavia–European Communities relations
- Mediterranean Games
- Death and state funeral of Josip Broz Tito
- Yugoslavia at the 1956 Winter Olympics
- Yugoslavia at the 1960 Summer Olympics
- Italy at the 1984 Winter Olympics
- Italy in the Eurovision Song Contest 1990
- Yugoslavia in the Eurovision Song Contest 1965
- Yugoslavia in the Eurovision Song Contest 1991
- Dalmatian Italians

== Works cited ==
- Anonymous (8 December 1926). "Serious Effect of The Italo-Albanian Pact". The Daily Telegraph. p. 9.
- Moore, Martin (19 January 1929). "Jugoslavia and Italy". The Daily Telegraph. p. 12.
