= Slovenia–Ukraine relations =

- Slovenia: Ukraine

Slovenia–Ukraine relations are bilateral relations between Ukraine and Slovenia.

Slovenia recognized Ukraine's independence on 11 December 1991, and diplomatic relations were established three months later, on 10 March 1992. In 2004, in Ljubljana, Ukraine opened the Embassy of Ukraine in Slovenia, and the Embassy of Slovenia in Ukraine was opened in April 2004 in Kyiv. Before that, its task was performed by the Embassy of the Republic of Slovenia in Budapest. Ukraine has a general consulate in Maribor.

Both countries are full members of Council of Europe. Slovenia, along with Montenegro, is a Sectoral Dialogue Partner of the Organization of the Black Sea Economic Cooperation.

== History ==
In 2014, Slovenia condemned the Russian annexation of Crimea in support of Ukraine, and after the 2022 Russian invasion of Ukraine, Slovenia was put in Russia's "unfriendly countries" list, along with all EU members. Slovenian-Ukrainian relations improved, with embassies open in their respective capitals.

During the 2023 Slovenia floods, Ukrainian president Volodymyr Zelenskyy pledged to send humanitarian aid and Ukraine's foreign ministry said that it would provide one helicopter to assist with search and rescue operations. Additionally Ukraine sent an expert team of 51 members of Ukraine's National Emergency Services who had among other things helped with efforts during flooding because of the destruction of the Kakhovka Dam, along with 5 excavators and 14 other vehicles to help clear debris and clean up the aftermath of the floods in the Upper Sinvaja Valley. Slovenia's prime minister Robert Golob thanked for the help and said that the team would now share their experience and knowledge with Slovenia.

== See also ==
- Foreign relations of Ukraine
- Foreign relations of Slovenia
- Ukraine-NATO relations
- Ukraine-EU relations
  - Accession of Ukraine to the EU
