= Russia–Slovenia relations =

- Russia: Slovenia

Diplomatic mission
- Russian embassy, Ljubljana: Slovenian embassy, Moscow

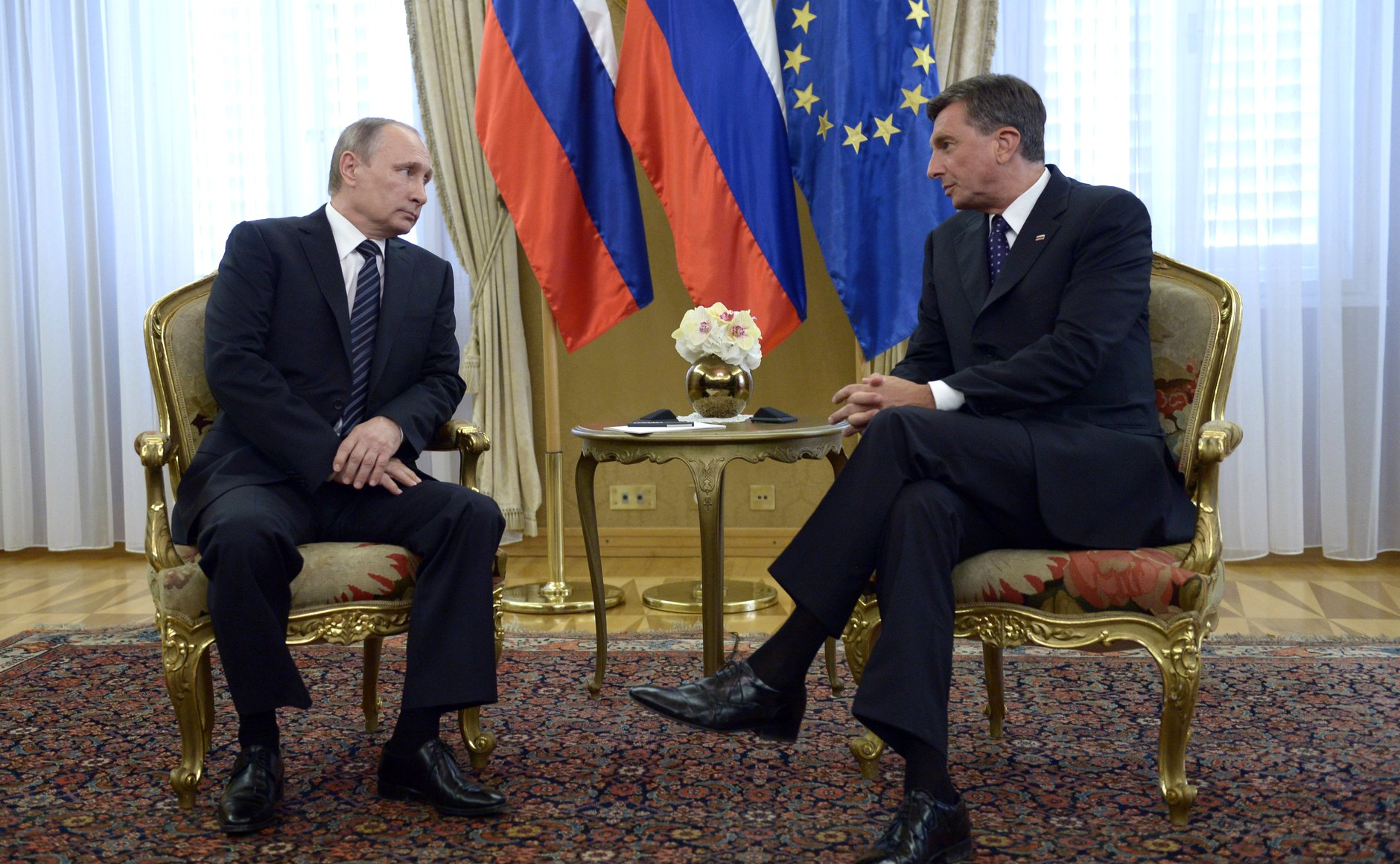
Borut Pahor with President of Russia Vladimir Putin in Ljubljana, Slovenia on 30 July 2016.

Russia and Slovenia established diplomatic relations on 25 May 1992. Russia has an embassy in Ljubljana while Slovenia has an embassy in Moscow and two honorary consulates (in Saint Petersburg and Samara). Until 2022, Russia had five honorary consuls in Slovenia, but Slovenia withdrew its consent to the appointments due to the Russian invasion of Ukraine.

== 2011–2021 ==
In March 2011, Russian Prime Minister Vladimir Putin visited Slovenia and met with Slovenian Prime Minister Borut Pahor and President Danilo Türk. The Russian and Slovenian delegations discussed economic, scientific and cultural partnership, especially regarding the construction of the South Stream pipeline.

After the Ukrainian Euromaidan began in 2013 and later prolonged into the Russo-Ukrainian War, Slovenia has sided with Ukraine over territorial integrity. Slovenia urged a political solution to handle the problem.

On 29 July 2021, Slovenian President Pahor and Russian President Putin declared Slovenia–Russia Friendship Day on 31 July 2021.

== Russian invasion of Ukraine ==
With the 2022 Russian invasion of Ukraine, together with other EU countries Slovenia has condemned the Russian aggression and has taken steps such as closing Slovenia's airspace to Russian flights and boycotting sports events held in Russia.

On the morning of 1 March 2022, a Russian missile 3M54-1 Kalibr struck Freedom Square in Kharkiv, Ukraine destroying the Slovene consulate in the city. In response, the Prime Minister of Slovenia Janez Janša said that the country will terminate all agreements with Russia relating to defence, security and political cooperation.

The Slovenian Ministry of Foreign Affairs also summoned the Russian ambassador and handed over a diplomatic note of protest requesting an apology and compensation for the damages.

After the Russian invasion of Ukraine started, Slovenia, as one of the EU countries, imposed sanctions on Russia, and Russia added all EU countries to the list of "unfriendly nations". In spite of this, the import from Russia and export to Russia significantly increased in the following months in annual terms (in July, that was 6 times, respectively, 56%), according to Russian state media RIA Novosti. Slovenia joined other countries in spring 2022 in declaring a number of Russian diplomats persona non grata.

On 24 October 2022, a photo of Slovenian nuclear waste was used to illustrate a propaganda communication by the Russian Defence Ministry regarding the alleged Ukrainian plans to construct a dirty bomb.

In December 2022 two foreign nationals were arrested, now believed to be Russian citizens working for Russia’s foreign intelligence service (SVR), under the false names of Maria Rosa Mayer Munos and Ludwig Gisch, they had used forged Argentinian passports to settle in Ljubljana with their children in 2017. A large amount of cash was seized. They are charged with espionage.

== Trade ==
In 2021, Russia exported $396 million worth of goods to Slovenia, with the main product being natural gas, whereas Slovenia exported $1.06 billion to Russia, with medication as the main category. Russian exports rose by an average of 2.35% between 1995 and 2021, and Slovenian exports rose by 4.92% during the same period.

Gallery

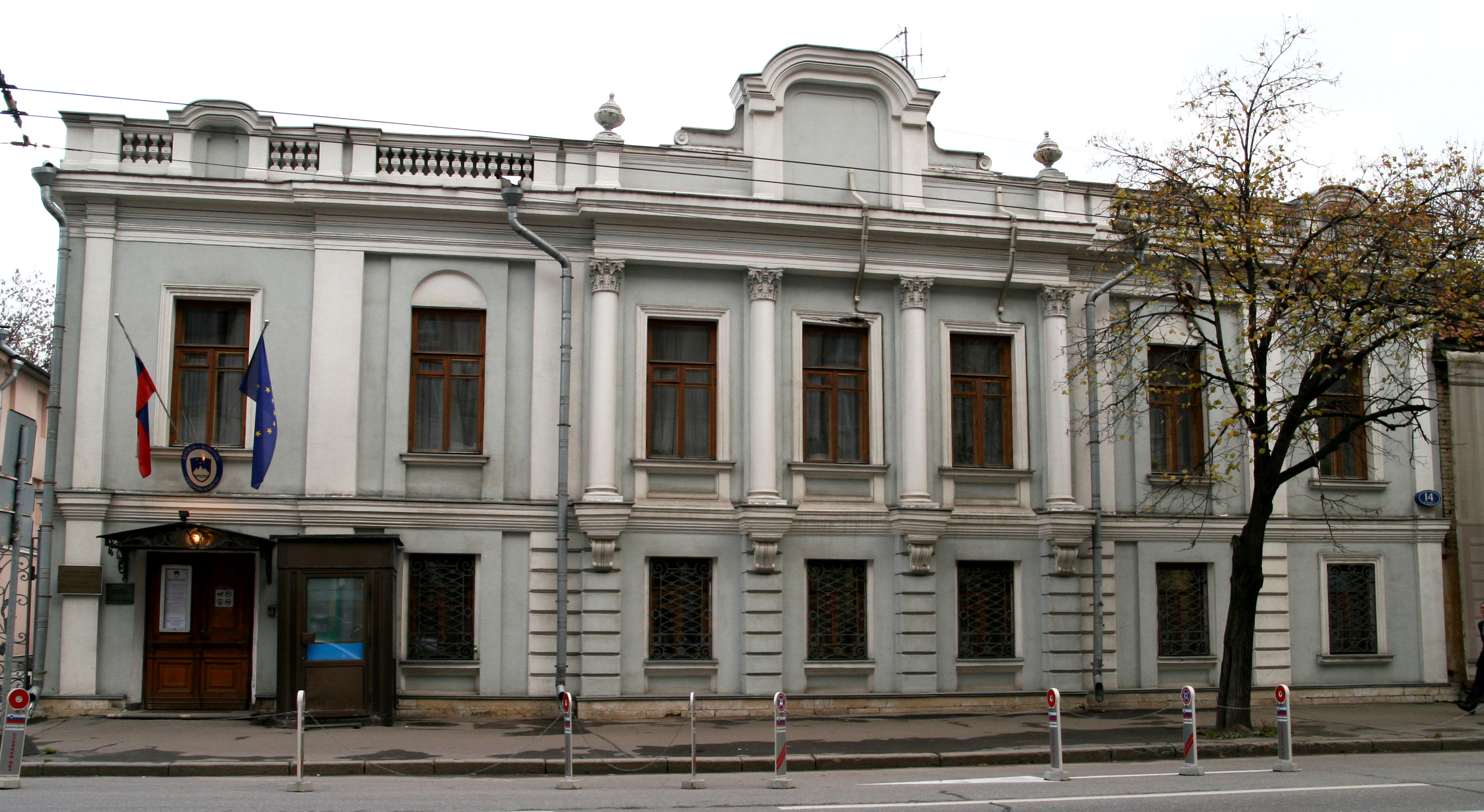
Embassy of Slovenia in Moscow

== See also ==
- Foreign relations of Russia
- Foreign relations of Slovenia
- List of ambassadors of Russia to Slovenia
