= Italy–Slovenia relations =

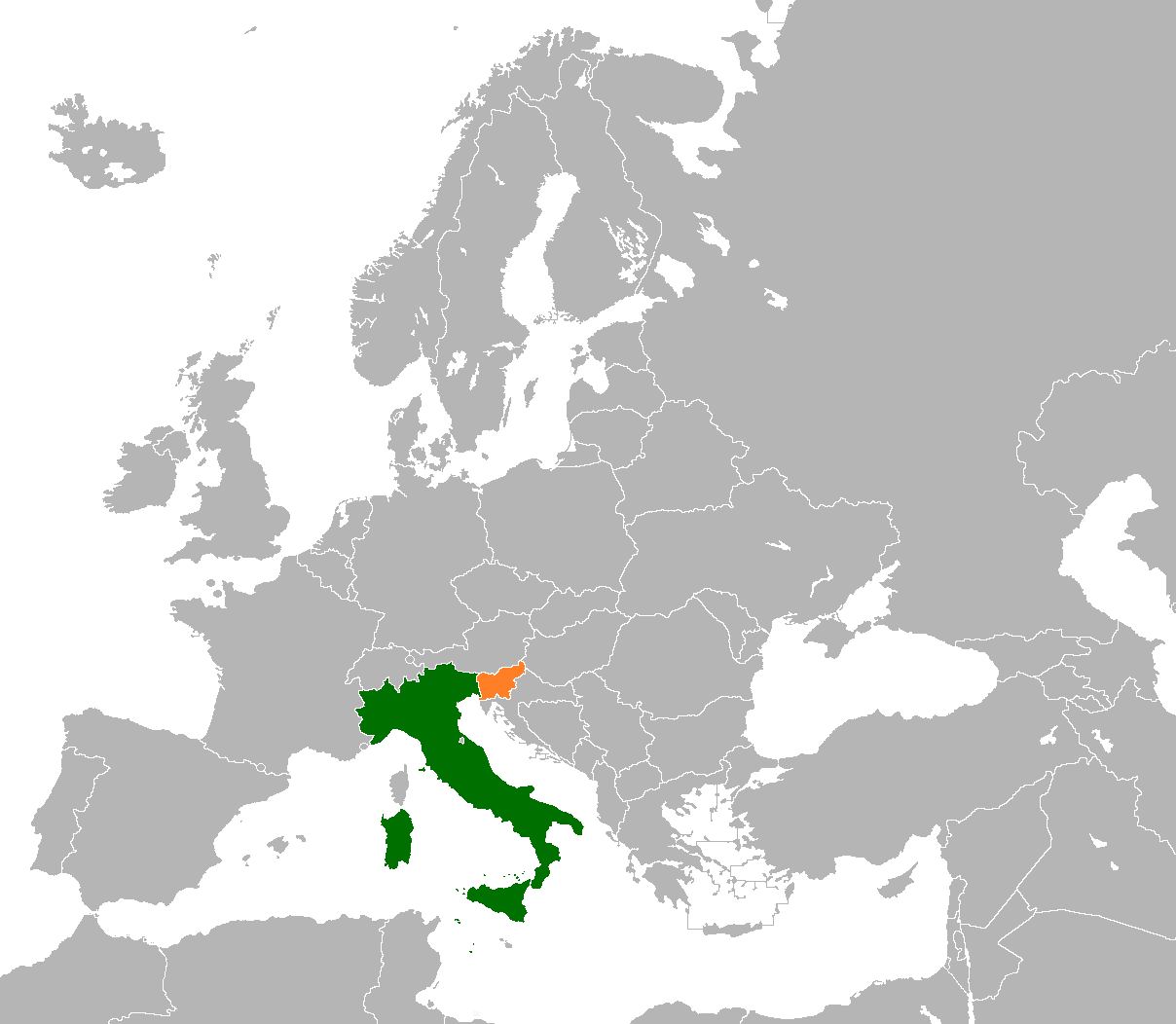

- Italy: Slovenia

Italy–Slovenia relations are foreign relations between the Italian Republic and the Republic of Slovenia.

The two countries share 199 km (124 mi)-long border, notably traversing the cross-border urban area of Gorizia and Nova Gorica. The border also includes a panhandle where the Italian city of Trieste is located on the Adriatic Sea, surrounded by Slovenia in three directions.

Italy and Slovenia established diplomatic relations in 1992. Italy has an embassy in Ljubljana and a consulate in Koper. Slovenia has an embassy in Rome and consulates in Trieste, Florence, and Milan. Both countries are full members of the European Union and NATO. In addition to the autochthonous minorities, the Istrian Italians in Slovenia and the Slovene Italians in Italy, there are around 3,200 people of Slovenian descent living in Italy as of 2010. Approximately 400,000 Italians visit Slovenia every year. Italy has given full support to Slovenia's membership in the European Union and NATO.

== the European Union and NATO ==
While Italy was one of the founding members of the EU, Slovenia joined the EU in 2004. While Italy was one of the founding members of NATO, Slovenia joined NATO in 2004.

== Resident diplomatic missions ==
- Italy has an embassy in Ljubljana and a consulate-general in Koper.
- Slovenia has an embassy in Rome and consulates-general in Milan and Trieste.

== See also ==
- Foreign relations of Italy
- Foreign relations of Slovenia
- Italians in Slovenia
- Slovene minority in Italy
- Italy–Yugoslavia relations
