= Egypt–Slovenia relations =

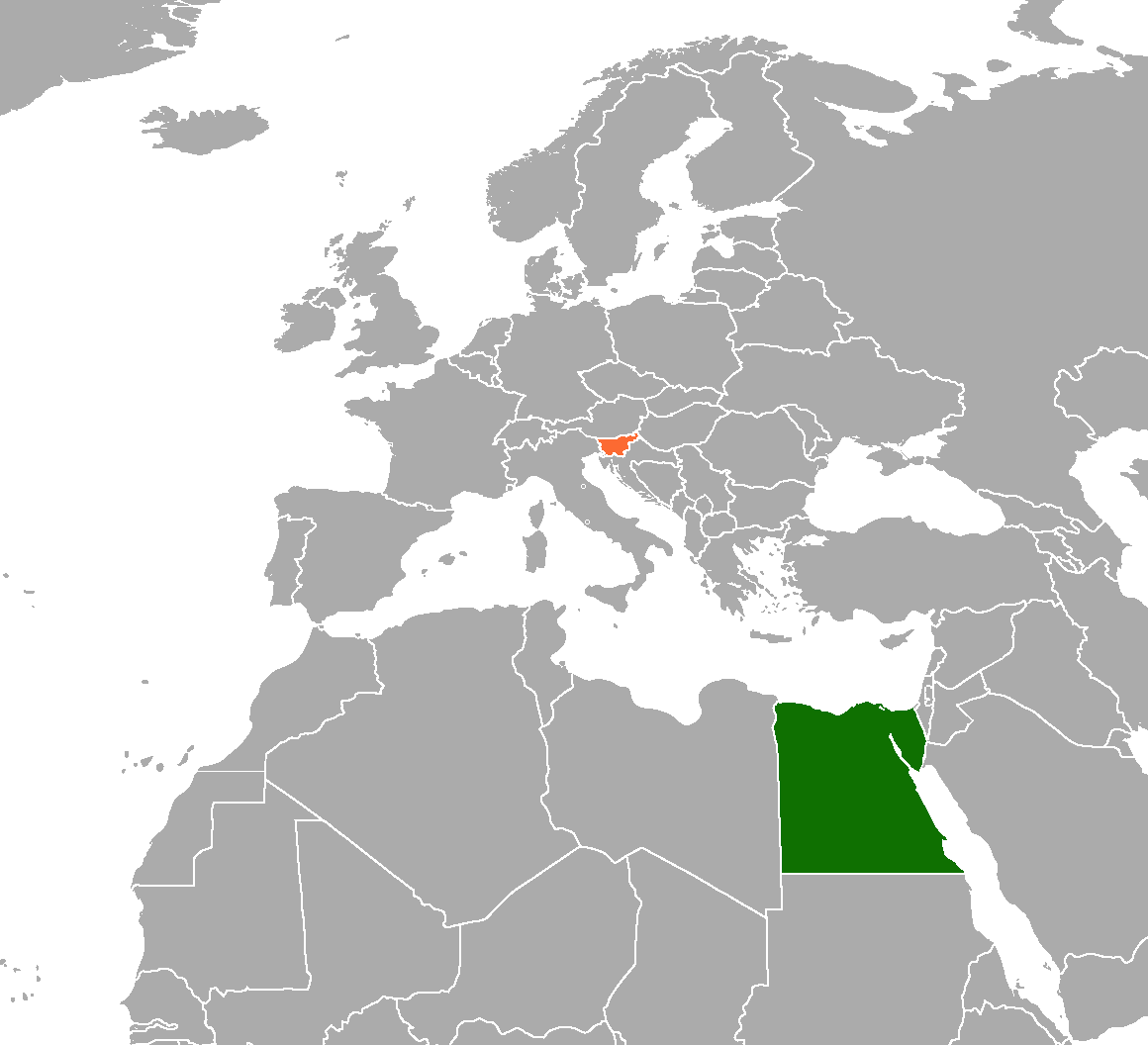

- Egypt: Slovenia

Egypt–Slovenia relations are the bilateral relations between Egypt and Slovenia. Since September 2007, Egypt has an embassy in Ljubljana. Slovenia has an embassy in Cairo (opened in 1993). Both countries are members of the Union for the Mediterranean.

In the late 19th and early 20th century, a significant number of Slovenian women known as Aleksandrinke were sent to Egypt to work as housemaids and nannies.

== High level visits ==
In June 1999, Slovene Prime Minister Janez Drnovšek met Egyptian Prime Minister Kamal Ganzouri in Cairo. They discussed means of boosting bilateral cooperation in the various domains especially the economic one.

In May 2007, Slovene Transport Minister Janez Bozic met his Egyptian counterpart Mohamed Mansour in Cairo. Their talks focused on boosting transport ties between the Egyptian port of Alexandria and the Slovenian port of Koper. Bozic said there was greater demand for the shipment of perishable goods, such as fruit and vegetables.

== Agreements ==
In 1997, the two countries signed a trade agreement.

== See also ==
- Foreign relations of Egypt
- Foreign relations of Slovenia
- Egypt–Yugoslavia relations
- Yugoslavia and the Non-Aligned Movement
- Yugoslavia and the Organisation of African Unity
