= Netherlands–Slovenia relations =

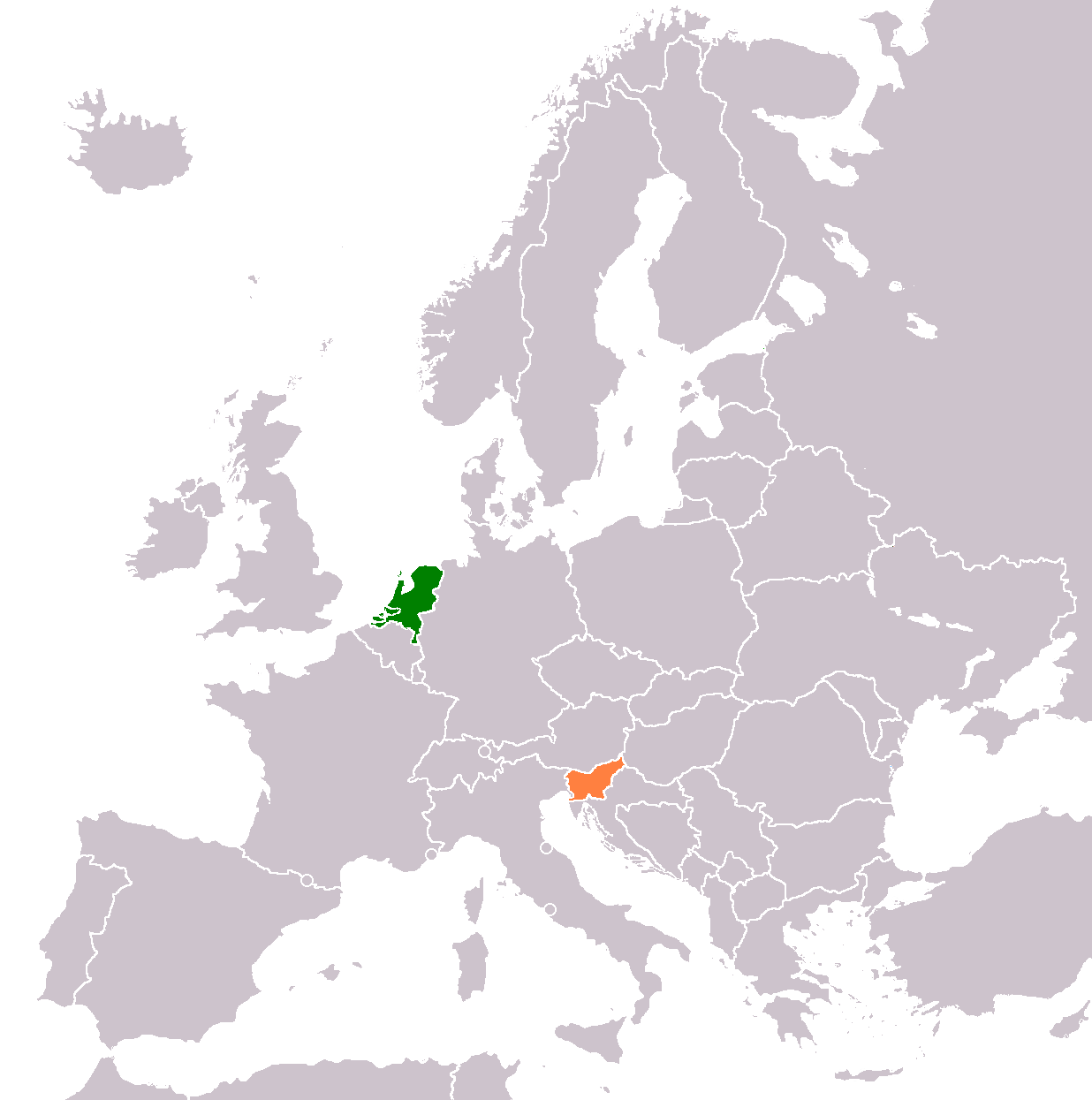

- Netherlands: Slovenia

Netherlands–Slovenia relations are foreign relations between the Netherlands and Slovenia. Both countries established diplomatic relations on June 25, 1991. The Netherlands has an embassy in Ljubljana. Slovenia has an embassy in The Hague. Both countries are full members of the Council of Europe, the European Union and NATO.

== International organizations ==
While the Netherlands is a founding member of the EU and NATO, Slovenia became a member of both the EU and NATO in 2004.

== Resident diplomatic missions ==
- the Netherlands has an embassy in Ljubljana.
- Slovenia has an embassy in The Hague.
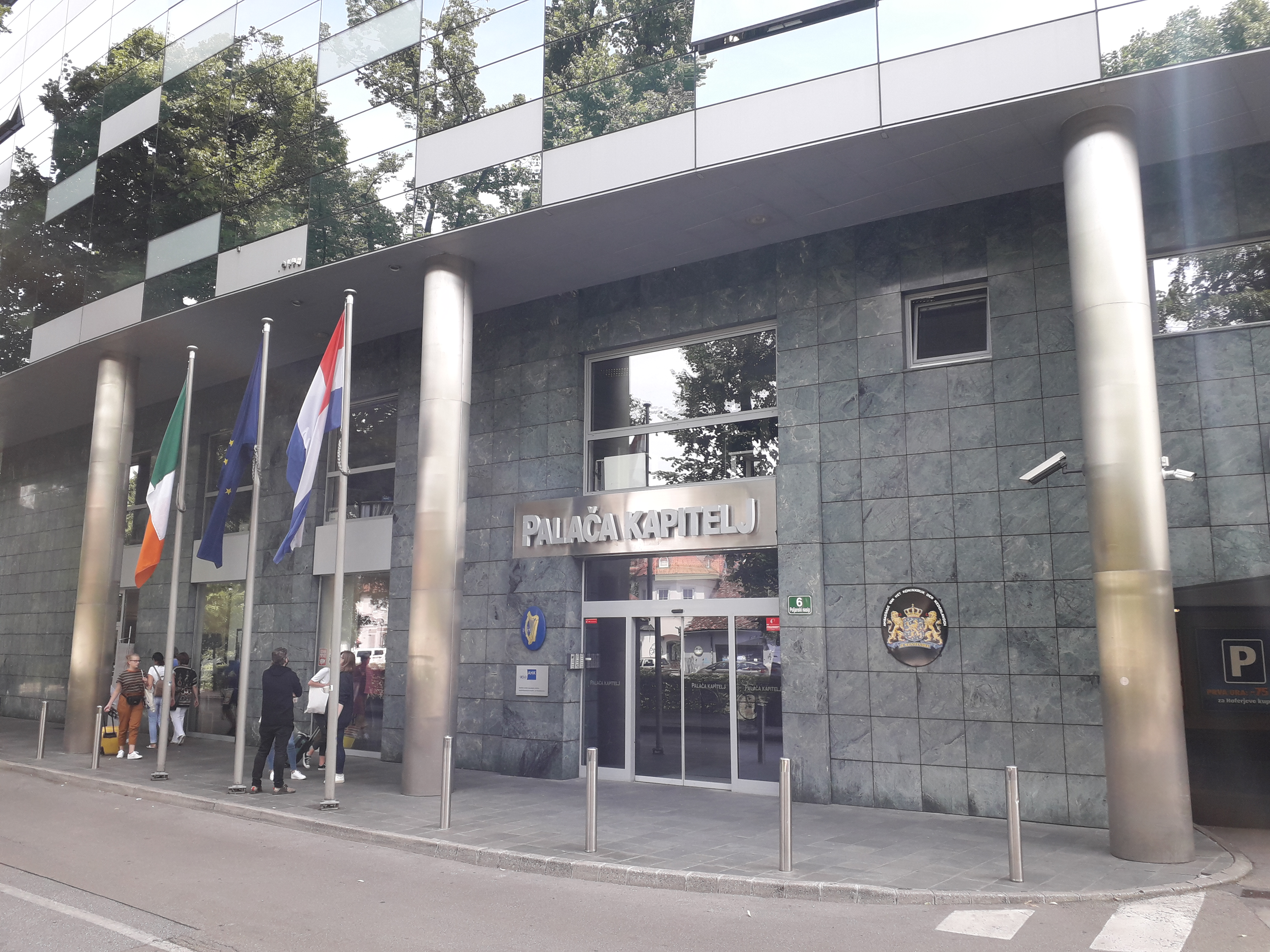
Embassy of the Netherlands in Ljubljana

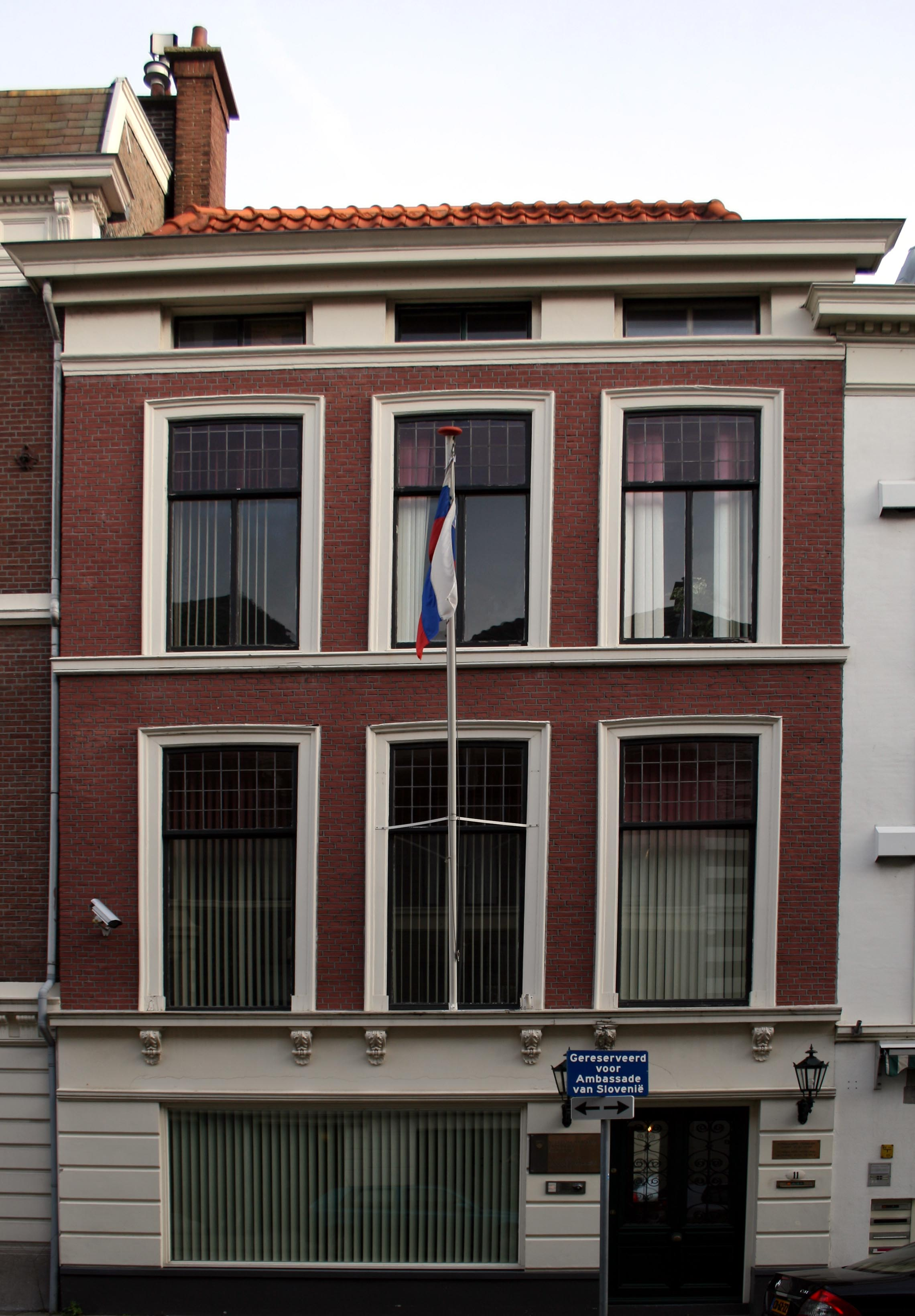
Embassy of Slovenia in The Hague

== See also ==
- Foreign relations of the Netherlands
- Foreign relations of Slovenia
