= Foreign relations of Slovenia =

Since Slovenia declared independence in 1991, its Governments have underscored their commitment to improving cooperation with neighbouring countries and actively contributing to international efforts aimed at bringing stability to Southeast Europe. Resource limitations have nevertheless been a problem hindering the efficiency of the Slovenian diplomacy. In the 1990s, foreign relations, especially with Italy, Austria and Croatia, triggered internal political controversies. In the last eight years, however, a wide consensus has been reached among the vast majority of Slovenian political parties to jointly work in the improvement of the country's diplomatic infrastructure and to avoid politicizing the foreign relations by turning them into an issue of internal political debates.

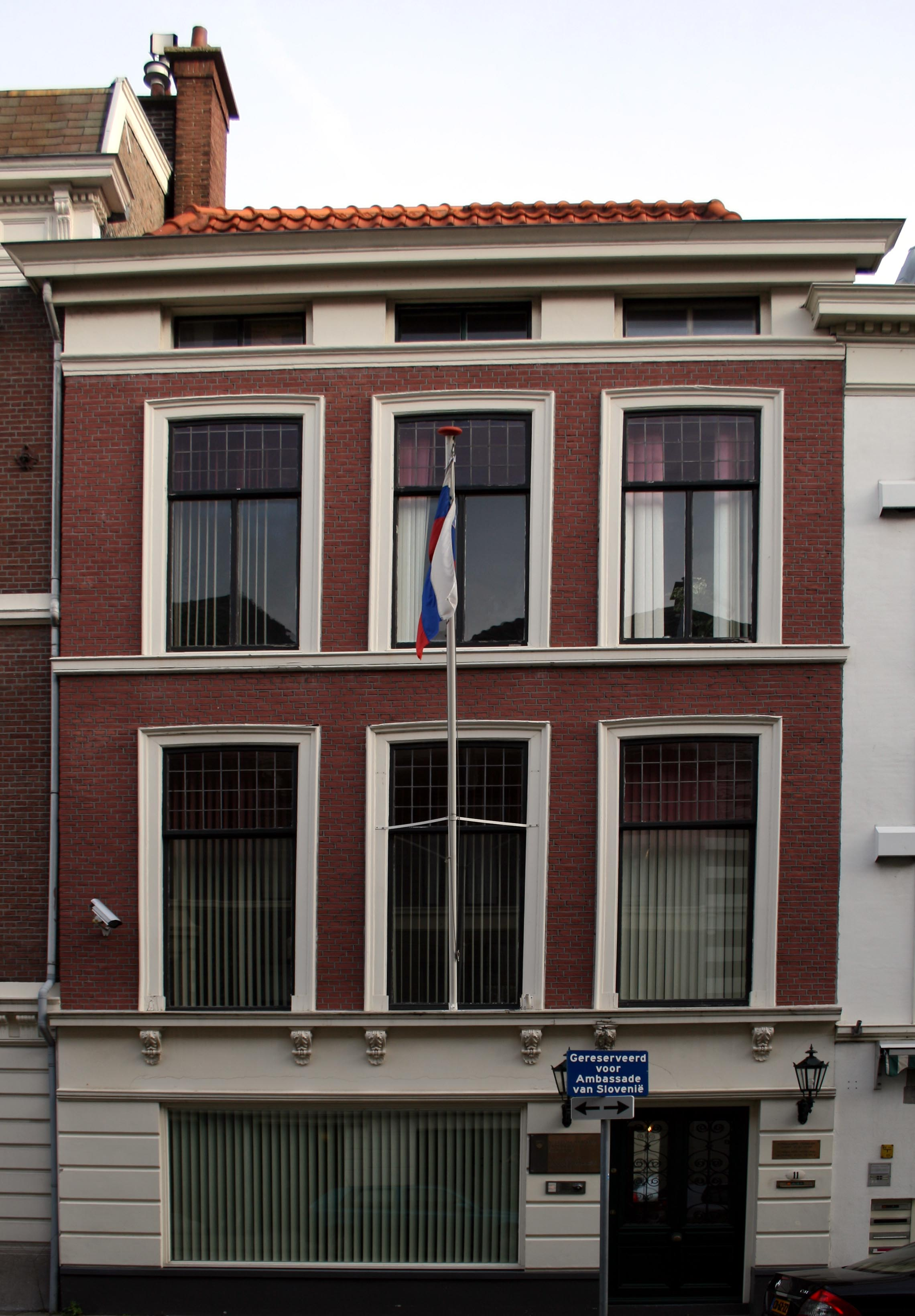
Slovenian embassy in the Hague.

== Relations with neighbors ==
Slovenia's bilateral relations with its neighbors are generally good and cooperative. However, a few unresolved disputes with Croatia remain. They are related mostly to the succession of the former Yugoslavia, including demarcation of their common border. In addition, unlike the other successor states of the former Yugoslavia, Slovenia did not normalize relations with the "Federal Republic of Yugoslavia" (Serbia and Montenegro) until after the passing from power of Slobodan Milošević; although the Slovenes did open a representative office in Podgorica to work with Montenegrin President Milo Đukanović's government.

Succession issues, particularly concerning liabilities and assets of the former Yugoslavia, remain a key factor in Slovenia's relations in the region. On the whole, no conflicts mar relations with neighbors, which are on a sound footing. Numerous cooperative projects are either underway or envisioned, and bilateral and multilateral partnerships are deepening. Differences, many of which stem from Yugoslavia's time, have been handled responsibly and are being resolved.

== Diplomatic relations ==
List of countries which Slovenia maintains diplomatic relations with:

#	Country	Date
1	Latvia	3 September 1991
2	Lithuania	22 November 1991
3	Estonia	11 December 1991
4	Austria	15 January 1992
5	Germany	15 January 1992
6	Hungary	16 January 1992
7	Italy	17 January 1992
8	United Kingdom	17 January 1992
9	Denmark	20 January 1992
10	Netherlands	24 January 1992
11	San Marino	28 January 1992
12	Sweden	29 January 1992
13	Switzerland	31 January 1992
14	Liechtenstein	31 January 1992
15	Portugal	3 February 1992
16	Australia	5 February 1992
17	Czech Republic	5 February 1992
18	Croatia	6 February 1992
—	Holy See	8 February 1992
19	Finland	17 February 1992
20	Norway	18 February 1992
21	Iceland	24 February 1992
22	Paraguay	25 February 1992
23	Belgium	5 March 1992
24	Iran	9 March 1992
25	Albania	10 March 1992
26	Ukraine	10 March 1992
27	Luxembourg	11 March 1992
28	North Macedonia	17 March 1992
29	Bolivia	18 March 1992
30	New Zealand	20 March 1992
31	Spain	25 March 1992
32	Poland	10 April 1992
33	Argentina	13 April 1992
34	Nicaragua	14 April 1992
35	Chile	15 April 1992
36	France	23 April 1992
37	Israel	28 April 1992
38	Egypt	30 April 1992
39	Malaysia	4 May 1992
40	Pakistan	11 May 1992
41	China	12 May 1992
42	India	18 May 1992
43	Russia	25 May 1992
44	Morocco	29 May 1992
45	Malta	29 June 1992
46	Mexico	10 July 1992
—	Sovereign Military Order of Malta	15 July 1992
47	Greece	21 July 1992
48	Belarus	23 July 1992
49	United States	11 August 1992
50	Cape Verde	17 August 1992
51	Bulgaria	18 August 1992
52	Turkey	26 August 1992
53	Romania	28 August 1992
54	Singapore	7 September 1992
55	North Korea	8 September 1992
56	Peru	9 September 1992
57	Thailand	9 September 1992
58	Cuba	22 September 1992
59	Algeria	12 October 1992
60	Indonesia	12 October 1992
61	Japan	12 October 1992
62	United Arab Emirates	15 October 1992
63	Marshall Islands	19 October 1992
64	Kazakhstan	20 October 1992
65	Seychelles	21 October 1992
66	South Africa	30 October 1992
67	Ethiopia	6 November 1992
68	Bosnia and Herzegovina	16 November 1992
69	South Korea	18 November 1992
70	Belize	19 November 1992
71	Mali	3 December 1992
72	Cyprus	10 December 1992
73	Qatar	15 December 1992
74	Nigeria	19 December 1992
75	Brazil	21 December 1992
76	Venezuela	28 December 1992
77	Slovakia	1 January 1993
78	Canada	7 January 1993
79	Georgia	18 January 1993
80	Philippines	3 February 1993
81	Ghana	15 February 1993
82	Mongolia	18 February 1993
83	Liberia	30 March 1993
84	Uruguay	26 April 1993
85	Tunisia	20 May 1993
86	Tanzania	4 June 1993
87	Antigua and Barbuda	15 June 1993
88	Dominica	9 July 1993
89	Lebanon	29 July 1993
90	Jordan	22 October 1993
91	Moldova	27 October 1993
92	Saint Vincent and the Grenadines	11 November 1993
93	Turkmenistan	11 November 1993
94	Guatemala	25 November 1993
95	Kyrgyzstan	19 January 1994
96	Sudan	25 January 1994
97	Namibia	24 March 1994
98	Ivory Coast	12 May 1994
99	Vietnam	7 June 1994
100	Armenia	12 July 1994
101	Colombia	19 July 1994
102	Kuwait	5 October 1994
103	Uzbekistan	16 January 1995
104	Zambia	15 February 1995
105	Burkina Faso	28 March 1995
106	Panama	10 May 1995
107	Saudi Arabia	7 June 1995
108	Andorra	13 July 1995
109	Yemen	12 October 1995
110	Costa Rica	19 October 1995
111	Tonga	7 December 1995
112	Oman	13 December 1995
113	Ireland	25 January 1996
114	Azerbaijan	20 February 1996
115	Bahrain	28 February 1996
116	Maldives	4 March 1996
117	Bangladesh	20 March 1996
118	Honduras	25 March 1996
119	Laos	28 March 1996
120	Eritrea	4 April 1996
121	Mauritania	4 June 1996
122	Cambodia	16 July 1996
123	Jamaica	23 July 1996
124	Sri Lanka	25 July 1996
125	Fiji	29 November 1996
126	Gabon	11 December 1996
127	Guinea	11 December 1996
128	Mozambique	19 December 1996
129	Ecuador	18 April 1997
130	Brunei	28 April 1997
131	Trinidad and Tobago	9 May 1997
132	Senegal	19 May 1997
133	Mauritius	30 May 1997
134	Guinea-Bissau	24 July 1997
135	Suriname	22 August 1997
136	Syria	25 August 1997
137	El Salvador	10 November 1997
138	Samoa	25 November 1997
139	Nepal	2 December 1997
140	Togo	31 July 1998
141	Cameroon	29 September 1998
142	Haiti	30 March 1999
143	Serbia	9 December 2000
144	Tajikistan	4 April 2002
145	Dominican Republic	11 March 2003
146	Timor-Leste	3 April 2003
147	Angola	20 January 2004
148	Bahamas	10 September 2004
149	Afghanistan	20 September 2004
150	Kenya	3 November 2004
151	Benin	1 December 2004
152	Iraq	29 April 2005
153	Botswana	20 July 2005
154	Gambia	25 August 2005
155	Saint Lucia	29 August 2005
156	Montenegro	21 June 2006
157	Niger	22 June 2006
158	Uganda	31 August 2006
159	Madagascar	5 October 2006
160	Monaco	28 November 2006
161	Rwanda	8 December 2006
162	Djibouti	14 December 2006
163	Myanmar	18 December 2006
164	Republic of the Congo	19 April 2007
165	Guyana	19 April 2007
166	Burundi	27 July 2007
167	Libya	19 September 2007
168	Barbados	18 December 2007
—	Kosovo	7 April 2008
169	Saint Kitts and Nevis	5 June 2009
170	Tuvalu	12 June 2009
171	Papua New Guinea	9 February 2010
172	Equatorial Guinea	26 May 2010
173	Solomon Islands	18 November 2010
174	Palau	18 February 2011
175	Democratic Republic of the Congo	25 February 2011
176	Nauru	11 March 2011
177	Federated States of Micronesia	24 March 2011
178	Comoros	25 April 2011
179	Grenada	4 May 2011
180	Sierra Leone	10 May 2011
181	Malawi	21 July 2011
182	South Sudan	23 September 2011
183	Bhutan	13 September 2012
184	Somalia	3 April 2014
185	São Tomé and Príncipe	10 April 2014
186	Vanuatu	17 June 2015
187	Zimbabwe	22 July 2016
188	Central African Republic	13 February 2017
189	Kiribati	8 June 2021
—	State of Palestine	5 June 2024
190	Chad	1 August 2025

== Bilateral relations ==
=== Multilateral ===
Organization	Formal Relations Began	Notes
European Union		See 2004 enlargement of the European Union Slovenia joined the European Union as a full member on 1 May 2004.
NATO		Slovenia joined NATO as a full member on 29 March 2004.

=== Africa ===
Country	Formal Relations Began	Notes
Algeria		See Algeria–Slovenia relations
Egypt		See Egypt–Slovenia relations Since September 2007, Egypt has an embassy in Ljubljana. Slovenia has an embassy in Cairo (opened in 1993). Both countries are members of the Union for the Mediterranean.
Guinea-Bissau		Guinea-Bissau is represented in Slovenia by an honorary consulate in Ljubljana.
Libya		See Libya–Slovenia relations
South Africa	30 October 1992	South Africa recognized the independence and sovereignty of Slovenia on 2 April 1992.; Slovenia has no official representation in South Africa.; South Africa is represented in Slovenia through its embassy in Vienna, Austria, and through an honorary consulate in Ljubljana.
Tunisia		See Slovenia–Tunisia relations

=== Americas ===
Country	Formal Relations Began	Notes
Argentina	14 April 1992	See Argentina–Slovenia relations: Argentina is represented in Slovenia through its embassy in Vienna.; Slovenia has an embassy in Buenos Aires, which is also accredited to Chile, Peru, Paraguay and Uruguay.
Brazil	21 December 1992	See Brazil–Slovenia relations: Brazil has an embassy in Ljubljana.; Slovenia has an embassy in Brasília, which is also accredited to Bolivia, Colombia, Ecuador and Venezuela.
Canada		See Canada–Slovenia relations: Canada is represented in Slovenia through its embassy in Budapest, Hungary.; Slovenia has an embassy in Ottawa.; Both countries are full members of NATO.
Colombia	July 2004	Colombia is represented in Slovenia through its embassy in Vienna (Austria).; Slovenia is represented in Colombia through its embassy in Brasília (Brazil).
Dominica		Dominica is represented in Slovenia through its embassy in London.
Guatemala	25 November 1993	Guatemala is represented in Slovenia through its embassy in Vienna, Austria.; Slovenia is represented in Paraguay through its permanent mission in New York, U.S.
Mexico	22 May 1992	See Mexico–Slovenia relations: Mexico is accredited to Slovenia from its embassy in Vienna, Austria.; Slovenia is accredited to Mexico from its embassy in Washington, D.C., United States.
Paraguay		Paraguay is represented in Slovenia through its embassy in Vienna, Austria and has an honorary consulate in Ljubljana.; Slovenia is represented in Paraguay through its embassy in Buenos Aires, Argentina.
United States	7 April 1992	See Slovenia–United States relations: Slovenia has an embassy in Washington, D.C. and a consulate-general in Cleveland.; United States has an embassy in Ljubljana.; The first Lady of the United States, Melania Trump (Melanija Knavs) comes from Slovenia.

=== Asia ===
Country	Formal Relations Began	Notes
Armenia	27 June 1994	Diplomatic relations between Slovenia and Armenia began on 27 June 1994.; Armenia is represented in Slovenia through its embassy in Prague, the Czech Republic.; Slovenia is accredited to Armenia from its embassy in Kyiv, Ukraine and maintains an honorary consulate in Yerevan.
Azerbaijan	20 February 1996	Diplomatic relations between Slovenia and Azerbaijan began on 20 February 1996.; Azerbaijan has an embassy in Ljubljana.; Slovenia has a consulate in Baku.
China	1992	See China–Slovenia relations: China has an embassy in Ljubljana.; Slovenia has an embassy in Beijing and a consulate in Shanghai.
Georgia	13 January 1993	See Georgia–Slovenia relations: Georgia has an embassy in Ljubljana.; Slovenia is represented in Georgia through its embassy in Kyiv, Ukraine.
India	11 May 1992	See India–Slovenia relations: India has an embassy in Ljubljana.; Slovenia has an embassy in New Delhi.
Iran		Iran has an embassy in Ljubljana.; Slovenia has an embassy in Tehran.
Israel	28 April 1992	See Israel-Slovenia relations: Israel is represented in Slovenia through its embassy in Vienna (Austria) and an honorary consulate in Slovenia.; Since 1 August 1994 Slovenia has an embassy in Tel Aviv. Slovenia has an honorary consulate in Haifa and in Tel Aviv.; See also History of the Jews in Slovenia; Slovenian Ministry of Foreign Affairs: directions of representations in both countries
Japan		See Japan–Slovenia relations: Japan has an embassy in Ljubljana.; Slovenia has an embassy in Tokyo.
North Korea	1992	
Philippines	3 February 1993	Slovenia has an embassy in Manila, its first in the ASEAN region.; The Philippines has a consulate in Ljubljana, but its supervising post (embassy) is its embassy in Vienna, Austria.; Deputy Prime Minister Tanja Fajon paid an official visit to the Philippines on 10–12 March 2025, the first by a foreign minister to the country.
South Korea	1992-04-15	See Slovenia–South Korea relations The establishment of diplomatic relations between Republika Slovenija and the Republic of Korea began on 15 April 1992.: Slovenia and South Korea have good relations.; Slovenian embassy in Seoul.; South Korea will open a Korean embassy in Ljubljana.; The Republic of Slovenia and South Korea will have a sign of the Working Holiday Program.
Turkey		See Slovenia–Turkey relations: Slovenia has an embassy in Ankara.; Turkey has an embassy in Ljubljana.; Both countries are full members of NATO.
Vietnam	7 June 1994	

=== Europe ===
Country	Formal Relations Began	Notes
Albania		See Albania–Slovenia relations: Albania has an embassy in Ljubljana.; Slovenia has an embassy in Tirana.; Both countries are full members of NATO.
Austria		See Austria–Slovenia relations Relations between Austria and Slovenia are close. Austria was, next to Germany and the Holy See, the most firm supporter of Slovenia's independence. It firmly endorsed Slovenia's path into the European Union. Economic cooperation between the two countries is very important and has been expanding since the early 1990s. Regional cooperation, especially with the states of Carinthia and Styria, is well developed: as a concrete manifestation of the excellent state of regional relations, Slovenia, Austria, and Italy entered a joint bid to organize the 2006 and 2010 Winter Olympic Games.: Austria has an embassy in Ljubljana.; Slovenia has an embassy in Vienna.; Both countries are full members of the European Union.
Belgium		See Belgium–Slovenia relations: Belgium is represented in Slovenia through its embassy in Vienna, Austria.; Slovenia has an embassy in Brussels.; Both countries are full members of the European Union and NATO.
Bosnia and Herzegovina		See Bosnia and Herzegovina–Slovenia relations: Bosnia and Herzegovina has an embassy in Ljubljana.; Slovenia has an embassy in Sarajevo.; Bosnia and Herzegovina is an EU candidate and Slovenia is an EU member.
Bulgaria		See Bulgaria–Slovenia relations: Bulgaria has an embassy in Ljubljana.; Slovenia is represented in Bulgaria through its embassy in Budapest (Hungary).; Both countries are full members of the European Union and NATO.
Croatia		See Croatia–Slovenia relations Before 1991, both countries were part of Yugoslavia. On 26 June 1991 a mutual recognitial agreement was signed by both countries. Diplomatic relations between both countries were established on 6 February 1992. Croatia has an embassy in Ljubljana and two honorary consulates in Maribor and Koper. Slovenia has an embassy in Zagreb and an honorary consulate in Split. Both countries shares 670 km of common border.: Both countries are full members of the European Union and NATO.
Cyprus		See Cyprus–Slovenia relations: Cyprus is represented in Slovenia through its embassy in Vienna (Austria).; Slovenia is represented in Cyprus through its embassy in Athens (Greece).; Both countries are full members of the European Union.
Czech Republic		See Czech Republic–Slovenia relations: The Czech Republic has an embassy in Ljubljana.; Slovenia has an embassy in Prague.; Both countries are full members of the European Union and NATO.
Denmark		See Denmark–Slovenia relations: Denmark has an embassy in Ljubljana.; Slovenia has an embassy in Copenhagen.; Both countries are full members of the European Union and NATO.
Finland		See Finland–Slovenia relations: Finland is represented in Slovenia through its embassy in Budapest, Hungary.; Slovenia is represented in Finland through its embassy in Copenhagen, Denmark.; Both countries are full members of the European Union and NATO.
France		See France–Slovenia relations: France has an embassy in Ljubljana.; Slovenia has an embassy in Paris.; Both countries are full members of the European Union and NATO.
Germany		See Germany–Slovenia relations: Germany has an embassy in Ljubljana.; Slovenia has an embassy in Berlin.; Both countries are full members of the European Union and NATO.
Greece		See Greece–Slovenia relations: Greece has an embassy in Ljubljana.; Slovenia has an embassy in Athens.; Both countries are full members of the European Union and NATO.
Hungary		See Hungary–Slovenia relations Relations with Hungary are excellent. Unlike with some of Hungary's other neighbors, minority issues have not been a problem in Hungarian-Slovene relations. The Hungarian minority in Slovenia is granted a policy of positive discrimination under the Slovene constitution, and the legal status of Hungarian Slovenes is good. Within the Multilateral Cooperation Initiative between Slovenia, Italy, Hungary, and Croatia, cooperation exists in numerous fields, including military (Multinational Land Force peacekeeping brigade), transportation, combating money laundering and organized crime, non-proliferation, border crossings, and environmental issues.: Hungary has an embassy in Ljubljana.; Slovenia has an embassy in Budapest.; Both countries are full members of the European Union and NATO.
Ireland	1991	Ireland has an embassy in Ljubljana.; Slovenia has an embassy in Dublin.; Both countries are full members of the European Union.
Italy		See Italy–Slovenia relations The bilateral relations between Italy and Slovenia have improved dramatically since 1994 and are now at a very good level. In the early 1990s, the issue regarding property restitution to the Istrian exiles was hindering the development of a good relationship between the two countries. By 1996, however, the issue had been set aside, with Italy renouncing any revision of the Treaty of Osimo, allowing a significant improvement in relations. Italy was a firm supporter of Slovene EU and NATO membership, helping Slovenia technically and legislatively master its bid for membership in European and transatlantic institutions. In 2001, the Italian Parliament finally approved the legislation resolving the last open issues regarding the Slovenian minority in Italy. The legislation, welcomed by both the representatives of the Slovenian minority in Friuli-Venezia Giulia and the Slovenian government, started to be implemented in 2007, removing the last pending issue between the two countries. Since then, Italo-Slovene relations can be characterized as excellent. Although there do not appear to be any scheduled flights between the two countries and the train service, which used to be frequent, has been limited to one train a day in each direction (a night service from Budapest to Venice and back) until December 2011, when it was discontinued, thus leaving no railway connection between the two countries.: Italy has an embassy in Ljubljana and a consulate-general in Koper.; Slovenia has an embassy in Rome and consulates-general in Milan and Trieste.; Both countries are full members of the European Union and NATO.
Kosovo		See Kosovo–Slovenia relations Slovenia has a record of supporting the U.S. position on Kosovo, both in regular public statements by top officials and on the Security Council. Prior and during the Kosovo War of 1999, Slovenian top government officials called repeatedly for Slobodan Milošević's compliance with NATO demands. Slovenia granted NATO use of its airspace and offered further logistical support. It also has pledged personnel to support NATO humanitarian operations in the region. Slovenia helped Macedonia deal with the refugee crisis by providing 880 million sit (US$4.9 million) of humanitarian aid, in addition to granting a concession for imported agricultural products. The Slovene Government allocated 45 million SIT (US$250,000) to help Albania, Montenegro, and the Republic of Macedonia, one-third of which went to the latter. Slovenia took in over 4,100 Kosovar refugees during the crisis. Slovenia recognized Kosovo on 5 March 2008. Slovenia has an embassy in Pristina since 15 May 2008. Kosovo has an embassy in Ljubljana.
Latvia		See Latvia–Slovenia relations
Moldova		See Moldova–Slovenia relations Moldova recognized the Republic of Slovenia at an unknown date. Diplomatic relations were established on 27 October 1993. Both countries are represented in each other through their embassies in Budapest (Hungary).
Montenegro	21 June 2006	See Montenegro–Slovenia relations: Slovenia recognized Montenegro's independence on 20 June 2006.; Montenegro has an embassy in Ljubljana.; On 23 June 2006 Slovenia opened its embassy in Podgorica.; Both countries are full members of NATO.; Montenegro is an EU candidate and Slovenia is an EU member.
Netherlands	25 June 1991	See Netherlands–Slovenia relations: The Netherlands has an embassy in Ljubljana.; Slovenia has an embassy in The Hague.; Both countries are full members of the European Union and NATO.; Dutch Ministry of Foreign Affairs about relations with Slovenia (in Dutch only)
North Macedonia		See North Macedonia–Slovenia relations The two countries have very close political and economic relations. Once part of SFR Yugoslavia, the two republics declared independence in 1991 (Slovenia in June, Macedonia in September) and recognised each other's independence on 12 February 1992. Diplomatic relations between both countries were established on 17 March 1992. Slovenia supports North Macedonia's sovereignty, territorial integrity, its Euro-integration and visa liberalisation. A significant number of Slovenian investments ended up in North Macedonia. In 2007, about 70 million euros were invested. In January 2009, the Macedonian prime minister Nikola Gruevski announced, that he expects more Slovenian investments in infrastructure and energy projects. Over 70 Slovenian companies are present on the Macedonian market.: Both countries are full members of NATO.; North Macedonia is an EU candidate and Slovenia is an EU member.
Poland	10 April 1992	Poland has an embassy in Ljubljana.; Slovenia has an embassy in Warsaw.; Both countries are full members of the European Union and NATO.
Portugal		See Portugal–Slovenia relations: Portugal is represented in Slovenia through its embassy in Vienna, Austria.; Slovenia does not have an embassy accredited to Portugal.; Both countries are full members of the European Union and NATO.
Romania	28 August 1992	See Romania–Slovenia relations: Romania has an embassy in Ljubljana.; Slovenia has an embassy in Bucharest.; Both countries are full members of the European Union and NATO.
Russia	25 May 1992	See Russia–Slovenia relations: Russia has an embassy in Ljubljana.; Slovenia has an embassy in Moscow and two honorary consulates (in Saint Petersburg and Samara).
Serbia	9 December 2000	See Serbia–Slovenia relations: Serbia has an embassy in Ljubljana.; Slovenia has an embassy in Belgrade.; Serbia has an EU candidate status; Slovenia is an EU member.; Serbian Ministry of Foreign Affairs about the relation with Slovenia.
Slovakia		See Slovakia–Slovenia relations
Spain		See Slovenia–Spain relations: Slovenia has an embassy in Madrid.; Spain has an embassy in Ljubljana.; Both countries are full members of the European Union and of the NATO.
Sweden		See Slovenia–Sweden relations: Slovenia is represented in Sweden through its embassy in Copenhagen, Denmark.; Sweden is represented in Slovenia through its embassy in Budapest, Hungary.; Both countries are full members of the European Union and NATO.
Switzerland	1992	Slovenia has an embassy in Berne.; Switzerland has an embassy in Ljubljana; Swiss Federal Department of Foreign Affairs about relations with Slovenia
Ukraine	10 March 1992	See Slovenia–Ukraine relations: Slovenia has an embassy in Kyiv and two honorary consulate in Kharkiv and Lviv.; Ukraine has an embassy in Ljubljana.; Both countries are full members of the Organization for Security and Co-operation in Europe and of the Council of Europe.; Slovenian Ministry of Foreign Affairs: list of Slovenian representations in Ukraine
United Kingdom	15 January 1992	See Slovenia–United Kingdom relations Slovenia established diplomatic relations with the United Kingdom on 15 January 1992.: Slovenia maintains an embassy in London.; The United Kingdom is accredited to Slovenia through its embassy in Ljubljana.; Both countries share common membership of the Council of Europe, European Court of Human Rights, the International Criminal Court, NATO, OECD, OSCE, and the World Trade Organization. Bilaterally the two countries have a Double Taxation Convention, and an Investment Agreement.

== See also ==
- List of diplomatic missions in Slovenia
- List of diplomatic missions of Slovenia
- List of ambassadors to Slovenia
- Foreign relations of Yugoslavia
