= Brazil–Slovenia relations =

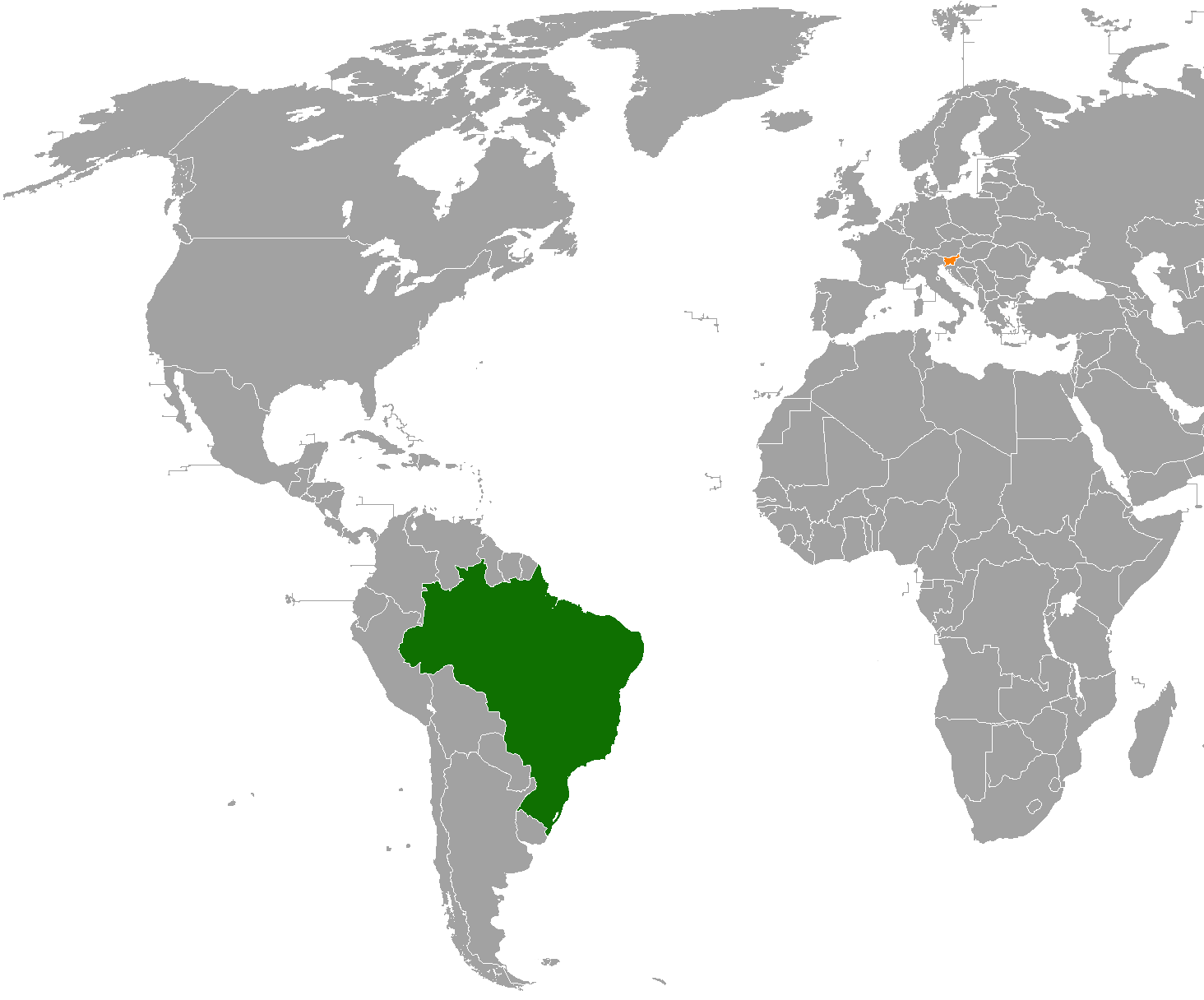

- Brazil: Slovenia

Brazil–Slovenia relations refers to the bilateral relations between Brazil and Slovenia. Both nations are members of the United Nations. The presence of Slovene immigrants in Brazil is relatively small but significant.

== History ==
Brazil officially recognized Slovenia on 24 January 1992, making it one of the first countries outside Europe to recognise the independence of the Republic of Slovenia. Bilateral relations were established on 21 December of the same year. Brazil appointed its first non-resident ambassador based in Vienna, Austria to Slovenia in 1994.

In 2008, Danilo Turk made an official visit to Brazil in the context of the preparation for the EU-Latin America Summit, making him the first Slovene President to make an official visit to Brazil. In the same year, Brazil opens an embassy in Ljubljana. In 2009, the Federal University of Rio de Janeiro and the National Institute of Biology of the Republic of Slovenia signed a General Agreement for the exchange of faculty, students and technical-administrative staff and teaching, research and extension activities.

Slovenia opened its embassy in Brasília in 2010.

== Resident diplomatic missions ==
- Brazil has an embassy in Ljubljana.
- Slovenia has an embassy in Brasília.

== See also ==
- Andreas Kisser, Brazilian musician of Slovene descent.
- Foreign relations of Brazil
- Foreign relations of Slovenia
- Brazil–Yugoslavia relations
