= Serbia–Slovenia relations =

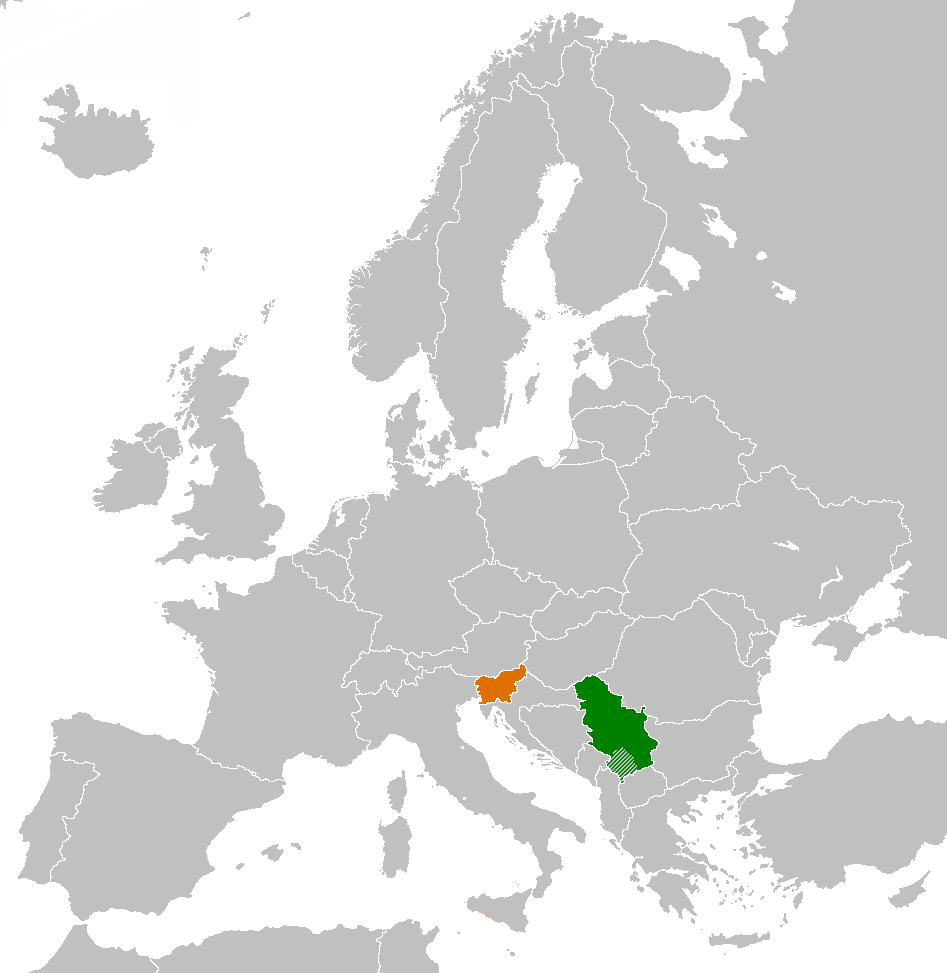

- Serbia: Slovenia

Serbia and Slovenia maintain diplomatic relations established between Slovenia and the Federal Republic of Yugoslavia (of which Serbia is considered sole legal successor) in 2000.

== History ==
Serbia and Slovenia have a long history of relations, with their titular nations sharing South Slavic cultural and linguistic heritage. Between 1918 and 1991, both countries were part of Yugoslavia. Slovenia gained its independence after the Ten-Day War. Since the reestablishment of relations, Slovenia has consistently been among the strong advocates of Accession of Serbia to the European Union. During the 2008 Slovenian Presidency of the Council of the European Union the country strongly supported the resumption of EU-Serbia negotiations, recognizing Serbia's critical role in ensuring regional stability. In 2024, during his visit to Ljubljana, Serbian Foreign Minister Marko Đurić expressed Serbia's support for the possibility of a Slovenian official taking the EU enlargement commissioner role, citing Slovenia's deep understanding of the region and its consistent support for Serbia's EU path. In December of that year Marta Kos was elected to serve as the European Commissioner for Neighbourhood and Enlargement.

A 2001 survey conducted by Slovenia's daily newspaper Delo revealed that a significant portion of Slovenians were still fluent in Serbo-Croatian, a language closely related to Slovenian, despite a decline in official and public usage after 1991. In response to the question about active language knowledge, 38% of Slovenians reported fluency in Croatian or Serbian, making it the most commonly spoken foreign language.

== Economic relations ==
Trade between two countries amounted to $1.77 billion in 2023; Serbia's merchandise export to Slovenia were about $777 million; Slovene exports were standing at $1 billion.

Slovene companies presence is especially felt in financial sector in Serbia: there is NLB Bank and an insurance company Triglav osiguranje. Other companies present in Serbia include Impol (aluminium plant in Užice), Jub (paints manufacturing plant in Pećinci), Cimos (automotive parts plant in Kikinda). Petrol has the retail network of 15 filling stations in Serbia.

== Immigration from Serbia ==
Serbs in Slovenia are mainly first or second generation immigrants from Serbia as well as from Bosnia and Herzegovina. According to data from the 2002 census, 38,964 people of Slovenia declared Serb ethnicity, corresponding to 2% of the total population, making them the second largest ethnic group in the country.

== Resident diplomatic missions ==
- Serbia has an embassy in Ljubljana.
- Slovenia has an embassy in Belgrade.

== See also ==
- Foreign relations of Serbia
- Foreign relations of Slovenia
- Agreement on Succession Issues of the Former Socialist Federal Republic of Yugoslavia
