= Brazil–Yugoslavia relations =

- Brazil: Yugoslavia

Brazil and Yugoslavia

Brazil–Yugoslavia relations were historical foreign relations between Brazil and now split-up Yugoslavia (Kingdom or Socialist Federal Republic of Yugoslavia). Following the breakup of Yugoslavia and ratification of the Agreement on Succession Issues Slovenia, one of five sovereign equal successor states, has taken over properties of the Embassy of Yugoslavia in Brasília.

== History ==
Brazil opened its Consulate in Belgrade in 1918 while the formal bilateral relations were established in 1938. Consulate General of the Kingdom of Yugoslavia in São Paulo was opened on 31 May 1929. The first Brazilian Ambassador to the Kingdom of Yugoslavia arrived on 3 June 1939. During World War II Brazil sent a chargé d’affaires to London, specifically to liaise with the Yugoslav Government in exile. After the end of World War II in Yugoslavia and the establishment of the Socialist Federal Republic of Yugoslavia diplomatic relations between the two countries were re-established in 1946 while in 1952 the rank of the representations was raised to the embassy level. Vice President of Brazil João Café Filho visited Yugoslavia in 1951. In 1963 President of Yugoslavia Josip Broz Tito organized a month long (18 September-17 October) South American tour during which he visited Brazil, Chile, Bolivia, Peru and Mexico.

== See also ==
- Yugoslavia and the Non-Aligned Movement
- Death and state funeral of Josip Broz Tito
- Brazil–Croatia relations
- Brazil–Serbia relations
- Brazil–Slovenia relations

== Sources ==
- Teodosić, Dragan (2019). БЕОГРАД – БРАЗИЛИЈА 80 година дипломатских односа/BELGRADE – BRASÍLIA 80 years of diplomatic relations (in Serbian and English). Belgrade: Archives of Yugoslavia. ISBN 978-86-80099-77-4.
