= Italy–Serbia relations =

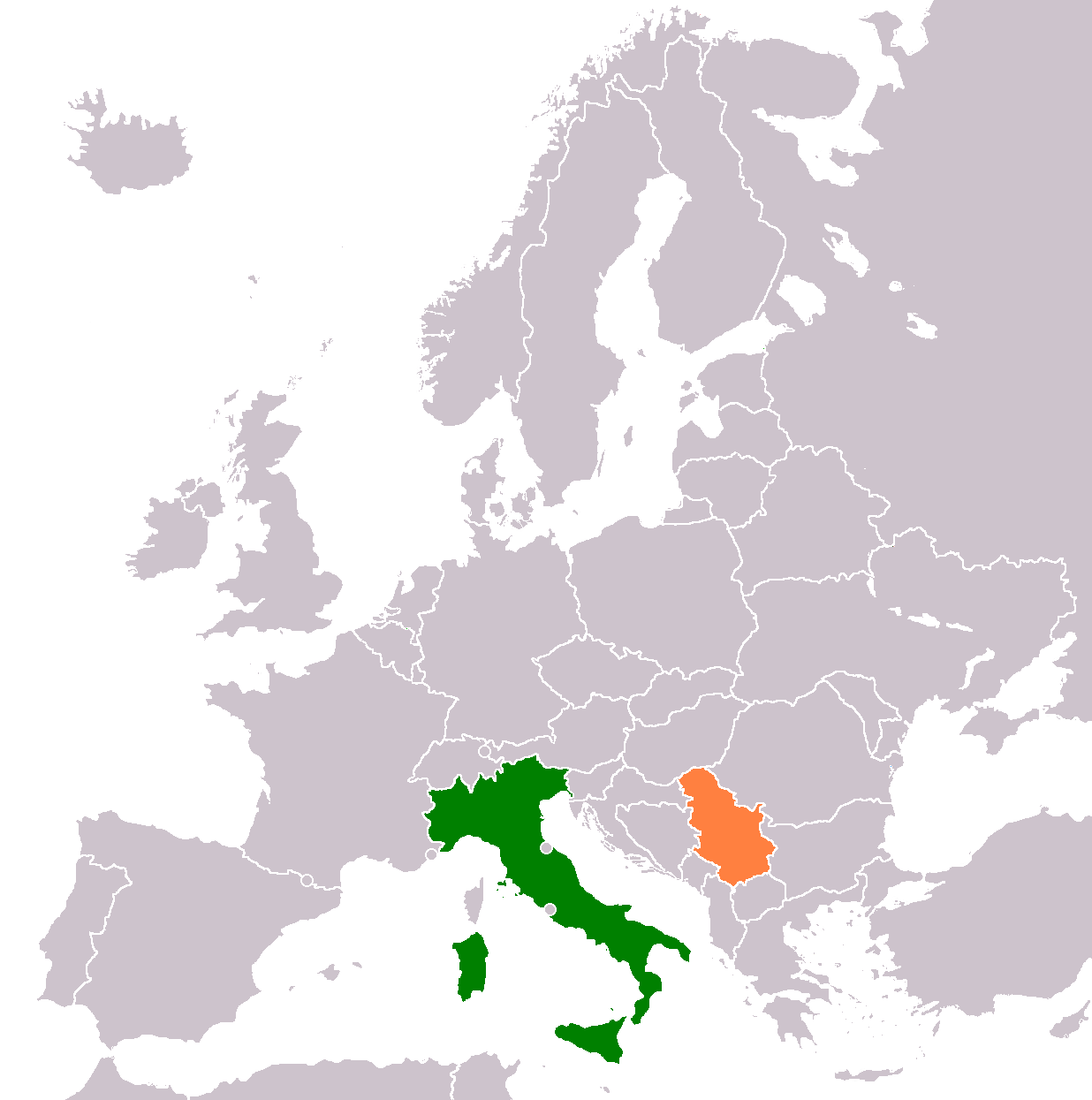
- Italy: Serbia

Italy and Serbia and maintain diplomatic relations established in 1879. From 1918 to 2006, Italy maintained relations with the Kingdom of Yugoslavia, the Socialist Federal Republic of Yugoslavia (SFRY), and the Federal Republic of Yugoslavia (FRY) (later Serbia and Montenegro), of which Serbia is considered shared (SFRY) or sole (FRY) legal successor.

== History ==
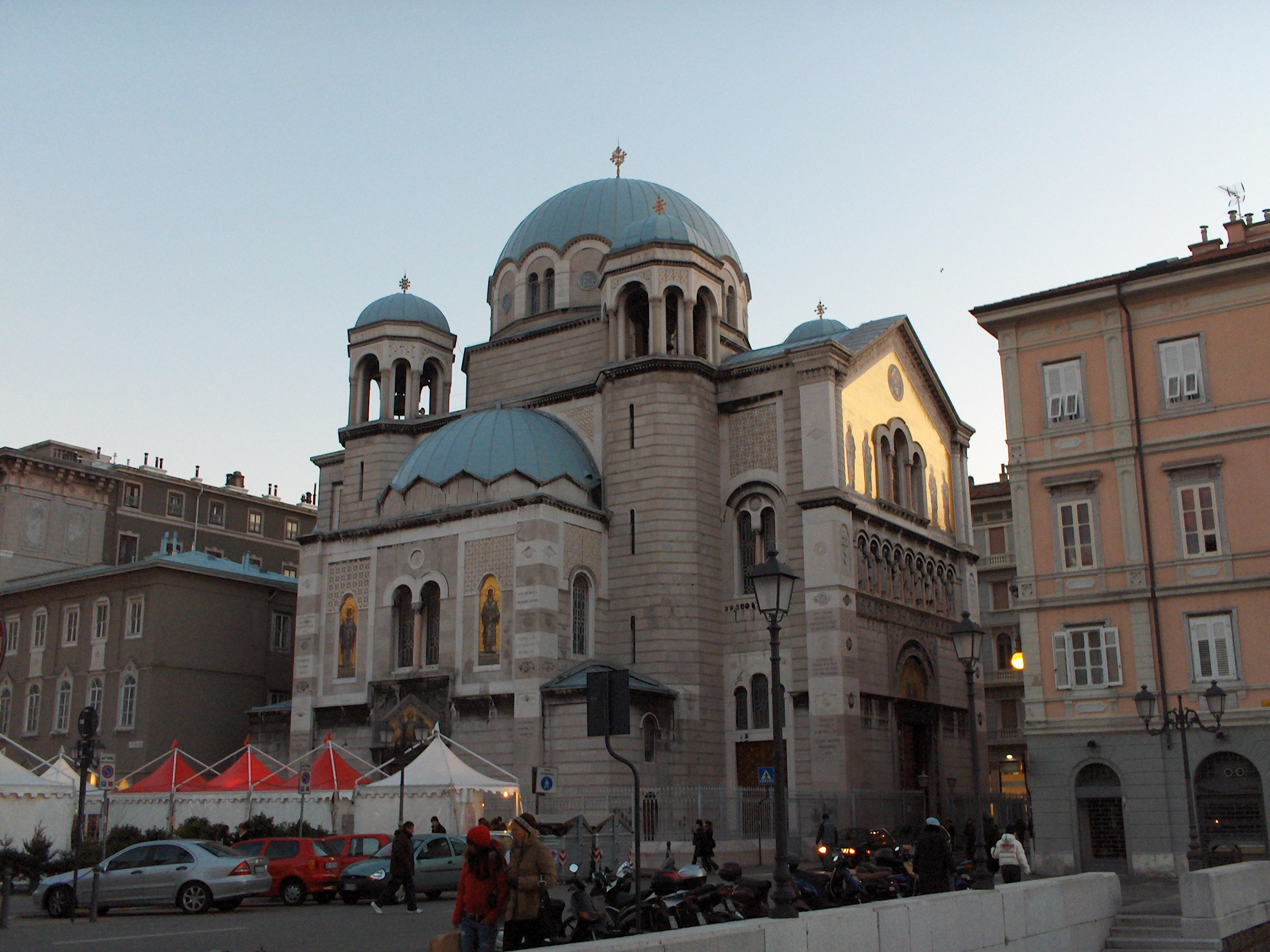
Serbian Orthodox Saint Spyridon Church in Trieste

Economic, social and political interactions between Italian Peninsula and Balkan Peninsula are of historical longue durée and were intensive ever since the Roman Empire conquered of the region. Grand Prince of Serbia Stefan the First-Crowned (1165–1228) coronation was performed by a legate of Pope Urban II which led some Serbian historians to conclude that Stefan underwent both Catholic and Orthodox coronations, but modern scholars tend to agree that only the papal one took place. Stefan's third wife, Venetian noblewoman Anna Dandolo, became Queen of Serbia and was mother to Stefan Uroš I. Popular legend claims that the Žiča Monastery, seat of the Serbian Orthodox Church between 1219 and 1253, was intentionally constructed on the halfway between Rome and Constantinople.

Principality of Serbia held friendly relations with Kingdom of Sardinia and drew the inspiration and lessons for the Serbian unification from the Italian unification, in which Kingdom of Sardinia played an important part. Italian movement became the main example for United Serb Youth, which took inspiration from Mazzini’s movement. Until the 1860s Serbia and Italy both pursued anti-Austrian politics, which made the two countries closer. Following the Austro-Hungarian Compromise of 1867 Italy supported Serbian leadership as the Piedmont of the South Slavs with Prince Mihailo Obrenović as its leader. During the Congress of Berlin Italy supported Serbia's request for independence but did not support other request made by Serbian leadership.

When World War I started Italian Minister of Foreign Affairs Antonino Paternò Castello, Marchese di San Giuliano pursued a generally cautious policy and Italian greater presence in the region via various investments and construction of railways. The next Minister of Foreign Affairs Sidney Sonnino did not follow up on his policies but rather wanted to expand Italy's territories on the Adriatic (mainly Montenegro, Dalmatia and Albania), which was opposed to the Serbian policy of unification.

=== Yugoslav period ===
In 1915, the Kingdom of Italy signed the secret Treaty of London with members of the Triple Entente. According to the pact, Italy was to declare war against the Triple Alliance; in exchange, she was to receive the Julian March, northern Dalmatia and the protectorate over Albania.

In 1918, Ante Trumbić, of the Yugoslav Committee and the Italian representative, Andrea Torre, signed an agreement which clearly stated that the future border between the Kingdom of Yugoslavia (the union of the Kingdom of Serbia and the State of Slovenes, Croats and Serbs) would be decided in a democratic way.

In 1918, after the surrender of Austria-Hungary following the Armistice of Villa Giusti, Italy occupied militarily the Julian March, Istria, the Kvarner Gulf and Dalmatia, all Austro-Hungarian territories. On the Dalmatian coast, Italy established the Governorate of Dalmatia, which had the provisional aim of ferrying the territory towards full integration into the Kingdom of Italy, progressively importing national legislation in place of the previous one.

However, the Treaty of London was nullified in the Treaty of Versailles due to the objections of American president Woodrow Wilson. Italy received only the Julian March, the Dalmatian city of Zara (Zadar), as well as the islands of Cherso (Cres), Lussino (Lošinj) and Lagosta (Lastovo). A large number of Dalmatian Italians, (allegedly nearly 20,000), moved from the areas of Dalmatia assigned to Yugoslavia and resettled in Italy (mainly in Zara). Following the conclusion of World War I and the disintegration of Austria-Hungary, Dalmatia became part of the newly formed Kingdom of Serbs, Croats and Slovenes (later renamed the Kingdom of Yugoslavia).

After the failure of a border agreement at the Paris Peace Conference, discussions continued between the Kingdom of Italy and the Kingdom of Yugoslavia. During 1920 the Italian government was under internal pressure to expand her borders as fair compensation for war victims and war debt. An example of this pressure was the publication of a forged letter purporting to be from Abraham Lincoln to Macedonio Melloni, in which Lincoln had apparently acknowledged all the coast between Venice and Cattaro as Italian national territory. Relations seemed to settle with the signing of the Treaty of Rapallo, the annexation by Italy of the Free State of Fiume and the evacuation of the Governorate of Dalmatia.

Relations with the Kingdom of Yugoslavia were severely affected and constantly remained tense, because of the dispute over Dalmatia and over the city-port of Fiume (Rijeka). It had become a free state according to the League of Nations, but was occupied by some Italian rebels led by the writer Gabriele d'Annunzio. In 1924 the city was divided between Italy and Yugoslavia (the Treaty of Rapallo). Fascism came to Italy in 1922. Their policies included nationalistic Italianization courses of action, under which minority rights were severely reduced.

The Invasion of Yugoslavia in World War II was the Axis powers' attack on the Kingdom of Yugoslavia which began on 6 April 1941. The invasion ended with the unconditional surrender of the Royal Yugoslav Army on 17 April 1941, the annexation and occupation of the region by the Axis powers and the creation of the Independent State of Croatia (Nezavisna Država Hrvatska, or NDH). Italy annexed the area constituting the province of Ljubljana, the area merged with the province of Fiume and the areas making up the second Governorate of Dalmatia.

The end of the war on the Italian-Yugoslav border, after the Italian capitulation on 8 September 1943, was marked by the foibe massacres (perpetrated by Yugoslav partisans) that took place mainly in Istria from 1946 to 1949, the Istrian–Dalmatian exodus, which involved the emigration of around 350,000 Istrian Italians and Dalmatian Italians, and the issue of Trieste.

The Socialist Federal Republic of Yugoslavia was one of only two European countries that were liberated by its own forces during World War II, with limited assistance and participation by the Allies. It received support from the Western democracies and the Soviet Union, and at the end of the war no foreign troops were stationed on its soil. Partly as a result, the country found itself halfway between the two camps at the onset of the Cold War.

In 1947–1948, the Soviet Union attempted to command obedience from Yugoslavia, primarily on issues of foreign policy, which resulted in the Tito–Stalin split and almost ignited an armed conflict. A period of very cool relations with the Soviet Union followed, during which the US and the UK considered persuading Yugoslavia into the newly formed NATO. This changed in 1953 with the Trieste crisis, a tense dispute between Yugoslavia and the Western Allies over the eventual Yugoslav-Italian border (see Free Territory of Trieste), and with Yugoslav-Soviet reconciliation in 1956. This ambivalent position at the start of the Cold War matured into the non-aligned foreign policy which Yugoslavia actively espoused until its dissolution.

The issue of the status of Trieste was finally settled with the 1975 Treaty of Osimo, signed by the two countries in Osimo, Italy, to definitely divide the Free Territory of Trieste between the two states. The treaty was based on the memorandum of understanding signed in London in 1954, which had handed over the civil administration of Zone A to Italy and Zone B to Yugoslavia. Zone A, including the city of Trieste, became the Italian Province of Trieste, but Yugoslavia was granted free access to its port.

=== Breakup of Yugoslavia ===
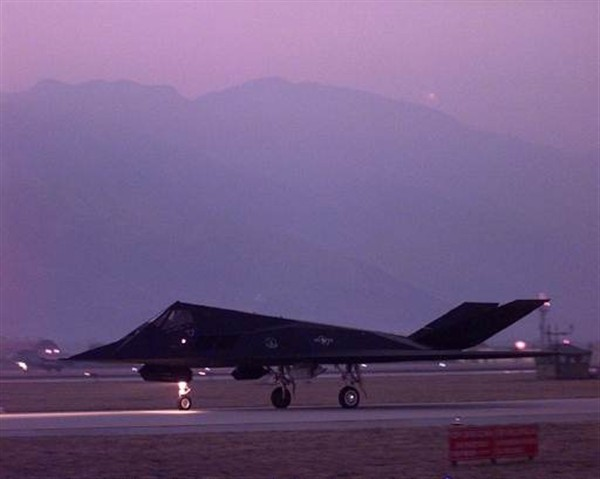
F-117 Nighthawk before taking off from Aviano Air Base in 1999 as part of NATO operations against Serbia

In the initial phase of the Breakup of Yugoslavia Members of the European Economic Community were divided over the importance they should give to the potentially contradictory principles of self-determination and territorial integrity. German Chancellor Helmut Kohl strongly stressing the right to self-determination, French President François Mitterrand arguing against immediate cutoff of aid to Yugoslavia, while Spain, Italy and United Kingdom insisted on the territorial integrity of Yugoslavia. In the period following the breakup of Yugoslavia Italy perceived Belgrade as an ally for diplomatic leverage on newly independent Croatia and Slovenia in advocating rights of Istrian Italians and recognition of Istrian-Dalmatian exodus while in addition Italian left showed sympathy towards the country under international sanctions. Staff size at the Italian Embassy in Belgrade barely changed between years 1990 and 2010.

Relations between Italy and the Federal Republic of Yugoslavia (Serbia-Montenegro) under Slobodan Milosevic's rule were cold but nevertheless continued. The Italian government bought shares in Telekom Serbia, but also took part in the 1999 NATO bombing of Yugoslavia when the NATO-member states used the Aviano Air Base in Italy from where military aeroplanes dropped bombs onto Yugoslavia. Italian participation was perceived as a major rapture in relations, yet Rome decided to participate in NATO bombing as it enabled Italy to get a primary role in the aftermath of the war. 1999 NATO bombing of Yugoslavia was the first NATO intervention led by Italian officials and the country was the second largest contributing state of the NATO Kosovo Force. This offered an opportunity for Italy to regain a more central role in Mediterranean diplomacy which particularly materialized in UNIFIL Lebanon. Italy and Serbia quickly normalized relations after the overthrow of Slobodan Milošević and Rome becoming one of the first supporters of Serbia's European integrations.

In 2008, Italy recognized unilateral declaration of independence of Kosovo which in previous days was recognized by France, United Kingdom, United States and Germany as well. This was perceived as a second major blow to the relations after 1999 intervention and Serbia recalled its ambassador for a couple of months but subsequently normalized relations.

== Political relations ==
Italy is a European Union member state which strongly supports the accession of Serbia to the European Union.

Former Italian Minister of Foreign Affairs and at the time High Representative of the Union for Foreign Affairs and Security Policy Federica Mogherini facilitated Belgrade–Pristina negotiations. In an effort to reach final comprehensive agreement between two sides Mogherini was open to the idea of Partition of Kosovo but the agreement was not reached due to Kosovo's announcement of a 10% and subsequently 100% tariffs on goods imported from Serbia and Bosnia-Herzegovina. In 2016 Italy was represented in Belgrade with 25 diplomats, just behind Russia, United States, China, and Germany, but more than United Kingdom, France, Turkey, or Serbian diplomatic allies in Europe such as Greece and Spain. Comparatively high Italian presence was explained with growing economic ties, Serbia's role in Western Balkans and Italian leading role in developing the best possible NATO–Serbia relations short of membership.

In 2020, Serbia sent eight planes with medical aid to Italy, due to the COVID-19 pandemic; aid package included two million epidemiological masks, two million surgical masks, four million gloves and 100,000 suits.

== Economic relations ==
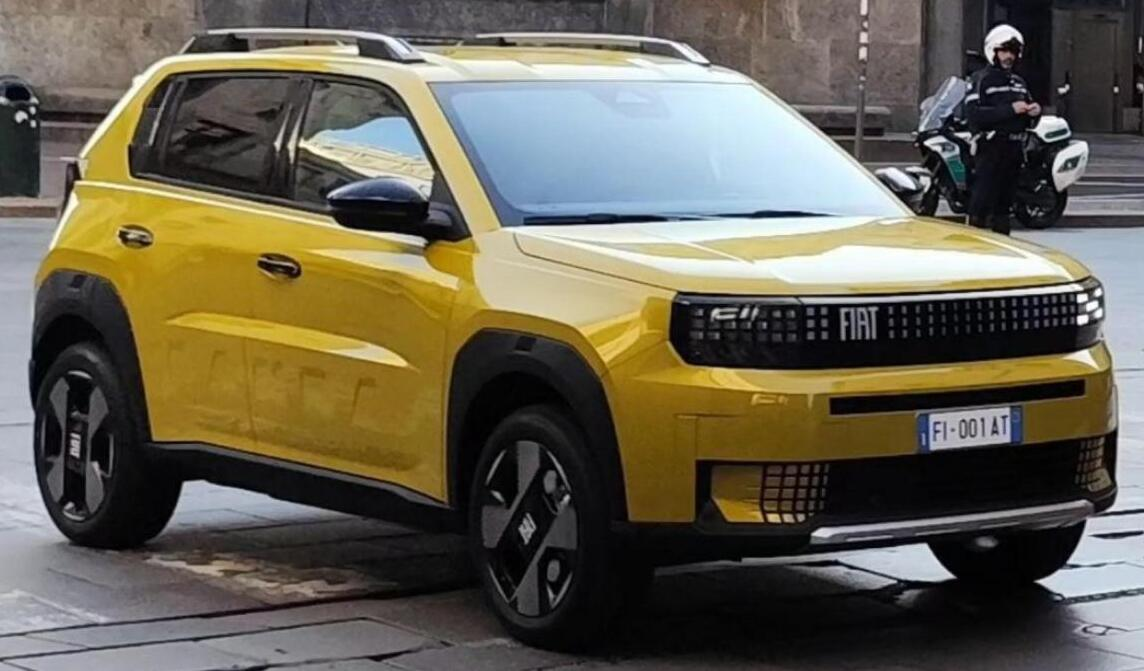
The Fiat Grande Panda, manufactured in Kragujevac

Italy is the third biggest trading partner of Serbia. Trade between two countries amounted to $4.8 billion in 2023; Italy's merchandise exports to Serbia were about $2.9 billion; Serbian exports were standing at roughly $1.9 billion.

Italy is one of a leading foreign investors in Serbia with more than a thousand Italian companies employing approximately 40,000 people. Italian companies invested largely in the financial sector: there are two Italian banks (Banca Intesa and UniCredit Bank, the largest and fourth-largest bank, respectively) and insurance company (Generali, the second-largest insurance company) operating on Serbian market. Significant Italian manufacturing companies present in Serbia include Stellantis (automobile plant in Kragujevac), and Ariston (heating systems plant in Niš).

== Cultural cooperation ==
Istituto Italiano di Cultura, cultural centre devoted to the Italian culture and Italian language has been operating in Belgrade since 1940.

== Immigration from Serbia ==
There are some 30,000 Serbs living in Italy, predominately in northern regions. Trieste has historical presence of Serbs in the city, while town of Arzignano, in Vicenza province, has significant and relatively recent community of Serb immigrants coming from all over former Yugoslavia.

== Resident diplomatic missions ==
- Italy has an embassy in Belgrade.
- Serbia has an embassy in Rome and consulates general in Milan and Trieste.
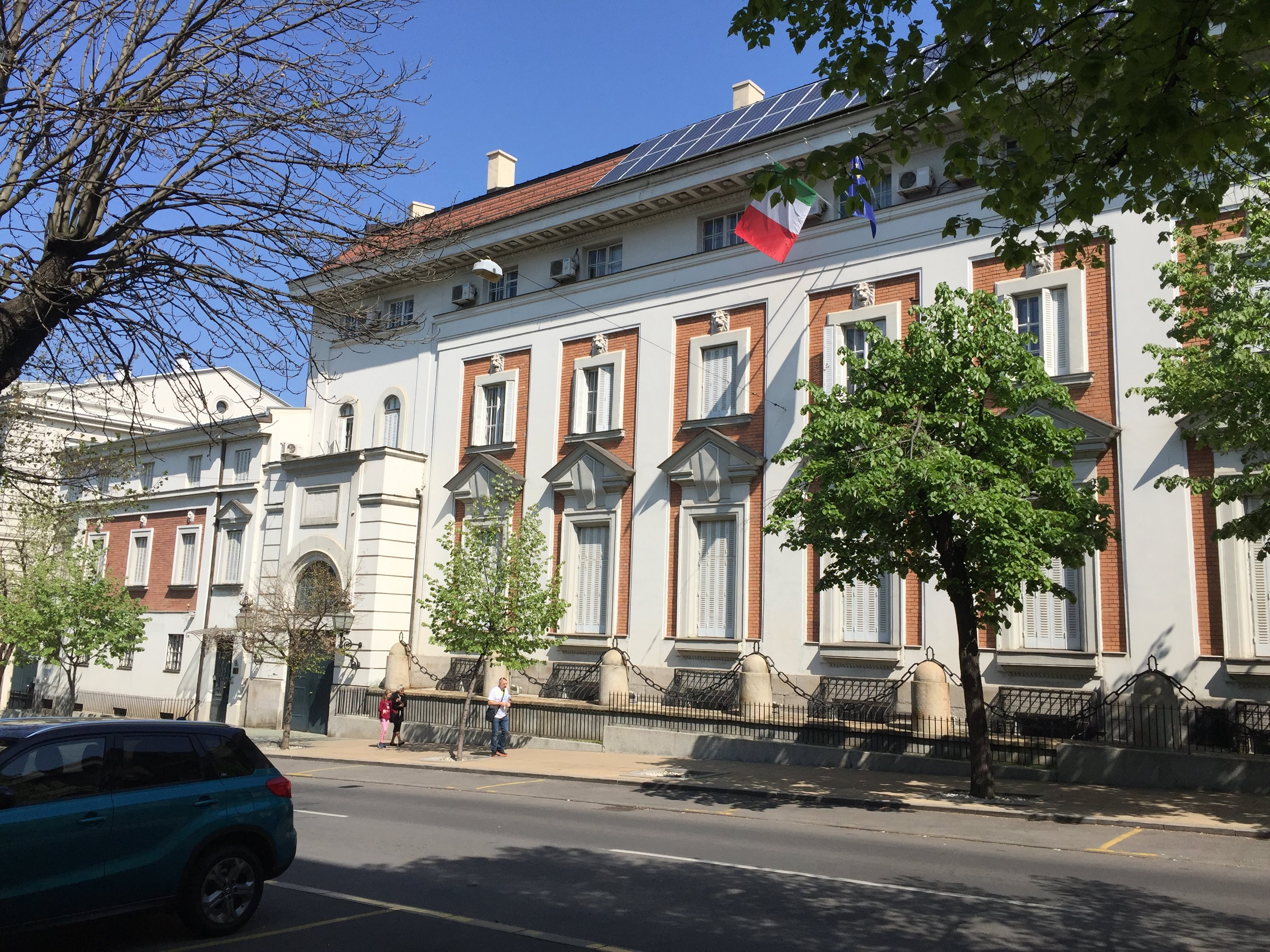
Embassy of Italy in Belgrade

== See also ==
- Foreign relations of Italy
- Foreign relations of Serbia
- Italy–Yugoslavia relations

== Sources ==
- Kalić, Jovanka (2006). "La Serbie et l'Italie au XII siécle". Глас САНУ. 404 (13): 85–94.
