= Dušan T. Bataković =

Serbian diplomat and historian

- Born: 23 April 1957; Belgrade, PR Serbia, Yugoslavia
- Died: 27 June 2017 (aged 60); Belgrade, Serbia
- Occupation(s): Historian, academic and diplomat
- Children: 2

Dušan T. Bataković (Serbian: Душан Т. Батаковић; 23 April 1957 – 27 June 2017) was a Serbian historian and diplomat. His specialty was modern and contemporary Serbian and Balkan history as well as French-Serbian relations. The last post he held was that of Director of the Institute for Balkan Studies at the Serbian Academy of Sciences and Arts.

== Biography ==
Bataković graduated with a degree in history from the University of Belgrade Faculty of Philosophy in 1982. He earned an M.A. in history from the same institution (1988). He received his Ph.D. in history from the University of Paris IV: Paris-Sorbonne in 1997 with the thesis La France et la formation de la démocratie parlementaire en Serbie 1830–1914 (France and the Formation of Parliamentary Democracy in Serbia, 1830–1914).

Bataković is a specialist for nineteenth- and twentieth-century Balkan history, as well as for the French-Serbian relations. He has written and published extensively on the modern and contemporary history of Serbia, in particular Kosovo and Albania–Serbia relations, focusing on nationalism, and the origins of religious and ethnic strife. Another area of his research is the impact of communism on the contemporary history of Serbia, Yugoslavia and the Balkans. Bataković writes in Serbian, English and French and his bibliography includes dozens of historical monographs, edited volumes and more than a hundred articles published in various languages.

Bataković is also the author of the historical TV documentary Crveno doba (The Red Epoch), which aired on Serbia's public broadcaster, RTS, in 2004. Combining testimonies of witnesses with historic narrative the film was the first to open the question of the crimes of the communist Yugoslav authorities (the "red terror") against their political and class enemies in post-World War II Serbia and Montenegro (1944–1947).

In October 2005 Bataković became Director of the Institute for Balkan Studies of the Serbian Academy of Sciences and Arts and editor-in-chief of the Institute's annual Balcanica journal as well as of its Special editions. In October 2008 he was elected president of the Serbian Committee of AIESEE (Association Internationale d'Etudes du Sud-Est Europeen).

In 2006, a study by Frederick Anscombe looked at issues surrounding scholarship on Kosovo which noted that in the 1980s and 1990s Dušan Bataković published works written from a nationalist perspective on Kosovo, that gained generous support. Of those were works such as The Kosovo Chronicles (1992) and Kosovo, la spirale de la haine (1993) and in all several of those works have been translated into other languages.

Parallel to his academic life, Bataković also pursued a career in politics and diplomacy. As the president of the Council for Democratic Changes in Serbia (a pro-democracy NGO), he campaigned against Slobodan Milošević. He advocated for cantonisation of Kosovo as the solution to the Kosovo crisis in the late 1990s.

From 2001 to 2005 he served as Ambassador of the Federal Republic of Yugoslavia (later Serbia and Montenegro) to the Hellenic Republic. In July 2005 he became Advisor for political issues to the President of Serbia Boris Tadić. In that capacity he became a member, in November 2005, of the Serbian negotiating team at the UN-sponsored talks on the future status of the province of Kosovo in Vienna. He was a head of the Serbian Delegation at the International Court of Justice, regarding the advisory opinion on Kosovo status (2009–2011).

In 2010 Bataković was elected fellow of the World Academy of Art and Science.

Bataković was appointed Ambassador of Serbia to Canada in July 2007 and Ambassador of Serbia in Paris, France in January 2009, where he took office in March 2009 and completed his mandate in December 2012.

Bataković was reelected Director of the Institute for Balkan Studies of the Serbian Academy of Sciences and Arts in February 2013.

== Awards and reception ==
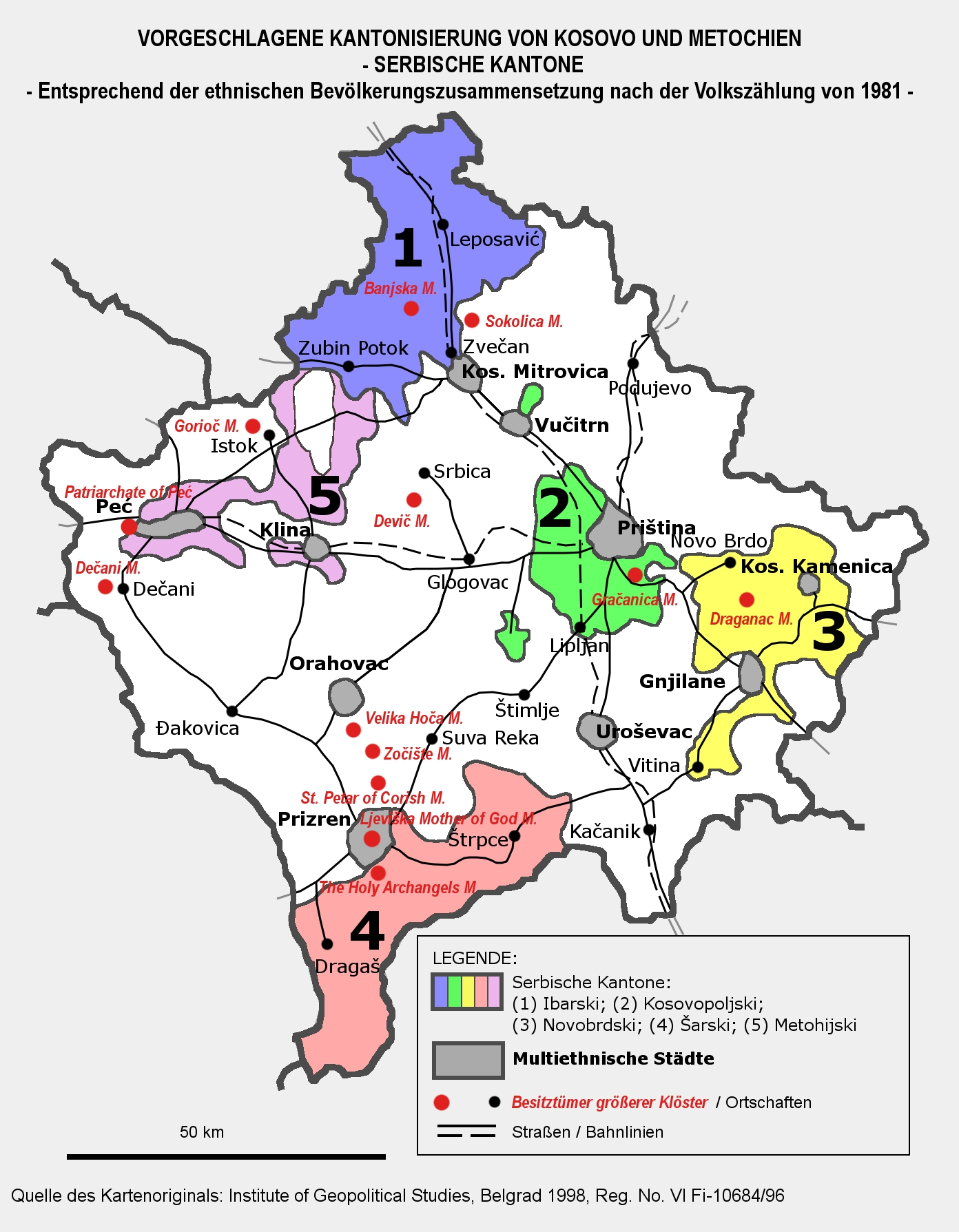
Proposed Cantonization of Kosovo and Metohija by Bataković

His decorations include:

- – Ordre des Palmes académiques
- – Order of the Phoenix
- – Order of the White Eagle
- – Order of Karađorđe's Star

== Works ==
- Dečansko pitanje (The Dečani Question), Belgrade: Historical Institute-Prosveta 1989. (second updated edition: Belgrade: Čigoja štampa 2007), 355 p. ISBN 978-86-7558-450-6
- Savremenici o Kosovu i Metohiji 1850–1912 (Contemporaries on Kosovo and Metohija 1850–1912), Belgrade: Srpska književna zadruga 1989.
- Kolubarska bitka (The Battle of Kolubara 1914), Belgrade: Litera 1989 (with N. B. Popović). 210 p.
- Kosovo i Metohija u srpskoj istoriji (Kosovo and Metohia in Serbian History), Belgrade: Srpska književna zadruga 1989, (co-author); German translation: Kosovo und Metochien in der serbischen Geschichte, Lausanne: L'Age d'Homme 1989 (co-author; four chapters); French translation: Le Kosovo-Metohija dans l'histoire serbe, Lausanne: L'Age d'Homme 1990 (co-author, four chapters). ISBN 2-8251-0139-7
- Kosovo i Metohija u srpsko-arbanaškim odnosima (Kosovo and Metohija in Serb-Albanian Relations), Priština: Jedinstvo 1991. ISBN 86-7019-071-0. (2nd updated edition: Čigoja štampa, Belgrade 2006.) 391 р. ISBN 86-7558-436-9
- Bataković, Dušan T. (1992). The Kosovo Chronicles. Belgrade: Plato.ISBN 86-447-0006-5
- Bataković, Dušan T. (1993). Kosovo, la spirale de la haine: Les faits, les acteurs, l'histoire (1. ed.). Lausanne: L'Age d'Homme. ISBN 9782825103890.
  - Bataković, Dušan T. (1998). Kosovo, la spirale de la haine: Les faits, les acteurs, l'histoire (2. ed.). Lausanne: L'Age d'Homme. ISBN 9782825111321. ISBN 2-8251-1132-5
- La Yougoslavie : nations, religions, idéologies, Lausanne: L'Age d'Homme 1994. ISBN 978-2-8251-0534-4
- Bataković, Dušan T. (1996). The Serbs of Bosnia & Herzegovina: History and Politics. Paris: Dialogue. ISBN 9782911527104.
- The Serbs and Their National Interest, N. Von Ragenfeld-Feldman & D. T. Batakovic (eds.), San Francisco & Belgrade 1997, 140 p. ISBN 86-901887-1-1
- Cronica de la Kosovo, prefaţă de academician Dan Berindei; Buçuresti: Editura biblioteca bucurestilor 1999, 207 p. ISBN 973-99243-0-1
- Kosovo i Metohija. Istorija i ideologija, (Kosovo and Metohija: History and Ideology), Belgrade: Hrišćanska misao 1998. (2nd updated edition: Belgrade: Čigoja štampa 2006). 469 p. ISBN 978-86-7558-523-7
- Нова историја српског народа (A New History of the Serbian People), Belgrade: Naš Dom 2000 (co-authors: A. Fotić, M. St. Protić, N. Samardžić); Second updated edition: Belgrade 2002, ISBN 86-7268-015-4; Korean translation: Seoul 2001, ISBN 89-89205-20-4;
- Bataković, Dušan T., ed. (2005). Histoire du peuple serbe. Lausanne: L’Age d’Homme. ISBN 9782825119587. ISBN 2-8251-1958-X
- Bataković, Dušan T., ed. (2007). Kosovo and Metohija: Living in the Enclave (PDF). Belgrade: Institute for Balkan Studies.
- Kosovo. Un conflit sans fin? Lausanne: L'Age d'Homme 2008. 322 p. ISBN 978-2-8251-3875-5
- Kosovo And Metohija. Living in the Enclave (with added multimedia content and original documents) D. T. Bataković (ed.), Institute for Balkan Studies, Serbian Academy of Sciences and Arts, Belgrade 2008. (cd-rom) ISBN 978-86-7179-064-2
- La Serbie et la France : une alliance atypique. Les relations politiques, économiques et culturelles,1870-1940 D. T. Bataković (dir.), Institut des Études Balkaniques, Académie serbe des Sciences et des Arts, Belgrade 2010. 613.p. ISBN 978-86-7179-061-1
- Косово и Метохия : история и идеология, перевод с сербского Д. Кокотович, Екатеринбург : Издательство Уральского университета, 2014, 399 p. ISBN 978-5-7996-1269-6
- Minorities in the Balkans. State Policy and Inter-Ethnic Relations (1804–2004) D. T. Bataković (ed.), Belgrade, Institute for Balkan Studies, Serbian Academy of Sciences and Arts, 2011, 364 p. ISBN 978-86-7179-068-0
- Serbia's Kosovo Drama. A Historical Perspective, Belgrade, Čigoja Štampa, 2012, 369 p. ISBN 978-86-7558-903-7
- Qeveria serbe dhe Esat Pashe Toptani, e perktheu nga anglishtja Maklen Misha, Tirane, Botimet IDK, [2012], 70 p. ISBN 9789928136114
- Les sources françaises de la democratie serbe (1804–1914), Paris, CNRS Editions, 2013, 570 p. ISBN 978-2-271-07080-7
- Bataković, Dušan T. (2014). A Turbulent Decade: The Serbs in Post-1999 Kosovo: Destruction of Cultural Heritage, Ethnic Cleansing, and Marginalization (1999–2009). Paris: Dialogue. ISBN 9782911527128. ISBN 2-911527-12-7
- The Foreign Policy of Serbia (1844–1867). Ilija Garašanin's Načertanije, Institute for Balkan Studies SASA, Belgrade 2014, 308 p. ISBN 978-86-7179-089-5
- Bataković, Dušan T. (2015). "Kosovo and Metohija: History, Memory and Identity". The Christian Heritage of Kosovo and Metohija: the Historical and Spiritual Heartland of the Serbian People. Los Angeles: Sebastian Press. pp. 569–608. ISBN 9788682685395. ISBN 978-86-82685-39-5
- Bataković, Dušan T. (2015). "The Serbs of Kosovo and Metohija 1999–2007: Surviving in Ghetto-like Enclaves". The Christian Heritage of Kosovo and Metohija: the Historical and Spiritual Heartland of the Serbian People. Los Angeles: Sebastian Press. pp. 935–945. ISBN 9788682685395.
- Serbia in the Great War. Anglo-Saxon Testimonies and Historical Analysis. Edited by Dušan T. Bataković, Belgrade: National Library of Serbia 2015, 374 p. ISBN 978-86-7035-332-9
- Srbija i Balkan. Albanija, Bugarska, Grčka 1914–1918 (Serbia and the Balkans: Albania, Bulgaria, Greece 1914–1918), Prometej-RTS, Novi Sad-Belgrade 2016, 572 р. ISBN 978-86-515-1174-8
- Dešifrovanje prošlosti. Pisci, svedoci, pojave (Deciphering the Past. Witnesses, Writers, Phenomenons), Čigoja štampa, Belgrade 2016, 436 р. ISBN 978-86-531-0264-7
- Zlatna nit postojanja, Catena Mundi, Belgrade, 2018, 348 p. ISBN 978-86-6343-093-8

== Sources ==
- Anscombe, Frederick (2006). "The Ottoman Empire in Recent International Politics – II: The Case of Kosovo" (PDF). The International History Review. 28 (4): 758–793. doi:10.1080/07075332.2006.9641103. JSTOR 40109813. S2CID 154724667.
- Zeljan Šuster, Historical Dictionary of the Federal Republic of Yugoslavia, The Scarecrow Press, Landham & London 1999, p. 43
- Sima M. Ćirković, Rade Mihaljčić (ed.), Enciklopedija srpske istoriografije, Knowledge, Belgrade 1997, p. 273
- Slobodan Georgijev, ”Dusan Batakovic: A Historian of the Present”, Balkan Insight, Dec. 2009
