= France–Kosovo relations =

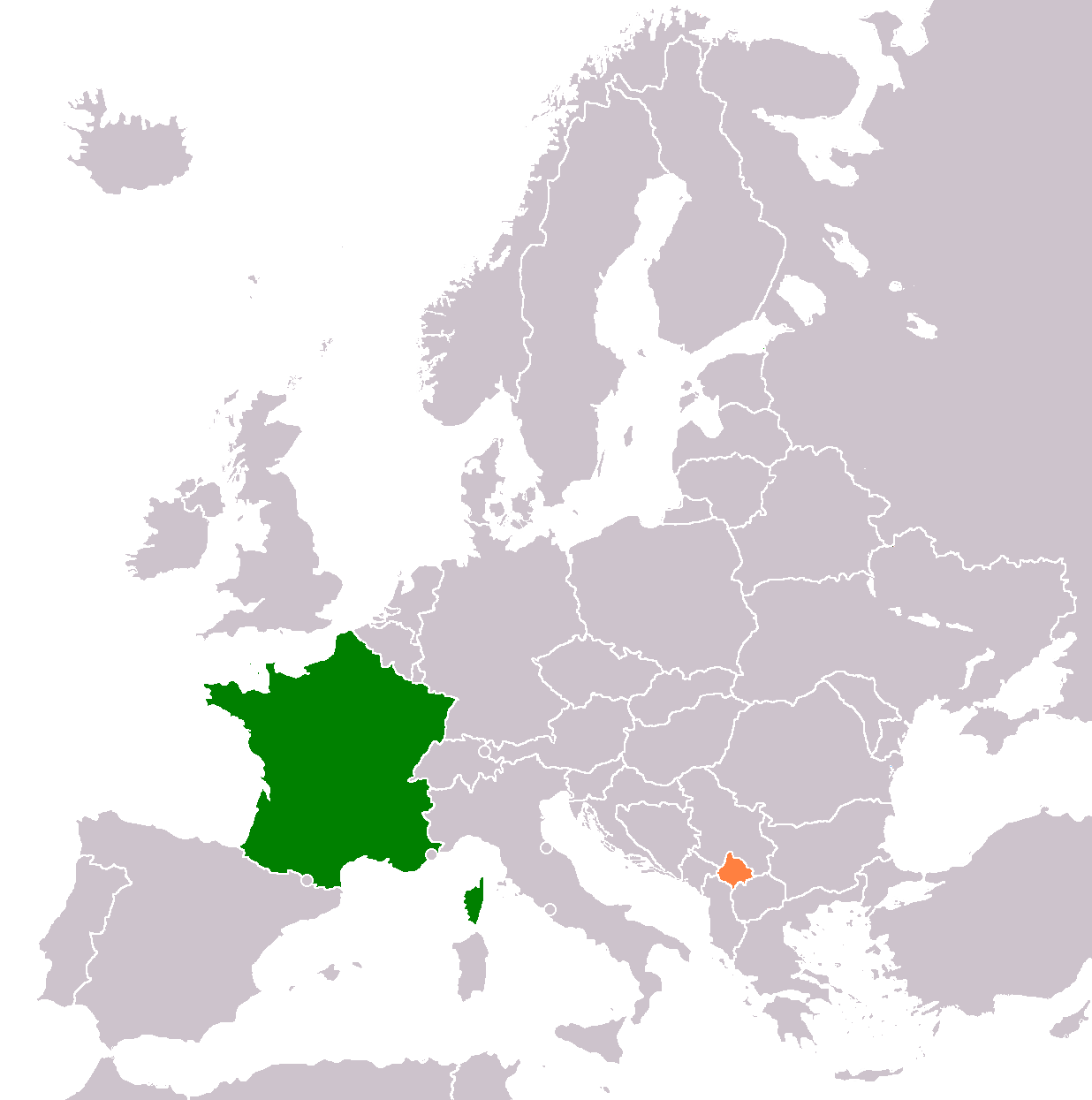
- France: Kosovo

Diplomatic mission
- French Embassy, Pristina: Embassy of Kosovo, Paris

Envoy
- Ambassador Marie-Christine Butel: Ambassador Mehdi Halimi

France–Kosovo relations are the bilateral relations between the French Republic and the Republic of Kosovo. When Kosovo declared its independence from Serbia on 17 February 2008, France became one of the first countries to officially recognize the sovereignty of Kosovo. In a letter addressed to Fatmir Sejdiu, the President of the Republic of Kosovo, French President Nicolas Sarkozy officially recognized Kosovo as a sovereign and independent nation. This recognition took effect immediately and was in full alignment with a statement issued by European Ministers for Foreign Affairs in Brussels on the same day.

After two years, the International Court of Justice (ICJ) determined that Kosovo’s declaration of independence from Serbia was not in breach of international law (ICJ, 2010). In its submission to the ICJ, France reiterated its stance:

"France made an irreversible decision to recognize Kosovo as a state the day following its declaration of independence. This move was echoed by over 55 other UN Member States, including 22 from the European Union. By recognizing Kosovo’s sovereignty, France affirmed the conclusion of a political process that had started in 1999. At the same time, this act represented a commitment to building a forward-looking relationship with an independent Kosovo, as well as with the broader Balkans region, turning the page on the tragic conflicts of the 1990s". At present France has an embassy in Pristina, whereas Kosovo has an embassy in Paris.

== Political relations ==
Kosovo has significantly benefited from France’s political support. According to the Ministry of Foreign Affairs, political stability is essential for Kosovo to function effectively, and the assistance of the Quint States has been crucial for its political progress. As a member of the Contact Group prior to Kosovo’s independence, France strongly adhered to the 2005 Guiding Principles. Following Kosovo's declaration of independence in 2008, France collaborated closely with the Kosovo government to implement these principles, focusing on multi-ethnicity, the rule of law, human rights, and security. These principles have become deeply ingrained in the bilateral political relationship and continue to shape France’s political engagement with Kosovo.

France has also played a vital role in supporting Kosovo’s foreign policy objectives. Securing international recognition for Kosovo has been a primary focus. In 2009, Bernard Kouchner, then Minister of Foreign Affairs under Sarkozy presidency, highlighted France’s concern over the challenges Kosovo faced in gaining recognition and openly pledged his support to Kosovo’s Prime Minister Hashim Thaçi. Other key priorities for Kosovo, such as gaining membership in international organizations, including the United Nations, and eventual integration into the European Union, have also received consistent backing from France. France has frequently advocated for Kosovo in international forums, including the European Council and other international organizations.

However, the effectiveness of France’s individual initiatives is somewhat constrained by the framework of multilateral and international organizations that govern global politics today. While France’s direct support for Kosovo is evident, its contributions have often been amplified through its role in larger bodies. Whether as part of the Contact Group, the International Steering Group until the conclusion of international supervision in October 2012, or the EU-led dialogue, France’s involvement has largely been carried out within a broader multilateral context. This approach has not only helped to legitimize France’s political stance but has also strengthened the impact of its support through a collective, unified voice.

== Military ==
France participated in the 1999 NATO bombing of Yugoslavia, which resulted in a UN administration of Kosovo and then to eventual independence. France currently has 1,368 troops serving in Kosovo as peacekeepers in the NATO led Kosovo Force. Originally, there were 7,000 French troops in KFOR. Marcel Valentin was the 6th KFOR Commander from 3 October 2001 until 4 October 2002. Yves de Kermabon was the 9th KFOR Commander from 1 September 2004 until 1 September 2005. Xavier de Marnhac was the 12th KFOR Commander from 31 August 2007 until 29 August 2008.

== Economic relations ==
Despite the relatively small scale of French-Kosovan bilateral trade, French exports and imports have seen significant growth, increasing by 113.8% (€50.4 million) and 42.8% (€10.3 million), respectively. In 2021, France’s trade surplus with Kosovo rose to €40.2 million, marking a 145% increase, driven by the economic recovery, which the IMF estimated at 7.5% for that year. Since 2019, French exports have been steadily rising, initially led by used car sales and further strengthened in 2021 by the export of chemicals.

Kosovo ranks as France’s 156th largest supplier and 128th largest customer, while France is positioned as Kosovo’s 16th largest supplier and 15th largest customer. Key suppliers to Kosovo include Germany, Turkey, China, and Serbia, with the United States serving as its largest customer. Although France's economic presence in Kosovo remains modest, opportunities for growth could emerge through structural projects. Currently, France is the 13th largest investor in Kosovo, while Germany, Switzerland, Turkey, and the United States lead as the top investors.

== Democratization, Human Rights, and Minority Rights Protection ==
The Comprehensive Proposal for the Kosovo Status Settlement prioritized multi-ethnicity, democracy, and human rights protection from the outset. These principles became the foundation for Kosovo’s state-building process following its declaration of independence in 2008. France, as a member of the International Steering Group, strongly supported these priorities and actively participated in overseeing their implementation. From the moment it recognized Kosovo’s independence, France emphasized that democratization, human rights, and the protection of minorities, particularly the Serb minority, would be central to its engagement. This commitment was reflected in France’s active participation in organizations such as the OSCE and EULEX. During Hashim Thaçi’s 2009 visit to France, French Foreign Minister Bernard Kouchner reiterated France’s full support for minority integration and the well-being of the Serb community.

Despite its involvement in international missions, France’s role in supporting democratization and minority rights in Kosovo remains somewhat limited. Its contributions are often confined to sporadic support for a few NGOs in Serb-majority areas like north Mitrovica and Gračanica and efforts to preserve Serb cultural heritage. However, the integration of the Serb community must be given greater focus, particularly in light of the April 19th Agreement on normalization between Kosovo and Serbia. Kosovo also requires more tangible support to enhance its human rights record.

A significant step in this direction could be Kosovo’s integration into the Council of Europe. Membership would subject Kosovo to the jurisdiction of the European Court of Human Rights, a critical move for strengthening its human rights framework. However, Kosovo’s accession requires the approval of two-thirds of the Council’s 47 members, making France’s vote essential in this process.

== See also ==
- Foreign relations of France
- Foreign relations of Kosovo
- Kosovo-NATO relations
- Accession of Kosovo to the EU
- France–Serbia relations
- France–Yugoslavia relations
