= Embassy of France, Belgrade =

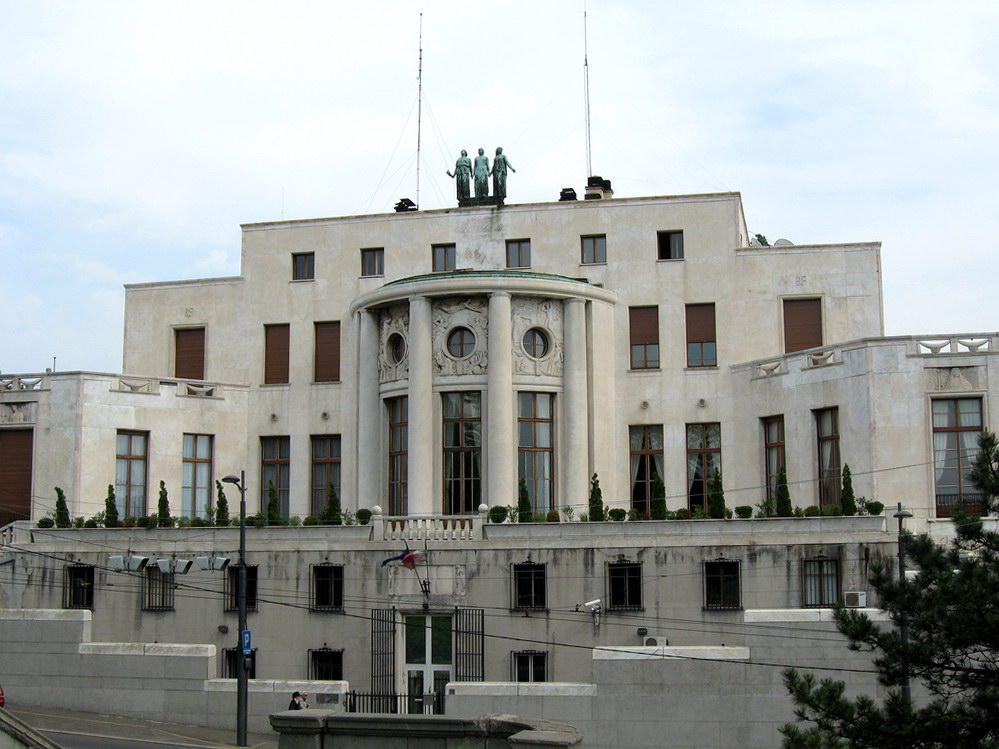
- Location: Belgrade, Serbia
- Address: 11 Pariska Street
- Coordinates: 44.8188825°N 20.4496643°E
- Website: https://rs.ambafrance.org

The Embassy of France in Belgrade is a diplomatic mission of France in Serbia, located in the capital city Belgrade.

The embassy is located between St. Michael's Cathedral and Kalemegdan in Belgrade, overlooking the Danube and the Sava. It hosts the Diplomatic Chancellery, a Consulate, a Military Attaché, residence of the Ambassador, Joint Management Service, the Press Service, and an Internal Security Service.

The building, called "Le Nouveau Banque", on the pedestrian street Knez Mihailova, houses the French Institute of Serbia, the Service of Cooperation, the Economic Mission, and the Regional Center for the Fight Against Organized Crime in Southern Afro-Eurasia.

== History ==
The building was designed by French architect Roger-Henri Expert with Serbian architect Josif Najman as assistant in 1926. At the time it was only the fourth purposely built French embassy, as it was usual to either rent or refurbish an existing building. Construction lasted from 1929 to 1933, with the inauguration night being 21 December 1935. The party had 800 guests, including Milan Stojadinović, and all high ranked government officials led by Prince Paul of Yugoslavia and Princess Olga of Greece and Denmark. The building is a complete work of Art Deco, with everything from the facade, interior, furniture, and lighting in the style.

=== Exterior ===
The slope of the site, on the front of two streets, where the building was constructed, represented the real challenge. The architect decided to solve this problem with the massive foundations, which work just like a fortification rather than the ground floor of a modern palace. Thus, a kind of optical fault has been achieved in an effective way. On a geometrically simply defined object that has a ground floor, two floors and a loft, the middle zone is broken down by a centrally set semicircular shape, and trapezoidal shaped wings. This is also the most expansive zone of the building. On the second floor and attic facade, there is a pyramidal cascade and facade without any decoration, and the viewer's view would be fixed to the bronze group, where the crown dominates the vision of the palace with white facade marble. The style of the building is typical of the inter-war period, modern elements with monumental classicism and refinement of the sculptures. The bronze finial group at the top of building represents Liberté, égalité, fraternité is 2.80m in height and was done by sculptor Charles Marie Louis Joseph Sarrabezolles. He was Experts' friend, known for casting concrete sculptures in innovative way, a method of direct carving in setting concrete, with much of his work was integrated with architecture. Side wings of facade have shallow reliefs that illustrate shortened history of France through Vercingetorix, Joan de Arc, Louis XIV and Marianne.

=== Interior ===
The building has five floors, the first two being assigned to the Chancery and the last three to the Residence de France. The vestibule, reached by a large white marble staircase, is decorated with five medallions representing the rivers of France. The original furniture is signed Jules Leleu and Raymond Subes; unfortunately some of the purposely built furniture was either lost or returned to France during World War 2.

== List of ambassadors ==
De	A	Ambassador
Kingdom of Serbia
1907	1914	Léon-Eugène-Aubin Coullard Descos
Kingdom of Serbs, Croats and Slovenes
1921	1922	Louis Frédéric Clément-Simon
Kingdom of Yugoslavia
1933	1935	Paul-Émile Naggiar
1936	1937	Robert de Dampierre
1937	1940	Raymond Brugère
1940	1940	Roger Maugras
Federal People's Republic of Yugoslavia
1944	1945	Henry Gauquié
1945	1950	Jean Payart
1950	1955	Philippe Baudet
1955	1955	Camille Coulet
1955	1956	Jean Baelen
1956	1962	Vincent Broustra
Socialist Federal Republic of Yugoslavia
1962	1965	Jean Binoche
1965	1970	Pierre Francfort
1970	1977	Pierre Sebilleau
1977	1980	Jacques Martin
1980	1982	Yves Pagniez
1982	1985	Jacques Dupuy
1985	1989	Dominique Charpy
1989	1992	Michel Chatelais
Federal Republic of Yugoslavia
1992	1992	Alain Rouillard
1996	1996	Gabriel Keller
1996	2000	Stanislas Filliol
2000	2003	Gabriel Keller
Serbia and Montenegro
2003	2007	Hugues Pernet
Serbia
2007	2010	Jean-François Terral
2010	2014	François-Xavier Deniau
2014	2017	Christine Moro
2017	2019	Frédéric Mondoloni
2019	2021	Jean-Louis Falcon
2021	2025	Pierre Cochard
2025		Florence Ferrari

== Gallery ==
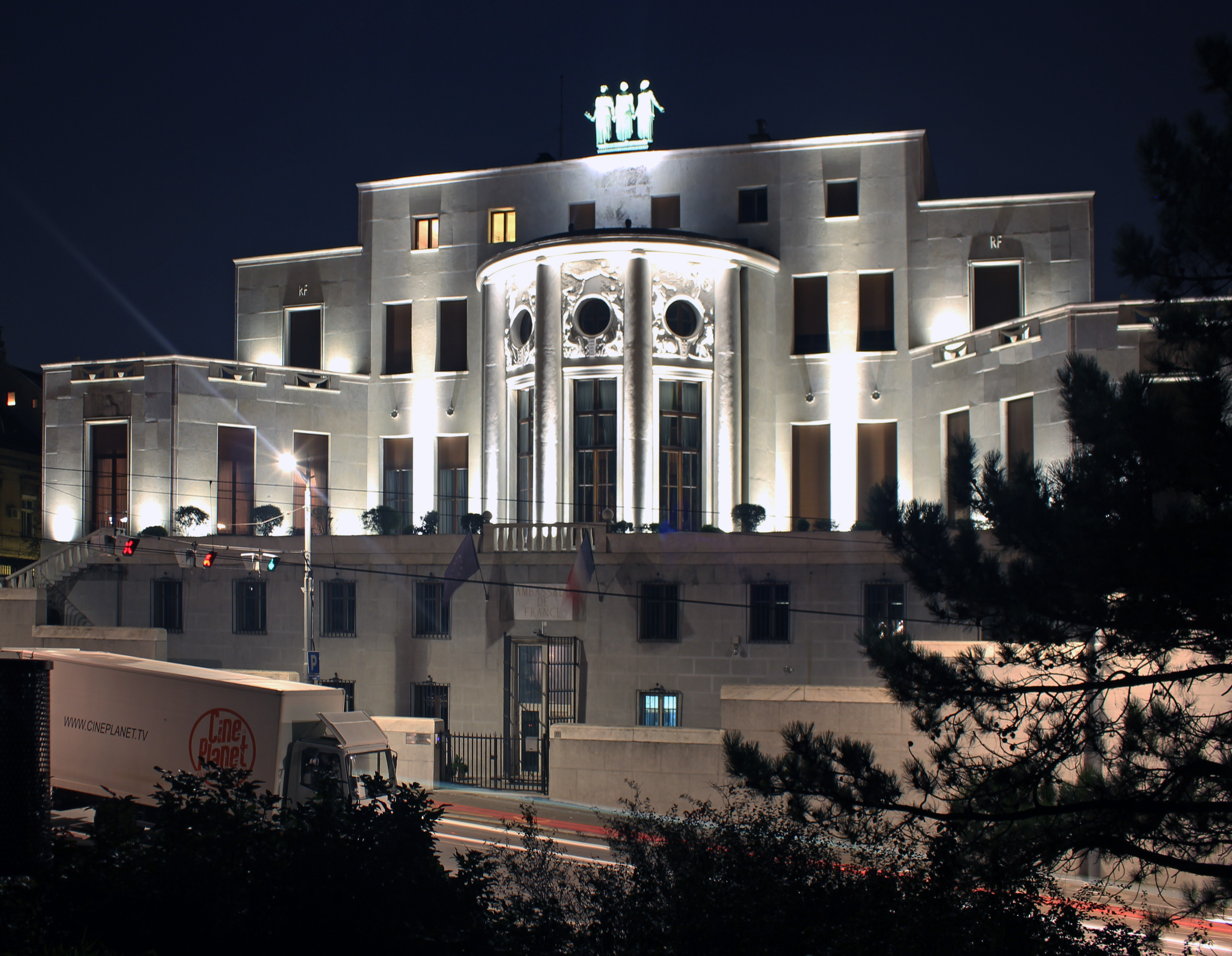

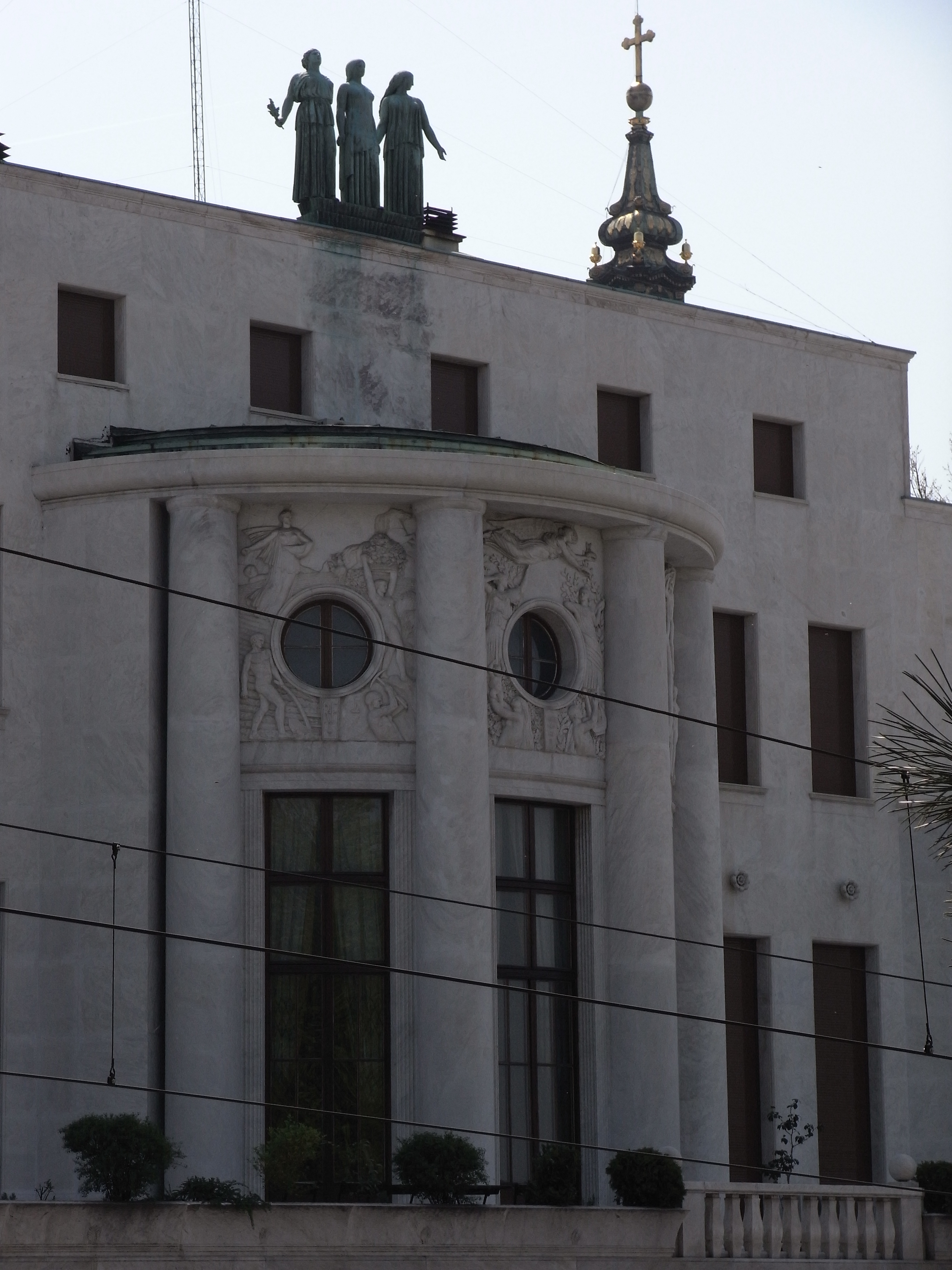

== See also ==
- France–Serbia relations
- France–Yugoslavia relations
