= France–North Macedonia relations =

- France: North Macedonia

Diplomatic mission
- France Embassy, Skopje: North Macedonia Embassy, Paris

Envoy

France–North Macedonia relations are the bilateral relations between France and North Macedonia. Both countries are members of the Council of Europe and NATO. France is an EU member and North Macedonia is an EU candidate.

== History ==
Diplomatic relations were first established on 27 December 1993 following North Macedonia's (then formerly known officially as the Republic of Macedonia) independence from Yugoslavia in 1991. Dynamic cooperation has taken place between the two countries in many areas - in the field of culture, where cooperation has been taking place since the opening of the French Cultural Center in Skopje in 1974, and is based on the Cooperation Agreement in the Field of Culture, Education, Science and Technology (1998) and the Cooperation Agreement between the Ministries of Culture (2010); in the field of education and science through numerous scholarships; there is dynamic cooperation in internal affairs, especially after the entry into force of the Cooperation Agreement in the Field of Internal Security (2006); security cooperation is continuous, based on the Security Cooperation Agreement, and an agreement with the European Ministry of Foreign Affairs and the European defense and space company - Airbus Group. In the field of health, the infusion system project in Macedonia has been successfully implemented so far, and cooperation has begun with several university hospitals. There is also dynamic cooperation with the Lower Normandy region, which, according to the work plan for the period 2013-2016 , is focused on the following axes: new information technologies, youth, cultural heritage, cultural policy, agricultural development, tourism and human rights

France has supported both North Macedonia's bid to join the European Union and North Macedonia's accession to NATO.

== Contemporary period ==
=== Cultural exchanges ===
France and North Macedonia are full members of the International Organisation of the Francophonie.

North Macedonia is home to a French Institute and two Alliance Française branches.

=== On the military front ===
The French Ministry of Defence sent an expert mission to North Macedonia and French is being taught to officers of the Macedonian army. Cooperation between the armed forces of the two countries is part of a perspective on the future integration of North Macedonia into the EU and NATO.

Concordia, the EU peacekeeping operation, was carried out with 40% French personnel and France was the largest contributor to Proxima.

=== Economic relations ===
Trade between the two countries remains modest.

== Migration ==
Around 2,300 Macedonians live in France.

== Diplomatic missions ==
- France has an embassy in Skopje.
- North Macedonia has an embassy in Paris.

== See also ==
- Foreign relations of France
- Foreign relations of North Macedonia
- Accession of North Macedonia to the EU
- NATO-EU relations
- Macedonians in France
- France–Yugoslavia relations
