= France–Yugoslavia relations =

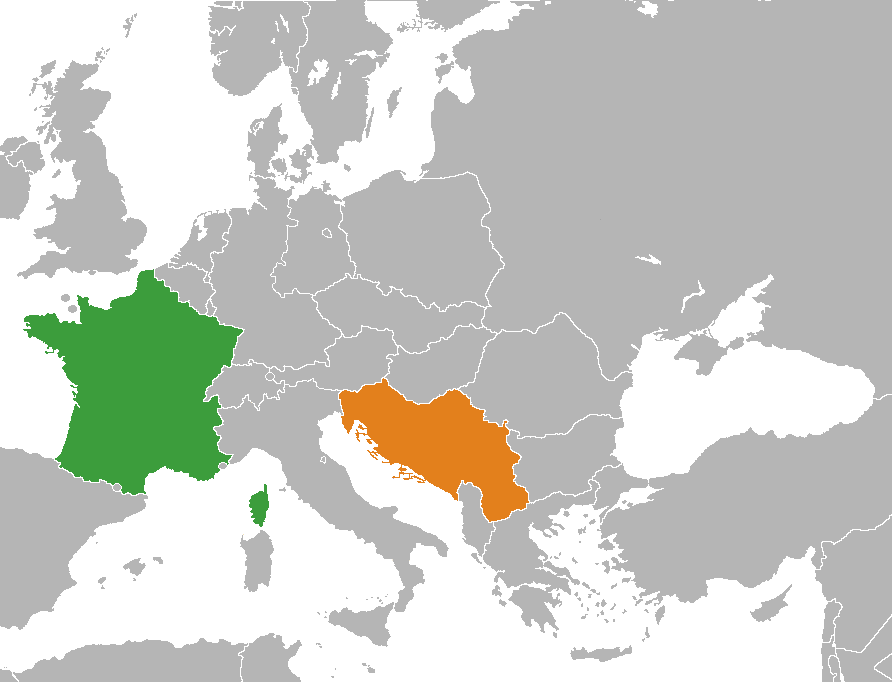

- France: Yugoslavia

France–Yugoslavia relations (French: Relations France-Yougoslavie; Serbo-Croatian: Francusko-jugoslavenski odnosi, Француско-југословенски односи; Slovene: Francosko-jugoslovanski odnosi; Macedonian: Односите Франција-Југославија) were the historical foreign relations between France and Yugoslavia. These spanned from just after the First World War, to the eventual break-up of Yugoslavia in the aftermath of the Cold War. Over this period, there were several successive governments in both countries. France was variously: the Third Republic, Free France, the wartime Provisional Government, the post-war Fourth Republic, and the modern Fifth Republic. Coterminously, the states governing what is today the former Yugoslavia were: the Kingdom of Yugoslavia, the wartime government in exile, the wartime provisional Democratic Federal Yugoslavia, and the Socialist Federal Republic of Yugoslavia.

During the Second World War, there were additionally the Axis puppets of Vichy France, the Government of National Salvation (Nedic's Serbia), and the Independent State of Croatia (NDH), which governed portions of the respective territories of the three occupied countries.

== Country comparison ==
Common name	France	Yugoslavia
Official name	French Republic	Socialist Federal Republic of Yugoslavia
Coat of arms		
Flag		
Capital	Paris	Belgrade
Largest city	Paris	Belgrade
Population	56,970,155	23,229,846
Government	Unitary semi-presidential republic	Socialist republic
Official languages	French	No official language Serbo-Croatian (de facto state-wide) Slovene (in Slovenia) and Macedonian (in Macedonia)
First leader		Joseph Broz Tito
Last leader		Milan Pančevski
Religion	Catholicism (de facto), state atheism (de jure)	Secular state (de jure), state atheism (de facto)
Alliances	EEC, NATO	Non-Aligned Movement

== History ==
=== Interwar period ===
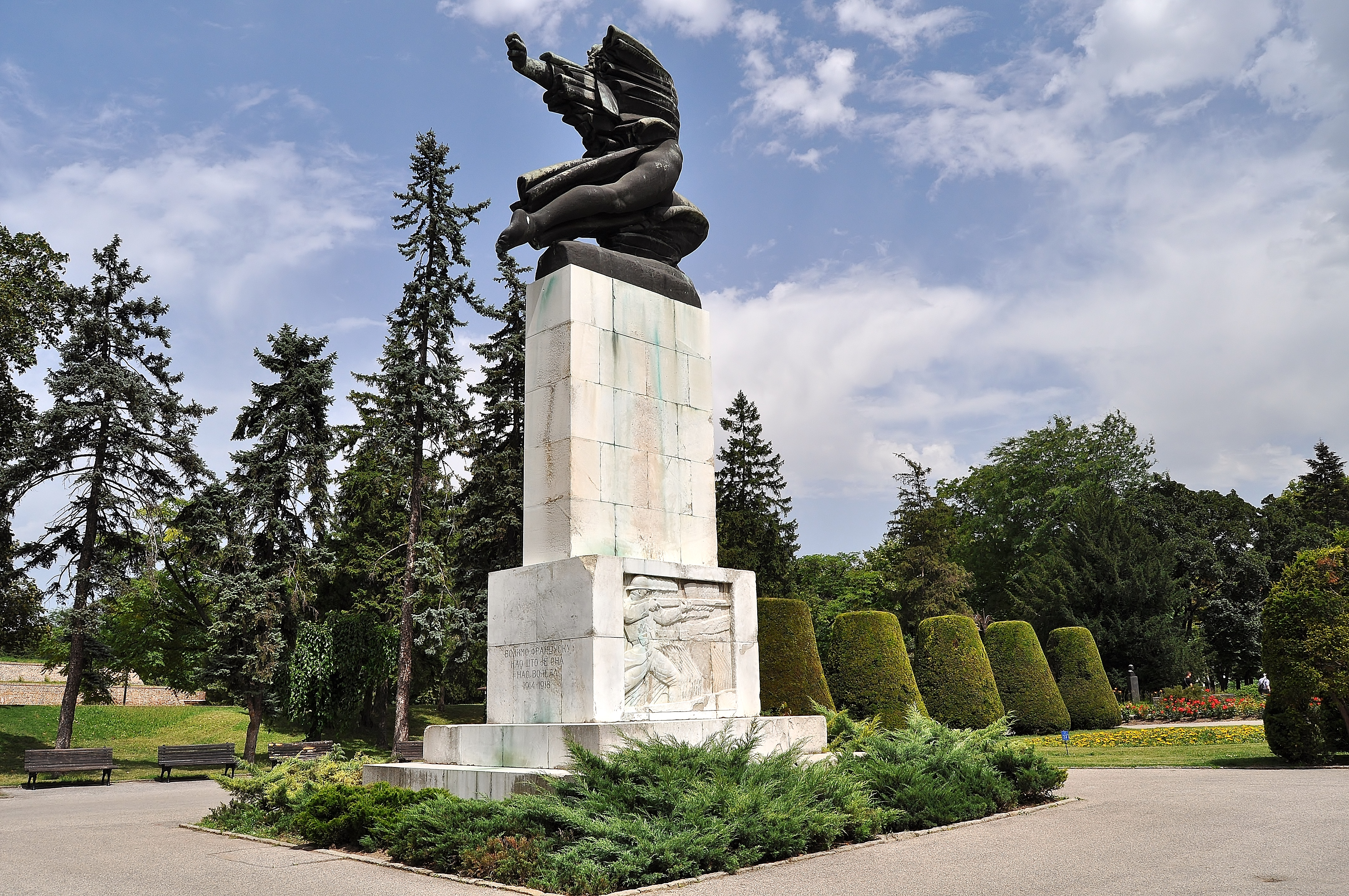
Monument of Gratitude to France at the Belgrade Fortress

Following the earlier experience of the alliance between France and the Kingdom of Serbia, the Kingdom of Yugoslavia was a strong follower of the French political strategies in interbellum central Europe. A declaration of Franco-Yugoslav friendship was signed in Belgrade on 11 November 1927 and was ratified in Paris that same day. In 1928, quoting inopportune timing, the French government rejected a Yugoslav general staff proposal for military cooperation. The French holiday of Bastille Day was celebrated in Yugoslavia, through which Yugoslavs commemorated the French lives lost in the Balkans during the First World War. On 11 November 1930, the Monument of Gratitude to France was opened on the Belgrade Fortress. Economic cooperation was nevertheless limited and decreasing. In 1934 France ranked only sixth among suppliers and eleventh among trade customers of Yugoslavia.

Following the French participation in the Four-Power Pact of 1933, pro-French states such as Yugoslavia became increasingly worried about their reliance on France, and began strengthening their own security arrangements. Consequently, Greece, Romania, Turkey, and Yugoslavia signed the Balkan Pact on February 9, 1934.

On 9 October 1934, Yugoslav king Alexander I and French foreign minister Louis Barthou were assassinated in Marseilles during the former's state visit to France.

Yugoslav policy in the following period reoriented itself towards rapprochement with Bulgaria, Hungary, Fascist Italy, and Nazi Germany.

=== World War II ===
During World War II, both countries came under Axis occupation. Parts of their territories were ruled by Axis powers directly, while other territories were given over to nominally-independent puppet regimes: Vichy France and the Independent State of Croatia (NDH). These regimes conducted limited diplomacy with one another: the NDH maintained a consulate in Vichy France.

Both countries had prominent resistance movements against the occupiers. In the later stages of the war, Yugoslav partisans wrested significant swathes of territory from Axis control. Partisans in Slovene territory rescued hundreds of Allied airmen, prisoners of war, and slave labourers, among whom 120 were French.

=== Socialist Yugoslavia ===
The Socialist Federal Republic of Yugoslavia established itself in the aftermath of the war. Yugoslavia was one of only two postwar socialist states in Europe to retain diplomatic independence from the Soviet Union (the other being Albania). This was a period in which Belgrade intended to use its relations with France to maintain this independence. In April 1946, a Franco-Yugoslav friendship society was created. Further policy disagreements with the Soviet Union led to the 1948 Tito–Stalin split, after which Yugoslav relations with all Eastern Bloc countries were either suspended or significantly strained. Meanwhile, Yugoslavia reoriented its policy towards neutral European countries, and cooperated closely with Non-Aligned countries elsewhere in the world. In the period from 1951 to 1954, France, together with the United States and the United Kingdom, participated in the Tripartite Aid programme for Yugoslavia. However, in 1953 France's National Assembly ended its participation in the program, leading to a diminution of its influence in Yugoslavia.

During the Algerian War, Yugoslavia provided significant logistical and diplomatic support to the Algerian side which badly affected its relations with France. France believed that the close link between Egypt and Yugoslavia would continue to strongly influence the latter's policy towards Algeria. Yugoslavia officially recognized the independence of Algeria on 5 September 1961, making it the first country in Europe to do so. Relations started to improve once again after 1966, and in 1969 Tito even invited France to attend the Non-Aligned Conference. Despite disagreements over Algeria, France recognized the mediator role which non-aligned Yugoslavia (a country with no colonial past) could play between France and the newly independent Francophone African countries. In June 1970, the two nations established a Franco-Yugoslav Chamber of Commerce in Paris.

=== Breakup of Yugoslavia ===
During the early 90s crisis, France initially favoured the preservation of a unified Yugoslav state, in contrast to Germany, which promptly recognized the new states of Slovenia and Croatia. Contemporary commentators interpreted President François Mitterrand's approach as being based upon a fear of a resurgent reunified Germany, and the memory of the historical friendship with Serbia. French diplomacy nevertheless stressed the primacy of a unified common European approach in order not to threaten the Maastricht Treaty nor the national referendum on its passing in September 1992, and was therefore willing to follow the German insistence on Croatian and Slovenian independence.

As Yugoslavia continued to violently disintegrate, France committed peacekeeping forces under United Nations auspices. The French contribution peaked at 6,500 troops, mainly around Sarajevo. They predominantly fought Serb troops, many of whom owed allegiance to the Yugoslav rump state. As a NATO member, France later took part in the coalition's intervention in Bosnia and Herzegovina, and its subsequent bombing campaign against the FR Yugoslavia.

== See also ==
- Foreign relations of France
- Foreign relations of Yugoslavia
- Yugoslavia–European Communities relations
- Bosnia and Herzegovina–France relations
- Croatia–France relations
- France–Kosovo relations
- France–Montenegro relations
- France–North Macedonia relations
- France–Serbia relations
- France–Slovenia relations
