= Embassy of Serbia, Paris =

Serbia's diplomatic mission to France

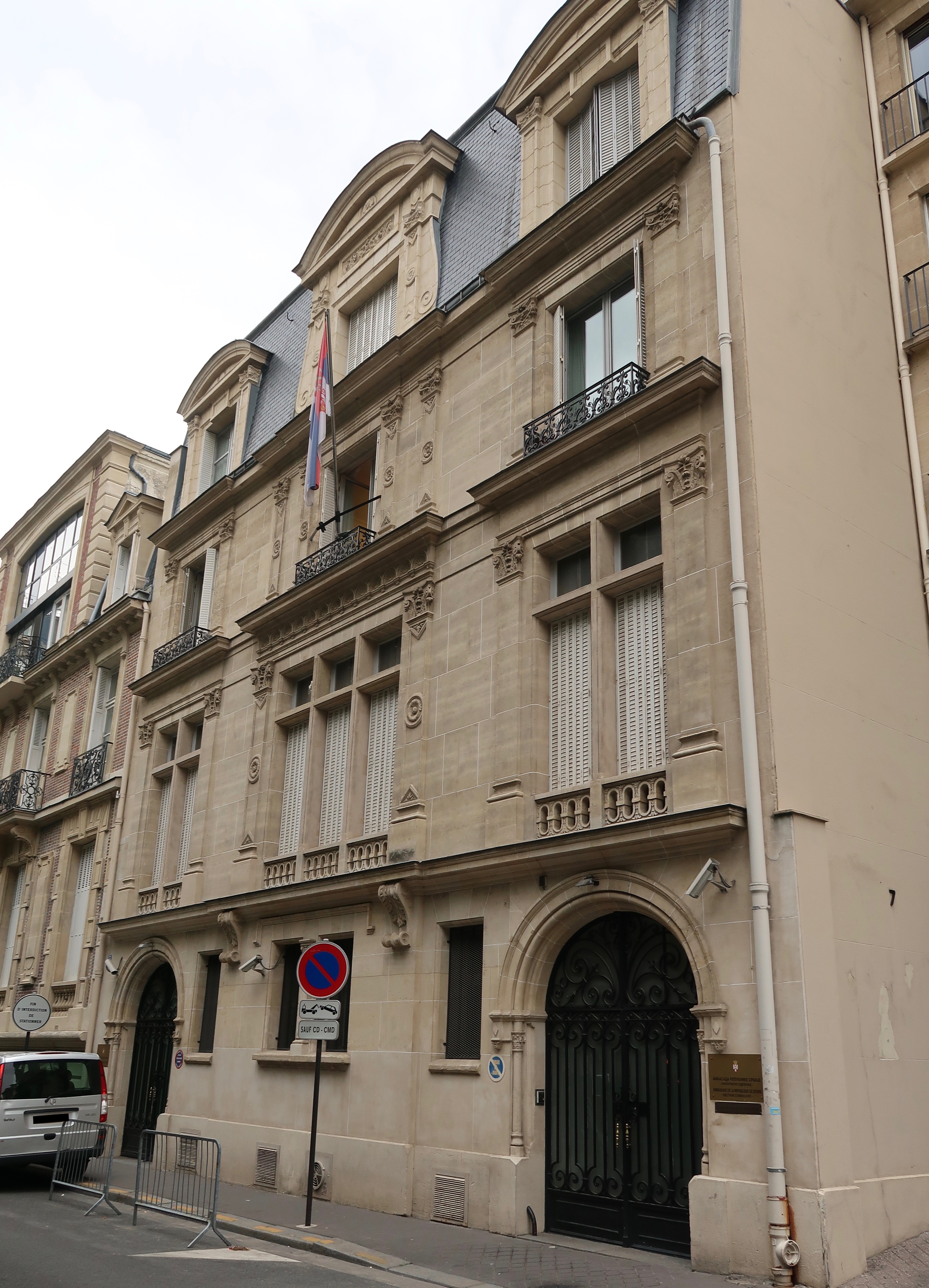
- Location: Paris, France
- Address: Rue Leonard de Vinci 5
- Coordinates: 48°52′19″N 2°17′14″E
- Ambassador: Ana Hrustanović

The Embassy of Serbia in Paris (French: Ambassade de Serbie à Paris, Serbian: Амбасада Србије у Паризу) is diplomatic mission of Serbia to France. It is located at Rue Leonard de Vinci 5, in 16th arrondissement of Paris. The current ambassador is Ana Hrustanović.

== Consulates ==
There is also a consulate general in Strasbourg. Serbia also maintains Permanent Mission to the Council of Europe in Strasbourg and Permanent Mission to the UNESCO in Paris.

In Paris there is also a Cultural Centre of Serbia at 123, Rue St Martin.

== Gallery ==
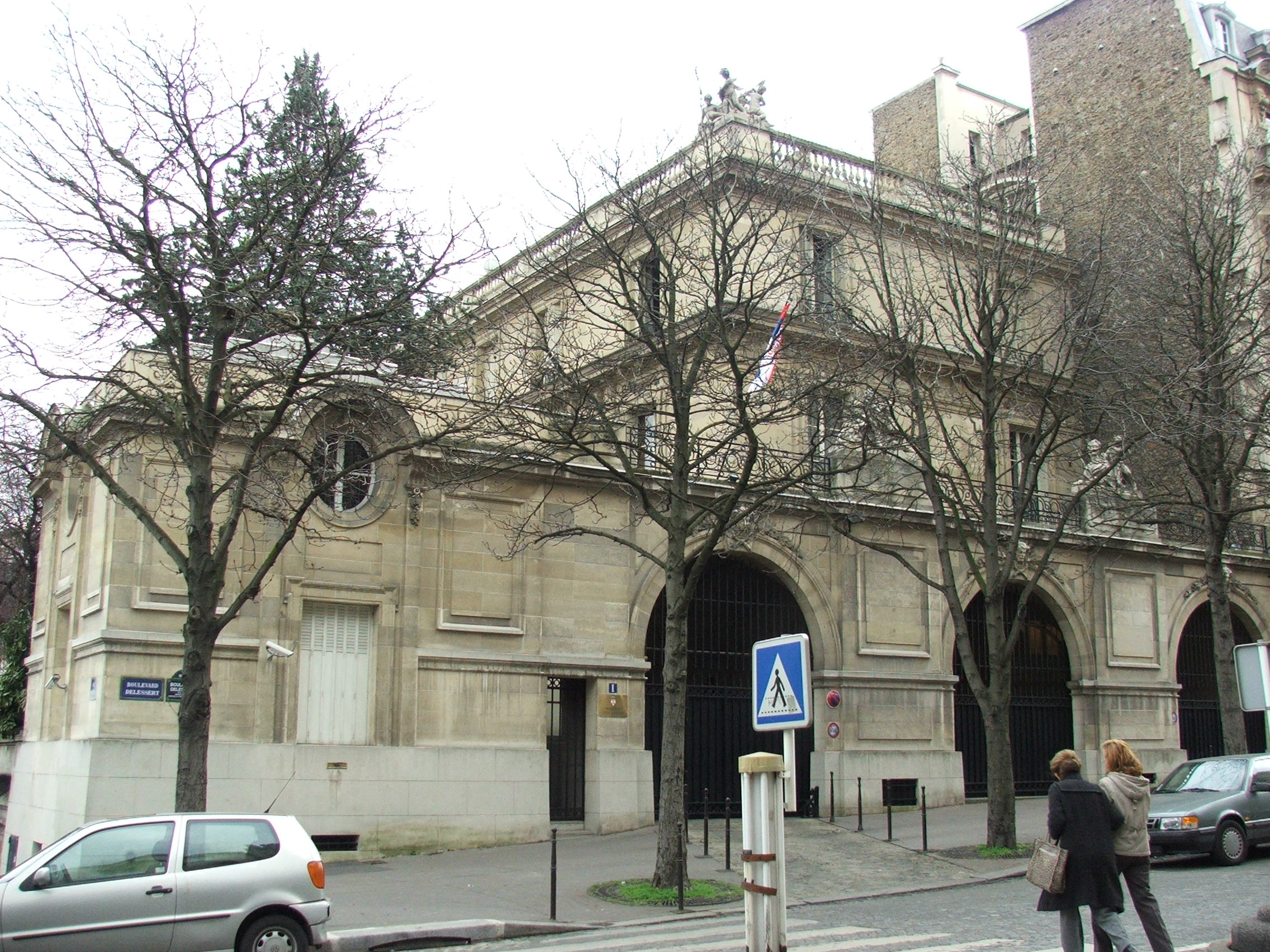
Hotel La Tremoille, the residence of the Serbian Ambassador in Paris

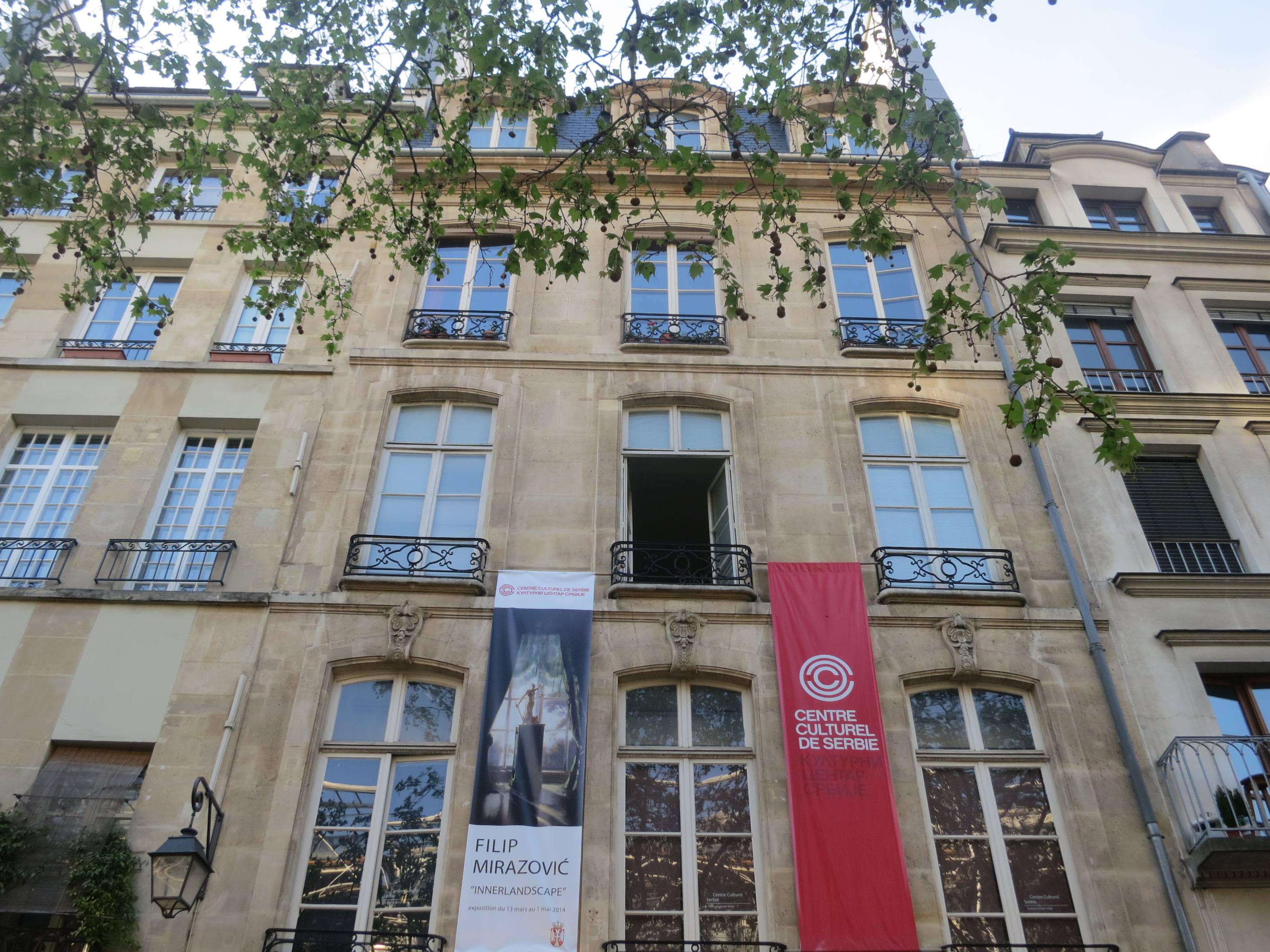
Serbian Cultural Center in Paris

== See also ==
- France–Serbia relations
- Foreign relations of Serbia
