= France–Serbia relations =

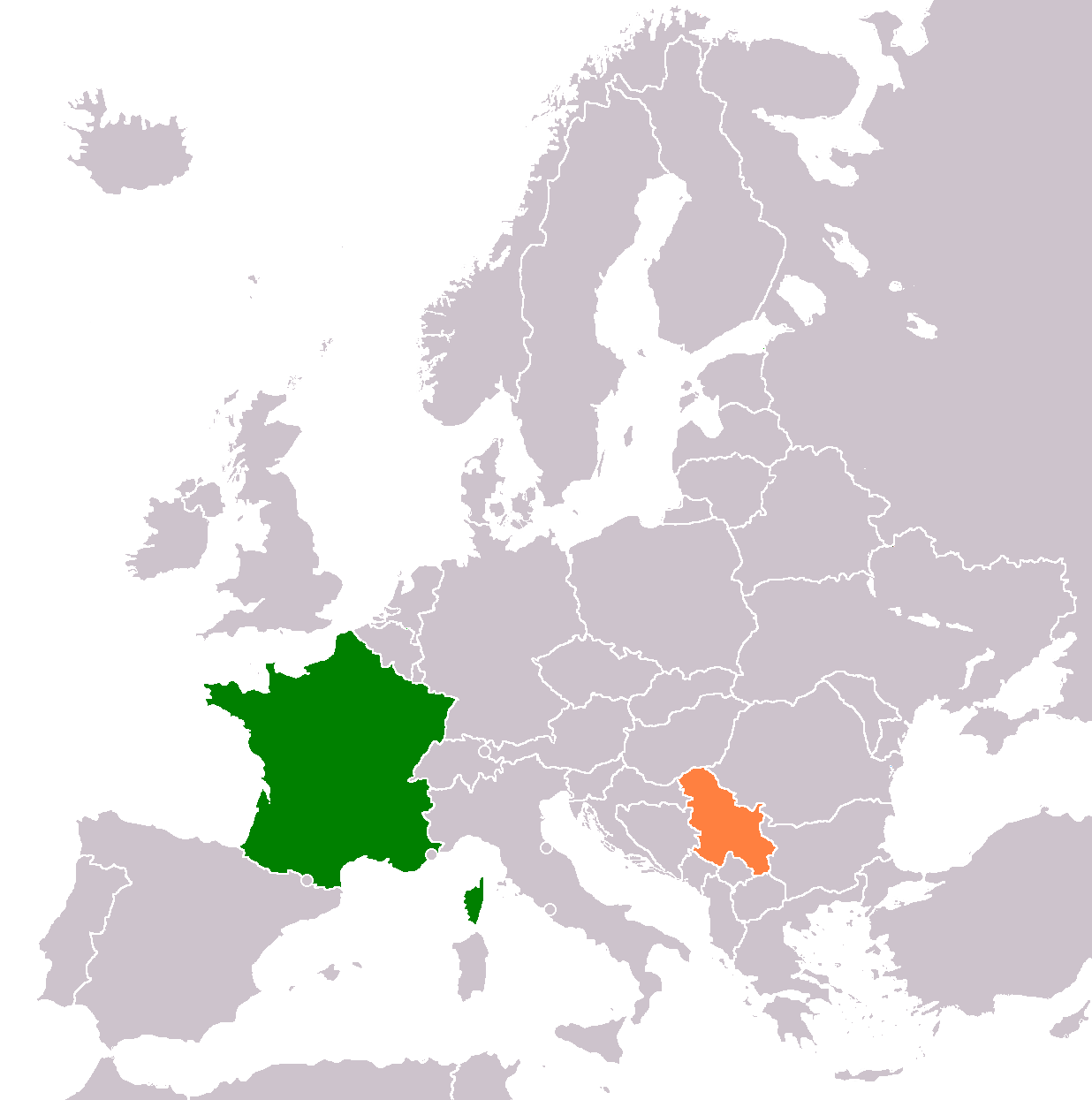
- France: Serbia

France and Serbia maintain diplomatic relations established in 1839. From 1918 to 2006, France maintained relations with the Kingdom of Yugoslavia, the Socialist Federal Republic of Yugoslavia (SFRY), and the Federal Republic of Yugoslavia (FRY) (later Serbia and Montenegro), of which Serbia is considered shared (SFRY) or sole (FRY) legal successor.

== History ==
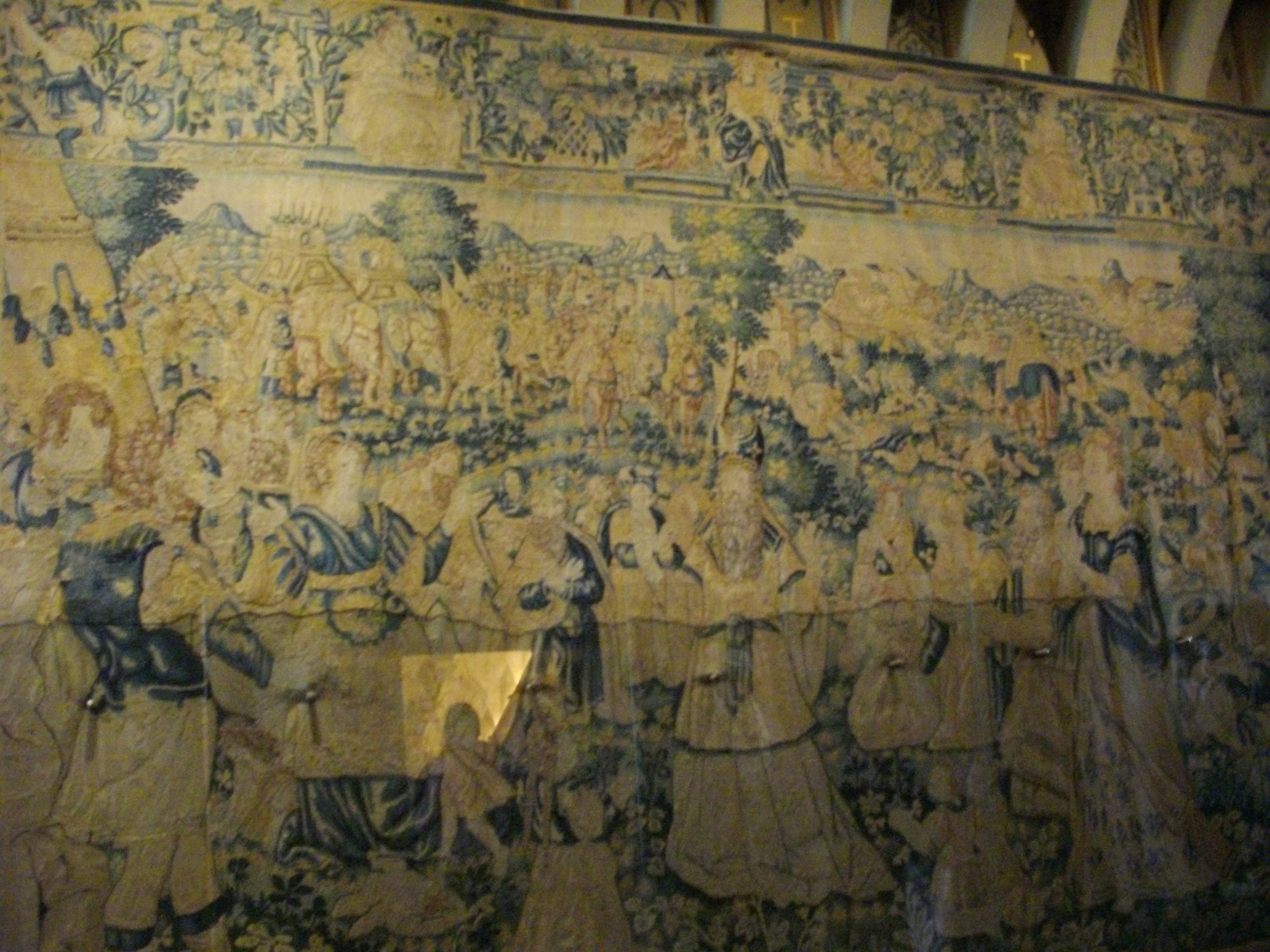
Renaissance tapestry with motifs of the Battle of Kosovo in the Château de Chenonceau

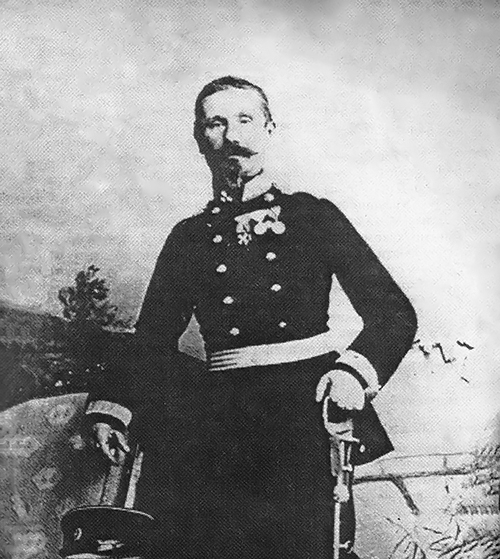
Hyppolyte Mondain, the first Minister of Defence of Serbia

The oldest documented contact between the two sides was the marriage of Stephen Uroš I of Serbia and Helen of Anjou. The first important contacts of French and Serbs came only in the 19th century when French travel writers first wrote about Serbia. In the 19th century, Karađorđe Petrović, leader of Serbian Revolution, sent a letter to Napoleon expressing his admiration, while in the French parliament, Victor Hugo made a speech asking France to assist Serbia and to protect the Serbian population from Ottoman crimes. Rapid development of bilateral relations followed, so that the people in Serbia saw a great new friend in "mighty France", that could protect them from the Ottomans and Habsburgs.

The members of four generations of the national elite known as 'Parisians' played an important role in the political life of modern Serbia. Liberals, Progressives, Radicals and Independent Radicals pursued and shaped modern political principles and values in 19th century Serbia. Implementing and creatively adapting French models and doctrines, and the 'Parisians' contributed to the democratization and Europeanization of Serbia and the eminent place the French influence had in her politics and culture before the WWI. French was the second language in schools during the whole interwar period, and it was studied as the second language in Kingdom of Serbia. Also, a number of notable Serb painters were educated and worked in France, mostly Paris. French influence was visible in the literary production which drew on French models. This influence was explained with "strong spiritual similarity between the French and Serbian mentalities and the French and Serbian languages" and it had a fundamental role in creation of the "Belgrade style".

Relations between two countries continued to improve until the World War I, when the "common struggle" against a common enemy reached its peak. Before the war France won the sympathy of the Serbian population by building railways, opening French schools, a Consulate and a French Bank. Several Serbian kings from this period studied at universities in Paris, as well as large part of the future diplomats. Serbs gained a sense of Francophilia because all these activities moved them away from the Ottoman and Habsburg empires. The Serbian-French alliance until 1914 even threatened the traditional inclination towards Russia. Great humanitarian and military assistance was sent by France to Serbia during the World War I, including assistance in the evacuation of children, civilians and military at the end of the war, and the support of French newspaper headlines. Even today, actions and alliance from the WWI remain deeply ingrained in the collective consciousness of a large number of Serbs.

In the interwar period, rivaling German political influence became less relevant, and France became the primary influence in Kingdom of Yugoslavia and French culture was favored by Serb elites. Some French travelers wrote in the Interwar period that "Serbia is the most Francophile country in the world".

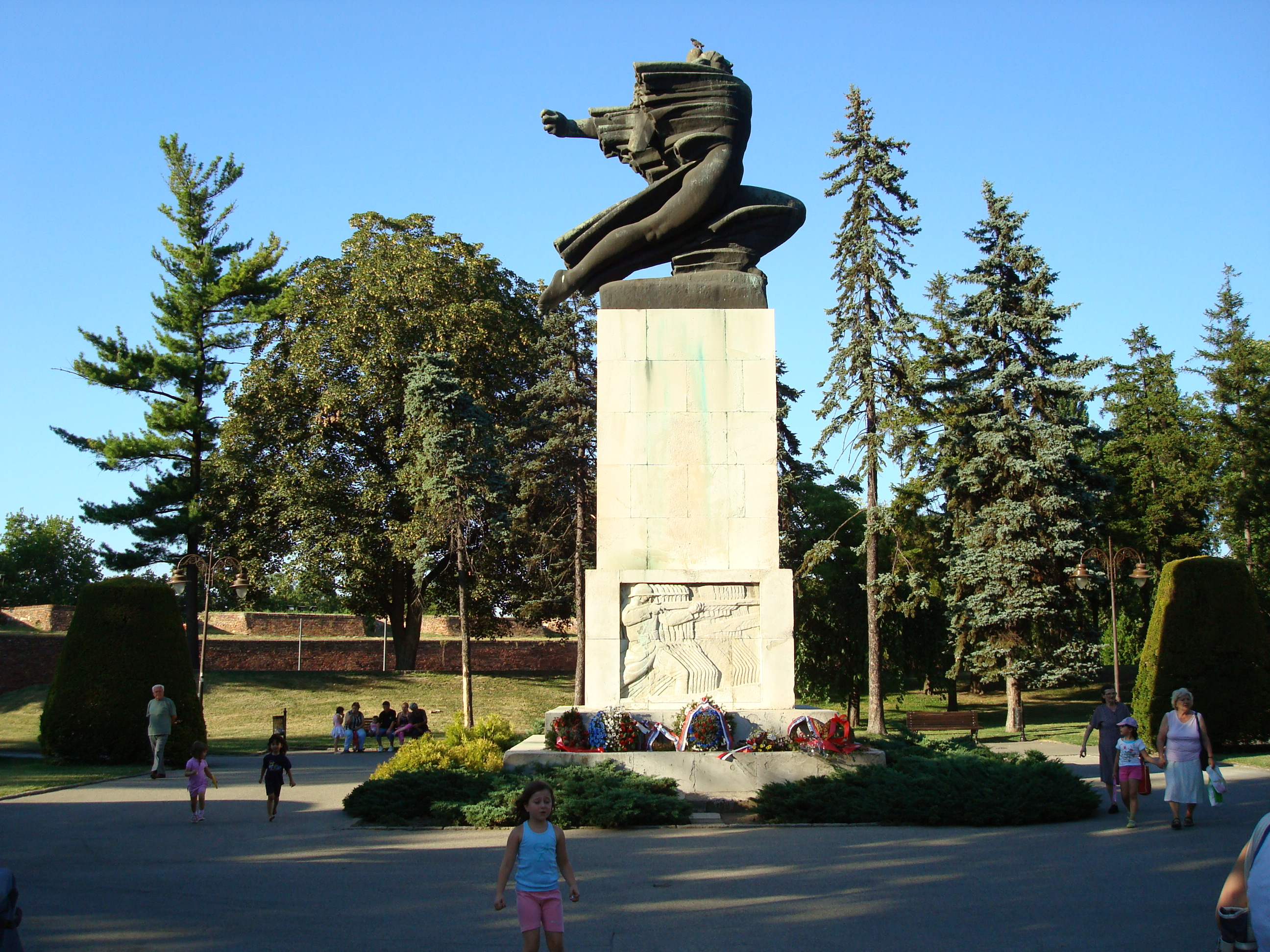
Monument of Gratitude to France in Belgrade's central Kalemegdan Park

In 1964 Socialist Federal Republic of Yugoslavia and France signed six-year bilateral trade agreement which provided Yugoslavia with the same trading conditions France was providing for the OECD member countries contributing to further development of Yugoslav relations with the European Economic Community.

France participated in the 1999 NATO bombing of Yugoslavia, which resulted in a UN administration of Kosovo and then to eventual independence in which Serbia does not recognise. When Kosovo declared its independence from Serbia in 2008, France became one of the first countries to recognize its independence. A leaked diplomatic cable suggested that France had made it clear that Serbia could not enter the EU without recognizing Kosovo's independence.

== Political relations ==
Emmanuel Macron visited Serbia twice during his presidency, in 2019 and 2024. Last French president that visited Serbia before that was Jacques Chirac in 2001.

== Economic relations ==
Trade between two countries reached almost $2 billion in 2023; France's merchandise exports to Serbia were about $1.1 billion; Serbian exports were standing at roughly $833 million.

France is one of a leading foreign investors in Serbia with some 130 French companies employing approximately 13,000 people.

French companies invested largely in the construction sector and infrastructure in Serbia. The busiest airport in the country, Belgrade Nikola Tesla Airport, is operated by Vinci Airports (subsidiary of the conglomerate Vinci) which recently completed the expansion of the airport (expanding terminal building and building a second runway). The City of Belgrade, signed the 25-year private-public partnership in 2017 with Veolia for operating city's waste management facilities at its Vinča site: company recently completed construction of a modern sanitary landfill (with annual capacity of 170,000 tons) and 103 MW waste-to-energy combined heat and power facility (with annual capacity of 340,000 tons) generating electricity for approximately 30,000 households and heat for 10% of Belgrade’s households. Alstom, a rail-stock manufacturer, plays a significant role in the Belgrade Metro project, being responsible for supplying driverless metro trains, digital train control systems, platform screen doors, track laying, power supply solutions, and overall transport system integration for lines 1 and 2 of metro.

French manufacturing companies present in Serbia include Michelin (Tigar Tyres tyre plant in Pirot), Tarkett (floor coverings plant in Bačka Palanka), Saint-Gobain (building materials plants in Apatin, Topola and Novi Sad), Hutchinson (rubber plant in Ruma), Lesaffre (yeast manufacturing plant in Senta) as well as dairy products companies such as Lactalis (plant in Sombor) and Savencia (plants in Zrenjanin and Kikinda).

French sporting goods retail chain Decathlon operates 6 stores in Serbia.

== Military cooperation ==
In recent years, Serbia procured significant amount of French defense industry products. Purchase of 12 new Rafale multirole fighter aircraft (due to be delivered by 2029) from Dassault Aviation, a deal estimated at $3.2 billion, was announced in 2024. There were also acquisitions from Thales (GM400 and GM200 long- and medium-range radar systems) as well as from MBDA (surface-to-air Mistral missiles).

== Cultural cooperation ==
The first French cultural association in Belgrade was founded in 1920 under the name "Society of Friends of France" or "French Club". The World War II and the occupation brought an end to this cooperation. In 1945, a reading room was opened, as a forerunner of the "French Cultural Center", which was founded in 1951 and rebranded as the Institut Francais in 2011.

Since 2006, Serbia is an observer on the Francophonie.

There is a Serbian Cultural Center in Paris, right across the square from the Centre Pompidou.

Belgrade has received the Legion of Honour in 1920, being one of only four cities outside France (alongside Liège, Luxembourg and Volgograd), to receive this honour.

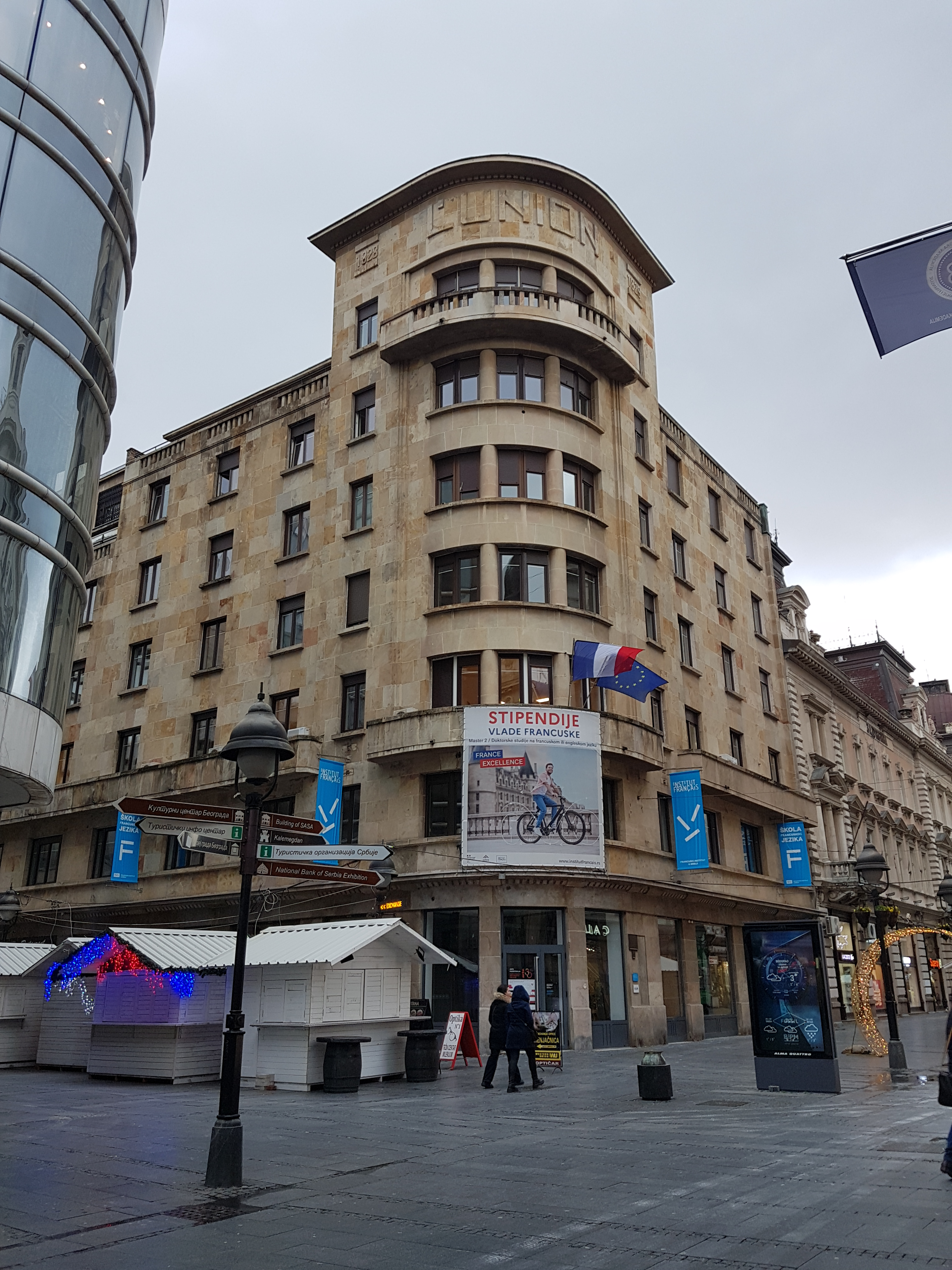
Institut Francais in Belgrade

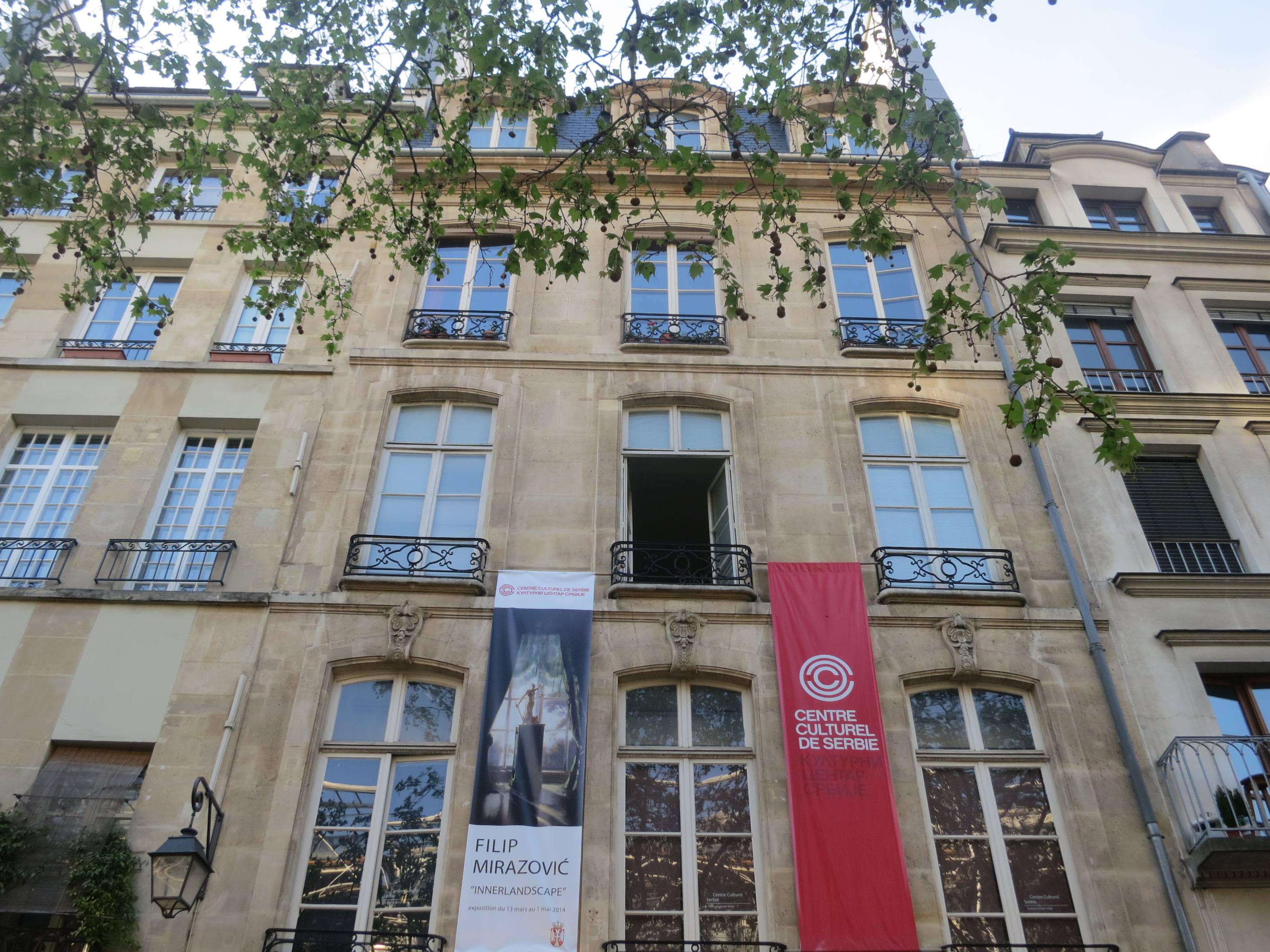
Serbian Cultural Center in Paris

== Immigration from Serbia ==
According to data from 2023, there were 74,000 Serbia-born people living in France, while estimated number of people of Serb ethnic descent (including French citizens with full or partial Serb ethnic descent) stands at around 120,000.

== Resident diplomatic missions ==
- France has an embassy in Belgrade.
- Serbia has an embassy in Paris and a consulate general in Strasbourg.
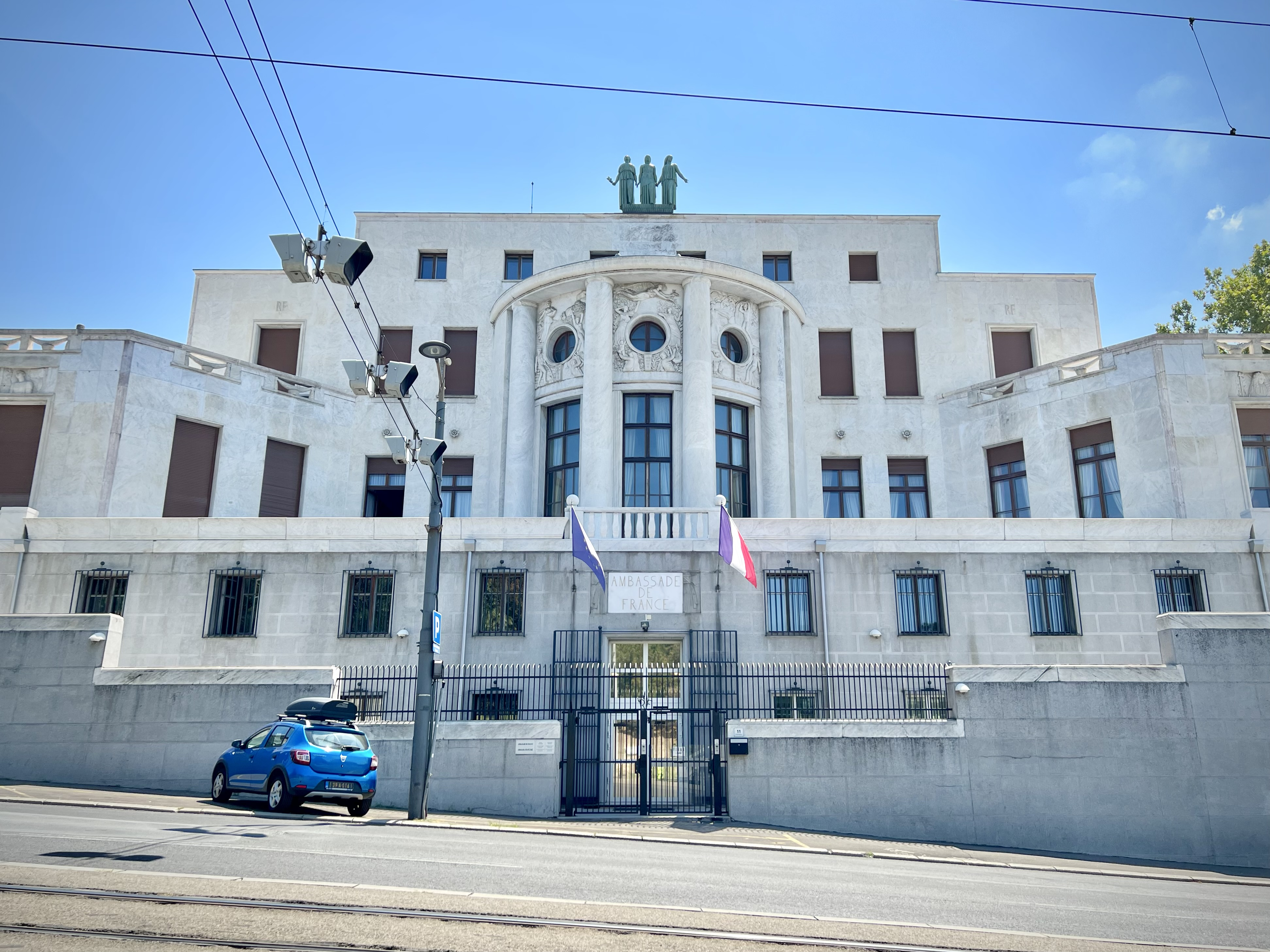
Embassy of France in Belgrade

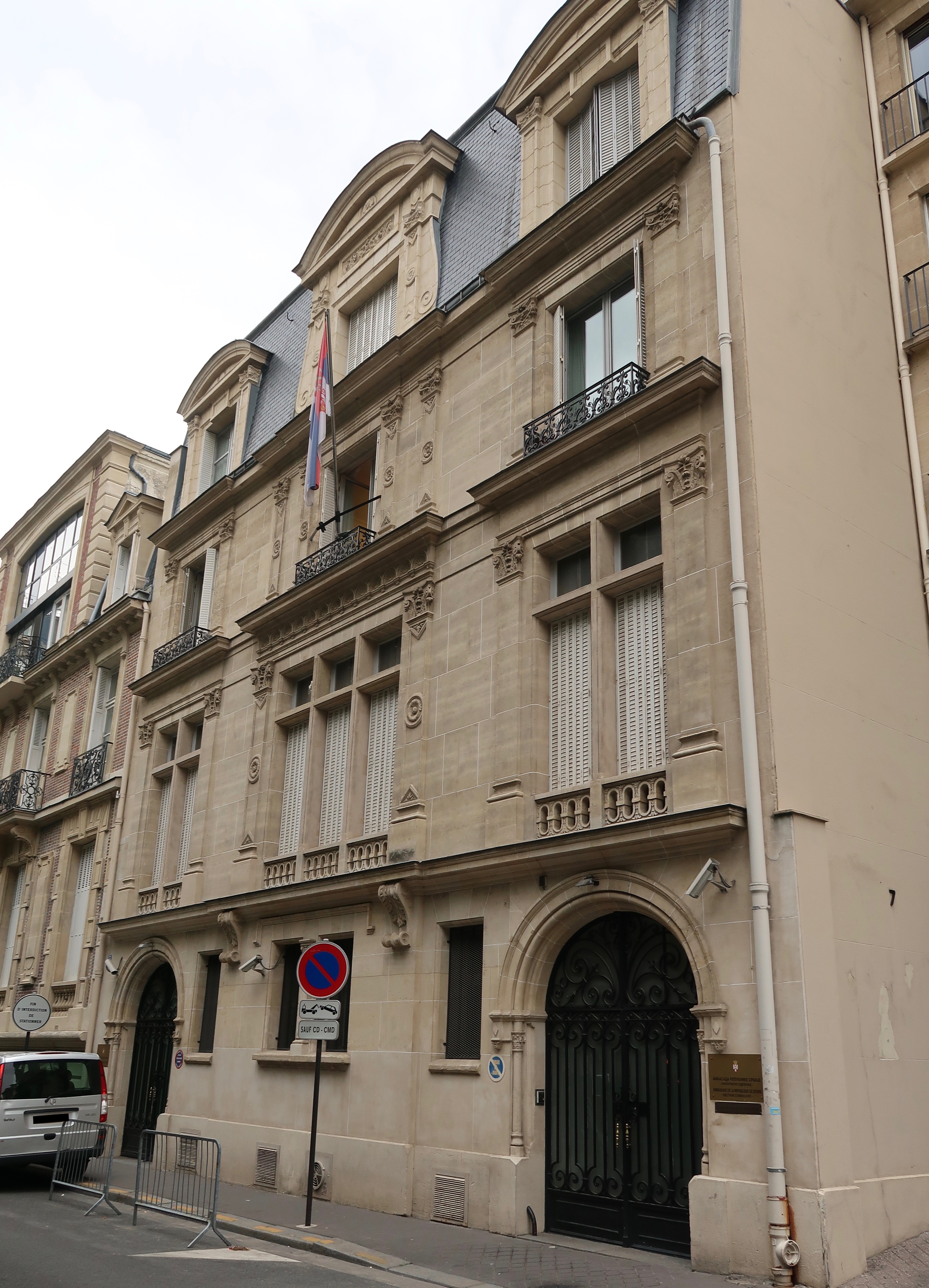
Embassy of Serbia in Paris

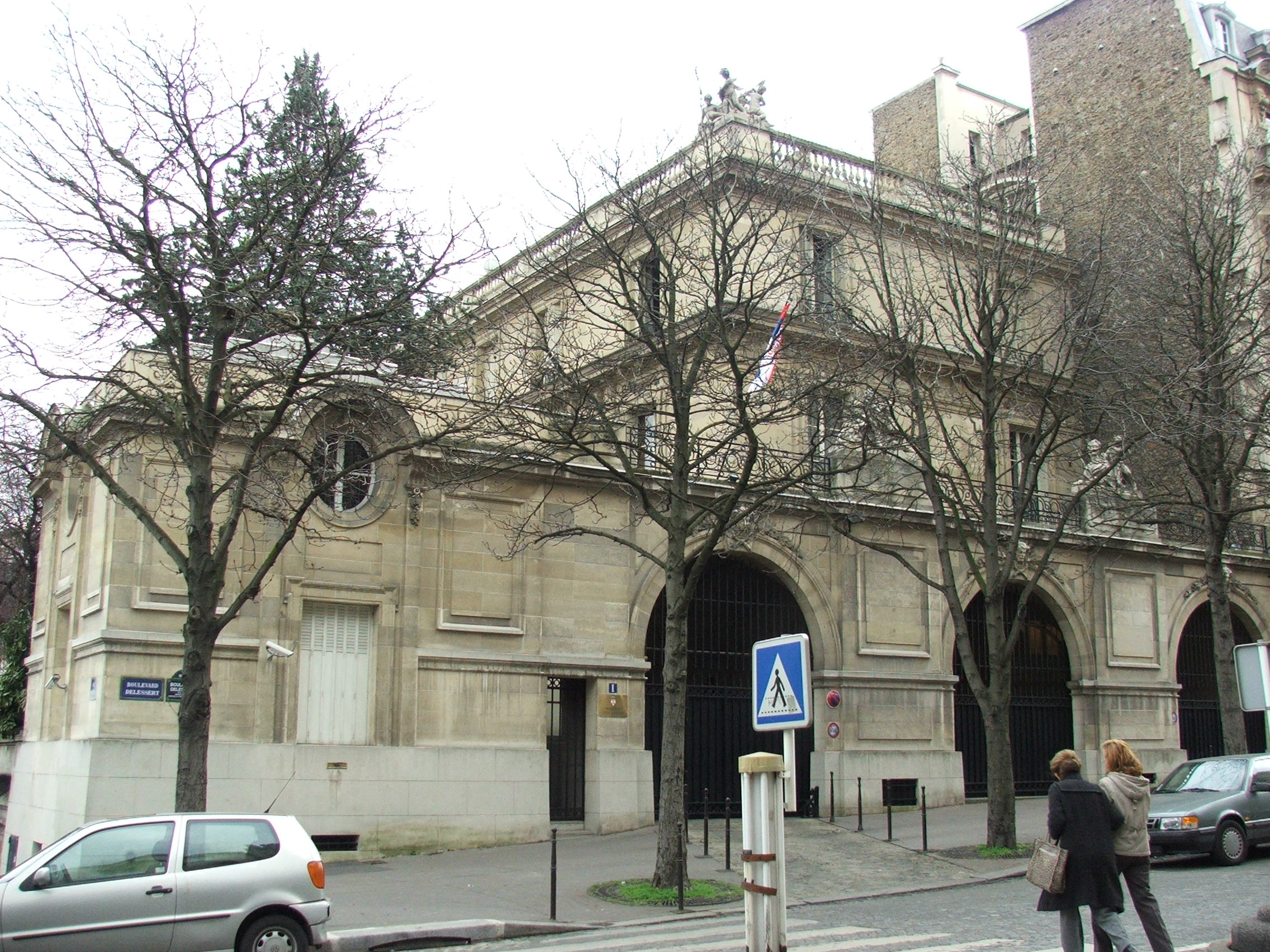
Hotel La Tremoille, the residence of the Serbian Ambassador in Paris

== See also ==
- Foreign relations of France
- Foreign relations of Serbia
- France–Yugoslavia relations

== Sources ==
- Sretenović, S. (2009). "Francusko-srpski odnosi u XIX i XX veku". Međunarodni problemi. 61.
- Troude, Alexis (2019). La France et la Serbie: des siècles d'amitié. Zavod za proučavanje kulturnog razvitka.
