= Jouni Lehtimäki =

Finnish lawyer and politician (born 1964)

Member of Parliament for Satakunta
- In office 24 March 1999 – 18 March 2003

Personal details
- Born: 6 November 1964 (age 61) Pori, Finland
- Party: National Coalition Party
- Education: Licentiate of Laws
- Profession: Jurist, Lawyer
- Military career
- Rank: Major

Jouni Vesa Johannes Lehtimäki (born 6 November 1964 in Pori) is a Finnish jurist, Master of Laws with court training (varatuomari), and a former politician. He served as a Member of Parliament for the National Coalition Party from 1999 to 2003.

In the reserve, Lehtimäki holds the rank of Major.

== Education and career ==
Lehtimäki graduated as a Master of Laws (OTK) in 1991 and completed court training from 1991 to 1992, obtaining the honorary title of varatuomari (Master of Laws with court training) in 1992. He completed a Licentiate of Laws degree at the University of Turku in December 2009. His licentiate thesis discussed the rules of engagement regarding a peacekeeper's right to use force in military crisis management operations.

During his career, Lehtimäki has worked as a rural police chief and a prosecutor. Currently, he is a partner and lawyer at the law firm AC Law (Appeals & Cases). He is a Licensed Legal Counsel (lupalakimies) specializing in litigation, criminal cases, as well as family and inheritance law.

== Political activity ==
Lehtimäki was elected to Parliament from the Satakunta constituency in the 1999 elections. During his term as an MP, he served as a member of the Constitutional Law Committee and the Employment and Equality Committee, where he also served as Vice-Chair. Additionally, he was a deputy member of the Commerce Committee.

In municipal politics, Lehtimäki served as a member of the Pori City Council from 1989–2000 and 2005–2007. He was a member of the City Board from 1993–1994 and in 1999. Lehtimäki resigned from his positions of trust in late 2007 to focus on international duties. He was a candidate in the 2023 parliamentary elections.

== International career ==
Lehtimäki has had a long career in international military and civilian crisis management duties in EU, NATO, and UN operations.

=== Military crisis management and rapid reaction forces ===
Lehtimäki served as a Military Legal Advisor in the UN UNIFIL II operation in Lebanon in 2007, and in the EU EUFOR Althea operation in Bosnia and Herzegovina from 2008 to 2009. In 2009, he served as a Political Advisor (POLAD) for the NATO KFOR operation in Kosovo. From 2012 to 2013, he worked as the Lead Legal Counsel for the NATO Rule of Law Field Support Mission in Afghanistan (ISAF).

Lehtimäki has served twice in the European Union's rapid reaction forces:

- Nordic Battlegroup 2008 (NBG08): He served as the Legal Advisor for the battlegroup starting from the stand-up phase (2007–2008). The duty station was Säkylä.
- Nordic Battlegroup 2011 (NBG11): Lehtimäki served as the Legal Advisor for the coastal jaeger and naval-focused detachment from 2010 to 2011 at the Nyland Brigade in Raseborg. During the same period, he worked as a researcher at the Finnish Defence Forces International Centre (FINCENT).

=== Civilian crisis management and rule of law development ===
In civilian crisis management, Lehtimäki has held high-level advisory positions.

Kosovo has been one of his key areas of operation. From 2013 to 2014, he served as a Legal Officer in the EU Rule of Law Mission in Kosovo (EULEX). Following this, from 2014 to 2017, he worked in the Office of the European Union Special Representative (EUSR) as the International Legal Advisor to the Minister of Justice of Kosovo.

From 2020 to 2022, Lehtimäki served in Ukraine with the European Union Advisory Mission Ukraine (EUAM Ukraine). He worked as a Strategic Advisor to the Minister of Justice, stationed in Kyiv and Mariupol.

=== Honorary Consul ===
In November 2016, the Government of Kosovo appointed Lehtimäki as the Honorary Consul of Kosovo to Finland. He held this position until 2023.

== Other activities ==
Lehtimäki participated in the first season of the reality TV show Suomen Robinson (Finnish Survivor) in 2003–2004. He competed in the Tengah tribe.

=== Honors and awards ===
- Golden Medal of Merit (National Coalition Party, 2009)
- Bronze Medal of Merit (Finnish Reserve Officers' Federation, 1996)
- Person of the Year in Pori (Porin Lehti, 1993)
- Silver Medal of Merit (Youth of the National Coalition Party, 1990)
