= European Union Special Representative =

Emissary of the European Union

The European Union Special Representatives (EUSR) are emissaries of the European Union with specific tasks abroad. While the EU's ambassadors are responsible for affairs with a single country, Special Representatives tackle specific issues, conflict areas or regions of countries. They answer directly to the High Representative of the Union for Foreign Affairs and Security Policy, currently Kaja Kallas.

== Current SRs by region ==
=== Europe ===
==== Bosnia and Herzegovina ====
Peter Sørensen took over the position of EUSR in Bosnia and Herzegovina with a mandate from 1 September 2011 until 30 June 2015. His post was de-coupled from the one of High Representative for Bosnia and Herzegovina (which remained in the hands of Valentin Inzko), aiming at fostering the EU pre-accession strategy for Bosnia and Herzegovina. However, in November 2014, Sørensen became Head of the EU Delegation in Geneva, leaving the EUSR BiH post vacant. Lars-Gunnar Wigemark was appointed as the EUSR in Bosnia and Herzegovina from 1 March 2015 until 31 October 2015. His mandate was extended until 30 June 2018 and again until 31 August 2019. Johann Sattler replaced him in 2019, with a mandate from 1 September 2019 to 31 August 2023. His mandate was extended until 31 August 2024. Luigi Soreca is the current Special Representative, serving since 1 September 2024.

==== Kosovo ====
Tomáš Szunyog was appointed as Special Representative in Kosovo on 30 July 2020. His mandate runs from 1 September 2020 until 31 August 2023. His mandate was extended until 31 August 2024.

==== South Caucasus and the Crisis in Georgia ====
Toivo Klaar was appointed Special Representative for the South Caucasus and the crisis in Georgia on 13 November 2017. His mandate was extended until 29 February 2020, and again until 28 February 2021. His mandate was again extended until 28 February 2022, and then again until 31 August 2022, and then again until 31 August 2023. and then until 31 August 2024. Magdalena Grono was appointed Special Representative on 1 November 2024.

==== Belgrade-Pristina Dialogue and other Western Balkan regional issues ====
On 3 April 2020, Miroslav Lajčák was appointed by the EU Council as Special Representative for the Belgrade-Pristina Dialogue and other Western Balkan regional issues. His 12-month mandate includes the tasks to achieve comprehensive normalisation of the relations between Serbia and Kosovo, improve good neighbourly relations and reconciliation between partners in the Western Balkans, helping them overcome the legacy of the past, and contribute to the consistency and effectiveness of EU action in the Western Balkans. His mandate runs from 2 April 2020 until 31 August 2022. His mandate was renewed until 31 August 2024.

=== Asia ===
==== Central Asia ====
Terhi Hakala is the Special Representative for Central Asia. Her mandate is to promote good relations between the EU and central Asian countries and to strengthen stability, cooperation, democracy and respect for human rights in the region. In particular, the EU Special Representative will co-ordinate EU action in central Asia and oversee the implementation of the EU Strategy for central Asia. Her mandate runs from 1 July 2021 to 28 February 2023. Her mandate was extended to 28 February 2025.

==== Gulf ====
On 1 June 2023, Luigi Di Maio, former Italian Minister of Foreign Affairs, was appointed Special Representative of the European Union for the Persian Gulf. His aims will be to further develop a stronger, comprehensive and more strategic EU partnership with the countries in the Gulf region. He will also contribute to the stability and security of the region by engaging and supporting dialogue and long-term regional solutions with individual Gulf partners and relevant regional organisations. His mandate initially run until 28 February 2025, but, in January 2025, Borrell's successor Kaja Kallas confirmed Di Maio as Special Representative for two more years.

==== Middle East ====
Sven Koopmans has been appointed Special Representative for the Middle East peace process. His mandate runs from 1 May 2021 until 28 February 2023. Between 2017 and 2021 "he was a Member of Parliament in the Netherlands, where he was spokesperson on foreign affairs and head of delegation in the NATO Parliamentary Assembly." The mandate of the Special Representative is based on the EU's policy objectives regarding the Middle East peace process, which include a two-State solution with Israel and a democratic, contiguous, viable, peaceful and sovereign Palestinian State living side by side within secure and recognised borders enjoying normal relations with their neighbours in accordance with UN Security Council Resolutions 242, 338, 1397 and 1402 and the principles of the Madrid Conference. His mandate was extended until 28 February 2025.

=== Africa ===
==== Horn of Africa (incl. the region of Sudan) ====
Annette Weber was appointed Special Representative for the Horn of Africa on 1 July 2021. Her mandate runs until 31 August 2022. Her mandate was extended until 31 August 2024.

==== Sahel ====
João Gomes Cravinho was appointed as the Special Representative for the Sahel on 18 November 2024, succeeding Emanuela Claudia Del Re, whose mandate started in June 2021. His inititial mandate will run for 21 months, until 31 August 2026.

=== Global ===
==== Human Rights ====
A long-standing request for a representative that would be in charge of enhancing the effectiveness and visibility of EU's human rights policy, based on the Strategic Framework and Action Plan on Human Rights and Democracy (officially adopted on 25 June 2012), led to the creation of the post of the Special Representative of the European Union for Human Rights. The post, which is providing a strong, independent, flexible and sufficiently broad mandate, is aiming to cover fields such as the strengthening of democracy, International justice, humanitarian law and the abolition of the death penalty.

On 26 February 2024, Olof Skoog was appointed as the European Union Special Representative for human rights, with a mandate from 1 March 2024 until 28 February 2026.

== Previous SRs ==
The table below is based on official sources provided by the EU.

Scope	Representative(s)	Term(s)
Afghanistan	Klaus-Peter Klaiber	10 December 2001 – 30 June 2002
Afghanistan	Francesc Vendrell	1 July 2002 – 31 August 2008
Afghanistan	Ettore Francesco Sequi (also for Pakistan from 15 June 2009)	1 September 2008 – 31 March 2010
Afghanistan	Vygaudas Ušackas	1 April 2010 – 31 August 2013
Afghanistan	Franz-Michael Skjold Mellbin (also EU Ambassador to Afghanistan)	1 September 2013 – 31 August 2017
African Great Lakes Region	Aldo Ajello (initially as Special Envoy)	25 March 1996 – 28 February 2007
African Great Lakes Region	Roeland van de Geer (nl)	1 March 2007 – 31 August 2011
African Union	Koen Vervaeke	6 December 2007 – 31 October 2011
African Union	Gary Quince (remains head of the EU Delegation to the AU)	1 November 2011 – 30 June 2014
Bosnia and Herzegovina	Lord Ashdown (also High Representative)	3 June 2002 – 31 January 2006
Bosnia and Herzegovina	Christian Schwarz-Schilling (also High Representative)	1 February 2006 – 30 June 2007
Bosnia and Herzegovina	Miroslav Lajčák (also High Representative)	1 July 2007 – 28 February 2009
Bosnia and Herzegovina	Valentin Inzko (also High Representative)	1 March 2009 – 31 August 2011
Bosnia and Herzegovina	Peter Sørensen (also EU Ambassador to Bosnia and Herzegovina)	1 September 2011 – 31 October 2014
Bosnia and Herzegovina	Lars-Gunnar Wigemark (also EU Ambassador to Bosnia and Herzegovina)	1 March 2015 – 31 August 2019
Bosnia and Herzegovina	Johann Sattler (also EU Ambassador to Bosnia and Herzegovina)	1 September 2019 – 31 August 2024
Bosnia and Herzegovina	Luigi Soreca (also EU Ambassador to Bosnia and Herzegovina)	1 September 2024 – present
Central Asia	Ján Kubiš	28 July 2005 – 5 July 2006
Central Asia	Pierre Morel	5 October 2006 – 30 June 2012
Central Asia	Patricia Flor	1 July 2012 – 30 June 2014
Central Asia	Peter Burian	15 April 2015 – 30 June 2021
Georgia crisis	Pierre Morel	25 September 2008 – 31 August 2011
Horn of Africa	Alexander Rondos	1 January 2012 – 30 June 2021
Human rights (worldwide)	Stavros Lambrinidis	1 September 2012 – 28 February 2019
Human rights (worldwide)	Eamon Gilmore	1 March 2019 - 29 February 2024
Kosovo	Wolfgang Petritsch (Special Envoy)	5 October 1998 – 29 July 1999
Kosovo	Pieter Feith	4 February 2008 – 30 April 2011
Kosovo	Fernando Gentilini	1 May 2011 – 31 January 2012
Kosovo	Samuel Žbogar	1 February 2012 – 31 August 2016
Kosovo	Nataliya Apostolova	1 September 2016 – 31 August 2020
Republic of Macedonia	François Léotard	29 June 2001 – 29 October 2001
Republic of Macedonia	Alain Le Roy	29 October 2001 – 28 February 2002
Republic of Macedonia	Alexis Brouhns	30 September 2002 – 31 December 2003
Republic of Macedonia	Søren Jessen-Petersen	26 January 2004 – 30 June 2004
Republic of Macedonia	Michael Sahlin	12 July 2004 – 31 August 2005
Republic of Macedonia	Erwan Fouéré	17 October 2005 – 31 August 2011
Middle East peace process	Miguel Ángel Moratinos	25 November 1996 – 31 May 2002
Middle East peace process	Marc Otte	14 July 2003 – 28 February 2011
Middle East peace process	Andreas Reinicke	1 February 2012 – 31 December 2013
Middle East peace process	Fernando Gentilini	15 April 2015 – 30 June 2018
Middle East peace process	Susanna Terstal	18 September 2018 – 30 April 2021
Middle East peace process	Sven Koopmans	1 May 2021 – 28 February 2025
Middle East peace process	Luigi Di Maio	1 March 2025 – 1 June 2025
Moldova	Adriaan Jacobovits de Szeged	23 March 2005 – 28 February 2007
Moldova	Kálmán Mizsei	1 March 2007 – 28 February 2011
Sahel	Michel Reveyrand-de Menthon (fr)	18 March 2013 – 31 October 2015
Sahel	Ángel Losada Fernández (es)	1 November 2015 – 30 June 2021
South Caucasus	Heikki Talvitie	1 July 2003 – 28 February 2006
South Caucasus	Peter Semneby	1 March 2006 – 28 February 2011
South Caucasus	Philippe Lefort (also for Georgia crisis)	1 September 2011 – 30 June 2014
South Caucasus	Herbert Salber (also for Georgia crisis)	1 July 2014 – 15 August 2017
Royaumont Process	Panagiotis Roumeliotis (was already also the coordinator of the process of stability and good-neighbourly relations in Southeast Europe (the Royaumont Process))	31 May 1999 – 31 May 2000
Southern Mediterranean	Bernardino León	18 July 2011 – 30 June 2014
(Special) Coordinator of the Stability Pact for South Eastern Europe	Bodo Hombach	2 July 1999 – 31 December 2001
(Special) Coordinator of the Stability Pact for South Eastern Europe	Erhard Busek	1 January 2002 – 30 June 2008
Sudan	Pekka Haavisto	18 July 2005 – 30 April 2007
Sudan	Torben Brylle	1 May 2007 – 31 August 2010
Sudan	Rosalind Marsden (also for South Sudan since 1 August 2011)	1 September 2010 – 31 October 2013
Federal Republic of Yugoslavia	Felipe González	8 June 1998 – 11 October 1999
