= International Civilian Representative for Kosovo =

International Civilian Office
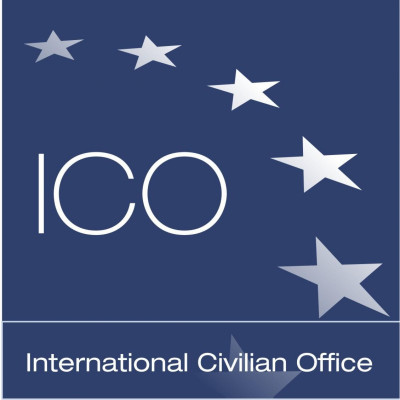
- Successor: EU Special Representative for Kosovo
- Formation: 2008
- Dissolved: 2012
- Headquarters: Pristina, Kosovo
- International Civilian Representative: Pieter Feith (2008-2012)
- Parent organization: International Steering Group for Kosovo

The International Civilian Representative for Kosovo (ICR), supported by the International Civilian Office (ICO), was the European Union Special Representative (EUSR) for Kosovo (appointed by the Council of the European Union) which was re-appointed by the International Steering Group for Kosovo as the ICR pursuant to the Ahtisaari Plan. The ICR was the "final authority in Kosovo regarding interpretation" of the Plan, and could, in principle, annul decisions or laws adopted by Kosovo authorities or sanction public officials who strayed from the Plan. The ICR reported to the International Steering Group for Kosovo (ISG).

Following the publication of the draft status proposal in 2006, an International Civilian Office preparation team has been set up in Pristina. The 2008 Kosovo declaration of independence declared to accept the obligations contained in the Ahtisaari Plan, welcoming its framework.

In September 2012, international supervision ended, and Kosovo became responsible for its own governance.

== Leadership ==
=== Preparation team leaders ===
- Torbjorn Sohlstrom (2006-2007)
- Jonas Jonsson (2007-2008)

=== International Civilian Representative ===
- Pieter Feith (2008-2012)

=== EU Special Representative ===
- Pieter Feith (2008-2011)
- Fernando Gentilini (2011)
- Samuel Žbogar (2012-2017).
- Nataliya Apostolova (2017-)

== See also ==
- Kosovo status process
- European Union Rule of Law Mission in Kosovo (EULEX)
