= International Steering Group for Kosovo =

Political organization based in Kosovo

The International Steering Group for Kosovo (ISG) was an organization formed pursuant to the Ahtisaari Plan concerning the Kosovo status process. Made up of countries that recognized the declaration of independence, it was set up to guide Kosovo's democratic development and promote good governance, multi-ethnicity and the rule of law.

The group was responsible for appointing and overseeing the International Civilian Representative for Kosovo (ICR). The ICR was the "final authority in Kosovo regarding interpretation" of the Plan and had the "ability to annul decisions or laws adopted by Kosovo authorities and sanction and remove public officials whose actions he/she determined to be inconsistent" with the Plan. The European Union Special Representative (EUSR) for Kosovo (appointed by the Council of the European Union) was re-appointed by the ISG as the ICR.

The 2008 Kosovo declaration of independence formally "accept[ed] fully the obligations" of the Ahtisaari Plan. It had its inaugural meeting on Thursday February 28, 2008. The group has been declared "illegal" by Serbia and condemned by Russia.

On 10 September 2012, the International Steering Group had its final meeting and formally ended its supervision,

With immediate effect, the CSP no longer exists as a separate and superior legal power, and the Constitution of the Republic of Kosovo now constitutes the sole basis for the country's legal framework.

and Kosovo became responsible for its own governance.

== Members ==
There are 25 countries which were members of the Steering Group, 15 of which were at its formation with ten others joining later.

The draft Ahtisaari Plan originally defined the ISG as composed of:

- France
- Germany
- Italy
- Russia
- United Kingdom
- United States
- European Union
- European Commission
- NATO

The ISG held that "one of the criteria for becoming member of ISG was recognition [of Kosovo's independence]." The Group was composed of 20 EU member states and five non-EU countries.

- Austria
- Belgium
- Bulgaria
- Croatia (joined 30 June 2008)
- Czech Republic
- Denmark
- Estonia
- Finland
- France
- Germany
- Hungary
- Ireland
- Italy
- Latvia
- Lithuania (joined 30 June 2008)
- Luxembourg
- Netherlands
- Norway (joined 30 June 2008)
- Poland
- Slovenia
- Sweden
- Switzerland
- Turkey
- United Kingdom
- United States

== See also ==
- Kosovo status process
- European Union Rule of Law Mission in Kosovo (EULEX)
- Peace Implementation Council
