= International University in Moscow =

Private university in Russia

Coordinates: 55°46′55″N 37°34′15″E

Moscow International University
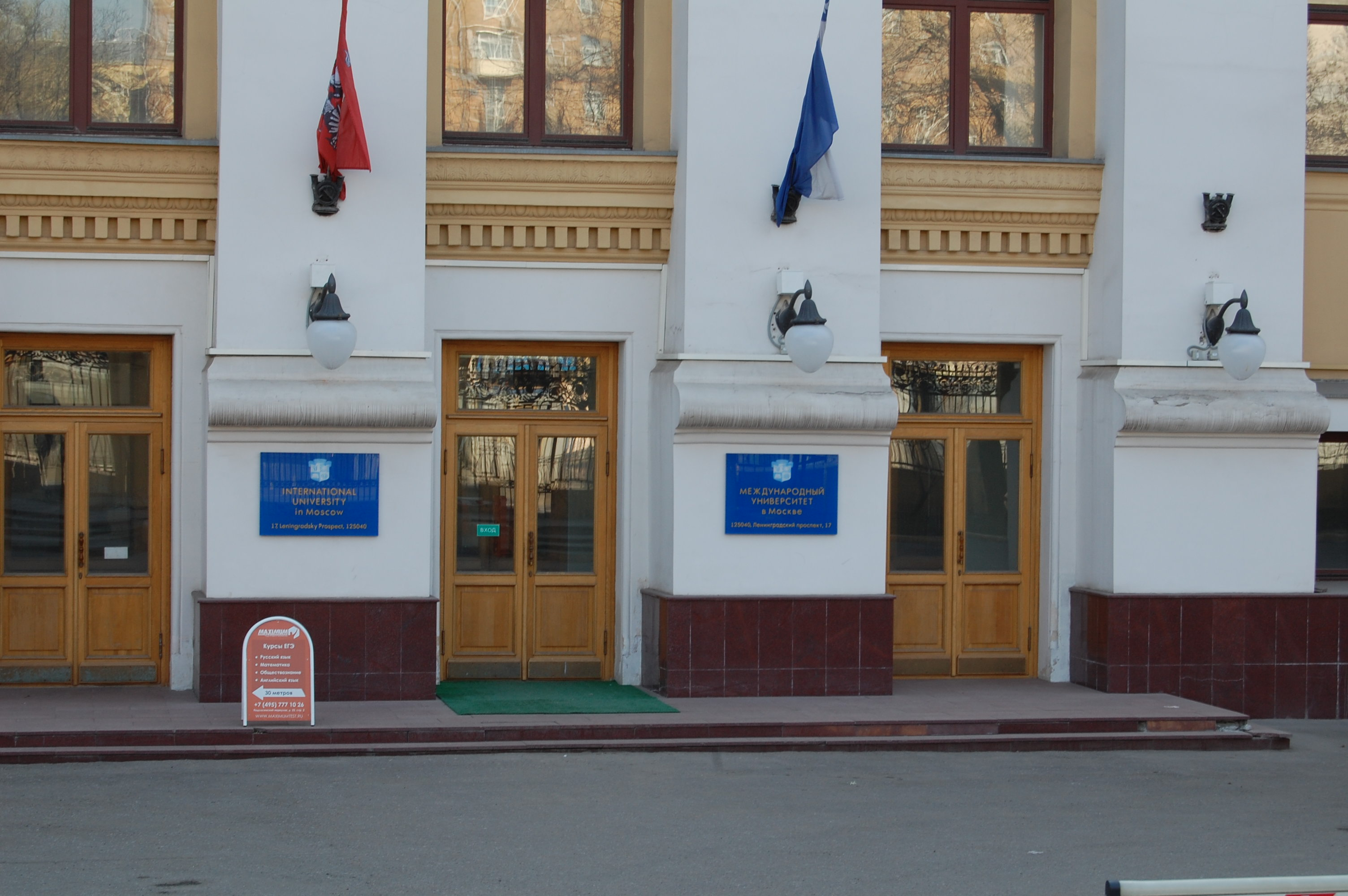
- Motto: Pro Bono Publico
- Type: Private University
- Established: 1991
- President: Gennady Kostrov
- Rector: Lenar Yusunov
- Location: (Russia) Moscow, Russia
- Website: https://mi.university/

The Moscow International University was established in 1991 by Mikhail Gorbachev and George H. W. Bush, and is the first private university in Russia.

In August 1991, President of the USSR Mikhail Gorbachev and President of the U.S. George H. W. Bush launched a joint educational project: a Soviet-American University, which in documents signed later by Boris Yeltsin, the first President of Russia, was named the Moscow International University.

The university's main campus is located at 17 Leningradsky Prospect in central Moscow.

== Faculties ==
The institute has following faculties:

- Faculty of Management
- Faculty of Major Cities
- Faculty of Entrepreneurship in Culture
- Faculty of Foreign Languages
- Faculty of Law
- Faculty of Journalism

== Partners ==
- Washington & Jefferson College (Pennsylvania, United States)
- North Park University (Chicago, United States)
- University of Mississippi (Mississippi, United States)
- University of Western Ontario (Canada)
- Akita International University (Japan)
- Institute of administration and management at the Higher school of Commerce (Paris/Nice, France)
- University of León (León, Spain)
- Zagreb School of Economics and Management (Zagreb, Croatia)

== Honorary doctors ==
- Paul Davenport - the ninth President and Vice-Chancellor of the University of Western Ontario (Canada)
- Mikhail Gorbachev - President of the Soviet Union
- Daisaku Ikeda - President of Soka Gakkai (Japan)
- Kim Hak-Su - Under Secretary of the United Nations Executive Secretary of ESCAP
- Kreg Kohan - first General Director of "Coca-Cola Refreshments Moscow"
- Hermenegildo Lypez Gonzalez - Professor of the University of León (Spain)
- Yuri Luzhkov - the second Mayor of Moscow
- Dennis Meadows - Director of the Institute of Politics and Social Research at University of New Hampshire (United States)
- Victor Meskill - President of Dowling College (United States)
- Kálmán Mizsei - UN Development Programme, Regional Bureau for Europe and the CIS, Director
- Timothy O'Connor - Vice-President of American Councils for International Education; The University of Northern Iowa
- Vyacheslav Trushin - Art director of Chamber Orchestra "Rossijskaya Kamerata"
- Klaus-Heinrich Standke - President of "East-West" Economic Academy (Germany)
- Joan Wheeler - John Davis Foundation (United States), Trustee
