= Mark Sedwill =

British diplomat and civil servant (born 1964)

The Right Honourable The Lord Sedwill GCMG FRGS
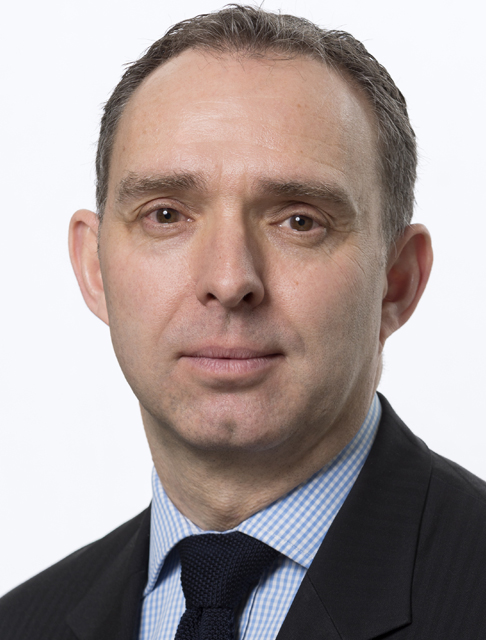
- Sedwill, circa 2013

Cabinet Secretary; Head of the Home Civil Service
- In office 24 October 2018 – 9 September 2020 (Note: Acting: 25 June 2018 – 24 October 2018)
- Prime Minister: Theresa May; Boris Johnson
- Preceded by: Sir Jeremy Heywood
- Succeeded by: Simon Case

United Kingdom National Security Adviser
- In office 13 April 2017 – 16 September 2020
- Prime Minister: Theresa May; Boris Johnson
- Preceded by: Sir Mark Lyall Grant
- Succeeded by: David Quarrey (acting)

Director, Afghanistan & Pakistan of the Foreign and Commonwealth Office
- In office 2010–2012
- Prime Minister: David Cameron
- Preceded by: Karen Pierce
- Succeeded by: Richard Crompton

NATO Senior Civilian Representative in Afghanistan
- In office January 2010 – June 2010
- Prime Minister: Gordon Brown; David Cameron
- Preceded by: Fernando Gentilini
- Succeeded by: Simon Gass

Member of the House of Lords
- Lord Temporal
- Life peerage 11 September 2020

Personal details
- Born: Mark Philip Sedwill; 21 October 1964 (age 62) Ealing, England
- Party: Crossbencher
- Education: University of St Andrews (BSc); St Edmund Hall, Oxford (MPhil)

Mark Philip Sedwill, Baron Sedwill, GCMG FRGS (born 21 October 1964) is a British diplomat and senior civil servant who served as Cabinet Secretary and Head of the Home Civil Service to Prime Ministers Theresa May and Boris Johnson from 2018 to 2020. He also served as the United Kingdom National Security Adviser from 2017 to 2020.

He was previously the United Kingdom's Ambassador to Afghanistan from 2009 to 2010 and the NATO Senior Civilian Representative in Afghanistan in 2010. He was the Permanent Under-Secretary of State at the Home Office from February 2013 to April 2017.

== Early life and education ==
Sedwill was born in Ealing. He attended Bourne Grammar School in Bourne, Lincolnshire, becoming the head boy. He went to the University of St Andrews, where he took a Bachelor of Science (BSc) degree in economics; later, he gained a Master of Philosophy (MPhil) degree in economics from St Edmund Hall, Oxford. While at St Andrews, Sedwill joined the Royal Marines Reserve.

== Career ==
=== Early diplomatic career ===
Sedwill joined the Foreign and Commonwealth Office (FCO) in 1989 and he served in the Security Coordination Department and the Gulf War Emergency Unit until 1991.

He was then posted in Cairo, Egypt, from 1991 to 1994 as a Second Secretary, then First Secretary in Iraq from 1996 to 1997 whilst serving as a United Nations weapons inspector, then in Nicosia, Cyprus, as First Secretary for Political-Military Affairs and Counterterrorism from 1997 to 1999. He was the Private Secretary to the Secretary of State for Foreign and Commonwealth Affairs (Robin Cook and later Jack Straw) from 2000 to 2002 in the run-up to and preparations for the 2003 Iraq invasion.

He then served as the Deputy High Commissioner to Pakistan, based in Islamabad from 2003 to 2005, then the Deputy Director for the Middle East and North Africa Department of the Foreign Office. From 2006 to 2008, he served as International Director of the UK Border Agency, part of the Home Office.

=== Afghanistan ambassador and NATO roles ===
In April 2009, Sedwill became the Ambassador to Afghanistan, succeeding Sherard Cowper-Coles. In January 2010, he was additionally appointed as NATO's Senior Civilian Representative in Afghanistan, to be the civilian counterpart to the ISAF Commander, U.S. General Stanley A. McChrystal and then U.S. General David Petraeus. He was succeeded as ambassador temporarily by his predecessor, Cowper-Coles, and then by William Patey, formerly British Ambassador to Saudi Arabia.

In May 2011, Sedwill took over as the FCO's Director-General for Afghanistan and Pakistan (and thus as the UK's Special Representative for Afghanistan and Pakistan) from Karen Pierce. He additionally became the FCO's Director-General, Political, in autumn 2012, replacing Geoffrey Adams.

Sedwill said of his life before government "I've had a gun in my face from Saddam Hussein's bodyguards. A bomb under my seat at a polo match in the foothills of the Himalayas; I've been hosted by a man plotting to have me assassinated; I've been shot at, mortared and even had someone come after me with a suicide vest."

=== Home Office and National Security Adviser ===
In February 2013, Sedwill became the Permanent Secretary at the Home Office, filling the vacancy left by Helen Ghosh. Sedwill replaced Mark Lyall Grant as National Security Adviser in the Cabinet Office in April 2017.

During his time as Permanent Secretary, one of the organisations the Home Office is responsible for, MI5, failed to adequately safeguard data. In 2019 Lord Justice Sir Adrian Fulford stated MI5 had a "historical lack of compliance" with sections of the Investigatory Powers Act in 2016.

=== Cabinet Secretary ===
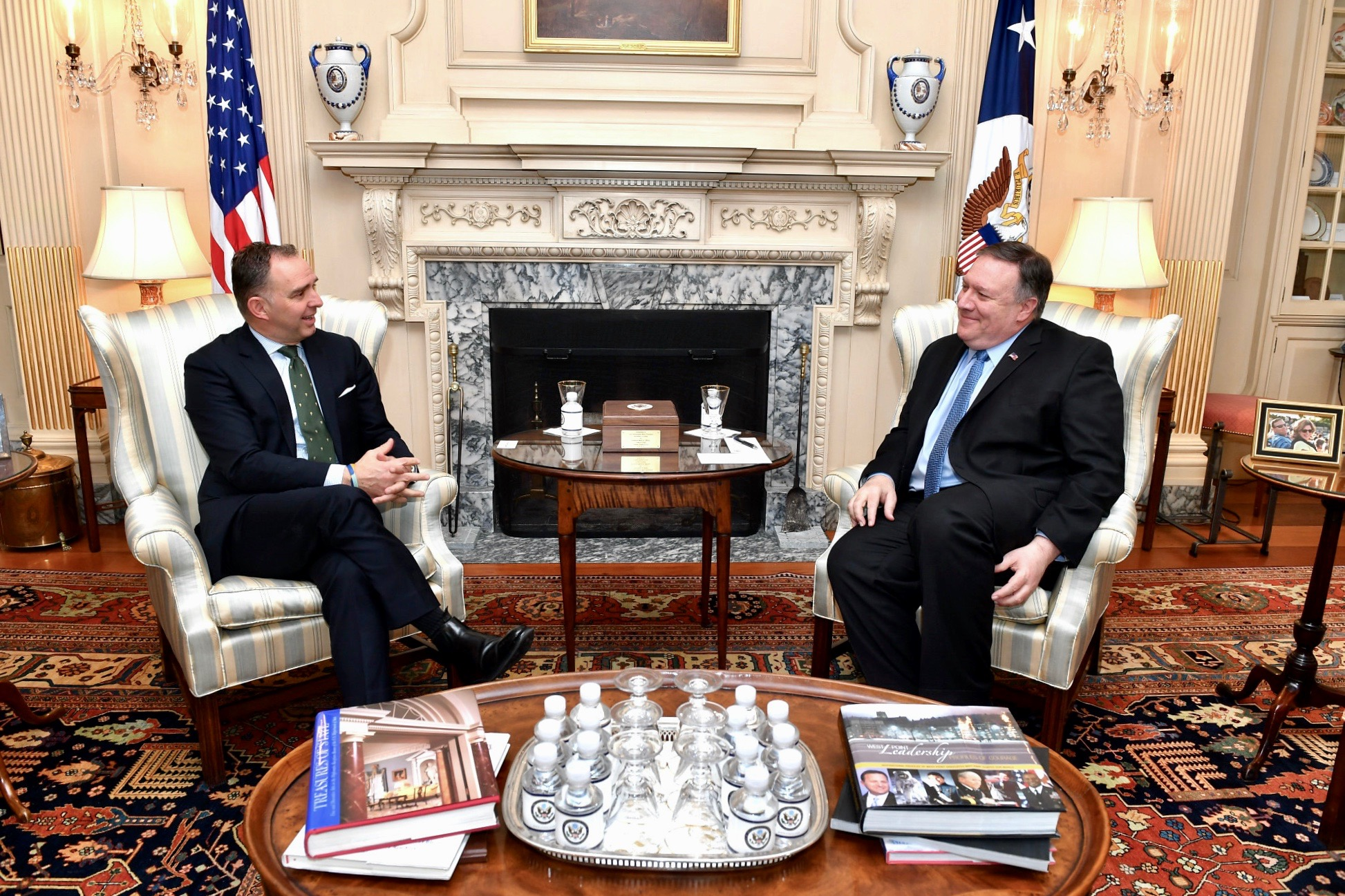
Sedwill (left) meets with US Secretary of State Mike Pompeo in March 2019.

Sedwill became acting Cabinet Secretary in June 2018, while Jeremy Heywood took a leave of absence on medical grounds, and was appointed to replace Heywood on his retirement on 24 October 2018. He is the second Cabinet Secretary never to have worked at HM Treasury, and the first whose career has been dominated by diplomatic and security work. He was described as the Prime Minister's "first and only choice" to replace Heywood, with no recruitment process taking place and some suggesting the urgency of arrangements for the UK's departure from the European Union as a reason for the quick appointment. Prime Minister Theresa May was criticised for allowing Sedwill to remain as National Security Adviser alongside his role as Cabinet Secretary, with speculation that the role was being kept for Europe adviser Oliver Robbins.

In a February 2019 interview Sedwill said he would retain his role as National Security Adviser to the Prime Minister since becoming Cabinet Secretary is part of moves to make a success of Brexit. In an interview with Civil Service Quarterly, Sedwill said retaining the post would also ensure a "genuine sense of teamwork across and beyond government".

In April 2019 it was reported that Sedwill had written to ministers on the National Security Council and their special advisers after The Daily Telegraph reported details of a meeting about Chinese telecoms company Huawei. Following the meeting of the council, the Telegraph reported that it had agreed to allow Huawei limited access to help build Britain's new 5G network, amid warnings about possible risks to national security. Several cabinet ministers have denied they were involved.

In July 2019, The Times reported that two unnamed senior civil servants had said the 70-year-old Jeremy Corbyn might have to stand down due to health issues. The article drew an angry response from Labour, which denounced the comments as a "scurrilous" attempt to undermine the party's efforts to gain power. Downing Street said that Sedwill would write to Corbyn after the party demanded an inquiry into alleged comments. Corbyn said the civil service has a duty to be non-political.

In November 2019, Sedwill blocked the publication of a document written by civil servants to cost the Labour Party's fiscal plans before a general election. Shadow Chancellor John McDonnell had complained to Treasury Permanent Secretary Tom Scholar in a meeting arguing it would interfere in the upcoming general election.

In June 2020, it was announced that Sedwill would be stepping down from his civil service appointments in September 2020. The Telegraph said that Downing Street regarded Sedwill as "too much of a Europhile and establishment figure" to be in post through planned Whitehall reforms.

Sedwill stepped down as national security adviser in September 2020. He was to be replaced by David Frost, who was Johnson's special adviser and chief negotiator in talks on the post-Brexit trade and security relationship with the EU. This would be a political appointment, while all previous national security advisers had been civil servants. However, an FOI answer stated that Frost continued as Chief Negotiator to the EU as of October 2020, and David Quarrey took over the role of acting NSA.

Sedwill was replaced as Cabinet Secretary and Head of the Home Civil Service by Simon Case on 9 September 2020.

=== Later career ===
Sedwill is a senior adviser and supervisory board member of Rothschild & Co, senior adviser and member of McKinsey & Company’s Geopolitics Advisory Council, and sits on the board of directors of Hakluyt & Company. He is also the chairman of the Atlantic Future Forum and chairman of the trustees of the International Institute for Strategic Studies. He was previously a non-executive director of BAE Systems plc between 2022 and 2024, and was the senior independent director and senior deputy chair of Lloyd's of London between 2021 and 2025.

Speaking to the Covid Inquiry, Simon Case and Sedwill described Boris Johnson’s Downing Street as “poisonous”, “mad” and unfit to run the country. Giving evidence, “I’ve never seen a bunch of people less well-equipped to run a country,” Simon Case, then head official in the Cabinet Office, wrote in July 2020 to Mark Sedwill.

In October 2025, Sedwill was heavily rumoured to be the frontrunner to replace Peter Mandelson as British Ambassador to the United States, though the role ultimately went to Christian Turner.

Sedwill has served as a non-executive member of the Court of the University of St Andrews. He was a candidate in the 2026 election for the position of Chancellor of the University of St Andrews, which was won by Dame Anne Pringle.

== Personal life ==
Sedwill married in 1999 and has one daughter. He is a Fellow of the Royal Geographical Society, Fellow of the Institute of Directors, President of the Special Forces Club, and a Liveryman of the Worshipful Company of Stationers and Newspaper Makers. He is also a trustee and Council member of the Royal National Lifeboat Institution (RNLI).

== In popular culture ==
In the 2023 Channel 4 docudrama Partygate, Sedwill was portrayed by Anthony Calf.

== Honours ==
Sedwill was appointed Companion of the Order of St Michael and St George (CMG) in 2008 Birthday Honours, promoted in the same Order to Knight Commander (KCMG) in the 2018 New Year Honours and then to Knight Grand Cross (GCMG) in the 2023 New Year Honours, all for services to British foreign policy, national security and HM Government.

Sedwill is a Master of the Bench of the Middle Temple, one of the four Inns of Court.

In July 2021, he was appointed an Honorary Colonel in the Royal Marines Reserve. He was awarded an Honorary Doctorate from the University of St Andrews in 2022.

On 11 September 2020 he was created Baron Sedwill, of Sherborne in the County of Dorset. He made his maiden speech during a debate in the House of Lords about the Russian invasion of Ukraine on 25 February 2022.

Country	Date	Appointment	Ribbon	Post-nominal letters	Notes
United Kingdom	14 June 2008	Companion of the Order of St Michael and St George		CMG	Promoted to KCMG in 2017
United Kingdom	30 December 2017	Knight Commander of the Order of St Michael and St George		KCMG	Promoted to GCMG in 2022
United Kingdom	30 December 2022	Knight Grand Cross of the Order of St Michael and St George		GCMG	
North Atlantic Treaty Organization		NATO Meritorious Service Medal		NATO MSM	
Lord Sedwill received 2 other medals that are unidentifiable.

== Notes ==
Diplomatic posts
Preceded by Sir Sherard Cowper-Coles	British Ambassador to Afghanistan; 2009–10	Succeeded by Sir William Patey
Preceded by Fernando Gentilini	NATO Senior Civilian Representative in Afghanistan; January–June 2010	Succeeded by Sir Simon Gass
Preceded by Karen Pierce	Director, Afghanistan & Pakistan of the Foreign and Commonwealth Office; 2010–2012	Succeeded by Richard Crompton as Director, South Asia and Afghanistan
Preceded by Sir Geoffrey Adams	Director-General, Political of the Foreign and Commonwealth Office; 2012–2013	Succeeded by Sir Simon Gass
Government offices
Preceded by Dame Helen Ghosh	Permanent Secretary of the Home Office; 2013–2017	Succeeded by Philip Rutnam
Preceded by Sir Mark Lyall Grant	National Security Adviser; 2017–2020	Succeeded by Sir Stephen Lovegrove (2021)
Preceded by Sir Jeremy Heywood	Head of the Home Civil Service; Cabinet Secretary; 2018–2020	Succeeded by Simon Case
Orders of precedence in the United Kingdom
Preceded by The Lord Sikka	Gentlemen; Baron Sedwill	Followed by The Lord Sharpe of Epsom
