= Klaus-Peter Klaiber =

Klaus-Peter Klaiber, KCMG (born June 21, 1940 (age 85) in Stuttgart, Germany), is a former German senior diplomat. He was the Head of Policy and Planning for German Foreign Minister Hans-Dietrich Genscher. Later, NATO Assistant Secretary General for Political Affairs (the no. 3 position) and EU Special Representative for Afghanistan.

== Life ==
Klaiber's father was Manfred Klaiber - the first State-Secretary of the Office of the Federal President of Germany after WWII. And later Ambassador to Rome.

Klaus-Peter Klaiber studied law at the University of Bonn and the University of Tübingen. Two years later, he received his doctorate from the University of Mainz with a dissertation titled "The Cancellation of administrative acts in French Law". That same year, he completed postgraduate studies in economics and history at the Graduate Institute of International Studies in Geneva in 1967.

Klaiber entered the German Foreign Service in 1968. He was posted in Bonn for five years at the Federal Foreign Office Training Center (1973-1977). He held posts abroad at the German embassies in Zaire (1971-1973), Washington (1977-1980) and Kenya (1980-1982).

In 1982, he was promoted to Deputy Head of the Department for European Political Cooperation at the Foreign Office in Bonn. In 1985, the then-Foreign Minister Hans-Dietrich Genscher appointed him Deputy Director of the Ministerial Office.

In 1988, he became Minister-Counselor (political affairs) at the German Embassy in London.

From 1992-1995, he was Deputy Political Director of the Foreign Office and Head of the Ministry's Security Policy Sub-Division. From 1995-1997, he was Head of the Policy Planning of the German Foreign Office in Bonn.

In 1997, Klaiber became NATO's Assistant Secretary General for Political Affairs, serving during the Balkan conflicts in Kosovo.

In 2001, he became the European Union's first Special Representative for Afghanistan. In this capacity he supported the establishment of a transitional government and the establishment of democratic institutions. He held this position until 2002. His replacement was Francesc Vendrell.

In 2002, Klaiber became German Ambassador to Australia. In 2005, he ended his diplomatic career in Canberra, where he retired with his wife Karleen - an Australian citizen.

Dr. Klaiber is the world-wide Vice Chair of the Global Panel Foundation, a prominent NGO which is known for its work - behind the scenes - in conflict zones around the world.
