= Annette Weber =

German political scientist

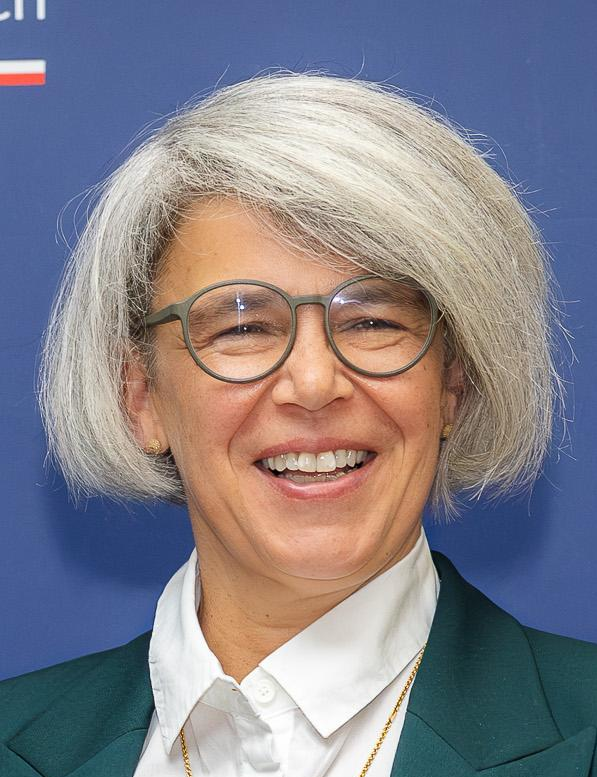
- Weber in 2024

European Union Special Representative for the Horn of Africa
- Incumbent
- Assumed office 1 July 2021
- Preceded by: Alexander Rondos

Personal details
- Born: 1 November 1967 (age 58) Germany
- Education: Free University of Berlin
- Occupation: Political scientist, journalist, novelist

Annette Weber (born 1 November 1967) is a German political scientist specialised in Northeast Africa and gender studies. She has been serving as European Union Special Representative (EUSR) for the Horn of Africa since 1 July 2021. Weber previously worked as a journalist, a human rights defender and most recently as the regional expert at the German Institute for International and Security Affairs (German: Stiftung Wissenschaft und Politik; SWP). She is also a novelist.

== Life ==
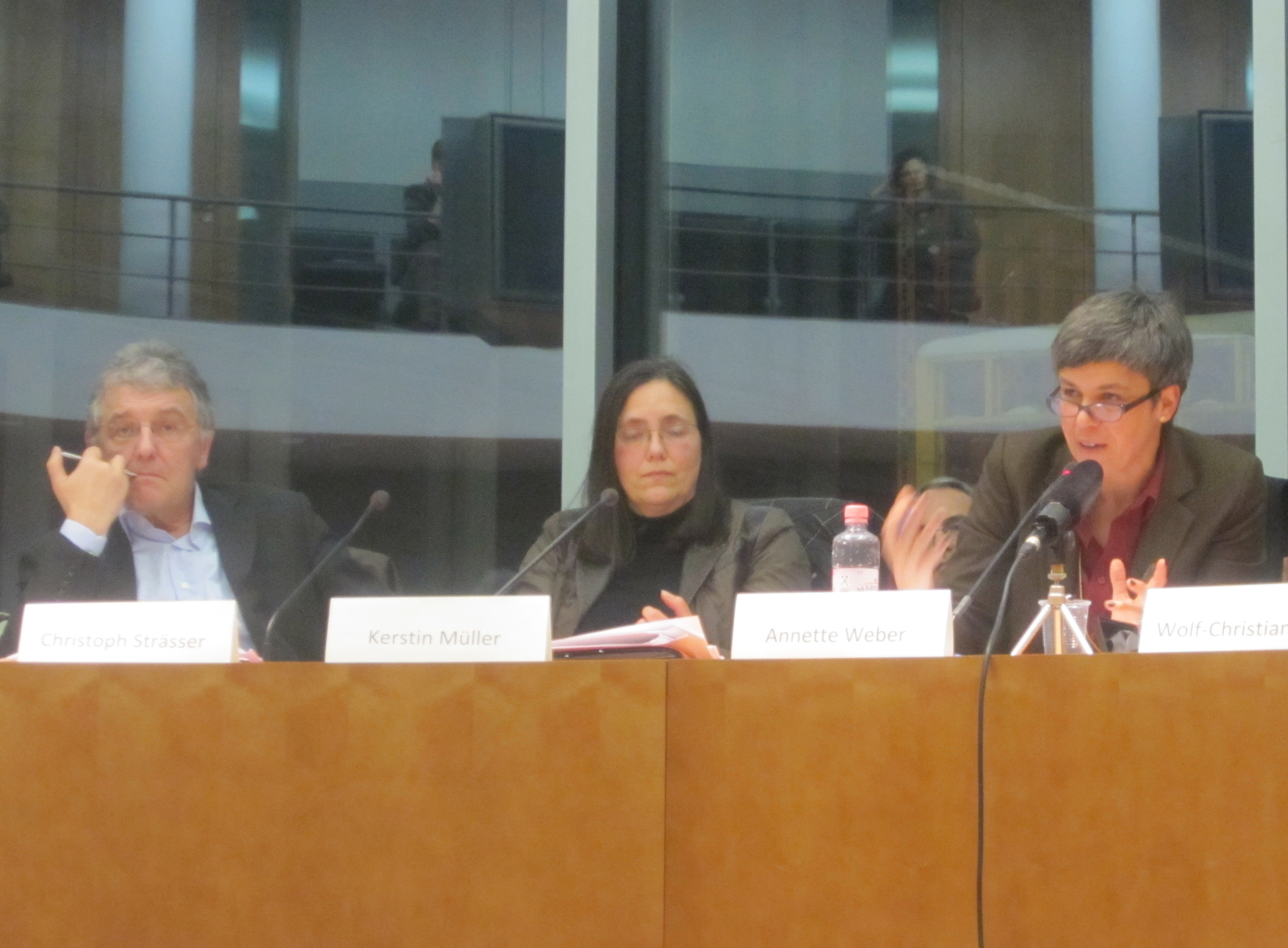
Weber (right) in January 2010 during a panel discussion at the German federal parliament about the 2010 Sudanese general election and the 2011 South Sudanese independence referendum next to MPs Kerstin Müller (Greens) and Christoph Strässer (SPD)

Weber earned her Master of Arts in Political science from the Free University of Berlin (FU). During the 1990s, she worked as a freelance music journalist in Los Angeles and Prague. Weber wrote articles for German publications, such as the weekly Jungle World, the bi-monthly Spex magazine, the daily Die Tageszeitung, the monthly Visions magazine, and the bi-weekly Zitty magazine. She focused on the genres and subcultures of Hip Hop and Riot grrrl, an underground feminist punk movement . An example for her reporting at the time is an interview conducted in 1996 with the US-rapper Chuck D of Public Enemy about the political symbolisms of violence in his lyrics and live appearances.

In 1999, Weber joined the East Africa team of Amnesty International at its headquarters in London for about two years as a researcher. From 2003 until 2006, she worked in Berlin as the coordinator of the Ecumenical Network on Central Africa (German: Ökumenisches Netzwerk Zentralafrika – ÖNZ).

On 23 April 2006, Weber defended her PhD thesis at the FU Berlin magna cum laude. The English-language study dealt with gender roles between civilians and combatants in the armed conflicts of Northeast and Central Africa with a special focus on what was then Southern Sudan. The peace researcher Ulrich Albrecht (1941–2016) initially was supervising her research, but the final supervisor was the political scientist Marianne Braig, with the ethnologist Ute Luig as the second assessor.

In 2007, Weber joined the Berlin-based Stiftung Wissenschaft und Politik (SWP), a semi-official think tank which advises the Bundestag (the German parliament) and the federal government on foreign and security policy issues. As a member of their Africa and Middle East research group, she focused on the Horn of Africa. Following a research stay in Ethiopia from 2010 until 2012, Weber chaired the regional SWP research group in 2013 and 2014.

Between 2012 and 2019, Weber was a senior advisor to the Berghof Foundation, a German non-governmental and nonprofit organisation working for sustainable peace through conflict transformation. Her project there, which was funded by the German Federal Foreign Office, supported the mediation efforts by the African Union between the government of Sudan and various rebel groups in the country.

In 2018, Weber published her first novel, titled Eurythmie der Gewalt ("Eurythmy of violence"). The plot is based in present times and combines political and pop cultural themes from Germany, Eastern Africa and California. It features the Russian occultist Madame Blavatsky and the Anthroposophical Society as well as white and Black secret societies, Charles Manson, Rap, the West German far-left militant organization Red Army Faction (RAF), al-Shabaab, female Nazi-aircraft pilots during the Second World War and the South Sudanese Civil War. Literary critics praised both the depth of autobiographical elements and the freshness of the German language.

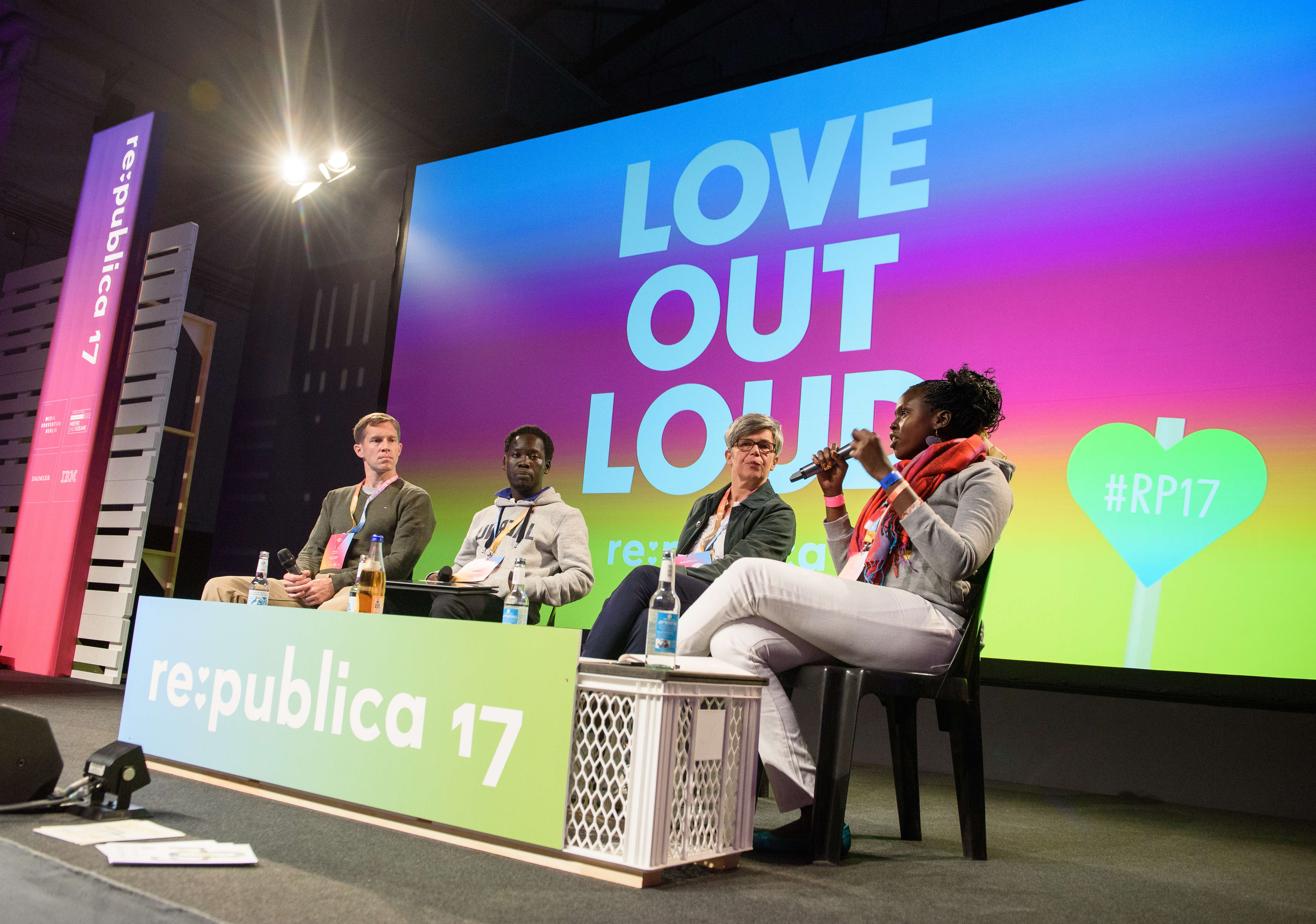
At the re:publica17 on a panel discussing "Social media and Conflict: How to mitigate online hate speech that fuels violence?"

From 2019 until 2021, Weber was also a senior advisor at the Centre for Humanitarian Dialogue, which is headquartered in Geneva. In 2020, she became a team member for the United Nations' Independent Assessment on International Support for Security of Somalia. On 21 June 2021, the Foreign Affairs Council (FAC) of the Council of the European Union adopted during its session in Luxembourg the decision to appoint Weber in the context of the Common Foreign and Security Policy of the European Union to succeed Alexander Rondos and serve from 1 July as EU Special Representative for the Horn of Africa. The FAC defines the region as consisting of Djibouti, Eritrea, Ethiopia, Kenya, Somalia, South Sudan, Sudan and Uganda. It also mandates Weber to reach out to neighbouring countries of the Red Sea, the Nile Basin, the Arabian Peninsula and North Africa. The residence of the office is Nairobi. Weber's mandate runs until 31 August 2022, but may be extended beyond that date. Article 2 (3) of the decision stipulates as the general objectives

»to support peace and security, democracy, human rights, rule of law, gender equality, humanitarian principles and International humanitarian law (IHL), sustainable development, economic growth, climate action and regional cooperation.«

Among the specific goals is a negotiated solution on the Grand Ethiopian Renaissance Dam (GERD).

== Selected works ==
- Why a Feminist Standpoint Epistemology Is Necessary in Times of Hegemonic Masculinity: Thoughts on Intersectionality and Transrationality, in: Josefina Echavarría Alvarez, Daniela Ingruber and Norbert Koppensteiner (ed.): Echoes to Many Peaces: Transrational Resonances; Palgrave Macmillan, Cham, 2018; pp. 83–108
- Profiteers of Migration? Authoritarian States in Africa and European Migration Management, with Anne Koch and Isabelle Werenfels (eds.), SWP Research Paper 2018/RP 04, 2018
- Covid-19 in the Horn of Africa – Gaining Trust in a Crisis, SWP Comment 2020/C 20, 06.05.2020

A comprehensive list of publications (as of May 2021) by Weber can be downloaded as a PDF file from Weber's SWP webpage
