= NATO Senior Civilian Representative in Afghanistan =

The NATO senior civilian representative in Afghanistan represented the political leadership of the NATO Alliance in Kabul, Afghanistan until December 2021, when the office of NATO’s senior civilian representative was closed following the Taliban takeover of the country.

The senior civilian representative carried forward the alliance's political-military objectives in Afghanistan, liaising with the Afghan government, civil society, representatives of the international community and neighbouring countries. The position was created in 2003.

== List of Senior Civilian Representatives ==
- 2003–2006: Hikmet Çetin (Turkey)
- 2006–2007: Daan Everts (Netherlands)
- 2008: Maurits Jochems (Netherlands) (acting)
- 2008–2010: Fernando Gentilini (Italy)
- 2010–2011: Mark Sedwill (United Kingdom)
- 2011–2012: Simon Gass (United Kingdom)
- 2012–2015: Maurits Jochems (Netherlands)
- 2015–2016: Ambassador Ismail Aramaz, (Turkey)
- 2017-2019: Ambassador Cornelius Zimmermann, (Germany)
- 2019-2020: Ambassador Nicholas Kay, (United Kingdom)
- 2020-2021: Ambassador Stefano Pontecorvo, (Italy)
