= Ahtisaari Plan =

Proposed settlement for the political status of Kosovo

Comprehensive Proposal for the Kosovo Status Settlement
- Type: Peace agreement
- Drafted: 15/26 March 2007
- Mediators: Martti Ahtisaari
- Ahtisaari Plan

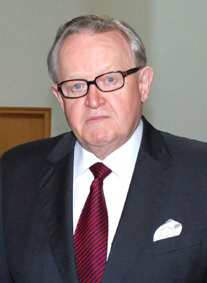

The Ahtisaari Plan, formally the Comprehensive Proposal for the Kosovo Status Settlement (CSP), is a status settlement proposed in March 2007 by Martti Ahtisaari, the Special Envoy of the UN Secretary-General, covering a wide range of issues related to the status of Kosovo.

The plan was presented to the UN Secretary-General on 15 March, and then sent to the UN Security Council on 26 March, where it was discussed for the first time on 3 April, and later on several other occasions during 2007 and 2008, without formal adoption or rejection.

Some of the main components of the plan include the formation of the International Steering Group for Kosovo (ISG), the International Civilian Representative for Kosovo (ICR), and the European Union Special Representative (EUSR) for Kosovo, appointed by the Council of the European Union.

== Overview ==
The proposal included provisions covering:

- Constitutional provisions
- Rights of Communities and their Members
- Decentralization of local government
- Justice system
- Religious and cultural heritage
- International debt
- Property and archives
- National security
- International Civilian Representative
- European Security and Defense Policy (ESDP) Rule of Law mission
- International Military Presence (such as the continuation of KFOR)
- Legislative agenda

While not yet mentioning the word "independence", it included several provisions that were widely interpreted as implying statehood for Kosovo. For example, it would give Kosovo the right to apply for membership in international organizations, create a security force and adopt national symbols.

== History ==
Martti Ahtisaari stated in February 2007, after a period of consultations with the parties, that he would finalize his settlement proposal for submission to the UN Security Council, where he would also elaborate on the status issue itself.

In Belgrade, Serbian Prime Minister Vojislav Koštunica refused to meet Ahtisaari. Koštunica claimed that because Serbia had still not formed a new government after the January 21 parliamentary elections, he had no mandate to discuss Kosovo and therefore could not do so. Nevertheless, he later denounced the proposal as "illegitimate and unacceptable" because it allegedly "violates the U.N. Charter ... by undermining sovereignty of U.N. member Serbia." President Boris Tadić did meet Ahtisaari, however, after which he reaffirmed his vow to never accept an independent Kosovo. Foreign Minister Vuk Drašković warned that it was "necessary to avoid an imposed solution that could cause Serbia to become a factor of instability."

In Pristina, Kosovo Albanian leaders issued a statement after meeting with Ahtisaari stating they are "convinced that the international process for the resolution of Kosovo's status led by President Ahtisaari will be concluded soon with Kosovo becoming an independent state."

The United States called the proposal "fair and balanced", while the EU Presidency noted that Ahtisaari's proposals "build on almost twelve months of direct talks between Belgrade and Pristina."

On 21 February 2007, Ahtisaari began a period of consultations with the parties in Vienna to finalize the settlement. He made clear that his proposal was a draft and that he would incorporate compromise solutions into the final document. After this period of consultations and further modification, Ahtisaari convened a high-level meeting of the parties in Vienna on March 10. After this meeting, leaders from both sides signaled a total unwillingness to compromise on their central demands (Kosovo Albanians for Kosovo's independence; Serbia for continued sovereignty over Kosovo). Concluding that there was no chance for the two sides to reconcile their positions, Ahtisaari said he intended to submit his proposed status recommendations to the UN Security Council, including an explicit recommendation for the status outcome itself by the end of March.

On 2 March 2007, final Serbian amendments to the drafted plan were presented to Ahtisaari, proposing that all articles on the independence should be redrafted or omitted.

On 15 March 2007, Ahtisaari sent the final version of the drafted plan to the UN Secretary General Ban Ki-Moon, who supported the plan and on 26 March sent it to the UN Security Council.

On 3 April 2007, the Ahtisaari plan was discussed for the first time at the closed session of the UN Security Council, but no agreement was reached regarding its formal adoption, or rejection.

=== Later developments ===
In November 2008, the EU accepted the demand of Serbia not to implement the plan of Ahtisaari through EULEX.

In early 2012, then Serbian President Boris Tadić recommended his Five-Point Plan for Kosovo, essentially a reworking of the Ahtisaari Plan.

On 10 September 2012, the International Steering Group had its final meeting and formally ended its supervision,

With immediate effect, the CSP no longer exists as a separate and superior legal power, and the Constitution of the Republic of Kosovo now constitutes the sole basis for the country’s legal framework.

and Kosovo became responsible for its own governance.

== Reaction ==
On February 10, 2007, Kosovar Albanians protested against the Ahtisaari Plan. Two were killed and others seriously injured after Romanian Police serving in UNMIK fired rubber bullets at the demonstrators.

== See also ==
- Rambouillet Agreement
