= Vygaudas Ušackas =

Lithuanian diplomat and politician

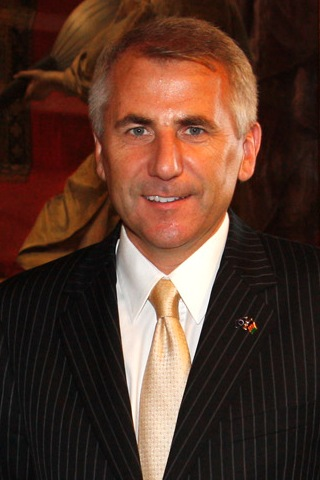

Board Member of Avia Solutions Group
- Incumbent
- Assumed office September 2019

Ambassador of the European Union to the Russian Federation
- In office 1 September 2013 – 1 October 2017
- Preceded by: Fernando M. Valenzuela
- Succeeded by: Markus Ederer

Special Representative of the European Union to the Islamic Republic of Afghanistan
- In office 1 April 2010 – 1 September 2013
- Preceded by: Ettore Francesco Sequi
- Succeeded by: Franz-Michael Skjold Mellbin

Minister of Foreign Affairs of Lithuania
- In office 9 December 2008 – 26 January 2010
- President: Dalia Grybauskaitė
- Prime Minister: Andrius Kubilius
- Preceded by: Petras Vaitiekūnas
- Succeeded by: Audronius Ažubalis

Personal details
- Born: 16 December 1964 (age 61) Skuodas, Lithuanian SSR, Soviet Union
- Party: Homeland Union

Vygaudas Ušackas (born 16 December 1964 in Skuodas, Lithuania) is Member of the Board of Directors of a Lithuanian born European-American company Avia Solutions Group, which is a Leader in End-to-End Capacity Provider for Passenger and Cargo Airlines Worldwide.

Vygaudas Usackas is a former Lithuanian diplomat, from September 2013 to October 2017 he served as the European Union's Ambassador to Russia. Prior to that he served as the EU Special Representative for Afghanistan. Prior to heading Lithuania's Ministry of Foreign Affairs, Ušackas was the Ambassador of Lithuania to the United States and Mexico from 2001 through 2006, then Ambassador to the United Kingdom. Founder of Mission Siberia.

== Diplomatic Service ==
On 22 March 2010 he was appointed by Catherine Ashton as the European Union's special envoy for Afghanistan.
