= Vervaeke =

Vervaeke is a Dutch surname. Notable people with the surname include:

- Koen Vervaeke (born 1959), Belgian diplomat
- Louis Vervaeke (born 1993), Belgian cyclist

== See also ==
- Vervaecke, a surname
