= Netherlands Institute for Multiparty Democracy =

Non-profit organization

- Abbreviation: NIMD
- Formation: 2000
- Type: non-profit NGO
- Location: The Hague
- Chairman: [[Sven Koopmans]]
- Website: nimd.org

The Netherlands Institute for Multiparty Democracy (NIMD; Dutch: Nederlands Instituut voor Meerpartijendemocratie) works to promote peaceful, just and inclusive politics worldwide. NIMD's approach is characterized by dialogue, which it facilitates for actors across the political spectrum at the local, national and regional level. The organization's values are based on inclusiveness, pluralism and equality, and it supports joint initiatives of political parties and other stakeholders to improve the functioning of multiparty democracies around the world.

The institute was founded in 2000 by seven parties across the Dutch political spectrum (CDA, PvdA, VVD, GL, D66, CU and SGP). Former diplomat and politician Sven Koopmans is Chair of the Supervisory Council of NIMD, replacing former Ambassador to the Netherlands Ed Kronenburg.

== Activities ==
NIMD currently works with over 150 political parties from more than 20 countries in Africa, Latin America, the MENA region, Southeast Asia and Eastern Europe. The Institute promotes interparty dialogue between politicians, providing the opportunity to build trust and create mutual relationship among political parties. Moreover, interparty dialogue can create consensus and help to find solutions to challenges. NIMD also uses dialogue to create a safe meeting space for politicians and parties to meet and adopt policies to reform their nations.

A core part of NIMD's work is its Democracy Schools. The organization sets up Democracy Schools around the world, which run courses for young and aspiring politicians who want to gain knowledge and skills on democratic theory and governance. The schools also provide specialized training for established politicians seeking learn about areas such as legislative drafting, debate techniques and internal party democratization. Some alumni of NIMD's Democracy School programmes have later entered public office and passed legislation in areas such as campaign finance transparency and the prevention of violence against women.

Through all its programmes, NIMD aims to promote the political participation of youth and women. NIMD strives to give these and other marginalized groups a seat at the table by, for example, promoting gender parity in its activities, and helping parties to break down internal barriers to the participation of minorities.
