= Xavier Bout de Marnhac =

Lieutenant General Xavier Bout de Marnhac (born 7 July 1951 in Trier, West Germany) is a French military commander and former head of the Kosovo Force (KFOR) and of EULEX.
