= Pieter Feith =

Dutch diplomat (born 1945)

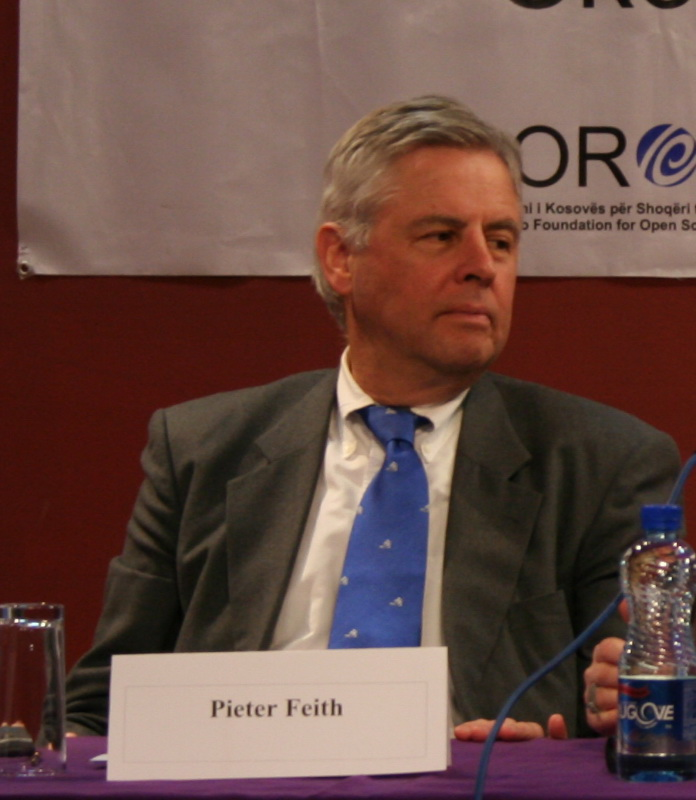

General Secretariat of the Council of the European Union Deputy Director General for Politico-Military
- In office 2001–2010

Personal details
- Born: 9 February 1945 (age 81) Rotterdam, Netherlands
- Education: University of Lausanne, Switzerland

Pieter Cornelis Feith (born 9 February 1945) is a Dutch diplomat, formerly serving as the European Union Special Representative (EUSR) and as the International Civilian Representative in Kosovo.

== About ==
Feith was born in Rotterdam, the Netherlands, and studied political science at the University of Lausanne, Switzerland, and is a graduate of the Fletcher School of Law and Diplomacy at Medford, Massachusetts, United States (1970).

Feith has been active in foreign affairs since 1970. He has been posted in Damascus, Bonn, New York City (Mission to the United Nations), Khartoum and at the Netherlands Mission to NATO and the Western European Union (WEU), in Brussels. He also chaired the first United Nations Conference of States Parties to the Chemical Weapons Convention at The Hague in 1997.

Feith has been active in the Balkans during his time with NATO, particularly as Political Adviser to Commander IFOR in Bosnia-Herzegovina, and served on the EU Council for mission assessment to Darfur. He also headed the EU Expert Team for Iraq.

In 2005 Feith was head of the Aceh Monitoring Mission, a mandated mission under the European Security and Defence Policy. The successful mission expired in December 2006.

In April 2008 as European Union special representative he led a team of EU officials and approved the Constitution of the partially recognised Republic of Kosovo.

== Bomb attack ==
On 14 November 2008, a bomb exploded outside the office of Feith, in Kosovo's capital, Pristina. Robert Z, Andreas J and Andreas D, agents of Germany's intelligence service the BND, were arrested on suspicion of having thrown the bomb. On 29 November the three men left Pristina on a special flight headed for Berlin.

== Professional experience ==
- 1970 - 1995 - The Netherlands Diplomatic Service
- 1995 - 2001 - North Atlantic Treaty Organisation (NATO), Personal Representative of Secretary General Lord Robertson for Yugoslavia, Director of the Crisis Management and Operations Directorate, Head of the NATO Balkans Task Force and Political Advisor to Commander IFOR Bosnia-Herzegovina.
- 2001 - 2010 - General Secretariat of the Council of the European Union, Deputy Director General for Politico-Military Affairs.
- 2004 - Personal Representative of the EU High Representative, Javier Solana, for Sudan/Darfur.
- 2005 - Head of EU Expert Team for Iraq.
- 2005 - 2006 - Head of the EU-led Aceh Monitoring Mission (AMM) in Indonesia.
- 2007 - Civilian Operations Commander for all civilian ESDP Crisis Management Operations, Acting Director of the EU Civilian Planning and Conduct Capability.
- 2008 - 2011 - European Union Special Representative for Kosovo
- 2008 - 2012 - International Civilian Representative for Kosovo

== Personal life ==
He is married to Christina Wachtmeister, who owns Kvesarum Castle, and they have three daughters.
