= Lars-Gunnar Wigemark =

Swedish diplomat (born 1960)

Head of Mission of EULEX
- In office 29 November 2019 – 25 June 2023
- Preceded by: Alexandra Papadopoulou
- Succeeded by: Giovanni Pietro Barbano

EU Ambassador and EU Special Representative for Bosnia and Herzegovina
- In office 1 March 2015 – 31 August 2019
- Preceded by: Peter Sørensen
- Succeeded by: Johann Sattler

Ambassadors of the European Union to Pakistan
- In office 2011–2015
- Succeeded by: Jean François Cautain

Personal details
- Born: 20 March 1960 (age 66) Gothenburg, Sweden
- Height: 1.85 m (6 ft 1 in)
- Education: Harvard University

Lars-Gunnar Bertil Wigemark (born 20 March 1960) is a Swedish diplomat.

== Career ==
Lars-Gunnar Wigemark was born on March 20, 1960, in Gothenburg, Sweden. He graduated from Harvard University in 1984 with an A.B. magna cum laude in Social Sciences and holds a master's degree from the Fletcher School of Law and Diplomacy in International Law and Economics.

In September 2010, the European Union High Representative Catherine Ashton appointed him as the first EU Head of Delegation and Ambassador to Pakistan. Ambassador Wigemark assumed the post in February 2011 and held it until March 2015. He served from 2015 to 2019 as double-hatted EU Ambassador and Special Representative to Bosnia and Herzegovina. In 2019, Wigemark was briefly EU Ambassador at Large for the Arctic. In November 2019, Wigemark was appointed as head of the EU Rule of Law Mission in Kosovo (EULEX), the largest civilian mission under the Common Security and Defence Policy of the European Union. In recognition of his diligent work towards the advancement of the rule of law and justice system in Kosovo, Wigemark received the Presidential Medal for Rule of Law by the President of Kosovo on 9 June. He ended his term as EULEX Head of Mission on 25 June 2023.

Diplomatic posts
Preceded by Peter Sørensen	European Union Special Representative for Bosnia and Herzegovina; 2015 – 2019	Succeeded by Johann Sattler
