= European Union Advisory Mission Ukraine =

2014 European Union Advisory Mission

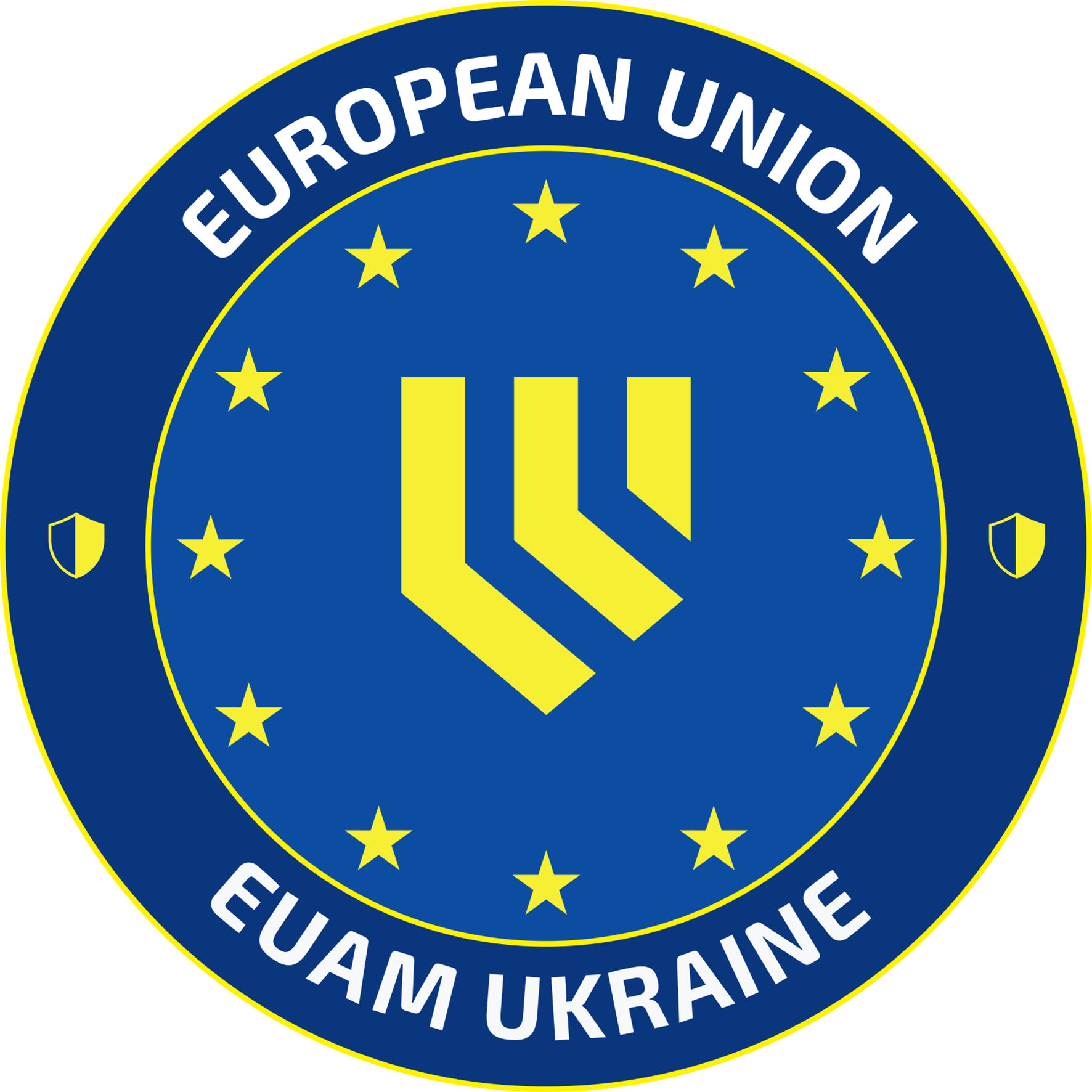
- Formation: December 1, 2014; 11 years ago
- Headquarters: Kyiv, Ukraine
- Head of Mission: Cornelia Taylor
- Parent organization: European Union
- Staff: 437
- Website: www.euam-ukraine.eu

The European Union Advisory Mission for Civilian Security Sector Reform in Ukraine (Ukrainian: Консультативна місія Європейського Союзу з реформування сектору цивільної безпеки України, romanized: Konsultatyvna misiia Yevropeiskoho Soiuzu z reformuvannia sektoru tsyvilnoi bezpeky Ukrainy, EUAM Ukraine) is a civilian Common Security & Defence Policy (CSDP) mission of the European Union. It aims to assist Ukrainian authorities to reform civilian security sector. It provides strategic advice and practical support to make Ukrainian civilian security sector more effective, efficient, transparent and enjoying public trust. EUAM Ukraine works with a number of law enforcement and rule of law institutions of Ukraine, and it formally began operation on 1 December 2014, following Ukrainian Government's request.

EUAM Ukraine has field offices in Kyiv, Lviv, Odesa and a Mobile Unit. Due to Russia’s aggression against Ukraine, the Mission’s field offices in Kharkiv and Mariupol are temporarily non-operational. EUAM Ukraine’s team of over 400 international and Ukrainian mission members works to implement EUAM Ukraine’s mandate.

The Mission implements its mandate through two main operational directions: supporting the reform of Ukraine’s civilian security sector as a part of Ukraine’s EU accession processes and supporting Ukrainian partners in responding to wartime challenges and post-war related needs.

EUAM Ukraine’s mandate is implemented through three lines of operation:

- Strategic advice on civilian security sector reform, in particular, to develop strategic documents and legislation;
- Support for the implementation of reforms through the delivery of practical advice, training, projects, and equipment donations;
- Cooperation and coordination to ensure coherence of reform efforts between Ukrainian and international actors.

== EUAM Priorities ==
Two directions of Mission's work are reflected in seven priority areas.

Civilian Security Sector Reform
Advising on reforms related to EU accession in the civilian security sector, with a particular focus on the implementation of the OAS and its Action Plan.

Integrated Border Management
Advising on the adaptation of Ukraine’s legal and regulatory IBM framework, in line with EU IBM standards and best practices.

Organised crime
Supporting the strengthening of law enforcement capacities to counter SALW proliferation, trafficking, smuggling, financial crime, cybercrime, and the use of organised crime in hybrid campaigns.

Hybrid Threats
Supporting the development of policies, strategies, and capacities to counter hybrid threats, including critical infrastructure protection, cyber-security, foreign information manipulation and interference (FIMI), and Russia’s recruitment of vulnerable groups for subversive and terrorist actions.

Liberated and Adjacent Territories
Supporting stabilisation efforts across liberated and adjacent territories through capacity and resilience building of law enforcement agencies, and by promoting social cohesion and fostering reintegration via community dialogue mechanisms.

International Crimes
Enhancing the capacities of Ukrainian agencies and institutions to investigate and prosecute International Crimes, including war crimes.

Reintegration of Veterans
Supporting the reintegration of veterans into the civilian security and civil protection sectors, in close coordination with the EU Delegation, EU Member States, and other relevant actors.

=== Cross-Cutting Measures ===
EUAM focuses on four «cross-cutting measures» each of which is integrated into the Mission’s five priority areas.

Human Rights, Gender Equality and Minority Rights
Mainstreaming human rights, gender equality and minority perspectives into all advice and support provided to Civilian Security Sector agencies and institutions.
Anti-Corruption
Recognising corruption as an endemic problem in Ukraine, and perhaps the greatest obstacle on the path to reform, to enhance the Anti-Corruption capacity of the police, prosecution and judiciary.
Good Governance
Good governance is concerned with reform in areas such as public administration, public oversight, public finance, and decentralisation.
Digital Transformation and Innovation
Bringing digital and innovative solutions to governance and human resource management.:

== Heads of Mission ==
The current Head of Mission since 1 July 2026 is Cornelia Taylor.

Previous Heads of Mission were:

- Rolf Holmboe (June 2023 – June 2026)
- Antti Juhani Hartikainen (July 2019 – May 2023)
- Kestutis Lancinskas (February 2016 – May 2019)
- Kálmán Mizsei (August 2014 – January 2016)

== Field Offices ==
When the Mission was launched in 2014, it operated from its HQ in Kyiv. As the activities were expanding and number of projects carried out by EUAM Ukraine in the regions increased, two Field Offices (FO) - in Kharkiv and Lviv - were established. In 2018, field office in Odesa and a Mobile Unit that operates across the country were added to support EUAM commitments in the regions. A second Mobile Unit that operated in Mariupol was established in 2019, which, in June 2020, transformed into EUAM Field Office Mariupol to solidify EUAM's expanding activities in the east of Ukraine.

Due to Russia’s unjustified and unprovoked aggression against Ukraine, the Mission’s field offices in Kharkiv and Mariupol are temporarily non-operational.

== Main interlocutors ==
- Ministry of Internal Affairs (MoIA) and its agencies (National Police,, State Border Guard Service National Guardetc.)
- Security Service (SSU)
- General Prosecutor's Office (GPO), as well as
- judiciary authorities and anti-corruption bodies (NABU, SAPO, SBI).

== Main achievements ==
Some of key EUAM Ukraine achievements in the Civilian Security Sector reform include contributing to:

- drafting strategic documents (among them Law on National Security, Ministry of Internal Affairs of Ukraine's Development Strategy 2020, Witness Protection Program, Security Service of Ukraine Reform Concept and Action Plan)
- introduction of a community policing concept into police work
- introduction and promotion of a new approach to public order through police training
- assistance in development of the Serious and Organised Crime Threat Assessment (SOCTA) programme to help fight serious and organised crime
- restructuring the work of police criminal investigation departments by merging investigators and operatives etc.

== Impact of the war ==
Following the Russian missile and drone attacks in central Kyiv on 10 October, the headquarters of the European Union Advisory Mission sustained some damage. There are no casualties among Mission Members.

== See also ==
- European Union Military Assistance Mission in support of Ukraine
