= 25 August 2009 Pristina protests =

- Date: 25 August 2009
- Location: Pristina, Kosovo
- Cause: EULEX–Serbia co-operation
- Organised by: Vetëvendosje
- Participants: Kosovo Albanians and EULEX
- Deaths: None
- Injuries: 1 rioter, 3 police officers
- Property damage: 28 EULEX vehicles
- Arrests: 21 Vetëvendosje members

On 25 August 2009, the Kosovo Albanian Vetëvendosje political group organized protests in Pristina against "the EULEX presence and all its actions in Kosovo including the protocol agreement with Serbia". 24 EULEX vehicles were overthrown and left upside-down, one rioter and three police officers were wounded.

== Sources ==
- Phillips, Leigh (26 August 2009). "Violent protests against EU mission in Kosovo". EUobserver.
- "Violence erupts in Kosovo cities". Europe. BBC News.
- Anna Di Lellio. "Kosovo is restless again". The Guardian.
- Nikolaos Papakostas; Nikolaos Passamitros (1 March 2014). An Agenda for the Western Balkans: From Elite Politics to Social Sustainability. Columbia University Press. pp. 204–. ISBN 978-3-8382-6698-5.
- Prstina Protests
