= Johann Sattler =

Austrian diplomat (born 1969)

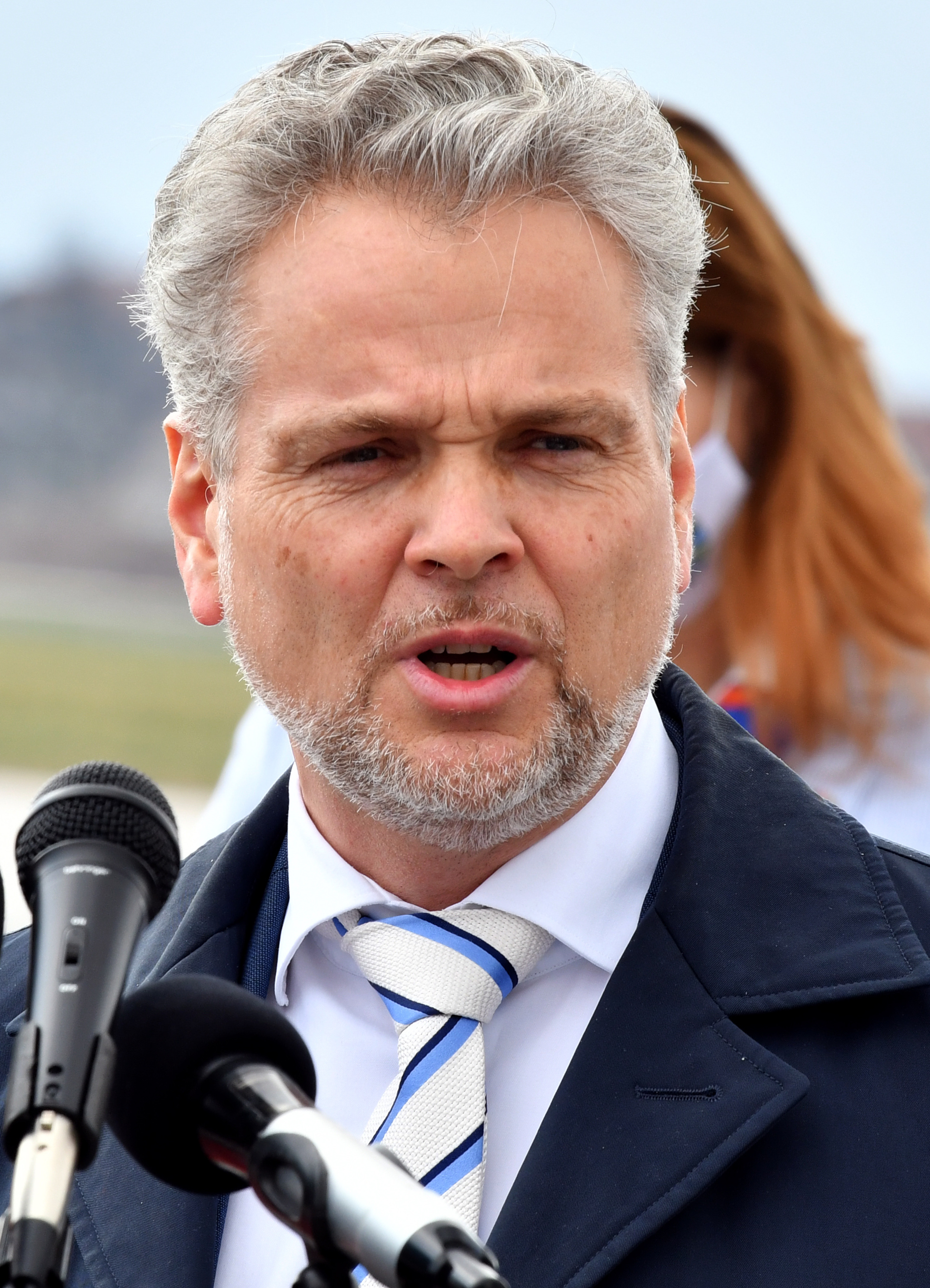
- Sattler in 2021

EU Ambassador and EU Special Representative for Bosnia and Herzegovina
- In office 1 September 2019 – 31 August 2024
- Preceded by: Lars-Gunnar Wigemark
- Succeeded by: Luigi Soreca

Personal details
- Born: 12 January 1969 (age 57)

Johann Sattler (born 12 January 1969) is an Austrian diplomat who served as the EU Ambassador to Bosnia and Herzegovina from 2019 to 2024 and to Montenegro from 2024.

== Biography ==
Sattler studied political science and Slavic studies at the University of Innsbruck, as well as in Prague and Moscow.

In 1996, he graduated from the Diplomatic Academy of Vienna and joined the Austrian foreign service. From 1997 to 1998, he worked as a political officer in Sarajevo and Tirana for the European Community Monitoring Mission (ECMM).

He then occupied various diplomatic posts such as cabinet member of Erhard Busek, EU Special Representative for South Eastern Europe (Stability Pact) in Brussels (1999–2002), counselor for political affairs at the Austrian embassy in Washington, D.C. (2002–2006) and deputy head of the office of secretary-general Johannes Kyrle at the Austrian Ministry of Foreign Affairs (2006–2008).

In 2008 he received a doctorate in political science from the University of Vienna.

From 2008 to 2013, Sattler was managing director and publisher for Funke Mediengruppe and Axel Springer in Moscow.

Sattler re-joined the Austrian foreign service in 2013, when Sebastian Kurz took up office as foreign minister. Sattler served for three years as head of unit for the Western Balkans. In 2016, Kurz appointed him as Austrian ambassador to Albania. Three years later, outgoing foreign minister Karin Kneissl put him forward for a position in the EEAS, and in September 2019 Federica Mogherini appointed Sattler to succeed to Lars-Gunnar Wigemark as Head of EU Delegation and EU Special Representative in Bosnia and Herzegovina. His term ended in September 2024. Following this he was appointed ambassador to Montenegro.

Diplomatic posts
Preceded by Lars-Gunnar Wigemark	European Union Special Representative for Bosnia and Herzegovina; 2019–2024	Succeeded by Luigi Soreca
