= Luigi Soreca =

Italian diplomat

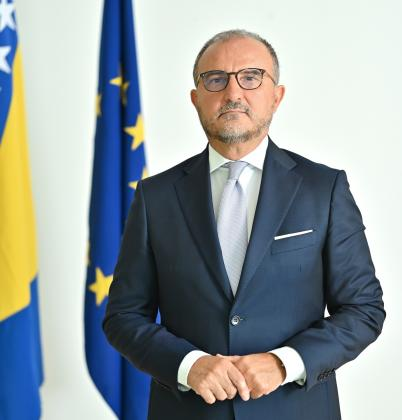
- Official portrait, 2024

EU Ambassador and EU Special Representative for Bosnia and Herzegovina
- Incumbent
- Assumed office 1 September 2024
- Preceded by: Johann Sattler

Personal details
- Education: Luiss University, Rome

Luigi Soreca is an Italian civil servant of the European Commission, serving as the EU Ambassador to Bosnia and Herzegovina since September 2024.

== Biography ==
Soreca holds a degree in law from Luiss University in Rome.

A lawyer by training, Soreca started his career in the banking sector in Italy and since 1992 he worked for the Ministry of the Interior in Italy with a focus on the fight against serious organised crime before joining the European Commission in 1998.

At the European Commission in 2001 he joined DG Justice and Home Affairs as head of unit for international affairs, and later served as head of unit for cooperation among police forces in DG HOME. From 2007 to 2013 Soreca was responsible for the international dimension of migration in DG HOME of the European Commission. During that time, he coordinated the visa liberalisation dialogues with countries in the Western Balkans and the Eastern Partnership, and the implementation of the Global approach to migration and mobility (GAMM), including negotiation and conclusions of Migration and mobility partnerships with Morocco and Tunisia.

Between 2014 and 2018, Soreca was Director for Internal Security in the European Commission's DG HOME, responsible for the fight against terrorism and radicalisation, organised crime, trafficking in human beings and migrant smuggling, drug trafficking, corruption and cybercrime. During this period, he coordinated the adoption of the European agenda on security in 2015 and the EU policy response to the terrorist attacks in 2015-2017 in terms new legislative and policy initiatives.

During the migration crisis in summer 2016, he served as Commission's special envoy to Italy for the relocation process of refugees and migrants and for the coordination of the work of Commission services and EU Agencies.

Between 2018 and 2022, he served as the EU Ambassador and Head of the EU Delegation to Albania. During his term in Tirana, in March 2020 the EU opened accession negotiations with Albania; a first intergovernmental conference was held on 19 July 2022. As EU Ambassador, he also coordinated the EU response to the 2019 Albania earthquake.

In Spring 2022, Soreca was appointed by EU High Representative Josep Borrell as EU special envoy for the external dimension of migration, working at the European External Action Service in Brussels.

In September 2024, he replaced Johann Sattler as EU Ambassador and EU Special Representative to Bosnia and Herzegovina.

Soreca is married.

Diplomatic posts
| Preceded by Johann Sattler | European Union Special Representative for Bosnia and Herzegovina; 2024–present | Incumbent |
