= Sven Koopmans =

Dutch international lawyer and European diplomat

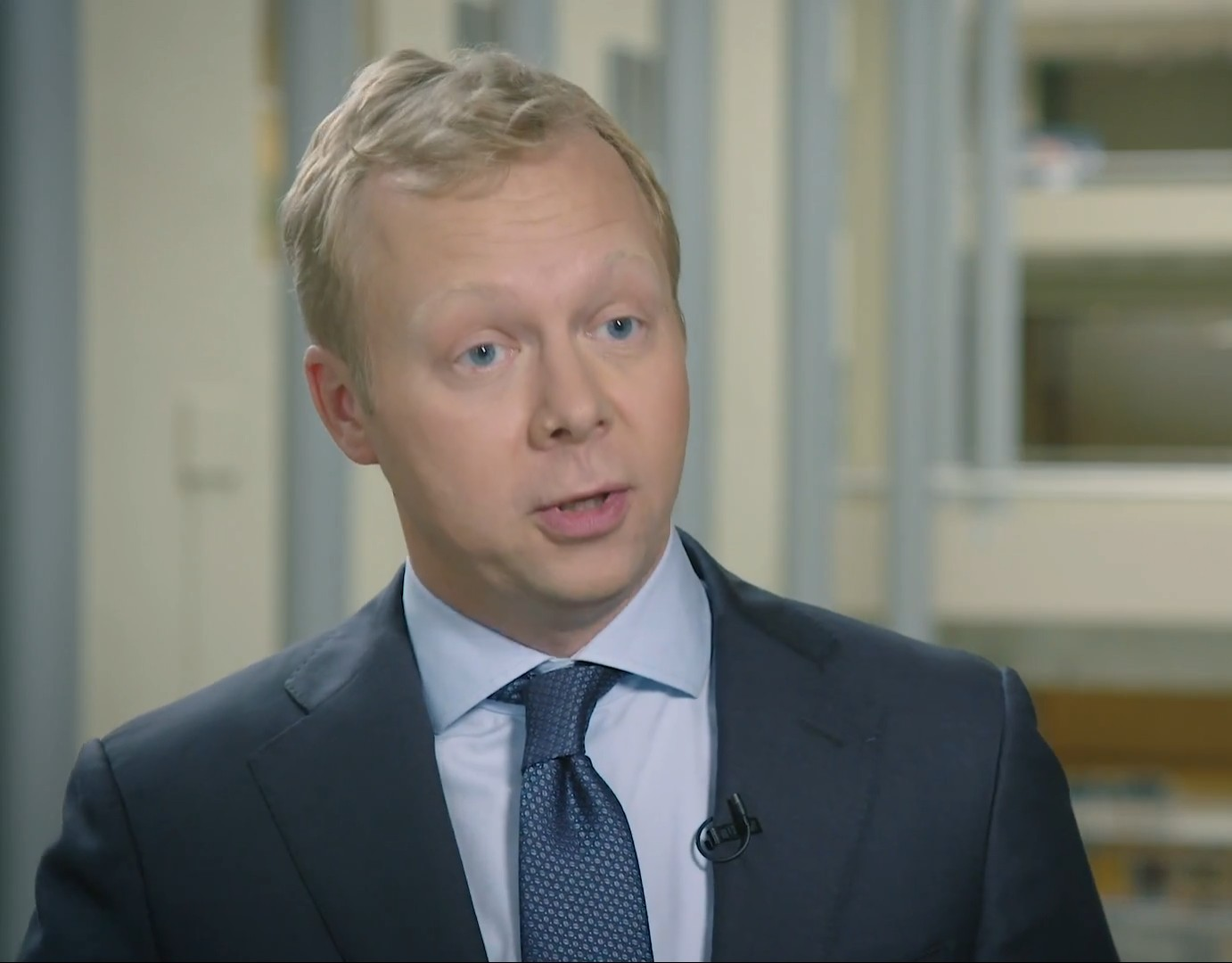

European Union Special Representative for the Middle East Peace Process
- In office 1 May 2021 – 28 February 2025
- Preceded by: Susanna Terstal
- Succeeded by: Luigi Di Maio

Member of the House of Representatives
- In office 23 March 2017 – 31 March 2021

Personal details
- Born: Sven Michael George Koopmans; 20 June 1973 (age 53) Amsterdam
- Party: VVD
- Parent: Aart Koopmans (father)
- Education: Leiden University (LLM; University of Oxford (MJur, DPhil)
- Occupation: Politician; Diplomat; Lawyer

Sven Michael George Koopmans (born 20 June 1973) is a Dutch international lawyer, diplomat and former politician. From 2021 to 2025 he served as the European Union Special Representative for the Middle East Peace Process. Before that he was a member of the House of Representatives for the Peoples Party for Freedom and Democracy from 2017 to 2021.

His father, Aart Koopmans, founded the Alternative Elfstedentocht.

== Career ==
In his role as EUSR, he is charged with providing an active contribution to the final settlement of the Israeli-Palestinian conflict based on a two-state solution, in line with the UNSCR 2334 (2016). He reports directly to the High Representative of the Union for Foreign Affairs and Security Policy, Josep Borrell, on this issue and maintains an overview of all EU regional activities linked to the Middle East Peace Process.

From 2017 to 2021 Koopmans was a Member of Parliament for the People's Party for Freedom and Democracy, first as spokesman on legal affairs, then on foreign affairs and military missions. He was Head of Delegation to the NATO Parliamentary Assembly, President of the Dutch-French Contact Group, Chair of the Parliamentary Commission on Requests and Citizen Initiatives, and Member of the Parliamentary Assembly of the Council of Europe, and the OSCE Parliamentary Assembly. Koopmans is a Knight of the Legion of Honor; he received this award in 2022.

During his time as a Member of Parliament Koopmans submitted an amendment to the Dutch Constitution, adding a preamble to the Constitution. His amendment was approved in second reading by the Dutch Senate in July 2022 and entered into force after publication in August 2022.

Between 2003 and 2016 he was political and legal advisor in peace processes, border conflict mediation and constitutional review processes under the auspices of the European Union, United Nations, African Union and OSCE, among others, including in Cyprus, Darfur, Mali, Ukraine and Guyana/Venezuela. Between 2014 and 2016 he was senior mediation expert to the UN Special Envoy for Syria, between 2011 and 2013 advisor to the EU Special Representative for Sudan and South Sudan, and from 2008 to 2009 to the International Civilian Representative in Kosovo. Between 2001 and 2008 Koopmans was also a barrister (advocaat) at the global law firm of Clifford Chance LLP, specializing in international litigation. In 2000 he advised Bosnia and Herzegovina at the United Nations in New York on negotiations on the Rome Statute, the treaty establishing the International Criminal Court.

Koopmans has taught peace negotiations at Leiden University and Aix-Marseille III. He speaks Dutch, English, French and German.

== Academic background and publications ==
Koopmans obtained master's degrees in law and political science at Leiden University (1997) and a Master's degree (1998) and a Doctorate (2007) at Oxford University, the latter for his thesis Diplomatic Dispute Settlement (T.M.C. Asser Press, 2008). He also studied at Sciences Po Paris (1993), Harvard University (1995) and New York University (2000).

During his time in Leiden University he was a member of Mordenate College.

== Books ==
- Diplomatic Dispute Settlement: The Use of Inter-State Conciliation (T.M.C. Asser Press, 2008).
- Negotiating Peace: A Guide to the Practice, Politics, and Law of International Mediation (Oxford University Press, 2018).
- Koopman, Dominee Generaal: nationaal belang buitenlandbeleid en de nieuwe wereldorde (Boom uitgevers Amsterdam, 2021).

== Media ==
- Gutschker, Von Thomas (26 January 2024) " Bescheiden und realistisch, aber ehrgeizig." Frankfurter Allgemeine Zeitung (in German).
- Koopmans, Sven (1 September 2022). "The EU is Israel's friend. but the occupation limits our potential". Haaretz.
- Nugali, Noor (24 August 2022). "Special interview: Abraham Accords have "not fundamentally changed Palestinians" situation,' says EU envoy". Arab News Japan.
- Brouwers, Arnout (2021-01-15). "'Koopman, Dominee, Generaal', Sven Koopmans verlaat de politiek met een pleidooi voor realisme". de Volkskrant (in Dutch).
- Boon, Floor; Alonso, Stéphane (5 December 2019). "'We zijn dan wel ethisch, maar straks zijn we ook dood'". NRC Handelsblad (in Dutch).
- van Straaten, Floris (15 February 2016). "Hoe maak je vrede: lessen van een vredesonderhandelaar". NRC Handelsblad (in Dutch).
