= Vervaecke =

Vervaecke is a surname. Notable people with the surname include:

- Félicien Vervaecke (1907–1986), Belgian cyclist
- Julien Vervaecke (1899–1940), Belgian road bicycle racer

== See also ==
- Vervaeke, a surname
