= Peter Sørensen (diplomat) =

European Union Special Representative for the Belgrade-Pristina Dialogue

Peter M. Sørensen
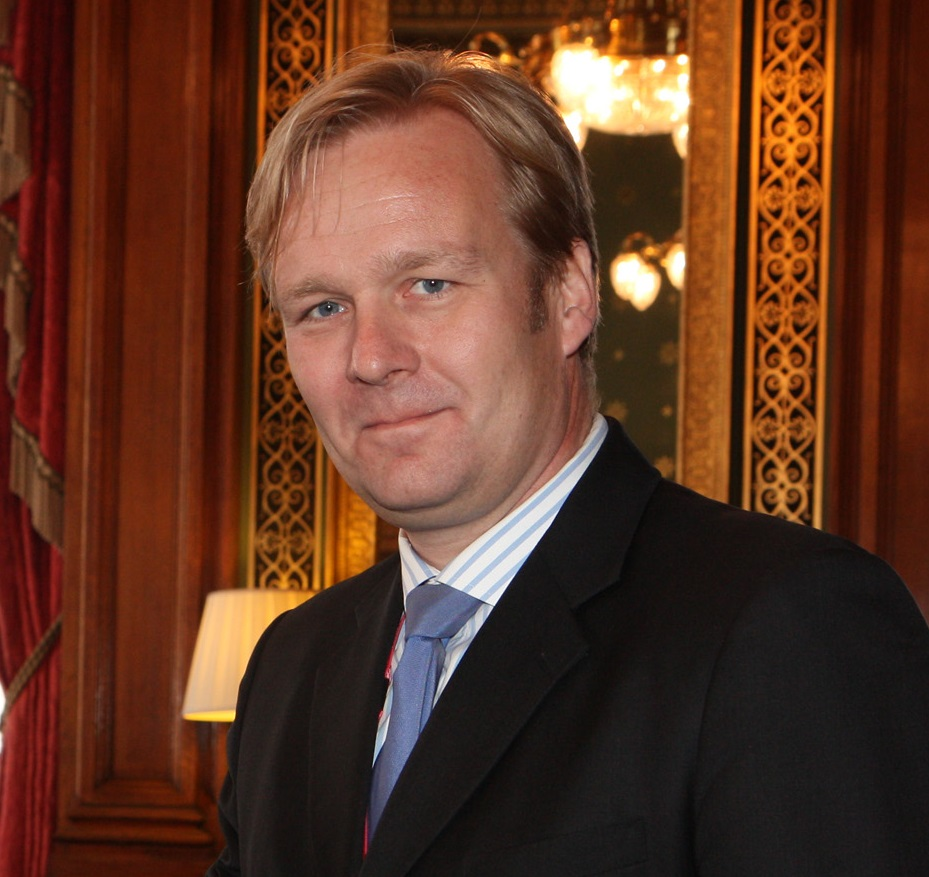

European Union Special Representative for the Belgrade-Pristina Dialogue
- In office 1 February 2025 – Was appointed by the Council of the EU the 27 January 2025.
- Preceded by: Miroslav Lajčák

European Union Special Representative for Bosnia and Herzegovina
- In office 1 September 2011 – 31 October 2014
- Succeeded by: Lars-Gunnar Wigemark

Personal details
- Born: 7 September 1967 (age 59) Denmark

Peter Ingemann Moesgaard Sørensen (born 7 September 1967) is a Danish diplomat, currently serving as the European Union Special Representative for the Belgrade-Pristina Dialogue. He has held various senior diplomatic roles within the European Union, including European Union Special Representative and Head of Delegation to Bosnia and Herzegovina, Head of the EU Delegation in Skopje, and Head of Delegation of the European Union to the United Nations Office and other International Organisations in Geneva.

== Early life and education ==
Sørensen was born in Denmark. He earned his Bachelor of Laws (1991) and Master of Law degrees (1993) from Aarhus University. Before embarking on a diplomatic career, he worked as a lawyer in Denmark and served as an officer in the Danish Army.

== Career ==
Sørensen has extensive experience in international diplomacy, particularly in the Western Balkans. His early career included various roles with international organizations operating in the region, including Senior Advisor to the UN Special Representative and Deputy Head of EU Pillar IV at UNMIK; Political Adviser to the United Nations Special Envoy for the Balkans; Head of Political Affairs in the OSCE Mission to Croatia; Legal Adviser in the Office of the High Representative in Bosnia and Herzegovina, and member of the European Community Monitor Mission in Sarajevo. Furthermore, between 2009 and 2011, Sørensen acted as the EU High Representative's Personal Representative in Belgrade. In 2011, he also served as Head of the EU Delegation in Skopje, North Macedonia, before being appointed as European Union Special Representative and Head of the EU Delegation to Bosnia and Herzegovina. after previously having served as Head of the EU Delegation in Skopje, Macedonia.

== EU Special Representative to Bosnia and Herzegovina ==
In September 2014, Sørensen was appointed EU Ambassador and Head of the EU Delegation to the United Nations Office and other International Organisations in Geneva, where he represented the EU, including at the United Nations Human Rights Council.

He later served as Principal Adviser and Special Envoy on Digital Diplomacy at the European External Action Service (EEAS).

== EU Special Representative for the Belgrade-Pristina Dialogue ==
In February 2025, Sørensen assumed the position of EU Special Representative for the Belgrade–Pristina Dialogue, succeeding Miroslav Lajčák. His mandate focuses on facilitating dialogue and overseeing the implementation of the Agreement on the Path to Normalisation between Serbia and Kosovo and its Implementation Annex adopted in early 2023.

Diplomatic posts
Preceded by Mariangela Zappia	Head of Delegation of the European Union to the United Nations Office and other International Organisations in Geneva; 2014 – present	Incumbent
Preceded by Valentin Inzko	European Union Special Representative for Bosnia and Herzegovina; 2011 – 2015	Succeeded by Lars-Gunnar Wigemark
