= Aart Koopmans =

Dutch businessman

Aart Koopmans

Aart Koopmans (12 October 1946 – 15 January 2007) was a Dutch business man, president of the Dutch winter speed skating marathon organisation and founder of the Alternative Elfstedentocht. His father, Bram Koopmans was the organiser for the Amstel Gold Race in road bicycle racing for many years.

Koopmans, born in Amsterdam, organised his first Alternative Elfstedentocht in 1975 in Finland due to the winters in the Netherlands being too warm to skate 200 km in open air on ice. In later years, the Alternative Elfstedentochten were organised in various countries like Poland, Czech Republic, Canada, Norway, Sweden and Japan. In 2007 the first Alternative Elfstedentocht in Mongolia will be held.

The Austrian editions became the most popular through the years as thousands of Dutch people travel to the Weissensee each year to compete each other in several speed skating marathons in various distances, with the 200 km Open Dutch National Championships being the main and most prestigious event. Until 2006 this gave the local authorities a profit of 36 million euros. As a result, Koopmans and co-organiser Leo van Hees (who died in 2002) were awarded with the Austrian Cross of Honour.

Since 2006 he resided in Portugal. He was scheduled to retire from his position as Alternative Elfstedentocht organiser in 2011, but was taken to a Coimbra hospital in November 2006. He suffered from bacterial infections and pneumonia, which resulted in his death on 15 January 2007.

The already scheduled Alternative Elfstedentocht of 2007 and the other scheduled races in the same period will go through, but in memorial of Aart Koopmans.
