= Koen Vervaeke =

Belgian diplomat

Koen Vervaeke (born 22 April 1959 in Wilrijk) is a Belgian diplomat who has been serving as Managing Director for Africa at the European External Action Service (EEAS) since December 2015. He was previously the Director for Horn of Africa, East & Southern Africa, Indian Ocean, and the Senior EU Coordinator for the Great Lakes region. He also served in the past as Head of the European Union Delegation to the African Union in Addis Abeba, (Ethiopia).

== Early life and education ==
Vervaeke obtained a Bachelor's degree in art history and a Master's degree in modern history at the Katholieke Universiteit Leuven, Belgium.

== Career ==
Vervaeke started his career in September 1983 in Brussels at the Cultural and Public relations department of the ASLK. In October 1987, he started working for the Belgian Ministry of Foreign Affairs. Koen Vervaeke worked for the Belgian Embassies in Tunis as First Secretary and in Bujumbura as Political Counsellor. From September 1995 until June 1999, he worked for the Belgian Permanent Representation to the United Nations in Geneva. He was the Belgian Foreign Ministry Spokesman under Louis Michel, during Belgium's EU Presidency in 2001 and Belgium's Special Envoy to the African Great Lakes Region, where he became involved in the Congo peace negotiations and the resulting Sun City Agreement.

From September 2003 until the end of 2007, Vervaeke was advisor to Javier Solana on African affairs and Head of the Africa Unit in the Council's General Secretariat. and from 2007 to 2011 he was the first European Union's ambassador as Special Representative and Head of the European Commission delegation to the African Union in Addis Abeba (Ethiopia). During his time as Special Representative, Vervaeke was also a member of the Commission on Effective Development Cooperation with Africa which was set up by the Danish Prime Minister Anders Fogh Rasmussen and held meetings between April and October 2008.

In 2011, Catherine Ashton appointed Vervaeke to the European External Action Service where he became the Director for the Horn of Africa, East and Southern Africa and the Indian Ocean. In 2015, Vervaeke was appointed by Federica Mogherini as Managing Director in charge of Africa.

== See also ==
- Foreign relations of the European Union

== Sources ==
- Appointment of Koen Vervaeke as EU Special Representative to the African Union and Head of the Commission Delegation
- Koen Vervaeke as EU Special Representative to the African Union
- Belgische diplomaat wordt ambassadeur voor Europese Unie (Dutch)
- Africa envoy
