= Francesc Vendrell i Vendrell =

Catalan diplomat (1940–2022)

Francesc Vendrell
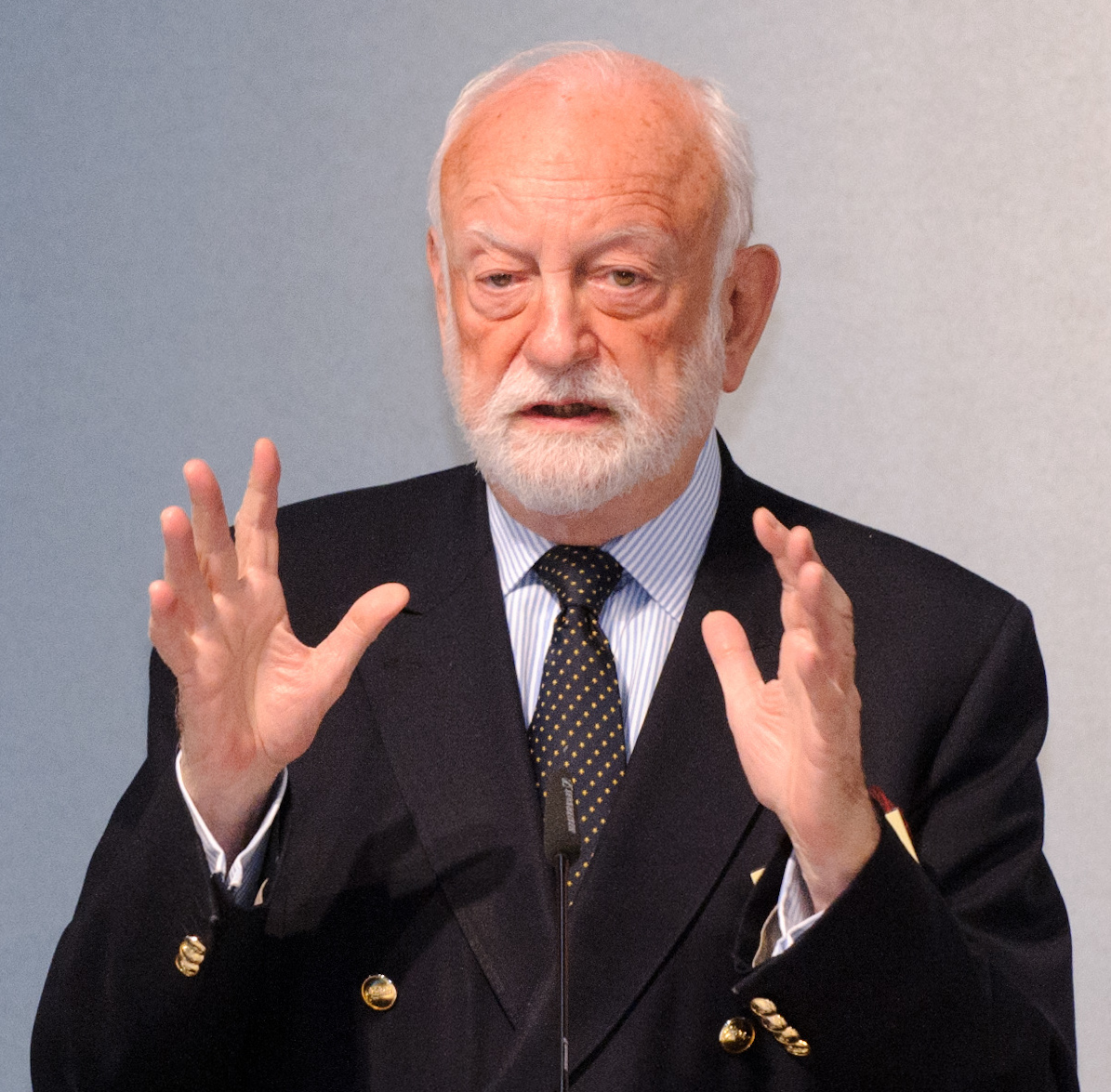
- Vendrell in 2011
- Born: 15 June 1940; Barcelona, Spain
- Died: 27 November 2022 (aged 82); London, England
- Occupation: Diplomat

Francesc Vendrell i Vendrell (15 June 1940 – 27 November 2022) was a Spanish Catalan diplomat.

== Biography ==
Vendrell got a Bachelor's degree in law at the University of Barcelona, continued studying at King's College in London and graduated in modern history at the University of Cambridge. He became director of the Academy of International Law in The Hague in 1979.

In 1968 he joined the diplomatic corps of the UN, where he was appointed head of the documentation services of the general secretariat for Europe and America from 1987 to 1992. Among other positions in the high body, he has been the personal representative of the Secretary-General of the United Nations in the peace processes of El Salvador and Nicaragua (1989–1991), Guatemala (1990–1992) and East Timor (1999). He has participated in diplomatic missions to the Caucasus (1992) and Haiti (1993), and was director of the political affairs division for East Asia and the Pacific (1993–1997) and of the combined Asia-Pacific division (1998–1999).

In 1999 he was appointed head of the UN Secretary-General's Office for Political Affairs in Asia, the Pacific, America and Europe. From 2000 to 2002, he headed the UN special mission to Afghanistan (UNSMA), and was later appointed representative of the European Union. In 2002 he received the Creu de Sant Jordi Award by the Government of Catalonia.

Between 2002 and September 2008 he was appointed by the European Union as its Special Representative for Afghanistan.

During the academic year of 2008-2009, he was visiting professor at the Woodrow Wilson School. Afterwards, he worked as an adjunct professor at the School for Advanced International Studies (SAIS), Johns Hopkins University, Bologna campus.

== Awards ==
- Creu de Sant Jordi (2002)
- Member of the Order of St. Michael and St. George
- Order of Wazir Akhbar Khan (Afghanistan)
- Honorary Doctorate, Ramon Llull University (2015)
- Ordem da Liberdade (Order of Liberty, 2019)
- Ordem de Timor-Leste (2019)
