= Andreas Reinicke =

German diplomat

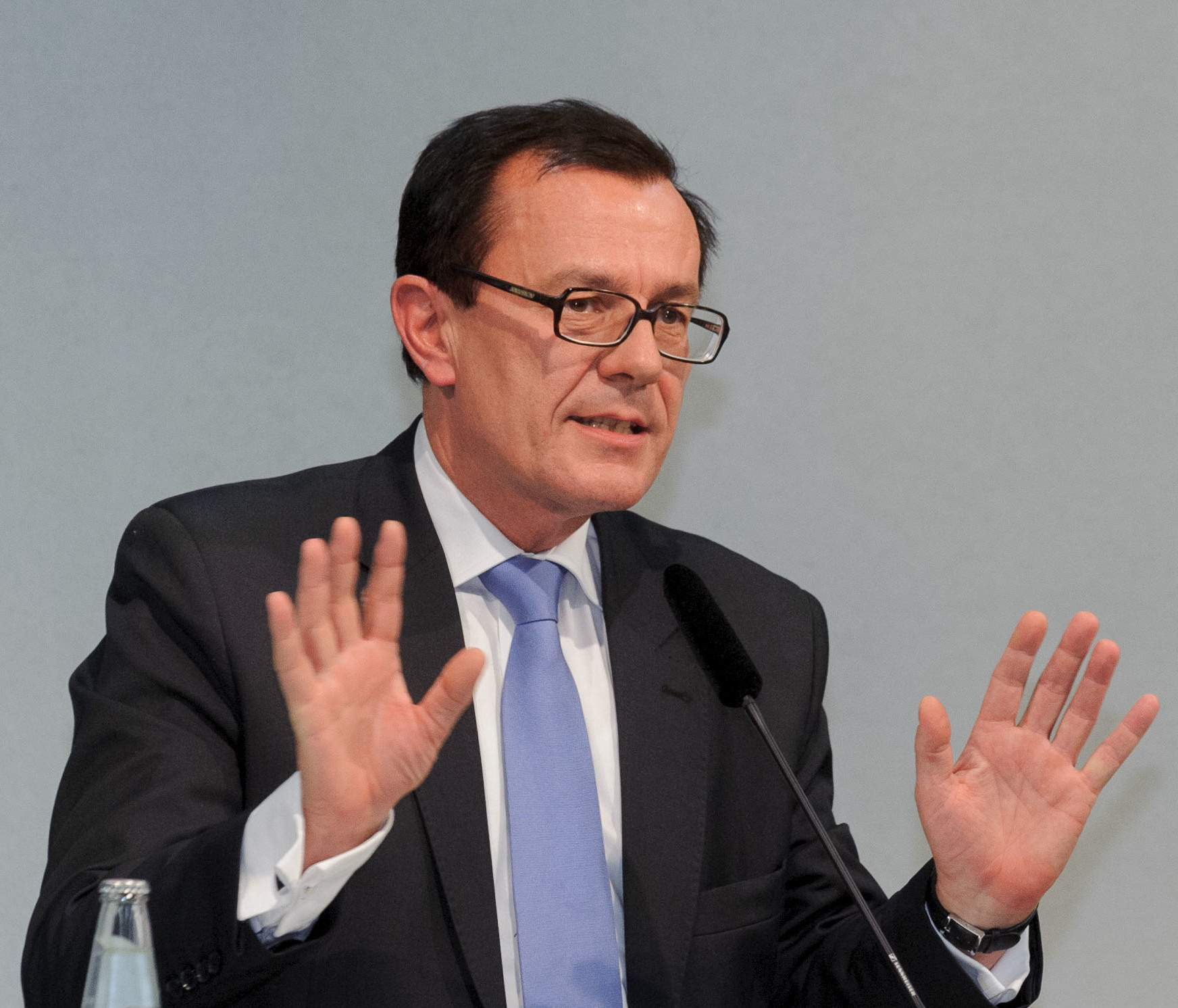
Andreas Reinicke - 13th annual foreign policy conference

Andreas Reinicke is a German diplomat and a former Ambassador to Tunisia. He has been the European Union Special Representative for the Middle East Peace Process. Alberto Oggero, an Italian diplomat, served as his deputy until 31 December 2013. Reinicke was appointed by the Council of the European Union on 23 January 2012, and his mandate was repealed on 1 January 2014, following proposals to the Political and Security Committee (PSC) by High Representative of EU for Common Foreign Affairs and Security Policy, Catherine Ashton.

Renicke's tasks and the role of EU interlocutor was assumed by Helga Schmid, deputy secretary-general for political affairs of the European diplomatic service, the EEAS. Ambassador Marc Otte of Belgium held the post of EU Special Representative for the Middle East Peace process till February 2011.

Reinicke was also the EU envoy to the Quartet on the Middle East tasked to support the work of the EU High Representative, then herself the EU Principal within the Quartet.

== Biography ==
Reinicke holds a LL.M from University of Cambridge (UK) and a Ph.D. in Law from the University of Giessen. He speaks German, English and French. He was the Ambassador of Germany to Tunisia from 2014 to 2020 and was the Ambassador of Germany to Syria from 2008 till January 2012. Prior to this assignment he held several senior posts at the German Ministry of Foreign Affairs. He was the Head of the Near East Division, the Head of the Representative Office of Germany in Ramallah. He was also posted to Tel Aviv and New York.

Reinicke's mandate was based on several EU policy objectives including: a comprehensive peace to be achieved on the basis of the relevant United Nations Security Council Resolutions, the Madrid principles, the Roadmap, the agreements previously reached by the parties and the Arab Peace Initiative; a two-State solution with Israel and a democratic, contiguous, viable, peaceful and sovereign Palestinian State living side by side within secure and recognised borders enjoying normal relations with their neighbours in accordance with UN Security Council Resolutions 242 (1967), 338 (1973), 1397 (2002) and 1402 (2002) and the Madrid principles; a solution to the Israeli-Syrian and Israeli-Lebanese conflicts; a solution to resolve the status of Jerusalem as the future capital of two states and a just, viable and agreed solution to the problem of Palestinian refugees; and following-up of the peace process towards a final status agreement and the creation of a Palestinian state including strengthening the role of the Middle East Quartet (‘the Quartet’) as guardian of the Roadmap.

In 2020, he was made a Grand officier of the Order of the Republic of Tunisia.
