= Franz-Michael Skjold Mellbin =

Danish diplomat

Franz-Michael Skjold Mellbin (born November 11, 1958) is a Danish professional foreign service officer currently serving as Ambassador of Denmark to the Philippines and Palau.

He previously served as Ambassador of Denmark to the United Arab Emirates, Qatar, Japan and Afghanistan as well as being European Union Special Representative (EUSR) for Afghanistan and Pakistan and Head of the European Union Delegation to Afghanistan.

In 2016 he facilitated the peace agreement between the Government of Afghanistan and Hezbi Islami and the return of Gulbuddin Hekmatyar.

From 2018 to 2022 Ambassador Franz-Michael Skjold Mellbin served in the United Arab Emirates and Qatar as well as being Denmark's Permanent Representative to IRENA. 2021 he was appointed Commissioner General for Denmark at Expo 2020. In 2017 he was appointed Denmark's first Ambassador and Special Representative for Freedom of Religion or Belief.

He stepped out of the Danish Ministry of Foreign Affairs from 2013 to 2017 to work at the European External Action Service as European Union Special Representative (EUSR) for Afghanistan and Pakistan and Head of the European Union Delegation to Afghanistan. On November 7, 2013, he handed over his credentials to Afghan President Hamid Karzai.

His previous term of appointment as Ambassador of Denmark to Japan began September 1, 2008 and ended September 1, 2011. He presented his credentials to the Emperor of Japan, Akihito on November 4, 2008. Franz-Michael Skjold Mellbin was Denmark's first Ambassador to Afghanistan from 2007 to 2008.

He previously served abroad in Germany, Brazil and China.

Throughout his career, Franz-Michael Skjold Mellbin has written political articles and speeches for different Danish Cabinet ministers, including the prime minister, the minister for foreign affairs, the minister for development cooperation and the minister of finance.

In 2008 Franz-Michael Skjold Mellbin was admitted into Kraks Blå Bog (Denmark's Who's Who) and in 2009 he received Japan's Cool Biz campaign award for his efforts to publicly promote energy savings and CO_{2} reductions. In 2017 Franz-Michael Skjold Mellbin was given the Ghazi Wazir Mohammad Akbar Khan Medal by Afghan President Ashraf Ghani for his exceptional role in strengthening the relations between Afghanistan and the EU. He has also received the Grand Cordon of the Order of the Rising Sun, 1.st Class, 2011, Order of the Dannebrog (R 1999; R1 2006) and the German Honour Cross in Red 1990.

After graduating as a lawyer from the University of Copenhagen in 1983 he first worked at a law firm and later at the Ministry of Taxation (Finance) before joining the Danish Foreign Service in 1985. Franz-Michael Skjold Mellbin taught human rights and constitutional law for several years at the University of Copenhagen. He has also worked as a consultant on writing and communication.

In 2011 he published the book Nu Gælder Det Danmark! together with his wife, Eva Fischer Mellbin. The book analyses modern Danish history as seen through the Danish Prime Minister's New Year's Speeches since 1940 and was well received by critics. Late 2011 he also joined the blog Copenhagen Cycle Chic on cycling. Twitter: @AmbMellbin
