= Marc Otte =

Belgian diplomat

Marc Otte (born 26 April 1947 in Brussels) is a Belgian diplomat who was the European Union's Special Representative to the Middle East peace process from 14 July 2003 until 28 February 2011. He currently serves as Director General of the Egmont Institute.

== Education and early career ==
Otte holds an MA in Political and Social Sciences, from the University of Leuven, 1969, and did post-graduate work at the university's Institute for Developing Countries. Afterwards he taught in the Democratic Republic of the Congo, where he later served in the embassy.

== Career in diplomacy ==
Over the following few decades Otte held various positions in the Belgian Foreign service, including consul general in Los Angeles (1988–1992) and ambassador to Israel (1992–96).

As of 1 March 2011, Otte's duties as EU envoy to the Middle East Quartet were covered temporarily by Helga Schmid, then deputy secretary general for political affairs of the European diplomatic service. On 23 January 2012 Andreas Reinicke was appointed as the new European Union's Special Representative for the Middle East Peace process.

In February 2020, Otte joined around fifty former European prime ministers and foreign ministers in signing an open letter published by British newspaper The Guardian to condemn U.S. President Donald Trump's Middle East peace plan, saying it would create an apartheid-like situation in occupied Palestinian territory.

== Other activities ==
- European Council on Foreign Relations (ECFR), Member
- European Institute of Peace (EIP), vice-president of the board of governors
