= Philippe Lefort =

French diplomat (born 1956)

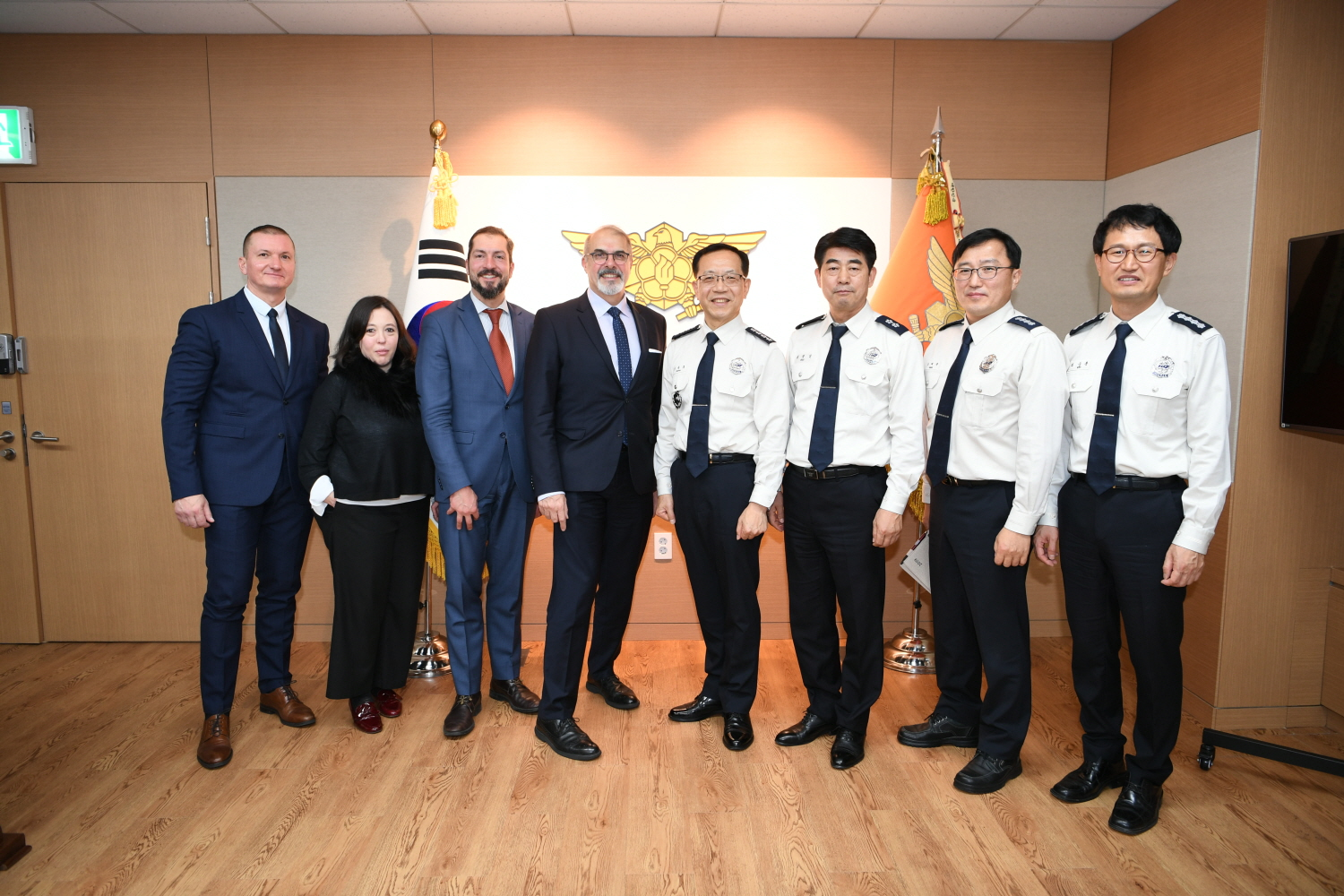
Lefort (fourth from the left) during a meeting with Republic of Korea Fire Commissioner Jung Moon-ho in 2019

Philippe Lefort (French pronunciation: [filip ləfɔʁ]; born 30 November 1956) is a French diplomat who most recently served as the French Ambassador to the Republic of Korea from 2019 to 2023. Since 2023, he has been a chargé de mission for digital affairs to the OECD Secretary-General.

A graduate of the École normale supérieure of Saint-Cloud, Lefort worked as a teacher of literature. While teaching literature, he entered the École nationale d'administration (National School of Administration) from which he graduated in 1987. He served as the French Ambassador to Georgia from 2004 to 2007, Deputy Head of Mission in Russia, European Union Special Representative for the South Caucasus and the Crisis in Georgia, as well as director of the Information Systems Bureau of the French Foreign Ministry.
