= Alex Rontos =

Alex Rontos (born 1954 in Tanganyika Territory) has been one of the closest advisors to the former prime minister of Greece Georgios Papandreou during the tenure of the latter as the Minister of Foreign Affairs (1999–2004, Simitis Regime).

Rontos was raised in present-day Tanzania and studied History at the University of Oxford (UK). He has since then worked in Africa as a reporter and presiding over an NGO named Orthodox Christian Core before settling in Athens. He has exerted a strong and controversial influence on the Greek foreign policy during the aforementioned period (1999–2004). In this vein, it should be mentioned that he has played a pivotal role regarding the change of Athens' stance towards Slobodan Milošević.

After the collapse of the Simitis government, he served as an advisor to Mikhail Saakashvili.
