= European Union Rule of Law Mission in Kosovo =

Delegation

- Formation: 16 February 2008; 18 years ago
- Headquarters: Pristina, Kosovo
- Head of Mission: Antero Lopes
- Parent organization: European Union
- Staff: Authorised strength: up to 396 Mission Members
- Website: www.eulex-kosovo.eu

The European Union Rule of Law Mission in Kosovo, known as EULEX Kosovo or simply as EULEX, (Note: From EU (English abbreviation for 'European Union') + lex (Latin for 'law').) is the largest civilian mission ever launched under the Common Security and Defence Policy (CSDP) of the European Union. EULEX supports the Kosovan rule of law institutions on their path towards increased effectiveness, sustainability, multi-ethnicity and accountability, free from political interference and in full compliance with international human rights standards and best European practices.

EULEX's current mandate covers the period to 14 June 2027 and is based on Council Decision 2025/1161. Within its mandate, the Mission undertakes monitoring, mentoring, and advising activities and has limited executive functions.

The Mission works within the framework of UN Security Council Resolution 1244.

== History ==
A 1,800 to 1,900 strong mission was approved by the European Council on 14 December 2007. This was later increased to 2,000 personnel due to the lack of an agreement with Serbia. It consisted of police officers (including four anti-riot units), prosecutors and judges, focusing on rule of law issues, including democratic standards.

The final decision on the mission was planned to be taken on 28 January 2008. This was postponed due to concerns over possible negative effects on the second round of the presidential election in Serbia on 3 February 2008 and the possible signing of the Stabilization and Association Agreement with Serbia on that date. The officially voiced reason for the postponement was the lack of a legal basis for the mission. A Joint Action was approved on 4 February 2008 and the final decision was made on 16 February 2008 (a joint action is a method of implementing the Common Foreign and Security Policy, and are binding on member states).

EULEX was therefore set up in February 2008 to support local institutions in the rule of law, right after the self-declared independence by Kosovo on 17 February 2008. After signing a five-point plan between Serbia and the UN, the UN Security Council approved the addition of EULEX as an assistance mission subjected to UNMIK, rather than outright replacing it.

The Mission included around 3,200 police and judicial personnel (1,950 international, 1,250 local), and began a four-month deployment process on 16 February 2008. In September 2012, the Kosovo Assembly voted to extend EULEX to 2014. In April 2014, the Kosovo Assembly once again voted to extend EULEX's mandate, this time until June 2016. The European Council then decided to extend the mandate of the EU Rule of Law Mission in Kosovo until 14 June 2018, before extending it again in June 2018.

EULEX's current mandate covers the period to 14 June 2027, with an allocated budget of EUR 64.5 million to cover the EULEX Kosovo mission's expenditure for the implementation of its new mandate in Kosovo.

=== Heads of Mission of EULEX ===
Head of Mission	Country	Term of office
Antero Lopes	Portugal	2026-
Emily Rakhorst, ad interim	Netherlands	2026 (Jun-Aug)
Giovanni Pietro Barbano	Italy	2023–2026
Lars-Gunnar Wigemark	Sweden	2019–2023
Alexandra Papadopoulou	Greece	2016–2019
Gabriele Meucci	Italy	2014–2016
Bernd Borchardt	Germany	2012–2014
Xavier Bout de Marnhac	France	2010–2012
Roy Reeve (acting)	UK	2010 (May–Oct)
Yves de Kermabon	France	2008–2010

=== Contributing States ===
EULEX is supported by all 27 European Union Member States, and the five Contributing States (Canada, Norway, Switzerland, Turkey and the United States).

However, some EU countries do not recognize Kosovo as an independent state. Spain for instance did not take part in the EULEX mission, since legal questions over how it replaces the UN administration have not been answered, according to the Spanish government. Furthermore, political issues related to the independence claims of the Catalonia region prevented Spain from recognizing Kosovo a self-declared independent State. In June 2008, Spanish Foreign Minister Miguel Ángel Moratinos announced in a meeting of European Union Foreign Ministers that Spain would not send its contingent to the EULEX mission until there has been a formal transfer of powers from the United Nations. The other EU countries that do not recognize the independence of Kosovo are Greece, Cyprus, Romania and Slovakia.

== Political context ==
The EU has been divided on whether to recognize an independent Kosovo without international and Serbian approval. The Stabilization and Association Agreement with Serbia was seen as ensuring the unity of the EU on the question, however the Presidency announced it would not amount to recognition of an independent Kosovo.

EULEX is legally based on United Nations Security Council Resolution 1244, which introduced the international rule of Kosovo in 1999. However, the mission, which was previously planned to be covered by the Security Council's approval of the Ahtisaari Plan, has not received a new UN Security Council mandate due to the opposition from Russia. Serbia also views the Mission as an EU recognition of an independent Kosovo.

In November 2008, the EU accepted the demand of Serbia not to implement the Ahtisaari Plan through EULEX and to be neutral regarding the status of Kosovo. In turn, EULEX would be accepted by Serbia and the UN Security Council.

=== Protests ===
On 25 August 2009, the EULEX mission was subject to violent protests, resulting in the damaging of 28 EU vehicles. Three Kosovo police officers were injured in the clashes which resulted in 21 arrests by the Kosovo police. The attack was organised by a group called Vetëvendosje ("Self-Determination") in reaction to EULEX's police cooperation with Serbia and its actions in Kosovo. There is resentment towards the EU mission for exercising its powers over Kosovo while mediating between the state and Serbia. Policies concentrating on crisis management, rather than resolution, as well as the pursuit of ethnic autonomy and its overly broad mandate over Kosovo's governance is at the stem of the discontent with the EU mission.

== Former Executive Mandate ==
Before December 2018, EULEX had an executive mandate to pursue two operational objectives: a monitoring, mentoring and advising objective, providing support to Kosovo's rule of law institutions – specifically in the police, judiciary and customs areas – and to the Belgrade-Pristina dialogue, and an executive objective, supporting the adjudication of constitutional and civil justice and prosecuting and adjudicating selected criminal cases. The mission implemented this mandate through the Strengthening Division (Monitoring, Mentoring and Advising) and the Executive Division.

=== Strengthening Division ===
The Strengthening Division (SD), in full close cooperation with other EU actors, supported Kosovo's rule of law institutions at the senior management level in their progress towards sustainability and accountability. It aimed to strengthen the chain of criminal justice, with an emphasis of fighting political interference, through monitoring mentoring and advising, including the monitoring of selected Kosovo case, such as corruption, organised crime, inter-ethnic crimes and war crimes, providing advice on the prosecution and investigation of these crimes. In addition, it provided structured support to develop the capacity and competence of the Kosovo Judicial Council and Kosovo Prosecutorial Council. It supported also the Kosovo Correctional Service with mobile capacity to focus on handling of high-profile detainees, prisons and detention centres, including the Mitrovica Detention Centre, and provided support to the Kosovo Police (KP) senior management, including a mobile capacity for police to address structural and organisational weaknesses to improve targeting of serious criminality, including terrorism, corruption, organised crime and specialised units. The Strengthening Division also assisted the Kosovo Border Police/Kosovo Customs in the implementation of the Kosovo IBM and migration strategies, including freedom of movement and IBM agreements and joint activities with FRONTEX. Finally, the SD supported the Civil Registration Agency in implementing the Belgrade-Pristina Dialogue agreements.

=== Executive Division ===
Through its Executive Division (ED), EULEX focused on delivering law services until the progress of local authorities allowed a complete transition of executive functions to them. This means that EULEX Judges and Prosecutors were embedded in Kosovo institutions and served in accordance with Kosovo law. Joint cases were investigated and prosecuted by mixed teams consisting of Kosovo prosecution authorities and EULEX prosecutors. In these cases, the Executive Division engaged in mentoring the counterpart in the form of peer-to-peer cooperation in their investigation and prosecution. EULEX dealt with highly sensitive cases related to war crimes, terrorism, organised crime and corruption. EULEX Civil Judges adjudicated property disputes and privatisation matters. In the area of privatisation matters, the mandate of EULEX Judges was restricted to cases falling within the jurisdiction of the Special Chamber of the Supreme Court of Kosovo. EULEX under its Executive objective supported the Department for Forensic Medicine by carrying out executive functions with reference to missing persons and war crimes.

== Current mandate (2025–2027) ==
Under its current mandate extended until 14 June 2027, EULEX undertakes monitoring, mentoring, and advising activities and has limited executive functions.

Through its Case Monitoring Unit, the Monitoring Pillar conducts a robust monitoring of selected cases, which covers the entire chain of criminal justice as well as civil justice cases on property and privatization issues. The Pillar also focuses its monitoring activities on selected cases which were dealt with by EULEX under its previous mandate that ended in mid-June 2018 and were later handed over to the local judiciary as well as other cases.

Through its Correctional Unit, the Monitoring Pillar also supports the Kosovo Correctional Service (KCS) in developing a professional management team through monitoring, mentoring and advising and through a continued presence in KCS facilities. The Correctional Unit also helps the KCS increase its capacities in providing rehabilitation of prisoners.

Through EULEX's Senior Police Advisors in northern Kosovo, the Monitoring Pillar advises Kosovo Police's Region North Directorate and the four police stations under its command on number of issues related to the provision of policing services.

Operational functions are undertaken by the Mission's Operations Support Pillar, which maintains a limited residual capability as a Kosovo's second security responder, where Kosovo Police is the first security responder, EULEX is the second one, and KFOR is the third security responder. EULEX also supports the Kosovo Police in the field of international police cooperation by facilitating the exchange of information between the Kosovo Police and Interpol, Europol or the Serbian Ministry of Interior. The Mission also assists the Kosovo Specialist Chambers and Specialist Prosecutor's Office by providing logistic and operational support in line with relevant Kosovo legislation. In addition, EULEX experts continue to work together with their local counterparts at the Institute of Forensic Medicine to determine the fate of missing persons by offering expertise and advice in the identification of potential clandestine graves and the exhumation and identification of victims from the Kosovo conflict. Last but not least, the Mission continues to manage its witness protection programme.

== The Specialist Chambers and Specialist Prosecutor's Office ==
In September 2011, the European Union decided to set up a Special Investigative Task Force to further the investigation into the allegations contained in the Council of Europe report of Dick Marty, in particular about alleged organ trafficking by the KLA.

In the summer of 2014, the Task Force announced that the evidence investigated was of sufficient weight to file an indictment. In order to address these allegations, there had to be an adequate institution for proper judicial proceedings, so the Kosovo authorities have agreed with the EU on modalities of dealing with those serious allegations.

On 3 August 2015, the Kosovo Assembly adopted Article 162 of the Kosovo Constitution and the Law on Specialist Chambers and Specialist Prosecutor's Office, following the Exchange of Letters between the President of Kosovo and the High Representative of the European Union for Foreign Affairs and Security Policy in 2014. The Specialist Chambers are attached to each level of the court system in Kosovo – Basic Court, Court of Appeals, Supreme Court and Constitutional Court and function according to relevant Kosovo laws as well as customary international law and international human rights law.

EULEX supports the Specialist Chambers and Specialist Prosecutor's Office with logistic and operational support in line with the relevant Kosovo legislation.

== The European Union Human Rights Review Panel (HRRP) ==
To guarantee the full transparency and accountability of EULEX, on 29 October 2009 the European Union established the Human Rights Review Panel with a mandate to review alleged human rights violations by EULEX Kosovo in the conduct of its executive mandate.

The Panel is an independent, external accountability body which performs its functions with impartiality and integrity.

The Panel reviews complaints that are submitted to it within six months from the date of the alleged violation, decides if a complaint is admissible and when admissible, it reviews the complaint and renders a finding as to whether or not EULEX has violated the human rights law applicable in Kosovo.

When the Panel determines that a violation has occurred, its findings may include non-binding recommendations for remedial action by the Head of Mission. The recommendations of the Panel and the subsequent actions by the Head of Mission with regard to the implementation of its recommendation are published in the English, Albanian and Serbian languages on the Panel's website.

== Effectiveness ==
The European Court of Auditors in a 2012 report found that EULEX assistance has not been sufficiently effective. Although the EU helped to build capacity, notably in the area of customs, assistance to the police and the judiciary has had only modest success. Levels of organised crime and corruption in Kosovo remained high. The judiciary continued to suffer from political interference, inefficiency and a lack of transparency and enforcement. There had been almost no progress in establishing the rule of law in the north of Kosovo, the 2012 report stated.

According to a February 2016 report by FOL, an accountability NGO in Kosovo, during the first 7 years of operation up until August 2015, EULEX judges delivered 47 verdicts on corruption cases and 23 verdicts on organised crime. This makes a total of 70 verdicts in these respective crimes since 2008. Numbers of convictions resulting from these verdicts was not provided to the researchers. In this period, EULEX prosecutors gained 24 indictments which amount to approximately a 6% indictment rate.

According to Andrea Capussela, a former ICO high official, from 2008 to 2013, EULEX policy was to not encroach upon the political elite's interests, or to only do so to protect its credibility; and in these cases to achieve the minimum necessary result. For war crimes, EULEX was much more successful, as these generally had less impact on current elite's criminal activities and were less likely to expose widespread criminal practices, Capussela concludes.

After the end of EULEX’s executive mandate in the judiciary, the Mission appears to have received acceptance by Kosovo. In his proposal on the steps to be taken to de-escalate the situation in north Kosovo, Prime Minister Albin Kurti pledged to provide full access and monitoring by EULEX and interested human rights NGOs of judicial proceedings in relation to perpetrators of violence.

On 9 June 2023, the President of Kosovo, Vjosa Osmani-Sadriu, awarded the Presidential Medal for Rule of Law to the Head of EULEX, Lars-Gunnar Wigemark, in recognition of his "steadfast support and cooperation in building a just and safe society in Kosovo".

== Controversy ==
The European Court of Justice ruled in 2013 that the Mission's legal status is a "mission" or "action" of the European Commission, so it does not have an independent legal standing. This meant that the Mission could not stand as defendant in relation to an application by an Italian company, Elitaliana SpA, who alleged that they had been wrongly denied a helicopter support contract the previous year.

In October 2014, British EULEX prosecutor Maria Bamieh, demanded a corruption inquiry against some of her colleagues, after she became aware that a senior civil servant at the Kosovan health ministry, held in prison after corruption charges, discussed his case with her superiors. Ms Bamieh, who claims to act as a whistleblower, cites several cases of corruption, dating back to 2012. She was suspended on 24 October.

EU High Representative Federica Mogherini said she would appoint an independent legal expert to probe Eulex.
On 24 July 2015, Parliament of Kosovo voted a resolution proposed by Vetëvendosje that obligates Kosovo President Atifete Jahjaga to ask the High Representative Mogherini to initiate investigations.

In November 2017, chief judge Malcolm Simmons resigned and accused EULEX and several senior members of corruption and malpractice. He further claimed that EULEX was subject to political interference and a political mission, rather than one to promote the rule of law. In response to the accusations, EULEX stated in November 2017 that Simmons himself had been under investigation due to serious allegations against him, which at the time had not been concluded. In a 2021 press release, the mission criticized Simmons’ statements as “a deliberate disinformation campaign” and stated that an independent investigation had not been able to confirm Simmons’ allegations.

== See also ==
- EULEX IG – EULEX's multinational police Intervention Group
- Overseas interventions of the European Union
- Kosovo status process
- Kosovo Police
- OSCE Mission in Kosovo
