= Kálmán Mizsei =

- Born: 8 June 1955 (age 71); Budapest, Hungary
- Education: Budapest University of Economics
- Occupation: Economist

Kálmán Mizsei (born June 8, 1955) is a Hungarian economist. He holds a Ph.D. in economics from Budapest University of Economics. Mizsei has held senior positions at many Hungarian and international organizations. From 2001 until 2006, he served as UNDP Regional Director for Europe and the CIS. He was the European Union Special Representative for Moldova in 2007–2011. In 2019, he joined the European Union High Level Advisers' Mission to help the Moldovan government to strengthen its reintegration policy.

Mizsei has also worked as an adjunct professor at Central European University. He was also co-chairman of the Roma Policy Board at the Open Society Institute and chairman of the Making the Most of EU Funds for the Roma. Mizsei is married and has three children.

== Career ==
Kálmán Mizsei has held positions at many Hungarian and international organizations. From 1990 until 1992, he worked as an adviser to the Governor of the National Bank of Hungary. From 1992 to 1995, Mizsei served as vice president for economic programs at the EastWest Institute in New York City. Later he worked as chairman at the Hungarian Export-Import Bank Ltd. and Hungarian Export Credit Insurance Ltd.

From 1997 till 2001, Mizsei was director of AIG Global Investment Group for Central and Eastern Europe. Between 2001 and 2006, Mizsei worked at UNDP as an assistant administrator and regional director in the rank of Assistant Secretary General of the United Nations. From 2007 until 2011, he served as a special representative of the European Union to the Republic of Moldova. In 2014, Mizsei was appointed head of the EU Advisory Mission for Civilian Security Sector Reform Ukraine (EUAM Ukraine). In 2019, he joined the European Union High Level Advisers' Mission to help the Moldovan government to strengthen its reintegration policy.

Starting from 2006, Mizsei taught classes in globalization and global governance as well as post-communist transition in Eastern Europe at Central European University. He also worked as co-chairman of the Roma Policy Board and Chairman of the Making the Most of EU Funds for the Roma at the Open Society Foundations, which is funded by George Soros.
