= Fernando Gentilini =

Italian diplomat

- Born: 2 March 1962 (age 64); Subiaco, Italy
- Education: University of Rome

Fernando Gentilini (born 2 March 1962) is an Italian diplomat.

== Early life ==
Gentilini was born in Subiaco, Italy in 1962. He graduated as a lawyer from the University of Rome in 1986.

== Diplomatic career ==
In 1990 Gentilini joined the Italian Ministry of Foreign Affairs. He served as Secretary at the Italian Embassy in Addis Ababa from July 1992 to December 1996. From December 1996 to December 1999 he served as First Secretary of the Italian mission to the European Union. In December 2002 he was appointed as director of the Unit for Western Balkans at the Italian Ministry of Foreign Affairs, a position he held until April 2004.

He also served as director for Western Europe, Western Balkans and Turkey at the European External Action Service (EEAS) and as the European Union Representative for the Middle East Peace Process.

== Publications ==
- 2011 Libero a Kabul, Editori Internazionali Riuniti, Roma, 2011, pp. 320.
- 2013 Afghan Lessons: Culture, Diplomacy, and Counterinsurgency, Brookings Institution Press, Washington, 2013, pp. 320.
- 2020 Tre volte a Gerusalemme, La Nave di Teseo, Milano, 2020, pp. 288.
- 2023 I demoni. Storie di letteratura e geopolitica, Baldini+Castoldi, Milano, pp. 360.

== See also ==
- Ministry of Foreign Affairs (Italy)
- Foreign relations of Italy
