= List of ambassadors of the European Union =

List of EU ambassadors

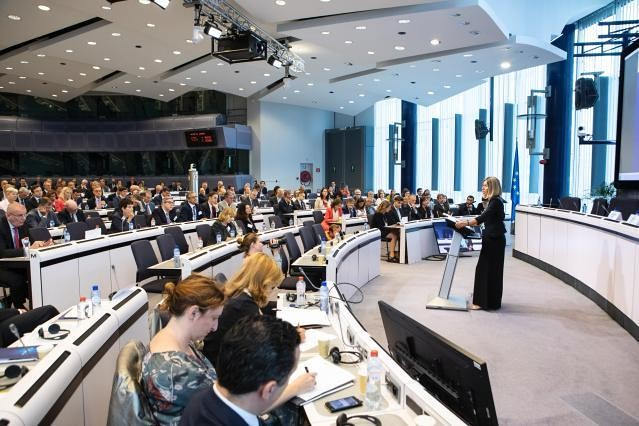
EU Ambassadors' Conference, September 2018

Below are current ambassadors of the European Union to foreign countries and international organisations. They are also known as heads of delegation or envoys. Prior to the Treaty of Lisbon, the EU was represented abroad by the ambassador of the country holding the semestrial EU council presidency, and the European Commission was represented by a head of delegation of the commission, who was a member of the diplomatic corps and given the title of ambassador as a courtesy.

Since 2010, the ambassador of the European Union, now officially accredited as ambassador extraordinary and plenipotentiary, is appointed by the president of the European Council and the president of the European Commission, following a proposal by the high representative of the Union for Foreign Affairs and Security Policy.

Ambassadors are chosen among candidates coming from the European External Action Service (EEAS), the European Commission, the European Council, and the 27 Ministries of Foreign Affairs of the member states.

== Current ambassadors ==
Ambassadors by nationality (legend →)
- Austria (4)
- Belgium (9)
- Bulgaria (1)
- Croatia (2)
- Cyprus (1)
- Czech Republic (1)
- Denmark (3)
- Estonia (2)
- Finland (6)
- France (25)
- Germany (24)
- Greece (4)
- Hungary (1)
- Ireland (4)
- Italy (15)
- Latvia (2)
- Lithuania (3)
- Luxembourg (0)
- Malta (2)
- Netherlands (2)
- Poland (5)
- Portugal (7)
- Romania (2)
- Slovakia (1)
- Slovenia (2)
- Spain (17)
- Sweden (6)

=== Ambassadors to Non-EU Countries ===
Country	Location	Ambassador	Selected	Predecessors / Comments
Afghanistan	Brussels (temporarily)	(Italy) Nicola Bellomo	2026	(Denmark) Franz-Michael Skjold Mellbin (2013–2017); (France) Pierre Mayaudon (2017–2021); (Italy) Raffaella Iodice (2022–2024), (Slovenia) Veronika Boskovic Pohar (2024 - 2026) Normally based in Kabul
Albania	Tirana	(Italy) Silvio Gonzato	2023	(Italy) Ettore Sequi (2010–2014); (Croatia) Romana Vlahutin (2014–2019); (Italy) Luigi Soreca (2019–2022); (Germany) Christiane Hohmann (2022–2023)
Algeria	Algiers	(Spain) Diego Mellado Pascua	2024	(Czech Republic) Marek Skolil (2012–2016); (Republic of Ireland) John O’Rourke (2016–2021); (Germany) Thomas Eckert (2021–2024)
Angola	Luanda	(Portugal) Rosário Bento Pais	2023	(Germany) Gordon Kricke (2012–2016); (Czech Republic) Tomáš Uličný (2016–2020); (Netherlands) Jeannette Seppen (2020–2023)
Argentina	Buenos Aires	(Denmark) Erik Høeg	2025	(Spain) Alfonso Diez-Torres (2010–2014); (Spain) José Ignacio Salafranca (2014–2017); (France) Aude Maio-Coliche (2017–2021); (Spain) Amador Sánchez Rico (2021–2025)
Armenia	Yerevan	(Greece) Vassilis Maragos	2023	(Romania) Traian Hristea (2011–2015); (Poland) Piotr Świtalski (2015–2019); (Germany) Andrea Wiktorin (2019–2023)
Australia	Canberra	(Italy) Gabriele Visentin	2022	(Italy) Sem Fabrizi (2013–2017); (Germany) Michael Pulch (2017–2022)
Azerbaijan	Baku	(Croatia) Marijana Kujundžić	2025	(Sweden) Malena Mård (2013–2017); (Lithuania) Kestutis Jankauskas (2017–2021); (Slovakia) Peter Michalko (2021–2025)
Bangladesh	Dhaka	(Republic of Ireland) / (United Kingdom) Michael Miller	2024	(Republic of Ireland) William Hanna (2010–2014); (France) Pierre Mayaudon (2014–2017); (Netherlands) Rensje Teerink (2017–2021); (Netherlands) / (United Kingdom) Charles Whiteley (2021–2024)
Barbados & the Eastern Caribbean States	Bridgetown	(Belgium) / (United Kingdom) Fiona Ramsey	2025	(Denmark) Mikael Barfod (2012–2016); (Italy) Daniela Tramacere (2016–2020); (Poland) Małgorzata Wasilewska (2020–2025) Accredited also as EU Ambassador to (Antigua and Barbuda) Antigua & Barbuda, Dominica, Grenada, (Saint Lucia) St. Lucia, (Saint Kitts and Nevis) St. Kitts & Nevis, (Saint Vincent and the Grenadines) St. Vincent & the Grenadines, the OECS and CARICOM/CARIFORUM
Belarus	Minsk	(Denmark) Steen Nørlov (acting)	2023	(Latvia) Maira Mora (2011–2015); (Germany) Andrea Joana-Maria Wiktorin (2015–2019); (Germany) Dirk Schuebel (2019–2022)
Benin	Cotonou	(Belgium) Stephane Mund	2024	(Spain) Josep Coll i Carbo (2013–2017); (Germany) Oliver Nette (2017–2019); (Germany) Sylvia Hartleif (2020–2024)
Bolivia	La Paz	(Spain) Jaume Segura Socias	2024	(United Kingdom) Tim Torlot (2012–2016); (Spain) León de la Torre Kraiss (2016–2020); (Austria) Michael Dóczy (2020–2024)
Bosnia and Herzegovina	Sarajevo	(Italy) Luigi Soreca	2024	(Denmark) Peter Sørensen (2011–2015); (Sweden) Lars-Gunnar Wigemark (2015–2019); (Austria) Johann Sattler (2019–2024) Accredited also as EU Special Representative
Botswana	Gaborone	(Finland) Petra Pereyra	2022	(Republic of Ireland) Gerard McGovern (2010–2014); (Germany) Alexander Baum (2014–2018); (Sweden) Jan Sadek (2018–2022) Accredited also as EU Ambassador to SADC
Brazil	Brasília	(Germany) Marian Schuegraf	2023	(Portugal) João Gomes Cravinho (2015–2019); (Spain) Ignacio Ybáñez (2019–2023)
Burkina Faso	Ouagadougou	(Belgium) Philippe Bronchain	2025	(France) Alain Holleville (2011–2015); (France) Jean Lamy (2015–2019); (Germany) Wolfram Vetter (2019–2023); (Spain) Daniel Aristi Gaztelumendi (2023–2025)
Burundi	Bujumbura	(Italy) Elisabetta Pietrobon	2023	(Germany) Wolfram Vetter (2016–2019); (France) Claude Bochu (2019–2023)
Cambodia	Phnom Penh	(Belgium) Igor Driesmans	2023	(France) Jean-Francois Cautain (2011–2015); (United Kingdom) George Edgar (2015–2019) (Spain) Carmen Moreno (2019–2023);
Cameroon	Yaoundé	(France) Jean-Marc Chataigner	2023	(France) Françoise Collet (2013–2017); (Germany) Hans-Peter Schadek (2017–2021); (Belgium) Philippe Van Damme (2021–2023) Accredited also as EU Ambassador to Equatorial Guinea
Canada	Ottawa	(Belgium) Geneviève Tuts	2024	(Belgium) Marie-Anne Coninsx (2013–2017); (Latvia) Peteris Ustubs (2017–2021); (Slovenia) Melita Gabrič (2021–2024)
Cape Verde	Praia	(France) Sylvie Millot	2025	(Portugal) José Manuel Pinto Teixeira (2012–2017); (Portugal) Sofia Moreira de Sousa (2017–2021); (Portugal) Carla Grijó (2021–2025)
Central African Republic	Bangui	(Spain) / (France) Diego Escalona Paturel	2024	(France) Jean-Pierre Reymondet-Commoy (2013–2017); (Italy) Samuela Isopi (2017–2021); (Belgium) / (United Kingdom) Douglas Carpenter (2021–2024)
Chad	N'Djamena	(Spain) Amador Sánchez Rico	2026	(France) Hélène Cave (2010–2015); (Romania) Denisa-Elena Ionete (2015–2018); (France) Betrand Soret (2018–2022); (Belgium) Koenraad Cornelis (2022–2024); (Poland) Przemysław Bobak (2024–2025)
Chile	Santiago	(Germany) Claudia Gintersdorfer	2024	(Spain) Rafael Dochao Moreno (2012–2016); (Greece) Stella Zervoudaki (2016–2020); (Spain) León de la Torre Krais (2020–2024)
People's Republic of China	Beijing	(Spain) Jorge Toledo	2022	(Austria) Hans Dietmar Schweisgut (2014–2018); (France) Nicolas Chapuis (2018–2022)
Colombia	Bogotá	(France) François Roudié	2025	(Spain) Patricia Llombart Cussac (2018–2021); (France) Gilles Bertrand (2021–2025)
Republic of Congo	Brazzaville	(Belgium) Anne Marchal	2024	(Netherlands) Saskia de Lang (2014–2018), (Portugal) Raul Mateus Paula (2018–2021); (Italy) Giacomo Durazzo (2021–2024)
Democratic Republic of Congo	Kinshasa	(Spain) Nicolás Berlanga Martinez	2023	(France) Jean Michel Dumond (2012–2016); (Belgium) Bart Ouvry (2017–2019); (France) Jean-Marc Chataigner (2019–2022);
Costa Rica	San José	(France) Pierre-Louis Lempereur	2021	(Spain) Pelayo Castro (2015–2019); (Spain) María Antonia Calvo (2019–2021)
Cuba	Havana	(Germany) Jens Urban	2025	(Belgium) Herman Portocarrero (2012–2017); (Spain) Alberto Navarro Gonzalez (2017–2021); (Portugal) Isabel Brilhante Pedrosa (2021–2025)
Djibouti	Djibouti	(Romania) Denisa-Elena Ionete	2024	(France) Joseph Silva (2012–2016); (Poland) Adam Kułach (2016–2020); (France) Sylvie Tabesse (2020–2024) Accredited also as EU Ambassador to IGAD
Dominican Republic	Santo Domingo	(Spain) Raúl Fuentes Milani	2025	(Spain) Alberto Navarro Gonzalez (2013–2017); (Austria) Irene Horejs (2017–2021); (Germany) Katja Afheldt (2021–2025)
Ecuador	Quito	(Latvia) Jekaterina Dorodnova	2024	(Germany) Peter Schwaiger (2012–2016); (Belgium) Marianne Van Steen (2016–2020); (Belgium) Charles-Michel Geurts (2020–2024)
Egypt	Cairo	(Netherlands) Angelina Eichhors	2024	(United Kingdom) James Moran (2012–2016); (Slovakia) Ivan Surkoš (2017–2020); (Austria) Christian Berger (2020–2024)
El Salvador	San Salvador	(Italy) Duccio Bandini	2025	(Italy) Stefano Gatto (2009–2013); (Spain) Jaume Segura Socias (2013–2017); (Spain) Andres Bassols Soldevila (2017–2021); (France) François Roudié (2021–2025) Accredited also as EU Ambassador to SICA
Eritrea	Asmara	(Malta) Johanna Darmanin	2025	(Austria) Christian R. Manahl (2014–2017); (Spain) Josep Coll i Carbo (2017–2018); (Hungary) Gábor Iklódy (2019–2022); (Italy) Gianluca Grippa (2022–2025)
Eswatini	Mbabane	(Germany) Karsten Mecklenburg	2024	(Italy) Nicola Bellomo (2014–2017); (Spain) Esmeralda Hernandez Aragones (2017–2021); (Bulgaria) Dessislava Choumelova (2021–2024)
Ethiopia	Addis Ababa	(Finland) Sofie From-Emmesberger	2024	(Belgium) Chantal Hebberecht (2013–2017); (Sweden) Johan Borgstam (2017–2021); (Belgium) Roland Kobia (2021–2024)
Fiji & the Pacific	Suva	(Germany) Barbara Plinkert	2023	(France) / (United Kingdom) Andrew Jacobs (2013–2017); (France) Julian Wilson (2017–2019); (France) Sujiro Seam (2019–2023) Accredited also as EU Ambassador to Cook Islands, Kiribati, Marshall Islands, (Federated States of Micronesia) Micronesia, Nauru, Niue, Palau, Samoa, Solomon Islands, Tonga, Tuvalu and Vanuatu, as well as French Polynesia, New Caledonia and (Wallis and Futuna) Wallis & Futuna.
Gabon	Libreville	(France) Cécile Abadie	2023	(Portugal) Cristina Martins Barreira (2011–2015); (Germany) Helmut Kulitz (2015–2019); (Portugal) Rosário Bento Pais (2019–2023) Accredited also as EU Ambassador to (São Tomé and Príncipe) Sao Tomé & Principe and ECCAS
The Gambia	Banjul	(Spain) Immaculada Roca I Cortes	2024	(Italy) Corrado Pampaloni (2021–2024); (Hungary) Attila Lajos (2015–2021); (Spain) Joaquín González–Ducay (2015–2017)
Georgia	Tbilisi	(Poland) Paweł Herczyński	2022	(Bulgaria) Philip Dimitrov (2010–2014); (Hungary) János Herman (2014–2018); (Sweden) Carl Hartzell (2018–2022)
Ghana	Accra	(Denmark) Rune Skinnebach	2025	(Belgium) Claude Maerten (2010–2014); (Republic of Ireland) William Hanna (2014–2018); (Italy) Diana Acconcia (2018–2021); (France) Irchad Ramiandrasoa Razaaly (2021–2025)
Guatemala	Guatemala City	(Finland) Johanna Karanko	2025	(Greece) Stella Zervoudaki (2011–2016); (Italy) Stefano Gatto (2016–2020); (Austria) Thomas Peyker (2020–2025)
Guinea	Conakry	(France) Xavier Sticker	2025	(Belgium) Philippe Van Damme (2010–2014); (Netherlands) Gerardus Gielen (2014–2018); (Spain) Josep Coll i Carbo (2018–2022); (Lithuania) Jolita Pons (2022–2025)
Guinea-Bissau	Bissau	(Italy) Federico Bianchi	2025	(Spain) Joaquin Gonzalez-Ducay (2011–2015); (Portugal) Victor Madeira dos Santos (2015–2019); (Portugal) Sónia Neto (2019–2022); (Latvia) Artis Bertulis (2021–2025)
Guyana	Georgetown	(Italy) Luca Pierantoni	2025	(Czech Republic) Robert Kopecky (2011–2015); (Slovenia) Jernej Videtič (2015–2019); (Spain) Fernando Ponz Cantó (2019–2022); (Netherlands) Rene van Nes (2022–2025) Accredited also as EU Ambassador to Suriname with responsibility for Aruba, Bonaire, Curaçao, (Saba (island)) Saba, (Saint Barthélemy) St Barthelemy, (Sint Eustatius) St Eustatius and (Sint Maarten) St Maarten
Haiti	Port-au-Prince	(France) Hélène Roos	2025	(Spain) Javier Niño (2012–2015); (France) Vincent Degert (2015–2019); (France) Sylvie Tabesse (2019–2022); (Italy) Stefano Gatto (2022–2025)
Holy See	Rome	(Germany) Martin Selmayr	2024	(France) Yves Gazzo (2009–2012); (France) Laurence Argimon-Pistre (2012–2016); (Poland) Jan Tombiński (2016–2020); (Netherlands) Alexandra Valkenburg (2020–2024) Accredited also as EU Ambassador to San Marino, (Sovereign Military Order of Malta) Malta Order and (United Nations) FAO
Honduras	Tegucigalpa	(Spain) Gonzalo Fournier	2024	(Netherlands) Peter Versteeg (2009–2013); (Denmark) Ketil Karlsen (2013–2017); (Italy) Alessandro Palmero (2017–2020); (Spain) Jaume Segura Socías (2020–2024)
Hong Kong	Hong Kong	(Republic of Ireland) / (United Kingdom) Harvey Rouse	2024	(Netherlands) Vincent Piket (2012–2016); (Spain) Carmen Cano (2016–2020); (Italy) Thomas Gnocchi (2020–2024) Accredited as Head of Office. Accredited also to (Macau) Macao
Iceland	Reykjavík	(Sweden) Clara Ganslandt	2024	(Germany) / (United Kingdom) Michael Mann (2017–2020); (Czech Republic) Lucie Samcová-Hall Allen (2020–2024)
India	New Delhi	(France) Hervé Delphin	2023	(Portugal) João Gomes Cravinho (2012–2015); (Poland) Tomasz Kozłowski (2015–2019); (Italy) Ugo Astuto (2019–2023) Accredited also as EU Ambassador to Bhutan
Indonesia	Jakarta	(Belgium) Denis Chaibi	2023	(United Kingdom) Julian Wilson (2008–2013); (Sweden) Olof Skoog (2014–2015); (France) Vincent Guérend (2015 - 2019); (Netherlands) Vincent Piket (2019–2023) Accredited also as EU Ambassador to Brunei
Iraq	Baghdad	(Germany) Thomas Seiler	2023	(Czech Republic) Jana Hybášková (2011–2015); (France) Patrick Simonnet (2016–2017); (Spain) Ramon Blecua (2017–2019); (Germany) Martin Huth (2019–2021); (Finland) Ville Varjola (2021–2023)
Israel	Tel Aviv	(Germany) / (United Kingdom) Michael Mann	2025	(Denmark) Lars Faaborg-Andersen (2013–2017); (Italy) Emanuele Giaufret (2017–2021); (Bulgaria) Dimiter Tzantchev (2021–2025)
Ivory Coast	Abidjan	(France) Irchad Ramiandrasoa Razaaly	2025	(Germany) Jobst von Kirchmann (2018–2022); (Italy) Francesca Di Mauro (2022–2025)
Jamaica	Kingston	(Finland) Tuija Askola	2024	(Italy) Paola Amadei (2012–2016); (Poland) Małgorzata Wasilewska (2016–2020); (Belgium) Marianne Van Steen (2020–2024) Accredited also as EU Ambassador to Belize, The Bahamas, (Turks and Caicos Islands) Turks & Caicos Islands and Cayman Islands
Japan	Tokyo	(Italy) Pier Giorgio Aliberti	2026	(Austria) Hans Dietmar Schweisgut (2010–2014); (Romania) Viorel Isticioaia Budura (2014–2018); (Germany) Patricia Flor (2018–2022)
Jordan	Amman	(Cyprus) / (France) Pierre-Christophe Chatzisavas	2023	(Poland) Joanna Wronecka (2010–2015); (Italy) Andrea Matteo Fontana (2015–2019); (Cyprus) Maria Hadjitheodosiou (2019–2023)
Kazakhstan	Nur-Sultan	(Slovenia) Aleska Simkic	2024	(France) Aurelia Bouchez (2011–2015); (Romania) Traian Hristea (2015–2018); (Sweden) Sven-Olov Carlsson (2018–2021); (Lithuania) Kestutis Jankauskas (2021–2024)
Kenya	Nairobi	(Germany) Henriette Geiger	2021	(Netherlands) Lodewijk Briët (2011–2015); (Italy) Stefano Antonio Dejak (2015–2019); (Republic of Ireland) / (United Kingdom) Simon Mordue (2019–2021) Accredited also as EU Permanent Representative to (United Nations) UNEP and (United Nations) UN-Habitat
Kosovo	Pristina	(Germany) Dirk Schübel	2026	(Slovenia) Samuel Žbogar (2011–2016); (Bulgaria) Nataiiya Apostolova (2016–2020); (Czech Republic) Tomáš Szunyog (2020–2024); (Estonia) Aivo Orav (2024–2026); (Czech Republic) Eva Palatova (Acting) (2026) Accredited as Head of Office and EU Special Representative
Kuwait	Kuwait City	(Finland) Anne Koistinen	2023	(Romania) Cristian Tudor (2019–2022)
Kyrgyzstan	Bishkek	(France) Rémi Duflot	2025	(Italy) Cesare De Montis (2013–2017); (Austria) Eduard Auer (2018–2022); (Sweden) Marilyn Josefson (2022–2025)
Laos	Vientiane	(Republic of Ireland) / (United Kingdom) Mark Gallagher	2024	(Luxembourg) Leo Faber (2016–2020); (Lithuania) Ina Marčiulionytė (2020–2024)
Lebanon	Beirut	(Belgium) Sandra De Waele	2023	(Netherlands) Angelina Eichhorst (2011–2015), (Denmark) Christina Lassen (2015–2019); (Germany) Ralph Tarraf (2019–2023)
Lesotho	Maseru	(Sweden) Mette Sunnergren	2025	(Republic of Ireland) Michael Doyle (2014–2017); (Austria) Christian Manahl (2017–2021); (Italy) Paola Amadei (2021–2025)
Liberia	Monrovia	(Belgium) Nona Deprez	2023	(Estonia) Tiina Intelmann (2014–2017); (France) Hélène Cave (2017–2020); (France) Laurent Delahousse (2020–2023)
Libya	Tripoli	(Italy) Nicola Orlando	2023	(Bulgaria) Nataliya Apostolova (2012–2016); (Germany) Bettina Muscheidt (2016–2018); (Malta) Alan Bugeja (2018–2020); (Spain) Jose Antonio Sabadell (2020–2023)
Madagascar	Antananarivo	(Belgium) Roland Kobia	2024	(Italy) Giovanni Di Girolamo (2018–2022); (France) Isabelle Delattre Burger (2022–2024) Accredited also as EU Ambassador to Comoros
Malawi	Lilongwe	(Spain) Daniel Aristi Gaztelumendi	2025	(Germany) Alexander Baum (2010–2014); (Netherlands) Marchell Germann (2014–2018); (Belgium) Sandra Paesen (2018–2020); (Denmark) Rune Skinnebach (2021–2025)
Malaysia	Kuala Lumpur	(Germany) Rafael-Tristan Daerr	2024	(Belgium) Luc Vandebon (2012–2016); (Spain) Maria Castillo Fernández (2016–2020); (Greece) Michalis Rokas (2020–2024)
Mali	Bamako	(Germany) Thomas Eckert	2024	(Germany) Richard Zink (2011–2015); (France) Alain Holleville (2015–2019); (Belgium) Bart Ouvry (2019–2023); (France) Pascal Perennec (acting) (2023–2024)
Mauritania	Nouakchott	(Spain) Joaquín Tasso Vilallonga	2024	(Spain) José Antonio Sabadell (2013–2017); (Italy) Giacomo Durazzo (2017–2021); (France) / (United Kingdom) Gwilym Jones (2021–2024)
Mauritius	Port Louis	(Austria) Oskar Benedikt	2023	(Germany) H-S. Gerstanlauer (2013–2015), (Finland) Marjaana Sall (2015–2019); (France) Vincent Degert (2019–2023) Accredited also as EU Ambassador to Seychelles
Mexico	Mexico City	(Portugal) Francisco André	2024	(Belgium) Marie-Anne Coninsx (2009–2013); (United Kingdom) Andrew Stanley (2013–2017); (Germany) Klaus Rudischhauser (2017–2019); (France) Jean-Pierre Bou (2019–2021); (France) Gautier Mignot (2021–2024)
Moldova	Chișinău	(Poland) Iwona Piórko	2025	(Finland) Pirkka Tapiola (2013–2017); (Slovakia) Peter Michalko (2017–2021); (Latvia) Jānis Mažeiks (2021–2025)
Mongolia	Ulaanbaater	(Lithuania) Ina Marčiulionytė	2024	(Romania) Traian Hristea (2018–2021); (France) Axelle Nicaise (2021–2024)
Montenegro	Podgorica	(Austria) Johann Sattler	2024	(Slovenia) Mitja Drobnic (2012–2016); (Estonia) Aivo Orav (2016–2020); (Romania) Oana-Cristina Popa (2020–2024)
Morocco	Rabat	(Bulgaria) Dimiter Tzantchev	2025	(United Kingdom) Rupert Joy (2013–2017); (Germany) Claudia Wiedey (2017–2021); (Spain) Patricia Llombart Cussac (2021–2025)
Mozambique	Maputo	(Italy) Antonino Maggiore	2022	(Republic of Ireland) Paul Malin (2011–2014); (Germany) Sven Kühn von Burgsdorff (2014–2018); (Spain) Antonio Sánchez-Benedito Gaspar (2018–2022)
Myanmar	Yangon	(Germany) Marc Fiedrich (Acting)	2025	(Belgium) Roland Kobia (2013–2017); (Denmark) Kristian Schmidt (2017–2020); (Italy) Ranieri Sabatucci (2020–2025)
Namibia	Windhoek	(Portugal) / (Germany) Ana Beatriz Martins	2023	(Spain) Raúl Fuentes Milani (2010–2015); (Czech Republic) Jana Hybášková (2015–2019); (Finland) Sinikka Antila (2019–2023)
Nepal	Kathmandu	(France) / (Spain) Veronique Lorenzo	2023	(Netherlands) Reesje Teerink (2013–2017), (Republic of Ireland) Veronica Cody (2017–2020), (Belgium) Nona Deprez (2020–2023)
New Zealand	Wellington	(Republic of Ireland) / (United Kingdom) Lawrence Meredith	2023	(Greece) Mikalis Rokas (2012–2016); (United Kingdom) Bernard Savage (2016–2019); (Germany) Nina Obermaier (2019–2023)
Nicaragua	Managua	(Spain) Fernando Ponz	2022	(Spain) Javier Sandomingo, (2011–2015); (United Kingdom) Kenneth Bell (2015–2019); (Spain) Pelayo Castro (2019–2021); (Germany) Bettina Muscheidt (2021–2022)
Niger	Niamey	(Finland) Olai Voionmaa (Acting)	2024	(Germany) Hans-Peter Schadek (2011–2013); (Portugal) Raul Mateus Paula (2013–2018); (2018–2021); (Romania) Denisa–Elena Ionete (2018–2022); (Portugal) Salvador Pinto da França (2022–2024)
Nigeria	Abuja	(France) Gautier Mignot	2024	(Belgium) Michel Arrion (2013–2017); (Denmark) Ketil Karlsen (2017–2021); (Italy) Samuela Isopi (2021–2024) Accredited also as EU Ambassador to ECOWAS
North Macedonia	Skopje	(Greece) Michalis Rokas	2024	(Estonia) Aivo Orav (2012–2016); (Slovenia) Samuel Žbogar (2016–2020); (Belgium) / (United Kingdom) David Geer (2020–2024)
Norway	Oslo	(France) Nicolas de La Grandville	2021	(United Kingdom) Helen Campbell (2013–2017); (Belgium) Thierry Béchet (2017–2021)
Pakistan	Islamabad	(Lithuania) Raimundas Karoblis	2025	(Sweden) Lars-Gunnar Wigemark (2011–2015); (France) Jean François Cautain (2015–2019), (Cyprus) Androulla Kaminara (2019–2022); (Estonia) Dr Riina Kionka (2022–2025)
Palestine	Ramallah	(Germany) Alexandre Stutzmann	2023	(Germany) Sven Kühn von Burgsdorff (2019–2023) Accredited as Head of Office. Accredited also to (United Nations) UNWRA
Panama	Panama City	(Poland) Izabela Matusz	2022	(Belgium) Chris Hoornaert (2018–2022)
Papua New Guinea	Port Moresby	(Hungary) Erika Hasznos	2025	(Greece) Ioannis Giogkarakis-Argyropoulos (2015–2019); (Slovenia) Jernej Videtič (2019–2022); (France) Jacques Fradin (2022–2025)
Paraguay	Asunción	(Germany) Katja Afheldt	2025	(Italy) Alessandro Palmero (2013–2017); (Italy) Paolo Berizzi (2017–2021); (Spain) Javier García de Viedma (2021–2025)
Peru	Lima	(Republic of Ireland) Jonathan Hatwell	2024	(Italy) Sabato Della Monica (1991–1996); (France) Jean-Michel Perille (1997–2001); (Germany) Mendel Goldstein (2001–2005); (Portugal) António Cardoso Mota (2005–2009); (Sweden) Hans Allden (2010–2013); (Austria) Irene Horejs (2013–2017); (Spain) Diego Mellado (2017–2021); (Spain) / (France) Gaspar Frontini (2021–2024)
Philippines	Manila	(Italy) Mariomassimo Santoro	2024	(France) Guy Ledoux (2011–2015); (Denmark) Franz Jessen (2015–2019); (France) Luc Véron (2019–2024)
Qatar	Doha	(Romania) Cristian Tudor	2022	None
Russia	Moscow	(France) Roland Galharague	2022	(Lithuania) Vygaudas Ušackas (2013–2017); (Germany) Markus Ederer (2017–2022)
Rwanda	Kigali	(Spain) Belén Calvo Uyarra	2022	(United Kingdom) Michael Ryan (2013–2017); (Italy) Nicola Bellomo (2017–2021)
Saudi Arabia	Riyadh	(France) Christophe Farnaud	2023	Michele Cervone d'Urso (2016–2020); (France) Patrick Simonnet (2020–2023) Accredited also as EU Ambassador to Bahrain and Oman
Senegal	Dakar	(France) / (Malta) Jean-Marc Pisani	2022	(Belgium) Dominique Dellicour (2010–2015); (Spain) Joaquín González–Ducay (2015–2018); (France) Irène Mingasson
Serbia	Belgrade	(Sweden) Andres von Beckerath	2025	(United Kingdom) Michael Davenport (2013–2017); (Italy) Sem Fabrizi (2017–2021); (Italy) / (France) Emanuele Giaufret (2021–2025)
Sierra Leone	Freetown	(Poland) Jacek Jankowski	2024	(Belgium) Tom Vens (2017–2021); (Germany) Manuel Müller (2021–2024)
Singapore	Singapore	(Latvia) Artis Bertulis	2025	(Germany) Michael Pulch (2013–2017); (Germany) Barbara Plinkert (2017–2021); (Poland) Iwona Piórko (2021–2025)
Somalia	Mugadishu	(Italy) Francesca Di Mauro	2025	(France) / (Spain) Veronique Lorenzo (2016–2018); (Spain) Nicolás Berlanga Martinez (2018–2021); (Estonia) Tiina Intelmann (2021–2023); (Sweden) Karin Johansson (2023–2025)
South Africa	Pretoria	(Netherlands) Sandra Kramer	2022	(Netherlands) Roeland van de Geer (2010–2014); (Austria) Marcus Cornaro (2014–2018); (Estonia) Dr Riina Kionka (2018–2022)
South Korea	Seoul	(Italy) Ugo Astuto	2025	(Poland) Tomasz Kozłowski (2011–2015); (Germany) Gerhard Sabathil (2015–2017); (Austria) Michael Reiterer (2017–2020); (Spain) Maria Castillo Fernandez (2020–2025)
South Sudan	Juba	(Sweden) Per Enarsson	2025	(Germany) Sven Kühn von Burgsdorff (2012–2014); (Italy) Stefano De Leo (2014–2018); (Republic of Ireland) Sinéad Walsh (2018–2020); (Germany) Christian Bader (2020–2022); (Finland) Timo Olkkonen (2022–2025)
Sudan	Kampala (temporarily)	(Germany) Wolfram Vetter (Acting)	2025	(Czech Republic) Tomáš Uličný (2011–2016); (France) Jean Michel Dumond (2016–2019); (Netherlands) Robert van den Dool (2019–2022); (Republic of Ireland) Aidan O'Hara (2022–2025) Normally based in Khartoum
Sri Lanka	Colombo	(Spain) Carmen Moreno	2023	(Republic of Ireland) David Daly (2013–2016); (Luxembourg) Tung–Lai Margue (2016–2019); (Belgium) Denis Chaibi (2019–2023) Accredited also as EU Ambassador to Maldives
Switzerland	Bern	(Germany) Andreas Künne	2025	(United Kingdom) Richard Jones (2012–2016); (Denmark) Michael Matthiessen (2016–2020); (Greece) / (Belgium) Petros Mavromichalis (2020–2025) Accredited also as EU Ambassador to Liechtenstein
Syria	Beirut (temporarily)	(Germany) Michael Ohnmacht (acting)	2024	(Denmark) Simon Bojsen-Moller – acting (2016–2017); (Italy) Tosca Barucco – acting (2017–2019); (France) Gilles Bertrand – acting (2019–2021); (Romania) Dan Stoenescu – acting (2021–2024) Normally based in Damascus
Taiwan	Taipei	(Germany) Lutz Güllner	2024	(France) Frédéric Laplanche (2011–2015); (Sweden) Madeleine Majorenko (2015–2019); (Poland) Filip Grzegorzewski (2019–2024) Accredited as Head of Office
Tajikistan	Dushanbe	(Poland) Radosław Darski	2025	(Austria) Eduard Auer (2010–2014); (Croatia) Hidajet Biščević (2014–2018); (Sweden) Marilyn Josefsson (2018–2022); (Lithuania) Raimundas Karoblis (2022–2025)
Tanzania	Dar es Salaam	(Germany) Christine Grau	2023	(Italy) Filiberto Ceriani Sebregondi (2011–2015); (Netherlands) Roeland van de Geer (2015–2018); (Italy) Manfredo Fanti (2019–2023) Accredited also as EU Ambassador to EAC
Thailand	Bangkok	(Italy) Luisa Ragher	2025	(Spain) Jesús Miguel Sanz Escorihuel (2013–2017); (Finland) Pirkka Tapiola (2017–2021); (Republic of Ireland) David Daly (2021–2025)
Timor-Leste	Dili	(Germany) Thorsten Bargfrede	2025	(Portugal) Alexandre Leitão (2016–2019); (France) / (United Kingdom) Andrew Jacobs (2019–2022); (Germany) Marc Fiedrich (2022–2025)
Togo	Lomé	(France) / (United Kingdom) Gwilym Jones	2024	(Portugal) Maria Cristina Martins Barreira (2017–2020); (Spain) Joaquín Tasso Vilallonga (2020–2024)
(Trinidad and Tobago) Trinidad & Tobago	Port of Spain	(France) Cécile Tassin-Pelzer	2025	(Italy) Daniela Tramacere (2012–2016); (Netherlands) Arend Biesebroek (2016–2020); (Republic of Ireland) Peter Cavendish (2021–2025)
Tunisia	Tunis	(Italy) Giuseppe Perrone	2024	(Spain) Laura Baeza (2012–2016); (France) Patrice Bergamini (2016–2020); (Austria) Marcus Cornaro (2020–2024)
Turkey	Ankara	(Lithuania) Jurgis Vilčinskas (acting)	2025	(France) Jean-Maurice Ripert (2011–2013); (Germany) Hansjörg Haber (2015–2016); (Austria) Christian Berger (2016–2020); (Germany) Nikolaus Meyer-Landrut (2020–2024) (Germany) Thomas Hans Ossowski (2024–2025)
Turkmenistan	Ashgabat	(Poland) Beata Pęksa	2023	(Spain) Diego Ruiz Alonso (2020–2023)
Uganda	Kampala	(Sweden) Jan Sadek	2022	(Denmark) Kristian Schmidt (2013–2017); (Italy) Attilio Pacifici (2017–2022)
Ukraine	Kyiv	(Slovakia) Katarína Mathernová	2023	(Poland) Jan Tombiński (2012–2016); (France) Hugues Mingarelli (2016–2019); (Estonia) Matti Maasikas (2019–2023)
United Arab Emirates	Abu Dhabi	(Czech Republic) Lucie Berger	2023	(Romania) Mihail Stuparu (2012–2014), (Italy) Patrizio Fondi (2015–2020); (Italy) Andrea Matteo Fontana (2020–2023)
United Kingdom	London	(Spain) Pedro Serrano	2022	(Portugal) João Vale de Almeida (2020–2022) Member state of the European Union (1973–2020)
United States	Washington, D.C.	(Lithuania) Jovita Neliupšienė	2023	(Portugal) João Vale de Almeida (2010–2014); (Republic of Ireland) David O'Sullivan (2014–2019); (Greece) Stavros Lambrinidis (2019–2023)
Uruguay	Montevideo	(Greece) / (Belgium) Petros Mavromichalis	2025	(Spain) Juan Fernández Trigo (2013–2017); (Germany) Karl-Otto Koenig (2017–2021); (Italy) Paolo Berizzi (2021–2025)
Uzbekistan	Tashkent	(Estonia) Toivo Klaar	2024	(Bulgaria) Yuri Sterk (2012–2016); (Denmark) Charlotte Adriaen (2020–2024)
Venezuela	Caracas	(Spain) María Antonia Calvo (acting)	2024	(France) Aude Maio-Coliche (2013–2017); (Portugal) Isabel Brilhante Pedrosa (2017–2021); (France) Rachel Roumet – acting (2021–2024)
Vietnam	Hanoi	(France) Julien Guerrier	2023	(Belgium) Bruno Angelet (2015–2019); (Italy) Pier Giorgio Aliberti (2019–2023)
Yemen	Amman (temporarily)	(France) Patrick Simonnet	2025	(Spain) María Antonia Calvo (2016–2019); (Sweden) Hans Grundberg (2019–2021); (Spain) Gabriel Munuera Vinlas (2021–2025) Normally based in Sanaa
Zambia	Lusaka	(Poland) Karolina Stasiak	2023	(France) Gilles Hervio (2010–2015); (Italy) Alessandro Mariani (2015–2019); (Poland) Jacek Jankowski (2019–2023)
Zimbabwe	Harare	(Germany) Katrin Hagemann	2025	(Belgium) Philippe Van Damme (2014–2018); (Finland) Timo Olkkonen (2018–2022); (Germany) Jobst von Kirchmann (2022–2025)

The European Union has not established diplomatic relations with Iran and North Korea.

=== Ambassadors to International Organisations ===
Host organisation	Location	Ambassador	Selected	Predecessors / Comments
African Union	Addis Ababa	(Spain) Javier Niño Pérez	2024	(United Kingdom) Gary Quince (2011–2015), (Italy) Ranieri Sabatucci (2015–2019); (Denmark) Birgitte Markussen (2019–2023)
ASEAN	Jakarta	(France) Sujiro Seam	2023	(Belgium) Igor Driesmans (2021–2023)
Council of Europe	Strasbourg	(Croatia) Vesna Batistić Kos	2022	(Italy) Luisella Pavan-Woolfe (2009–2014) (Finland) Jari Vilen (2014–2018); (Bulgaria) Meglena Kuneva (2018–2022)
OSCE	Vienna	(Austria) Rasa Ostrauskaite	2020	(France) Didier Lenoir (2015–2019) Deputy Head of Delegation in Vienna
United Nations	New York City	(Greece) Stavros Lambrinidis	2024	(Portugal) João Vale de Almeida (2015–2019); (Austria) Thomas Mayr-Harting (2011–2015); (Sweden) Olof Skoog (2019–2023)
United Nations	Geneva	(Germany) Deike Potzel	2025	(Italy) Maria Angela Zappia (2011–2014), (Belgium) Walter Stevens (2018–2021); (Denmark) Lotte Knudsen (2021–2025)
United Nations	Vienna	(Sweden) Carl Hallergård	2023	(Austria) Stephan Klement (2017–2023) Head of Delegation in Vienna
(United Nations) OECD & UNESCO	Paris	(Austria) Christina Kokkinakis	2023	(Italy) Maria Francesca Spatolisano (2012–2019), (France) Didier Lenoir (2019–2023) Accredited also as EU Ambassador to Andorra and Monaco
(United Nations) FAO	Rome	(Germany) Martin Selmayr	2024	(Poland) Jan Tombiński (2016–2020), (Netherlands) Alexandra Valkenburg (2020–2024) Accredited also as EU Ambassador to Holy See, Sovereign Military Order of Malta and San Marino
World Trade Organization	Geneva	(Portugal) João Aguiar Machado	2019	(Greece) Angelos Pangratis (2011–2015), (Belgium) Mark Vanheukelen (2015–2019)

=== Ambassadors at now Defunct Offices ===
Country	Location	Ambassador	Selected	Predecessors / Comments
Solomon Islands	Honiara	(Greece) Leonidas Tazapsidis	2014–2018	Closed in 2018. Accredited also as EU Ambassador to Vanuatu

== See also ==
- Accreditation and Responsibilities of EU delegations
- European External Action Service
- European Union and the United Nations
- European Union Special Representative
- Foreign relations of the European Union
- List of diplomatic missions of the European Union
