= Brilhante =

Brilhante is a surname. Notable people with the surname include:

- Alfredo Brilhante da Costa (1904–1980), Brazilian footballer
- Carlos Alberto Brilhante Ustra (1932–2015), Brazilian army colonel and politician
- Isabel Brilhante Pedrosa (born 1964), Portuguese diplomat
- Robson José Brilhante Martins (born 1998), Brazilian footballer

== Other uses ==
- Brilhante (TV series), a 1981 Brazilian telenovela
- Brilhante F.C., a 2011 Brazilian teen drama series
- Brilhante River, a river in southwestern Brazil
