= Tomasz =

Tomasz is a Polish given name, the equivalent of Thomas in English.

Notable people with the given name include:

- Tomasz Adamek (born 1976), Polish heavyweight boxer
- Tomasz Arciszewski (1877–1955), Polish socialist politician and Prime Minister of the Polish government-in-exile in London (1944–1947)
- Tomasz Bajerski (born 1975), Polish motorcycle speedway rider who won the Team Polish Champion title in 2001
- Tomasz Bednarek (born 1981), Polish tennis player
- Tomasz Beksiński (1958–1999), Polish radio presenter, music journalist and movie translator
- Tomasz Chrzanowski (born 1980), Polish motorcycle speedway rider who has been a member of the Poland national team
- Tomasz Fornal (born 1997), Polish volleyball player, member of Poland men's national volleyball team and silver medallist at the 2022 World Championships
- Tomasz Frankowski (born 1974), Polish footballer (senior career from 1991)
- Tomasz Gapiński (born 1982), Polish international motorcycle speedway rider who has won Team Polish Champion titles in 1999 and 2006
- Tomasz Gollob (born 1971), Polish motorcycle speedway rider who has appeared in every Speedway Grand Prix series since the inaugural 1995 season
- Tomasz Górski (canoeist), Polish sprint canoer who won a bronze medal in the K-2 1000 m event at the 2006 Szeged World Championships
- Tomasz Górski (politician) (born 1973), Polish politician
- Tomasz Jędrzejak (born 1979), Polish motorcycle speedway rider who is a member of Poland national speedway team
- Tomasz Kasprzik (born 1993), Polish footballer (senior career from 2009)
- Tomasz Klon (born 1986), German politician
- Tomasz Kot (born 1977), Polish actor
- Tomasz Kozłowski (born 1958), Polish diplomat
- Tomasz Kuszczak (born 1982), Polish footballer (senior career from 2000)
- Tomasz Lipiec (born 1971), Polish race walker and former Minister of Sport
- Tomasz Majewski (born 1981), Polish Olympic gold medalist in the shot put event
- Tomasz Narkun, Polish mixed martial arts fighter
- Tomasz Radziński (born 1973), Canadian soccer player (senior career from 1990)
- Tomasz Schafernaker (born 1979), Polish-British meteorologist.
- Tomasz Sikora (born 1973), Polish Winter Olympics silver medallist and World and European Championship gold medallist in the biathlon
- Tomasz Skublak (born 1997), Canadian soccer player
- Tomasz Stańko (1942–2018), Polish musician and composer
- Tomasz Strzembosz (1930–2004), Polish historian and writer who specialized in the history of Poland during World War II
- Tomasz Wicherkiewicz (born 1967), Polish linguist
- Tomasz Wiktorowski (born 1981), Polish tennis coach
- Tomasz Wylenzek (born 1983), Polish-born German Olympic and World Champion gold medallist in sprint canoe events
