= Horejš =

Horejš (feminine: Horejšová) is a Czech surname. The surname originated from the comparative adjective hořejší ('upper', here meaning "the one who is located/living in an upper place") and used to distinguish namesakes. The opposite are the surnames Dolejš and Dolejší. Notable people with the surname include:

- David Horejš (born 1977), Czech football player and manager
- Josef Horejs (1898–?), Austrian footballer
- Irene Horejs, Austrian diplomat

== See also ==
- Jindřich Hořejší (1886–1941), Czech poet and translator
