= Irchad Razaaly =

French diplomat

Irchad Ramiandrasoa Razaaly
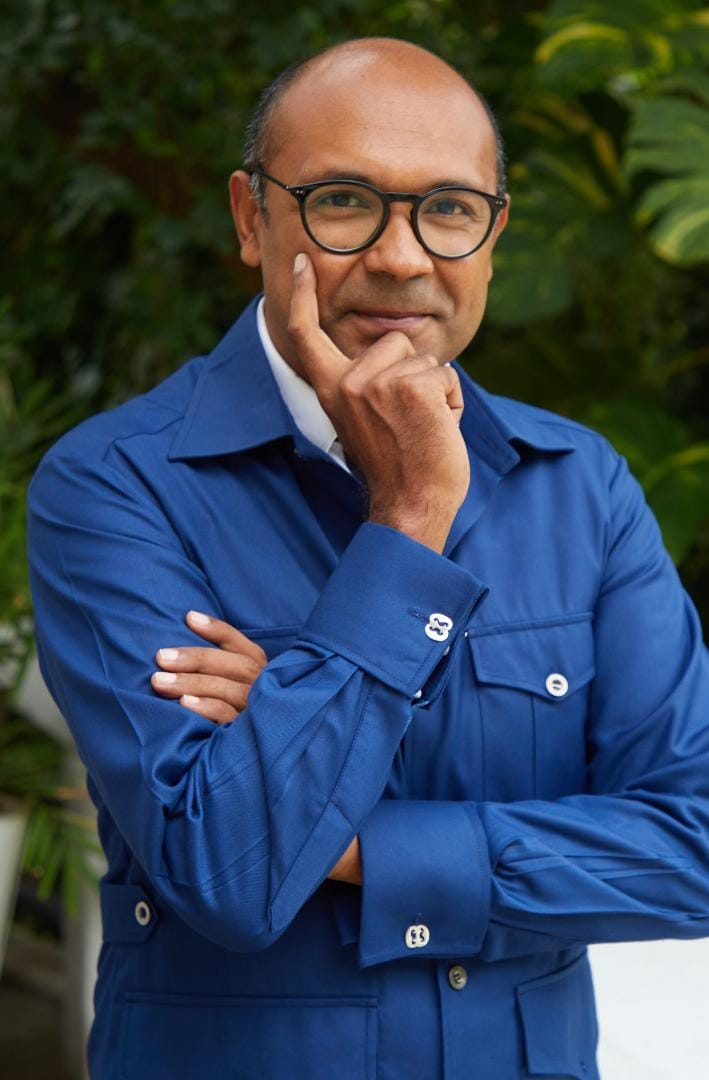

Ambassador of the European Union to Ivory Coast
- Incumbent
- Assumed office 1 September 2025
- Preceded by: Francesca Di Mauro

Amassador of the European Union to Ghana
- In office 1 September 2021 – 31 August 2025
- Preceded by: Diana Acconcia
- Succeeded by: Rune Skinnebach

Personal details
- Born: 30 May 1976 (age 50) Antananarivo, Madagascar
- Education: Lycée Français de Tananarive, Collège Saint-Michel, Université d’Antananarivo, Sorbonne University.
- Profession: Diplomat
- Website: www.eeas.europa.eu

Irchad Ramiandrasoa Razaaly (born 30 May 1976) is a French career diplomat. He is the Ambassador of the European Union to Ivory Coast since September 2025. He served as the Ambassador of the European Union to Ghana from 2021 to 2025.

== Early life and education ==
Irchad was born in Antananarivo. He grew up in Madagascar and studied in Lycée Français de Tananarive and Collège Saint-Michel. He got a master's degree from the Université d’Antananarivo in 1997 before pursuing his studies in France where he got a master's degree in Strategic Studies in 1998 and International Relations in 1999 at the Sorbonne University.

== Career ==
He started a short stint in the French Ministry of Defence and then joined the French Ministry of Europe and Foreign Affairs in the Africa Directorate. After being the diplomatic advisor to the Deputy Minister of Foreign Affairs he was appointed to the French Embassy in the Republic South Africa from 2005 to 2009. He joined the private office of the European Commissioner in charge of development cooperation in 2011. Irchad served as the manager of the Bêkou Trust Fund for Central African Republic from 2014 to 2017 before he was placed in charge of the coordination of European Union's relations with the 16 countries of West Africa in the European diplomatic service between 2017 and 2021. On 1 September 2021, he was appointed Ambassador of the European Union to Ghana.

On 1 September 2022, Irchad Razaaly announced Daniel Boifio Junior as his manager following his first anniversary celebrations.

== Hobbies ==
He writes short stories which are published in the annual Lettres de Lémurie. He is interested in Ghanaian and African philosophy and practices kickboxing since he arrived in Accra.

Irchad was seen in a viral video with Anne Sophie Avé taking part in the TikTok viral challenge for Down Flat, a song by Kelvyn Boy. He has also stated Gasmilla as his all time Ghanaian artist.

== See also ==
- List of ambassadors of the European Union
