= Aivo Orav =

Estonian diplomat (born 1965)

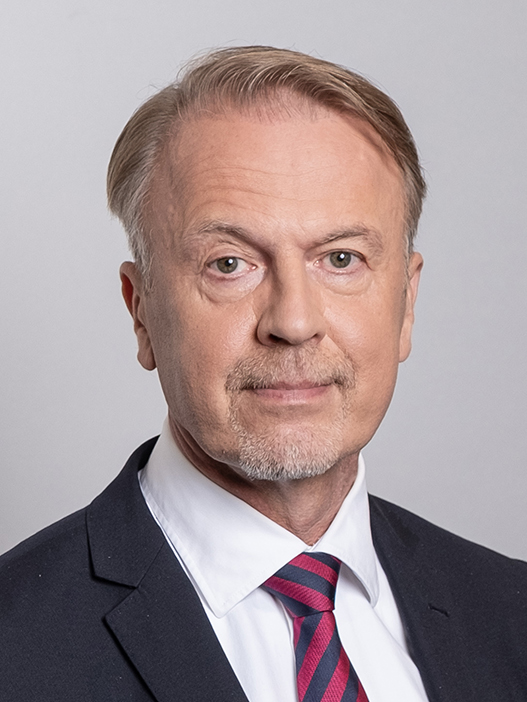
- Orav in 2024

Permanent Representation of Estonia to OSCE
- In office 1995–1998

Security Policy Director of the Ministry of Foreign Affairs
- In office 1998–2000

Ambassador of Estonia to Poland
- In office 2000–2005
- Succeeded by: Ants Froch

Estonian Ambassador to Turkey with co-accreditation to Azerbaijan, Lebanon and Macedonia
- In office 2008–2012
- Succeeded by: Annely Kolk

E.U Ambassador to North Macedonia
- In office 2012–2016

E.U Ambassador to Montenegro
- In office 2016–2020

E.U Ambassador to Kosovo
- In office 2024–2026
- Preceded by: Tomáš Szunyog

Personal details
- Born: Aivo Orav; 10 April 1965 (age 61) Pärnu, then part of Estonian SSR, Soviet Union
- Occupation: Diplomat

Aivo Orav (born 10 April 1965 in Pärnu) is an Estonian diplomat. Orav is the European Union (EU) Ambassador to Türkiye since April 1, 2026. Orav was EU Ambassador and EU Special Representative to Kosovo 2024-2026. From 2020 to 2024, Orav was the Permanent Representative of Estonia to the EU. Before that, Orav has been the Head of EU Delegation in Montenegro and Head of EU Delegation in North Macedonia, and Ambassador of Estonia in several countries.

== Education ==
Orav graduated from the Faculty of Physics and Chemistry of the University of Tartu (1990) and later from the Estonian Diplomatic School in Tallinn (1992).

Since 1992, Orav served the Ministry of Foreign Affairs.

From 1995 to 1998, Orav was the Permanent Representation of Estonia at the OSCE in Vienna.

From 1998 to 2000, Orav was Security Policy Director of the Ministry of Foreign Affairs.

From 2000 to 2005, Orav was the Ambassador of Estonia in Poland with co-accreditation to Bulgaria and Romania. Since 2005, Orav is the non-resident ambassador in North Macedonia.

After the end of his term in Poland in August 2005, Orav returned to Estonia, where he worked as the Political Director of the Ministry of Foreign Affairs.

2008–2012 Orav was the Estonian Ambassador to Turkey with co-accreditation to Azerbaijan, Lebanon and Macedonia.

2012 Orav joined the E.U. External Action Service and worked as E.U Ambassador to North Macedonia until 2016 and then as EU Ambassador to Montenegro 2016–2020.

Orav was Estonian Permanent Representative to the European Union from September 2020 to August 2024.

Orav was EU Ambassador and EU Special Representative to Kosovo 2024-2026.

Since April 1, 2026 is Orav EU Ambassador to Türkiye.

== Diplomatic posts ==
1992-1995 Desk Officer, International Organizations, MFA of Estonia

1995-1998 Second Secretary, Permanent Mission of Estonia to the CSCE, Vienna

- 1998-2000 Security Policy Director, Ministry of Foreign Affairs of Estonia
- 2000–2005 Ambassador of Estonia to Poland
- 2005–2012 Ambassador of Estonia to the Republic of North Macedonia (residing in Poland, Estonia, Turkey)
- 2005-2008 Political Director, Ministry of Foreign Affairs of Estonia
- 2008–2012 Ambassador of Estonia to Turkey
- 2012–2016 EU Ambassador to the Republic of North Macedonia
- 2016–2020 EU Ambassador to Montenegro
- 2020 –2024 Ambassador of Estonia, Permanent Representative (Permanent Representation of Estonia to the EU)
- 2024 - 2026 EU Ambassador/ EU Special Representative to Kosovo.
- Since April 1, 2026 is Orav EU Ambassador to Türkiye.

== Awards ==
- 2002: Commander's Cross with Star of the Order of Merit of the Republic of Poland
- 2005: Order of the White Star, IV class.
- 2005: Order of The Madara Horseman, 1st Class, Bulgaria
- 2020: The Honorary Silver Medal of Jan Masaryk, Czech Republic
- 2022: Cross of Merit of the Ministry of Foreign Affairs of Estonia, 2nd Class
- 2023: The Silver Honorary Decoration of the Ministry of Interior of Estonia
- 2023: Cross of Merit of the Ministry of Defence of Estonia, 3rd class
- 2024: Order of the National Coat of Arms, 3rd class, Estonia
