= Reiterer =

Reiterer is a surname. Notable people with the surname include:

- Max Reiterer (1904–?), Austrian footballer
- Michael Reiterer (born 1954), Austrian diplomat
- Werner Reiterer (born 1968), Austrian-born Australian discus thrower and shot putter
