= Radosław Darski =

Polish diplomat

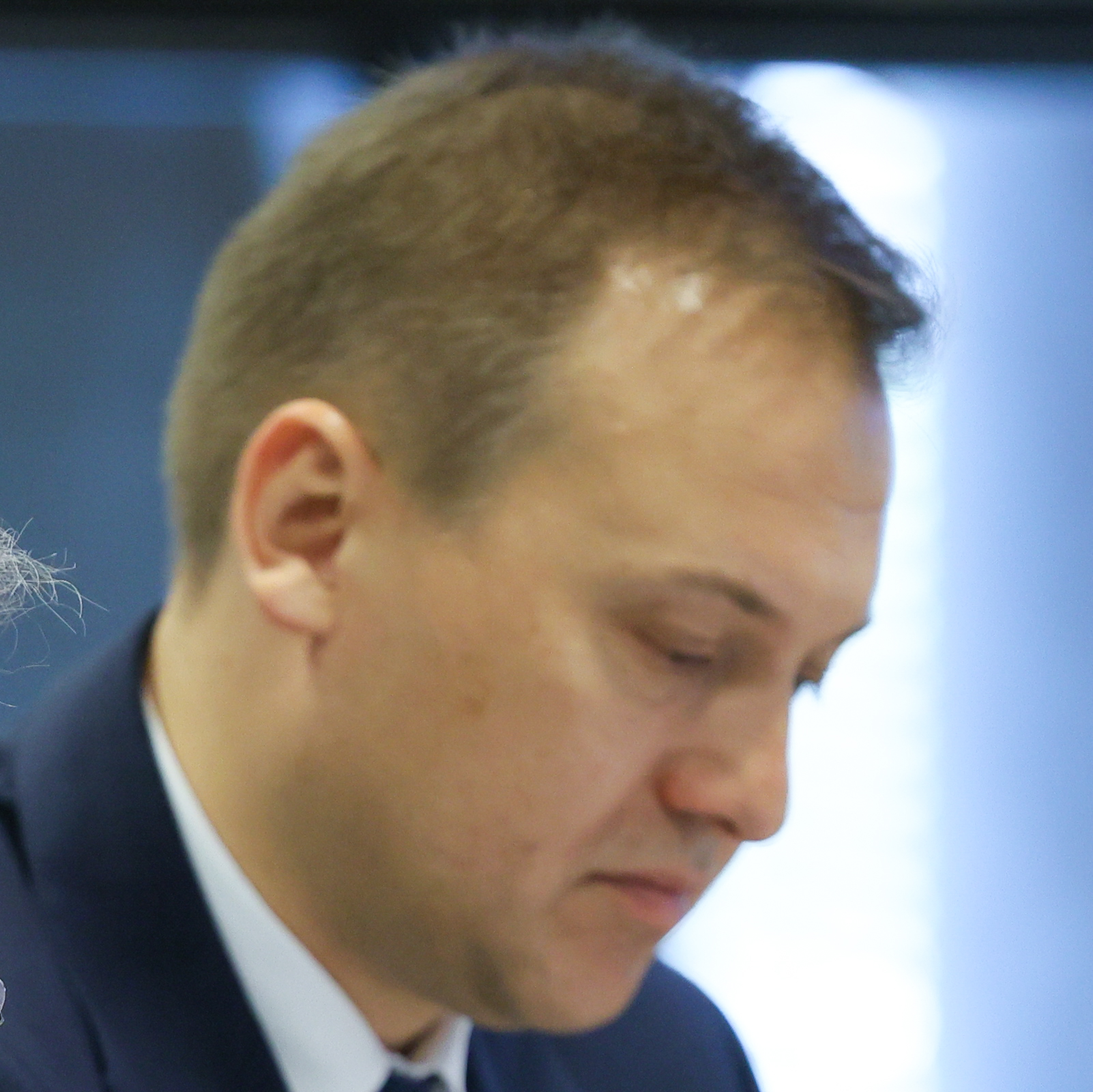
- Radosław Darski (2025)

European Union Ambassador to Tajikistan
- Incumbent
- Assumed office 5 September 2025
- Preceded by: Raimundas Karoblis

Personal details
- Education: University of Wrocław
- Profession: Official, diplomat

Radosław Darski is a Polish official and diplomat, since 2025 serving as the European Union Ambassador to Tajikistan.

== Life ==
Darski graduated from Political Science with a focus on International Relations at the University of Wrocław (M.A.).

He began his professional career at the Ministry of Foreign Affairs. He served there as deputy director of the Eastern Department responsible for relations with Central Asian countries, the South Caucasus and the Eastern Partnership, as well as deputy director of the European Policy Department, where he oversaw policy towards the Western Balkans, Turkey, the South Caucasus and the Eastern Partnership. He was Deputy Head of Mission at the Polish Embassy in Minsk. As part of his work in the European External Action Service, he held managerial positions in delegations in Tashkent and Tbilisi. On 5 September 2025, he began his mission as European Union Ambassador to Tajikistan.

Besides his native Polish, he speaks English and Russian.
