= Izabela Matusz =

Polish diplomat

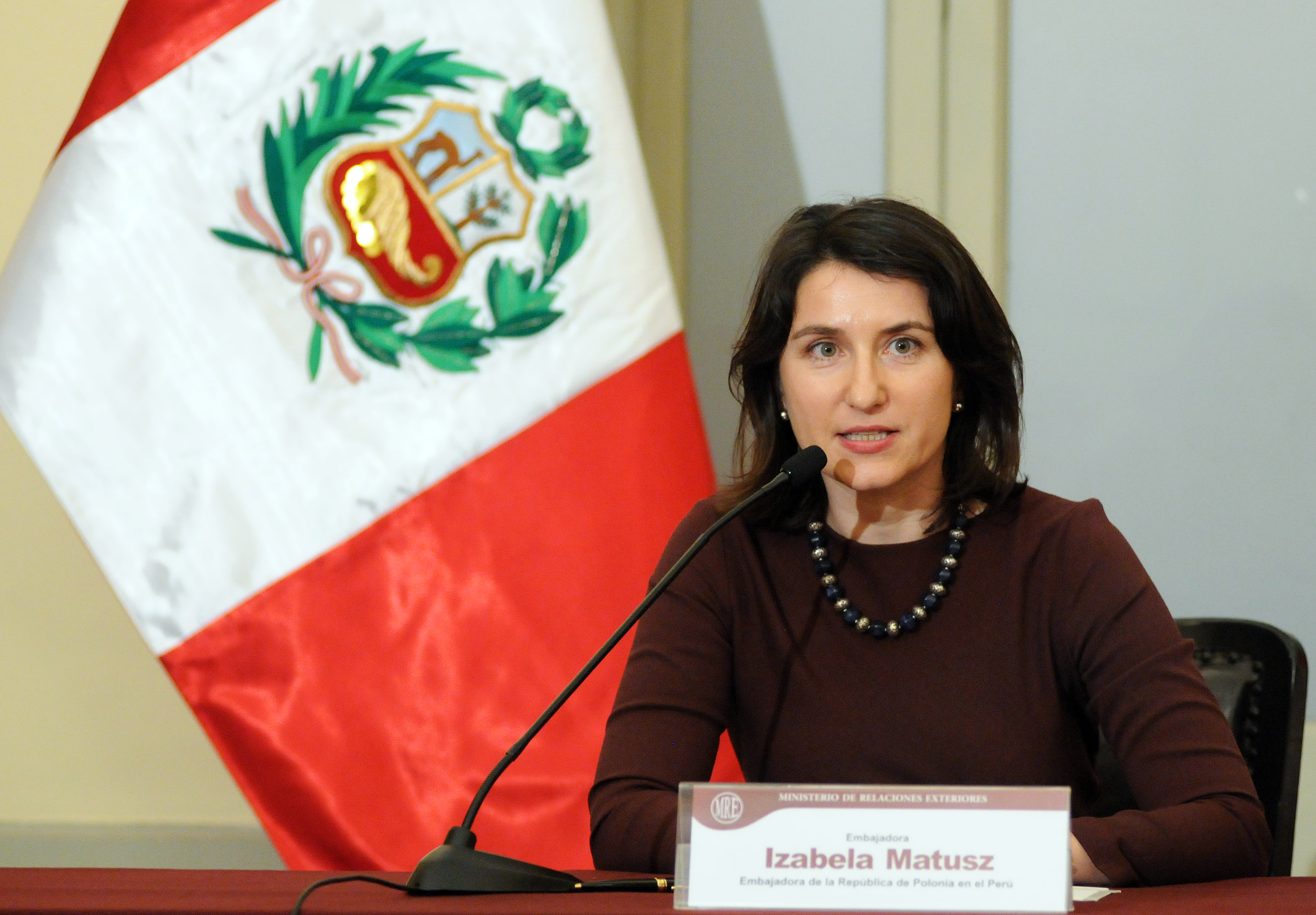

Ambassador of Poland to Peru
- In office 2013–2017
- Preceded by: Jarosław Spyra
- Succeeded by: Magdalena Śniadecka-Kotarska

Personal details
- Born: 1974 (age 51–52) Warsaw
- Education: Warsaw School of Economics
- Profession: Diplomat

Izabela Matusz (born 1974, in Warsaw) is a Polish diplomat; since 2022 she is serving as the European Union Ambassador to Panama. Prior to that, she was Ambassador of Poland to Peru (2013–2017).

== Biography ==
Matusz graduated from international economic relations at the SGH Warsaw School of Economics. She has been studying also at the University of Warsaw Center of Latin American Studies.

In 2002, she joined the Ministry of Foreign Affairs of Poland, Department of the Americas, being responsible for relations with Mercosur states. Between 2005 and 2009, she was posted at the embassy in Buenos Aires, Argentina, serving also as chargé d'affaires. From 2009 to 2013, she was back at the Department of the Americas, as desk officer for EU-Latin America and the Caribbean relations She was taking part in negotiating EU trade agreement with Colombia and Peru. On 24 December 2012 she was nominated ambassador to Peru, additionally accredited to Bolivia and Ecuador. She began officially her term on 19 March 2013, and finished it on 15 December 2017. Later, she joined the European External Action Service and, in September 2022, she took the post of the European Union Ambassador to Panama, replacing Chris Hoornaert.

Besides Polish, Matusz speaks English, Spanish, French, and Russian.
