= Michael Reiterer =

Austrian diplomat and professor (born 1954)

Michael Reiterer Ph.D.
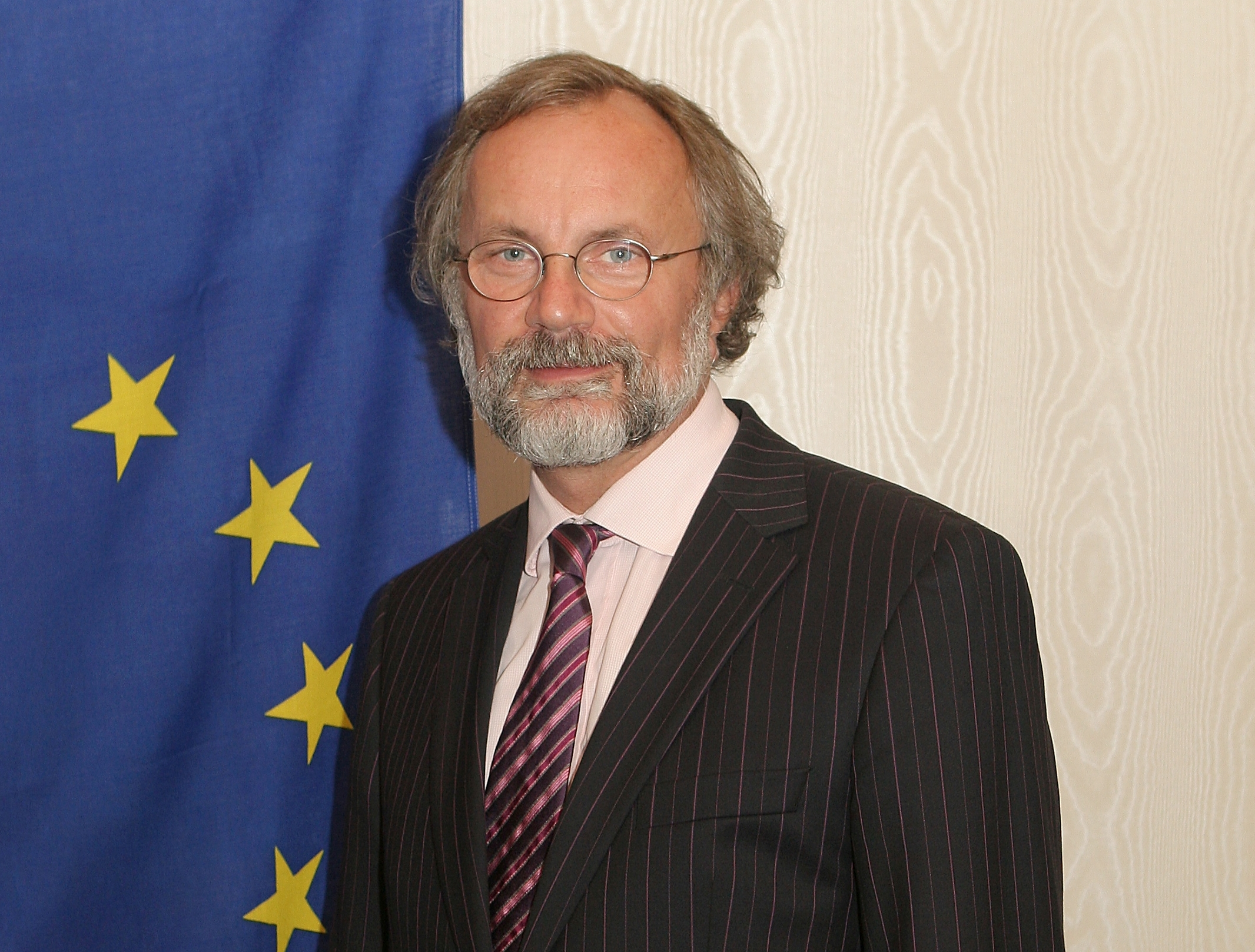

European Union Ambassador to Switzerland
- In office 2007–2011
- Succeeded by: Richard Jones

3rd European Union Ambassador to South Korea
- Incumbent
- Assumed office 2017
- Succeeded by: Gerhard Sabathil

Personal details
- Born: September 29, 1954 (age 72) Innsbruck, Austria
- Education: University of Innsbruck; Graduate Institute of International Studies
- Profession: Diplomat

Michael Reiterer (Innsbruck, 29 September 1954), member of the European External Action Service (EEAS) EU diplomatic service was the Ambassador of the European Union to the Republic of Korea. He was also a professor of international politics at Vrije Universiteit Brussel.

== Academic career ==
Michael Reiterer studied law at the University of Innsbruck from where graduated in 1978 as doctor juris (Dr. jur.). Subsequently, he obtained post graduate diplomas in international relations from the Johns Hopkins University, School of Advanced International Studies, Bologna Center (1979) and the Graduate Institute of International Studies (HEI) in Geneva (1985). In 2005 he was appointed adjunct professor (‘Dozent’) for international politics at the university of Innsbruck, Austria; time permitting he teaches at various international universities and publishes on EU-foreign policy, EU-Asia relations with particular focus on Northeast Asia, inter-regionalism, ASEM, human rights and cultural diplomacy cf.list of publications He is a frequent speaker at international conferences and interacts with think tanks. Memberships include Corresponding member of the Program Committee of the European Forum Alpbach, Consultative Council of the Vienna Institute for Economic Studies; Academic Consultative Council of the University of Kobe.

== Austrian diplomatic service ==
Michael Reiterer held positions at the Missions of Austria to the European Union (1997–1998) and the GATT (1990–1992) and negotiated in the GATT Uruguay Round. He was co-chair trade of the OECD Joint Experts Group of trade and environment experts. He served on the GATT Panel Split-run editions Canada-US. He was also Deputy Austrian Trade Commissioner to West Africa with seat in Abidjan/Côte d'Ivoire (1982–1985) and Japan (1985–1988); 1992–1997 he served as Deputy Director General for European Integration Policy of the Federal Economic Chamber of Austria; 1997/1998 he was a member of the European Social and Economic Committee.

== EU diplomatic service ==
Having joined the European foreign service in 1998 as Counselor for ASEM (1998–2002), he served as Minister/Deputy Head of the EC Delegation to Japan (2002–2006), EU-Ambassador to Switzerland and the Principality of Liechtenstein (2007–2011) and Principal Adviser to the managing director for the Asia Pacific of the European External Action Service (2012–2016). Since February 2017 he serves as Ambassador of the European Union to the Republic of Korea.

== Bibliography ==
- "About the EU Delegation to the Republic of Korea". eeas.europa.eu. Archived from the original on 2019-04-28.
- "Externe Lehrende – Universität Innsbruck". 2017-10-16. Archived from the original on 2017-10-16.
