= Dolejš =

Dolejš (feminine: Dolejšová) is a Czech surname. The surname (and similar surnames like Dolejší) originated from the comparative adjective dolejší ('lower', here meaning "the one who is located/living in a lower place") and used to distinguish namesakes. The opposite is the surname Horejš. Notable people with the surname include:

- Daniel Dolejš (1994), Czech ice hockey player
- Jiří Dolejš (born 1961), Czech politician
- Vladimír Dolejš (born 1950), Czech sprint canoer
