= Representation of the European Commission in Germany =

Coordinates: 52.5169°N 13.3801°E

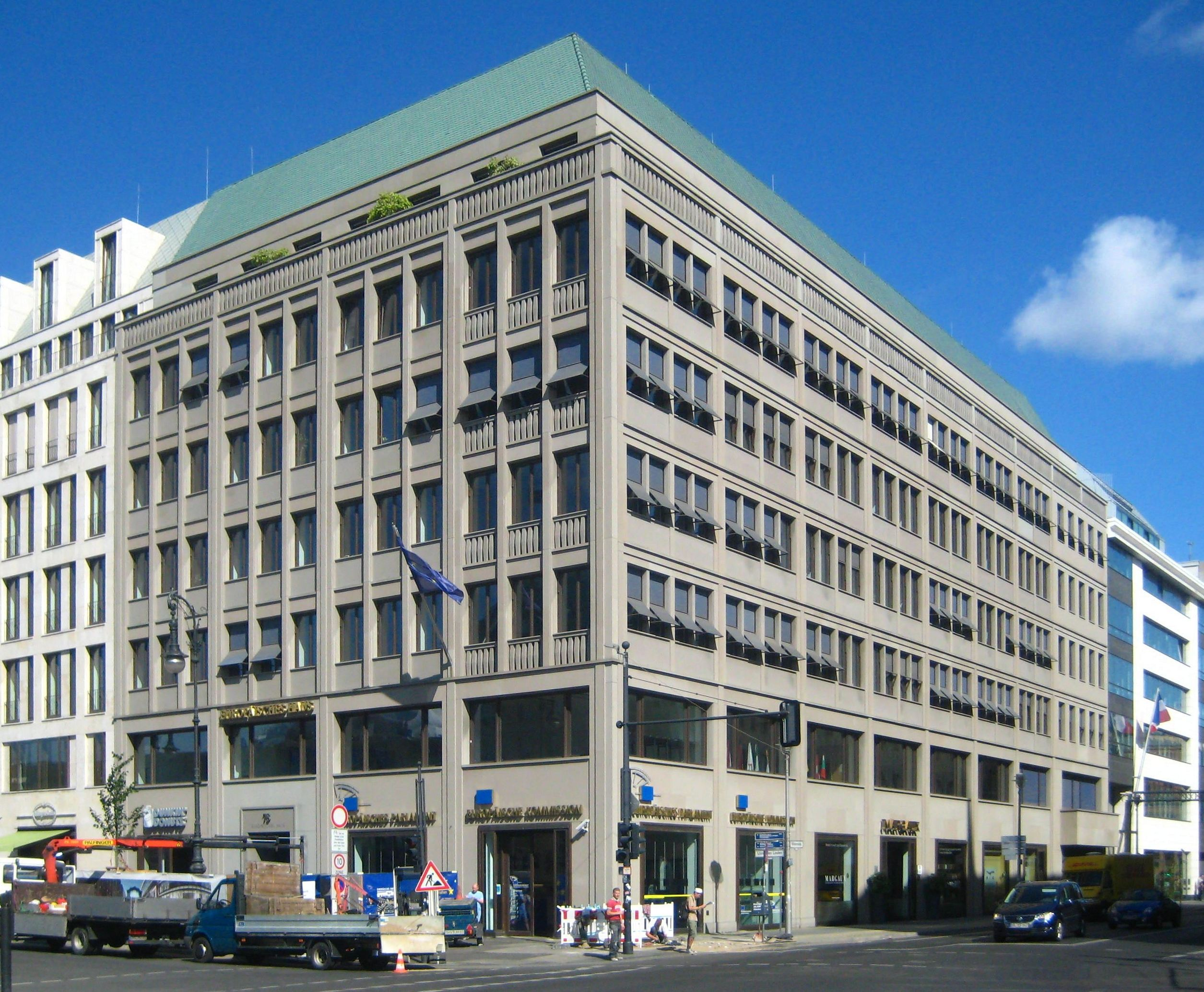
Europäisches Haus Berlin, Unter den Linden at Brandenburger Tor

The Representation of the European Commission in Germany is a representation of the European Commission with the head office located in Berlin. There are two more regional representation offices in Bonn and Munich.

== History ==
The representation of the European Commission started as a press liaison office of the European Coal and Steel Community in 1951 in Bonn. It was the first press liaison office followed by offices in Rome and Paris. The main task of the press liaison office was to maintain and strengthen contact to the press and other national sources of information. After the establishment of the European Economic Community and the European Atomic Energy Community in 1957, the office became responsible for representing their interests as well. In 1989 the range of tasks was further extended and was renamed into Representation of the European Commission. Due to the Decision on the Capital of Germany the head office of the representation was moved from Bonn to Berlin.

== Function ==
The representation serves as a link between the national government, the public and the European Commission in Brussels. It informs the public and the media about the policies of the Commission and maintains contact to the federal and national parliaments. At the same time, it informs the office in Brussels about the political situation in Germany and informs about the demands from Germany.

== Headquarter of the Representation in Berlin ==
=== Tasks ===
The head office of the representation is located in Haus der Europäischen Union in Berlin, where the information office of the European Parliament and Erlebnis Europa are located. The representation office in Berlin maintains contact to the German Bundestag, Bundesrat of Germany and Cabinet of Germany, operating actively in press work and communicates with the public. It is regionally responsible for ten federal states: Berlin, Brandenburg, Bremen, Hamburg, Mecklenburg-Western Pomerania, Lower Saxony, Saxony, Saxony-Anhalt, Schleswig-Holstein, Thuringia.

=== Head of the Representation ===
The Head of the Representation in Germany is Barbara Gessler.

Predecessors were:

- Patrick Lobis (acting Head of Representation September 2023 - March 2024)
- Jörg Wojahn (September 2019 - August 2023)
- Richard Kühnel (June 2014 - August 2019)
- Marie-Thérèse Duffy-Häusler (Oktober 2013 – June 2014)
- Matthias Petschke (2009–2013), today director for european satellite navigation programme in the General-Directorate of the European Commission for Industry and Entrepreneurship
- Gerhard Sabathil (2004–2008), today director of European External Action Service
- Axel R. Bunz (1993–2003)
- Gerd Langguth (1988–1993)

=== Political Department ===
The political department is responsible for the communication between the Commission and the political decision-makers in Germany. In addition, it compiles reports and analysis about the political, economical and social trends, as well as, special events in Germany. Vice versa, it disseminates the European policy by presentations and events for the public and experts. Head of the department is Manica Hauptmann.

=== Department for Communication ===
The department for communication informs the citizens about what is happening and why on the European level. For that it cooperates closely with partners from the civil society, federal and regional government. Head of the department is Dina Behnke.

=== Press Department ===
The press department informs journalists in Germany about the policies of the Commission, answers questions and issues statements. Tools are a daily Email newsletter with important messages for Germany from the Commission, a weekly schedule preview and a two-weekly brochure.

Head of the department is Birgit Schmeitzner.

== Regional Representation in Bonn ==
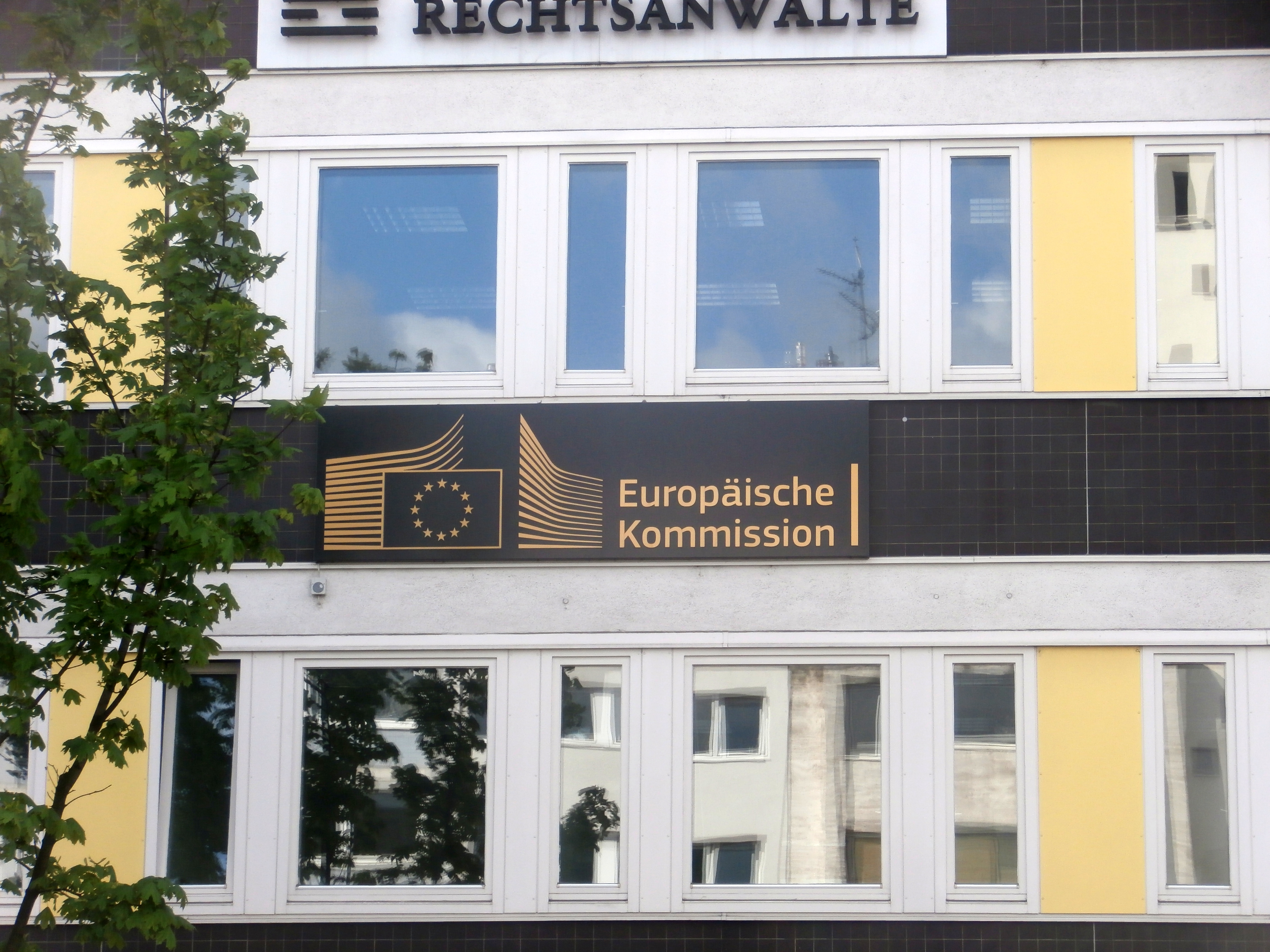
Regional representation of the European Commission in Bonn(2014)

The regional representation of the European Commission in Bonn is located in the former headquarter of the representation of the Commission, which moved to Berlin in 1999. It serves as a link between the Commission in Brussel and the four federal states North Rhine-Westphalia, Hessen, Rhineland Palatinate and Saarland. Stefan Lock is in charge of the office.

=== Information service ===
The information service answers questions about all Europe related topics and supplies information material. In addition, it has a lot of information about the Regional policy of the European Union.

=== Events ===
The regional representation organises many events on its own or with co-operation partners in North Rhine-Westphalia, Hessen, Rhineland Palatinate and Saarland.

== Regional Representation in Munich ==
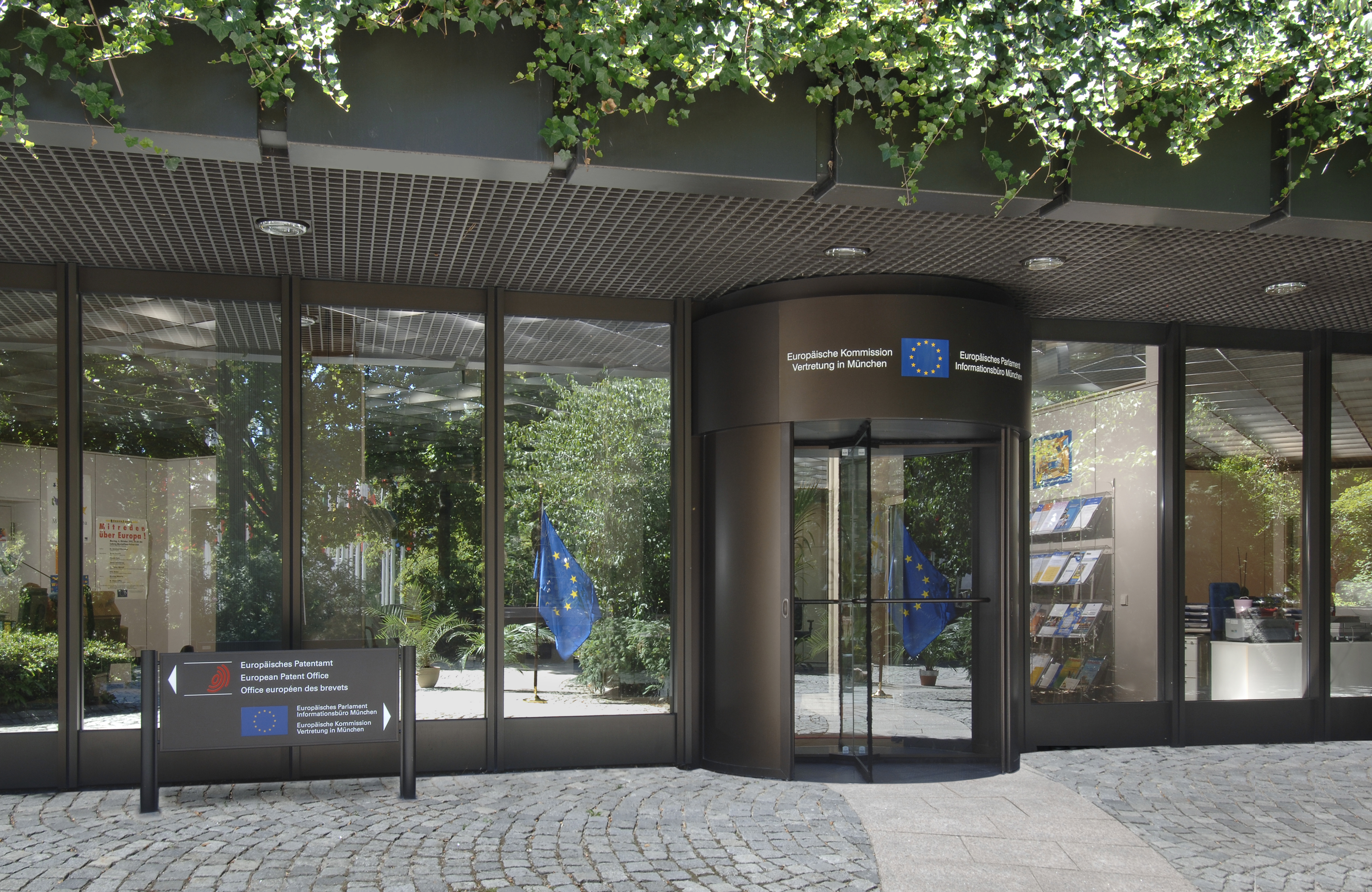
Regional Representation of the European Commission in Munich

The regional representation in Munich covers the federal states of Bavaria and Baden-Württemberg. The head of the office is Wolfgang Buecherl.

=== Citizen service ===
The department for citizen service provides interested citizen, journalists and school with information and materials.

=== Events ===
The regional representation office organises many events in Baden-Württemberg and Bavaria.

== Regional information and advise services ==
=== EUROPE DIRECT ===
In Germany there are 50 EUROPE DIRECT centers. EUROPE DIRECTS form the local link between the citizen and the European Union. EUROPE DIRECTS are co-financed from the Budget of the European Union and has the purpose to help, inform and answer questions from the local public about the European Union. The representation office in Munich co-ordinate their work and supply materials and training for the staff.

=== European Documentation Centre ===
The 27 European Documentation Centres in Germany promote teaching and research of questions about the European integration. They are located close to higher education institutions and research facilities and ensure that documents and publications are available for teaching and research.
