= Michael Dóczy =

Austrian diplomat and current ambassador of the EU to Bolivia

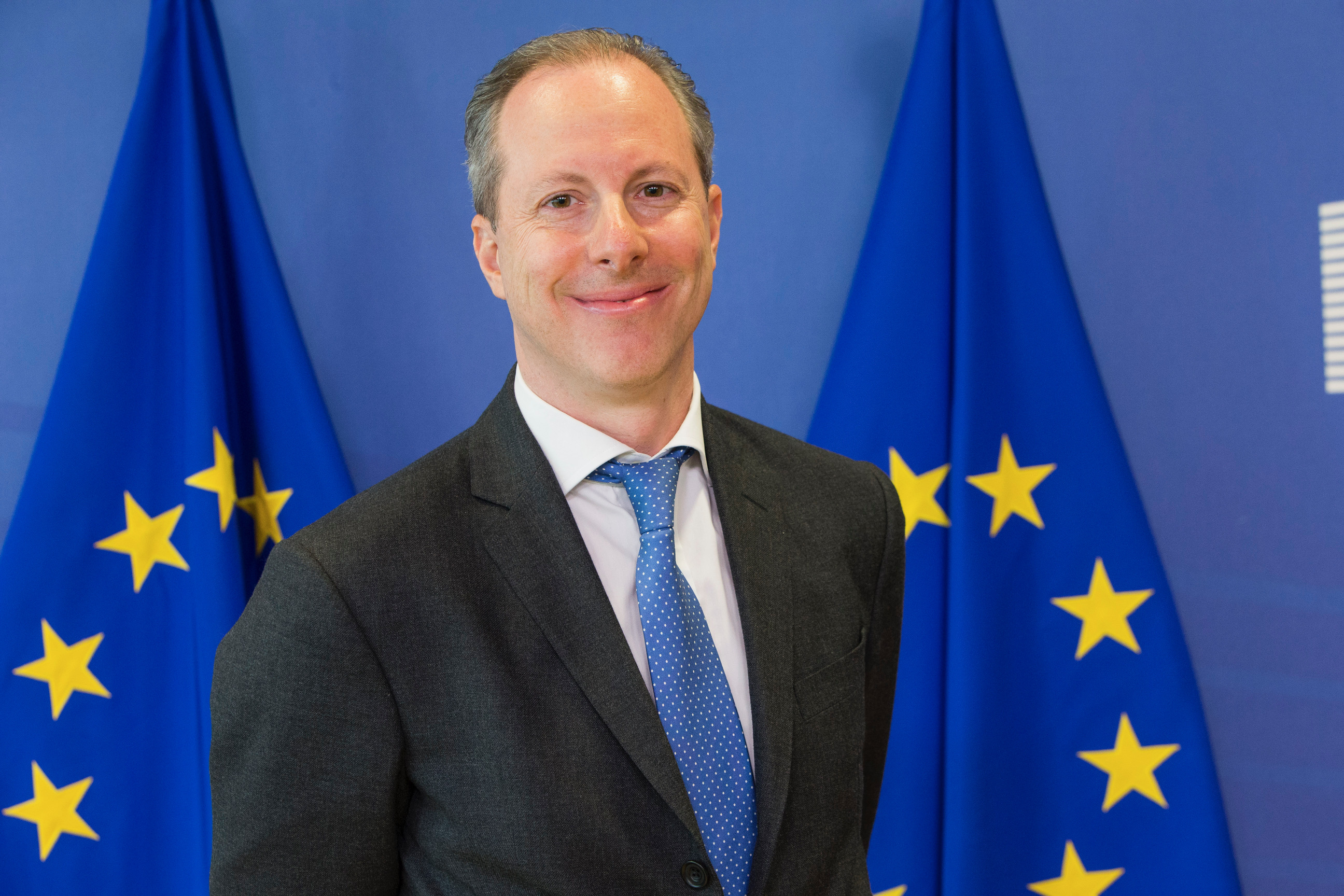

European Union Ambassador to Bolivia
- In office 1 September 2020 – 31 August 2024
- Preceded by: León de la Torre Krais

Personal details
- Born: January 20, 1972 (age 54) Vienna, Austria

Michael Dóczy (born January 20, 1972, Vienna, Austria) is an Austrian diplomat with over 25 years of experience in foreign and security policy. He has worked in the Austrian Foreign Ministry and several EU Institutions. From 2020 to 2024, he served as the European Union Ambassador to Bolivia.

== Early life and education ==
Dóczy earned a Master’s degree in Political Science and History in 1997. He is multilingual, speaking German (mother tongue), English, French, Spanish, and Italian.

== Diplomatic career ==
Dóczy started his career within the European Union's directorate of the Austrian Federal Chancellery in 1998.

He became a member of the Austrian Ministry of Foreign Affairs in 2000. In 2002, he was appointed as Attaché at the Austrian embassy in Madrid. The following year, Dóczy's trajectory took him to the Austrian Representation to the European Union in Brussels. There, he served as the Deputy Representative for Austria on the European Union's Political and Security Committee, contributed as a representative to the Political-Military Group, and participated in the EU-NATO Capability Group. When Austria held the Presidency of the European Union in 2006, he took on the leadership as chairman of the aforementioned groups. In 2007, he became the Austrian representative in the Policy Unit of the High Representative of the European Union for Common Foreign and Security Policy.

In January 2011, Michael Dóczy joined the then-recently established European External Action Service as the first Austrian diplomat. He held the position of Chief-of-Staff to the Deputy Secretary-General for Political Affairs, Helga Schmid. During this period he participated as member of the EU delegation in Iranian nuclear talks until 2014.

After serving in this capacity until 2015, he transitioned back to the Austrian Ministry for Foreign Affairs. There, he took on the positions of Deputy Director and Director-designate for the Common Foreign and Security Policy of the European Union within the Austrian Foreign Ministry. From 2017 to 2019, he served as a senior advisor in the Cabinet of Johannes Hahn, the European Commissioner for European Neighbourhood Policy and Enlargement Negotiations. During this period, Dóczy was i.a. in charge of the European Union's reform program for Ukraine and member of the EU delegation in the negotiations with Switzerland on an Institutional Framework Agreement.

=== EU ambassador to Bolivia ===
Dóczy served as the Ambassador of the European Union to Bolivia from 2020 to 2024. He led a cooperation program valued at 104 million euros for the period 2021-2024.

It is the European Union’s biggest cooperation programme in South America, focusing on environmental and climate change issues such as green energy and water management, fight against drugs and human rights.

=== Lithium ===
Bolivia is home to the world’s biggest lithium reserves, a critical raw material essential for the production of batteries and hence of key importance for the green transition. In the context of the EU Global Gateway Investment Agenda, launched by European Commission President Ursula von der Leyen in 2021, Dóczy engaged with the Bolivian authorities on the question of lithium extraction. In November 2023, a delegation of several European companies visited several salt flats and presented their technological capacities in a fair in La Paz, inaugurated by Dóczy.

== Russia’s war of aggression against Ukraine ==
A few month before the Russian invasion of Ukraine, Dóczy published a response to an article by Wolfgang Sporrer, a member of the Adjunct faculty at the Hertie School, in the Austrian weekly newspaper “Falter” under the title “Antwort auf den Artikel "Kriegsszenarien in der Ukraine"”. He criticised Sporrer for showing misleading equidistance between the aggressor Russia and the victim of aggression Ukraine and for blaming the West for allegedly adding fuel to the fire. He warned that “it may simply be inconceivable from a rational “Western” perspective that Moscow is actually planning further military aggression. This is understandable, but at the same time a dangerous self-deception. We should have no illusions: an armed conflict (some use the word war) can no longer be ruled out.”

== Debate about Austria's security policy ==
After the start of Russia’s invasion of Ukraine in 2022, Dóczy, together with a small group of like-minded figures, including former presidential candidate Irmgard Griss, initiated a public letter addressed to the President of Austria, the federal government, and Parliament. The letter called for a national debate on Austria’s future security policy, the role of Austrian neutrality, and the country’s dependency on Russian gas, with the goal of developing a new Austrian security doctrine. The initiative was supported by 80 members of Austrian civil society, including representatives from the private sector, the military, retired diplomats, and academics. Despite sending a second letter in 2023, no public debate or formal adoption of a new doctrine occurred at that time. In April 2025, the Austrian federal government announced a renewed discussion on national security during its two-day government retreat, emphasizing the need to strengthen Austria’s security policy in response to changing global conditions. The government outlined common foreign policy principles, noting Austria’s commitment to actively engage in the European Union’s Common Foreign and Security Policy, to enhance national defense capabilities, and to embed security considerations within democratic and parliamentary processes. Key officials, including the Foreign Minister, Defense Minister, and State Secretary, highlighted Austria’s intent to maintain international partnerships, uphold neutrality, increase defense spending, and promote a comprehensive approach linking internal and external security to social stability and national resilience.

== Publications and advocacy ==
As ambassador, Dóczy authored several op-eds addressing pressing global and regional issues. In Ucrania, guerra y valentía (La Razón, February 2024), he reflected on Ukraine’s resilience during the Russian invasion. In Bolivia, el agua y el apoyo de la UE (El País, March 2023), he highlighted EU support for sustainable water management in Bolivia. He emphasized collective environmental responsibility in Juntos podemos frenar la deforestación (El Deber, October 2022), addressed the global food crisis in Rusia es responsable de la crisis alimentaria mundial (El Deber, July 2022), and called for international climate action in COP26: Un llamado a la alianza integral por el planeta (El Deber, November 2021).

== See also ==
- List of ambassadors of the European Union
