= Dolejší =

Dolejší is a Czech unisex surname. The surname (and similar surnames like Dolejš) originated from the comparative adjective dolejší ('lower', here meaning "the one who is located/living in a lower place") and used to distinguish namesakes. The opposite is the surname Horejš. Notable people with the surname include:

- Břetislav Dolejší (1928–2010), Czech footballer
- Jitka Dolejší (born 1958), Czech archer
