= Jānis Mažeiks =

Latvian diplomat

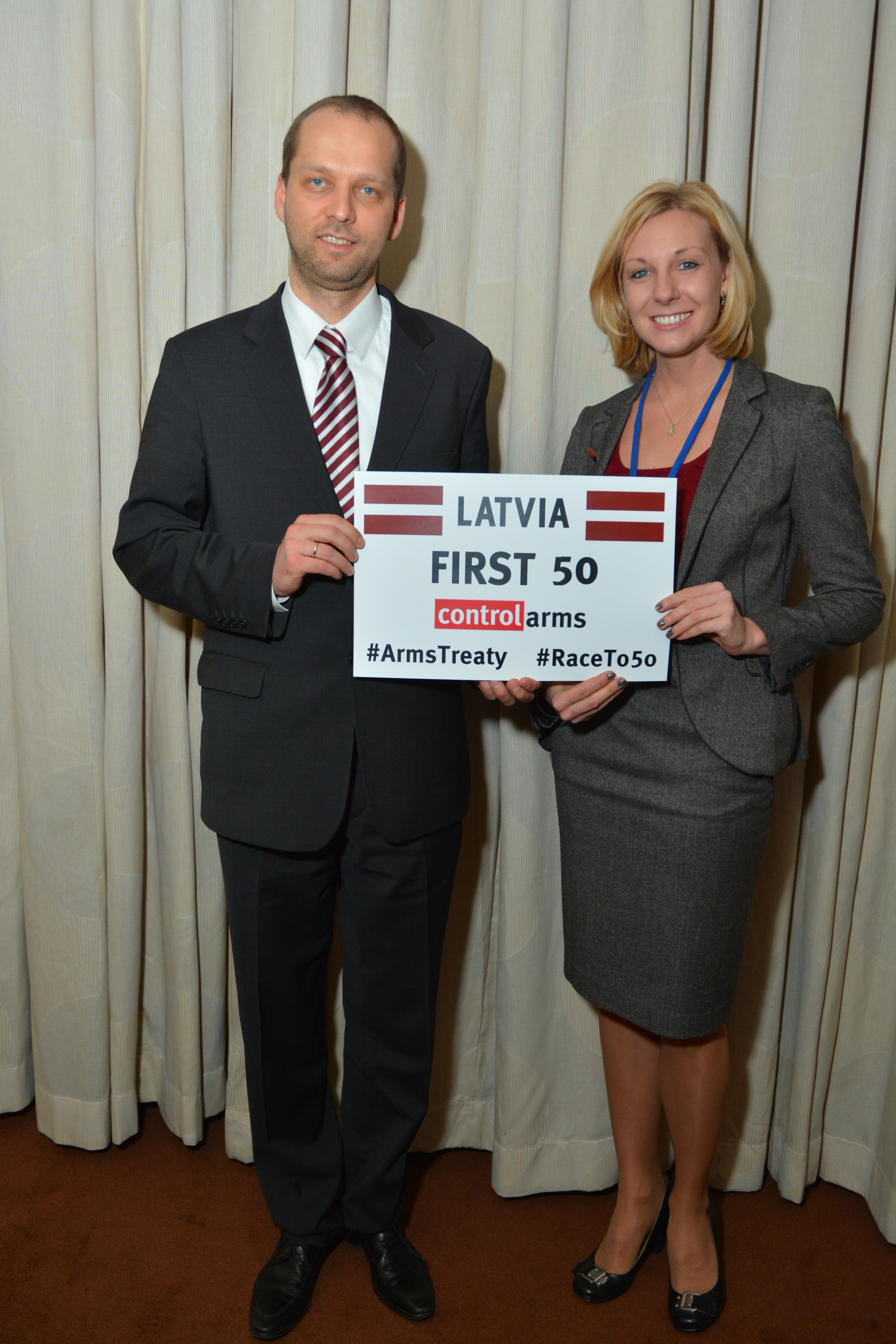
- Mažeiks in 2014

Ambassador of the European Union in Moldova
- Incumbent
- Assumed office September 2021

Ambassador Extraordinary and Plenipotentiary, Permanent Representative of the Republic of Latvia to the United Nations
- In office 2013–2018
- In office 2007–2011

Ambassador and Permanent Representative of Latvia to the World Trade Organization
- In office 2007–2011

Personal details
- Born: 31 January 1973 (age 53)
- Spouse: Dace Mažeika
- Children: 3
- Education: University of Latvia; University of Padua
- Occupation: Diplomat

Jānis Mažeiks (born 31 January 1973) is a Latvian diplomat, who currently serves as the Ambassador of the European Union to Moldova.

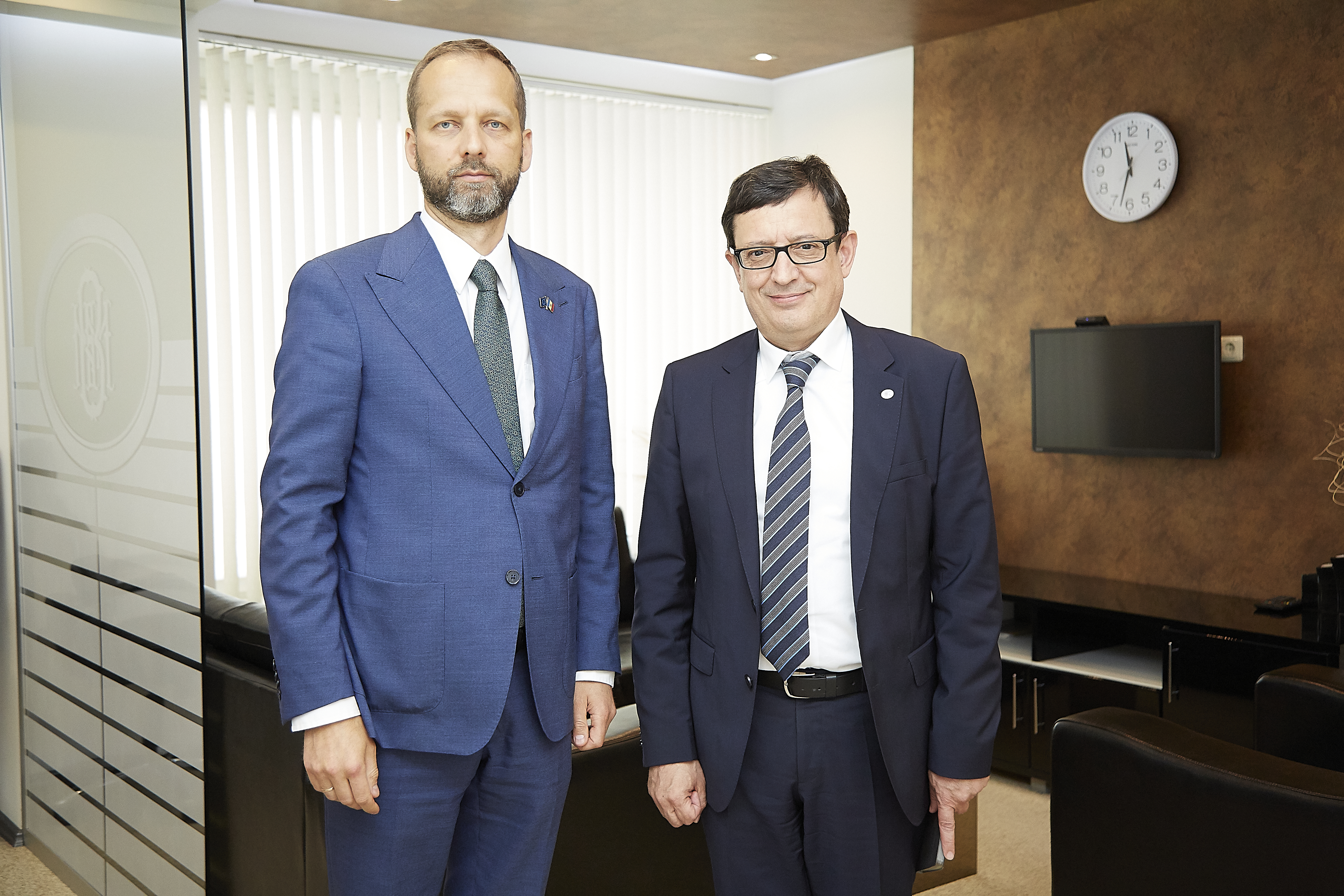
Mažeiks with NBM governor Octavian Armașu, June 2022

Previously he worked as Ambassador Extraordinary and Plenipotentiary, Permanent Representative of the Republic of Latvia to the United Nations in Geneva and to the WTO from 2007 to July 2011, and later in New York (2013-2018).

Beside Latvian language, Mažeiks speaks English, French, Russian, Romanian and Danish. He is married to Dace Mažeika and has 3 children.
