= Jacek Jankowski =

Polish diplomat (born 1969)

Poland Ambassador to Ethiopia
- In office November 2012 – 2017
- Preceded by: Jarosław Szczepankiewicz
- Succeeded by: Aleksander Kropiwnicki

European Union Ambassador to Zambia
- In office September 2019 – August 2023
- Preceded by: Alessandro Mariani
- Succeeded by: Karolina Stasiak

European Union Ambassador to Sierra Leone
- Incumbent
- Assumed office 2024
- Preceded by: Manuel Müller

Personal details
- Born: 19 June 1969 (age 57) Warsaw, Poland
- Education: University of Warsaw; Warsaw School of Economics; Columbia University
- Profession: Diplomat

Jacek Jankowski (born 19 June 1969 in Warsaw) is a Polish diplomat. He was Polish Ambassador to Ethiopia and the African Union (2012–2017) and the European Union Ambassador to Zambia and COMESA (2019–2023) and Sierra Leone (since 2024).

== Life ==
Jankowski graduated from Political Sciences at the University of Warsaw (M.A., 1994), Banking and Finances at the SGH Warsaw School of Economics (M.A., 1998), and International Relations at the Columbia University (M.A., 2001).

In 1994, he began his professional career as a specialist at the Council of Ministers Office where he was working until 1997 (then named Chancery of the Prime Minister). From January 1998 to August 2000 he worked for the Energy Regulatory Authority of Poland. He spent four months in 2001 in Washington, D.C. as the World Bank specialist for development policy of Africa. Between 2005 and 2012, he was working at the Permanent Representation of Poland to the European Union in Brussels, being responsible for Polish foreign policy at the European Parliament, and relations with Sub-Saharan Africa countries. Between November 2012 and 2017, he was serving as Poland ambassador to Ethiopia, being accredited to Djibouti, and the African Union, as well. Back in Warsaw he was deputy director at the Political Director's Office, Ministry of Foreign Affairs of Poland. In 2019, he was nominated European Union ambassador to Zambia. In 2024, he became European Union ambassador to Sierra Leone.

In 2014, he was honoured by the Minister of Foreign Affairs "Amicus Oeconomiae" award for supporting abroad Polish entrepreneurs.

Besides Polish, he speaks English, French, German, and Russian.
