= Carmen Moreno Raymundo =

Spanish diplomat

Carmen Moreno Raymundo (Note: In this Spanish name, the first or paternal surname is Moreno and the second or maternal family name is Raymundo.) is a Spanish diplomat who serves as the European Union ambassador to Cambodia and was the Spanish ambassador to Thailand, Myanmar, Laos and Cambodia from December 2012 until June 2017.

Moreno received a law degree from the Universidad Autónoma de Madrid.
