= Aurelia Bouchez =

French diplomat

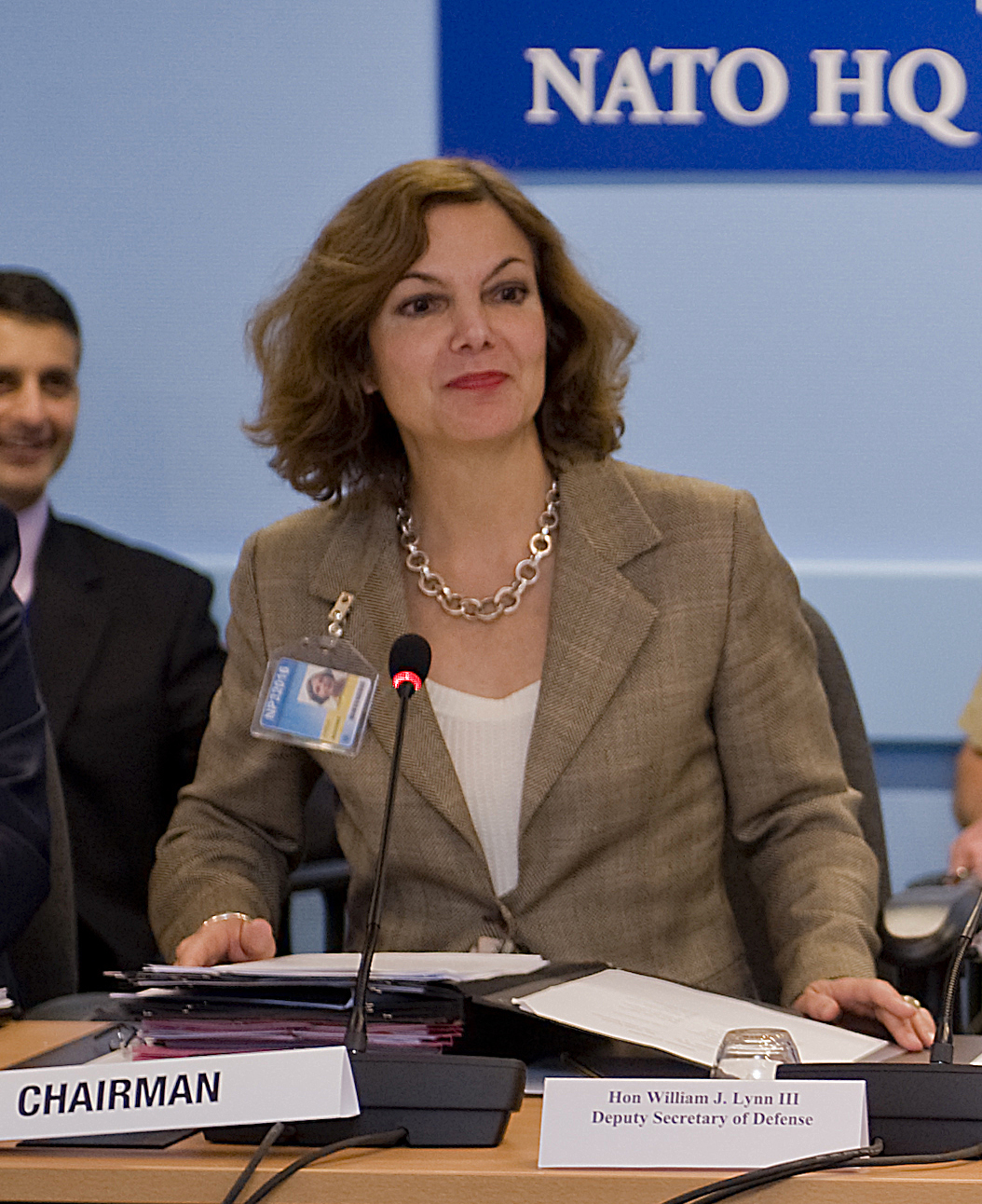
Aurelia Bouchez in 2010

Aurelia Bouchez (born 20 January 1960) is a French diplomat who was Ambassador to Azerbaijan and the European Union Ambassador to Kazakhstan from 2011 until 2015.

From 2021 to 2025 she served as the French ambassador in Uzbekistan, replacing Isabelle Servoz-Gallucci.

Her brother's name is Eric Bouchez
