= Bettina Muscheidt =

German diplomat

Bettina Muscheidt is a German diplomat. She has served as Ambassador of the European Union to Nicaragua and previously served as the Ambassador to Yemen and Libya.

== Biography ==
Muscheidt has a graduate degree from the Fletcher School of Law and Diplomacy at Tufts University in Medford and Somerville, Massachusetts, then studied a masters degree in Agricultural and Development Economics from the University of Bonn in Bonn, Germany.

Before entering diplomatic service, Muscheidt had a career in banking, working as Senior Policy Officer with the European Investment Bank in Brussels, Belgium and as Country Officer of West Bank in Luxembourg.

Muscheidt was appointed Ambassador of the European Union to Yemen in 2012. She has also served in the European External Action Service. In 2017, she was Ambassador of the European Union to Libya.

On 20 September 2021, Muscheidt was appointed Ambassador of the European Union to Nicaragua, succeeding Pelayo Castro from Spain. In September 2022, Nicaragua declared her persona non grata and asked her to leave. The declaration came days after Charles Michel, EU delegate to the United Nations, condemned the government of Nicaragua and urged President Daniel Ortega to "restore democracy." As a result, she was expelled. She left the country on 1 October 2022, three days after being asked to leave.
