= Iwona Piórko =

Polish diplomat

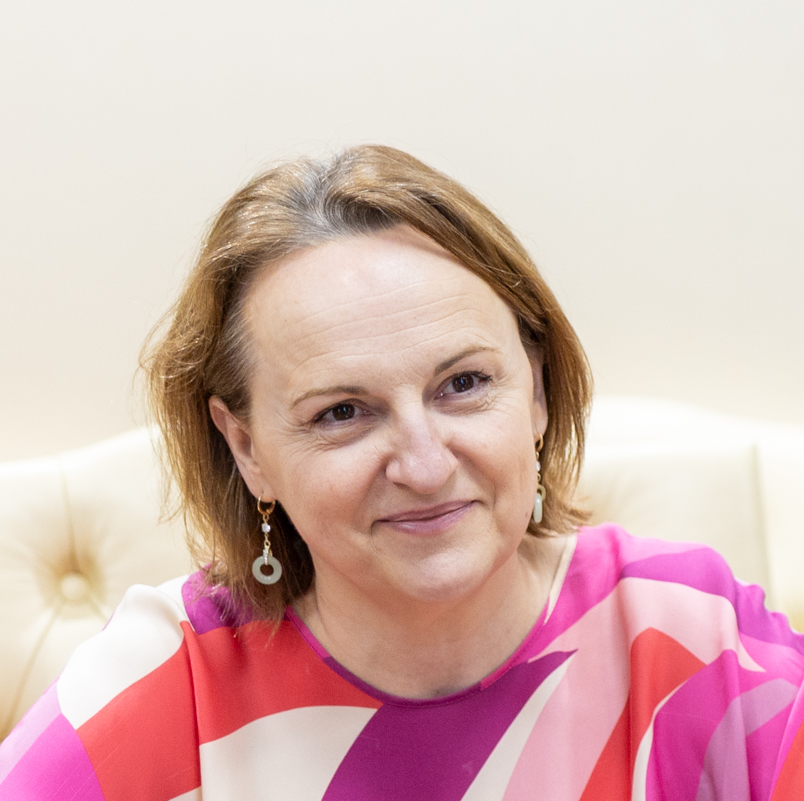
- Piórko in 2025

European Union Ambassador to Republic of Moldova
- Incumbent
- Assumed office 1 September 2025
- Preceded by: Jānis Mažeiks

Personal details
- Children: 1
- Education: University of Warsaw, College of Europe, University of Sussex

Iwona Daria Piórko-Bermig is a European Union civil servant from Poland, since 2025 serving as the European Union ambassador to Moldova.

Iwona Piórko between 1992 and 1997 was studying Hispanism at the University of Warsaw. In 1998, she earned Master of Arts in Advanced European Studies at the College of Europe. In 2001, she started doctoral studies at the University of Sussex. In 2005, she defended there her doctorate in Contemporary European Studies on European Neighbourhood Policy.

From 1999 to 2000 she worked as Academic Assistant at the College of Europe in Bruges and Warsaw. In 2005, she started her career in European Commission. Until 2010, she was policy officer in charge of integration of immigrants at Directorate-General for Justice, Freedom and Security. Between 2010 and 2014, she was Member of Cabinet of Commissioner for Enlargement and European Neighbourhood Policy Štefan Füle. From 2014 to 2017, she worked as a Member of Cabinet of Vice-president/High Representative of the Union for Foreign Affairs and Security Policy Federica Mogherini. In the years 2017–2021, she served as a Head of Unit ‘International Affairs’ at the Directorate-General for Internal Market, Industry, Entrepreneurship and SMEs. From 1 February to 31 July 2021, she was Member of Cabinet of Executive Vice-president Margrethe Vestager. On 1 September 2021, she started her mission as the European Union ambassador to Singapore. She finished her term in 2025. On 1 September 2025, she started her mission as the European Union ambassador to Moldova.

Besides Polish, she speaks English, French and Spanish and German. She is married with a daughter.
