= Małgorzata Wasilewska =

Polish diplomat

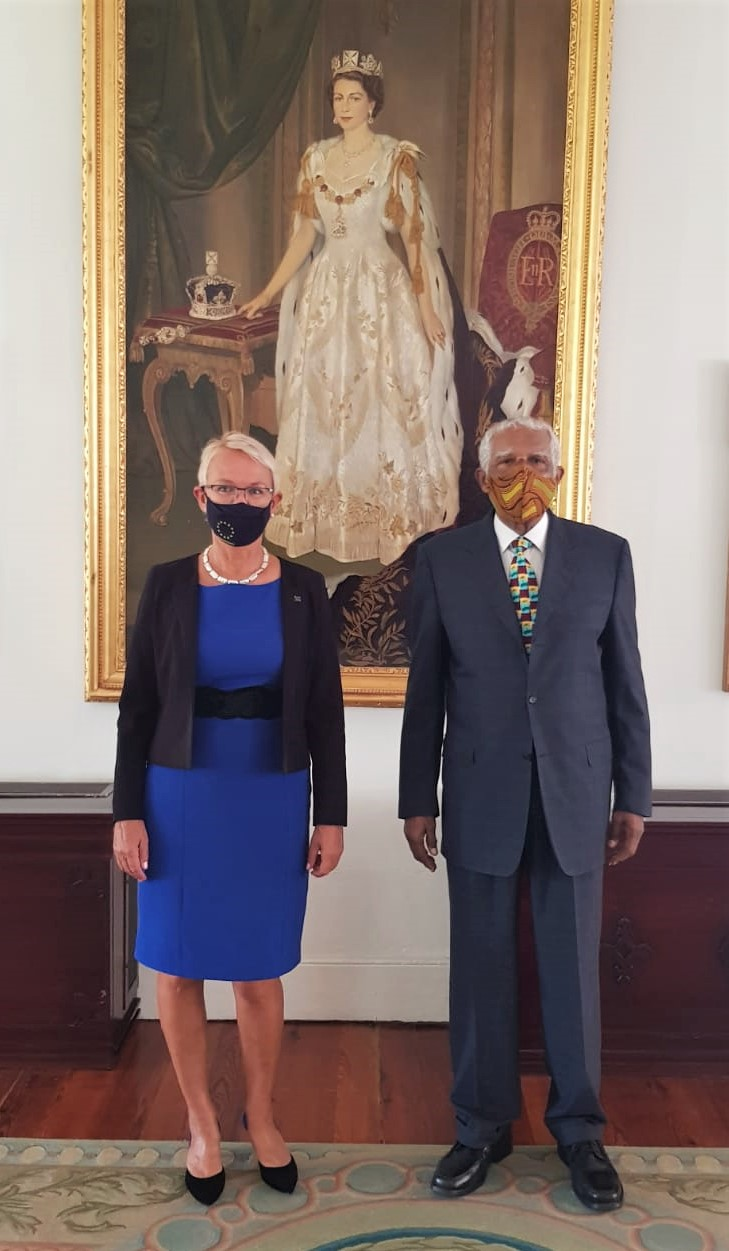

European Union Ambassador to Jamaica
- In office September 2016 – August 2020
- Preceded by: Paola Amadei
- Succeeded by: Marianne Van Steen

European Union Ambassador to Barbados
- In office September 2020 – August 2025
- Preceded by: Daniela Tramacere
- Succeeded by: Fiona Ramsey

Personal details
- Born: 1960 (age 65–66)

Małgorzata Wasilewska (born 1960) is a Polish diplomat, human rights activist, and European Union ambassador to Jamaica (2016–2020), Barbados (2020–2025) and the Caribbean Community (2021–2025).

== Biography ==
Until 2003, Wasilewska was president of Polish section of Amnesty International. She has been working also for Saferworld as a senior specialist on organizational governance and strategic planning. Next, she became European Union civil servant, working at the European Commission Directorate-General for External Relations. She has been Head of Division for Election Observation and Democracy Support, managing election observation missions to several countries, e.g. Mozambique, Sudan, Chad, Afghanistan, Solomon Islands, Honduras, Bolivia.

In 2011, Wasilewska joined the European External Action Service, heading Division for Conflict Prevention, Peace Building and Mediation Instruments, and Division for Election Observation and Democracy Support. In September 2016 she was appointed EU ambassador to Jamaica, accredited to Belize, Bahamas, Turks and Caicos Islands and the Cayman Islands, as well.

Her term ended in August 2020 and by the end of 2020 she was appointed EU ambassador to the Barbados, the Eastern Caribbean states, the OECS and Caricom/Cariforum. She ended her term in August 2025.

Wasilewska specializes in conflict-sensitive development, post-conflict democracy building, and nonproliferation of small arms and light weapons.

== See also ==
- Nuala Lawlor
