= Chris Hoornaert =

Belgian diplomat

Chris Hoornaert (born 24 December 1963 in Kortrijk) is a Belgian diplomat. Hoornaert served as Head of Mission of the European Union Delegation to Panama between 2018 and 2022. From 2014 to 2018 he was the Ambassador of Belgium to the Netherlands. Between 2011 and 2014, he served as "Ambassador of the Port of Antwerp," a position created in 2008.

He served as Permanent Representative of Belgium to the OECD from 2007 to 2011, with the rank of Ambassador. Until his appointment by the Belgian government as Permanent Representative, he was Diplomatic Advisor to the Belgian Prime Minister from 2004 to 2007. He was Director for EU External Relations at the Ministry of Foreign Affairs from 2003 to 2004.

He holds a degree in political and social sciences from the Katholieke Universiteit Leuven and a postgraduate degree from the College of Europe (class of 1985–1986).
