= Isabel Brilhante Pedrosa =

Portuguese diplomat (born 1964)

Isabel Brilhante Pedrosa (born 1964) is a Portuguese diplomat who served as the European Union Ambassador to Venezuela. She became the ambassador in February 2018 and she was asked to leave in the following year.

== Career ==
Brilhante Pedrosa had served as Portugal's Consul General in Caracas as well as Portugal's ambassador to Namibia (she presented her credentials on July 20, 2016) and Libya.

In February 2018, she became the European Union Ambassador to Venezuela. On June 29, 2020, Nicolás Maduro expelled Brilhante Pedrosa, giving her 72 hours to leave the country, but the decision was later reversed. On 24 February 2021, the ruling party controlled National Assembly in Venezuela called on the government to expel her, following new sanctions by the bloc against 19 Venezuelan officials. Maduro's government declared her persona non grata afterwards, and once more gave her 72 hours to leave the country. Brilhante Pedrosa left after a week. In retaliation the EU decided in 2021 to declare Venezuela's ambassador to the EU as also persona no grata. However the diplomat Claudia Salerno Caldera was also the ambassador to other countries, and this confused the case of expelling her.

In 2021, the EU High Representative for Foreign Policy, Josep Borrell, appointed Brilhante Pedrosa as a member of a delegation to Cuba.
