= Tomasz Kozłowski =

Polish diplomat

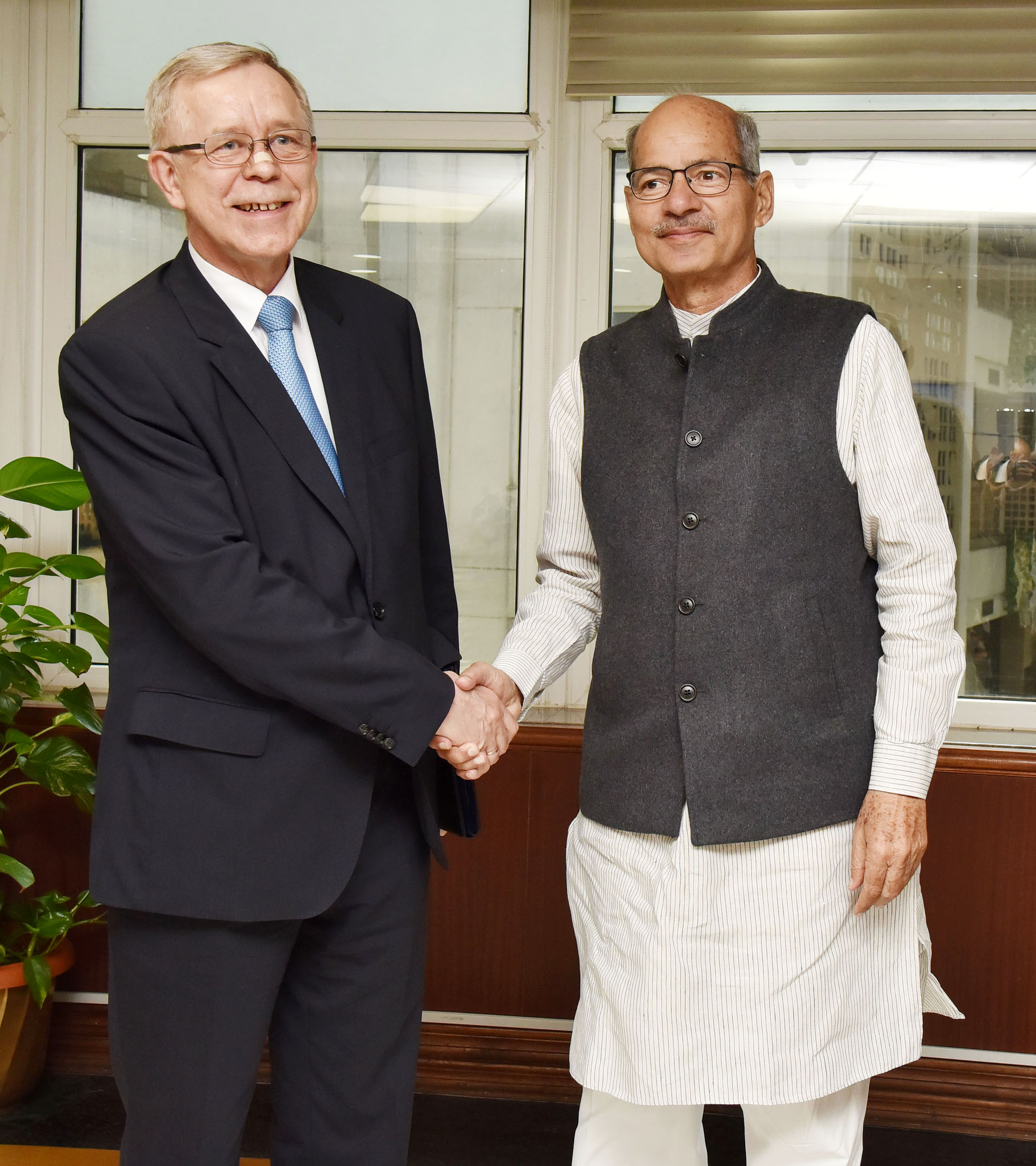
- Tomasz Kozłowski and Anil Madhav Dave

Poland Ambassador to Pakistan
- In office 2001–2003
- Preceded by: Lucjan Mieczkowski
- Succeeded by: Bogdan Marczewski

1st European Union Ambassador to South Korea
- In office 2011–2015
- Succeeded by: Gerhard Sabathil

2nd European Union Ambassador to India
- In office 2015–2019
- Preceded by: João Cravinho
- Succeeded by: Ugo Astuto

Personal details
- Born: 1958 (age 67–68)
- Children: 3
- Education: Moscow State Institute of International Relations
- Profession: Diplomat

Tomasz Edward Kozłowski (born 1958) is a Polish diplomat, Poland ambassador to Pakistan (2001–2003), European Union ambassador to South Korea (2011–2015) and India (2015–2019).

== Life ==
Kozłowski had started his studies at the Warsaw School of Economics. He graduated from the Moscow State Institute of International Relations (1984), specializing in the relations among Asian states. He has been studying also at the Stanford University, California.

In 1984, Kozłowski started his career at the Ministry of Foreign Affairs of Poland. He has been working as the Third and Second Secretary at the Embassy in Jakarta, Indonesia (1987–1991). He was serving as chargé d'affaires in Malaysia (1994–1996). He was member of the United Nations international observation mission in Cambodia (1993) and South Africa (1994). Between 2001 and 2003 he was ambassador to Pakistan, accredited to Afghanistan as well. Next, he was director of the MFA Asia-Pacific Department. In 2004, he joined the European External Action Service (EEAS), working as a head of unit at the bureau of the High Representative of the Union for Foreign Affairs and Security Policy Javier Solana. He was also advisor at the Directorate-General for External Relations. From 2011 to 2015 he was first European Union ambassador to South Korea. Next, from 2015 to 2019 he was EU ambassador to India, accredited also to Bhutan. Next, he served as a head of the EEAS Inspection Service.

In 2010 Kozłowski was honoured with the Knight's Cross of the Order of Polonia Restituta.

Besides Polish, he speaks English, Russian and Indonesian. He is married, with three children.
