= Estonia–Turkey relations =

Bilateral relations of Estonia and Turkey

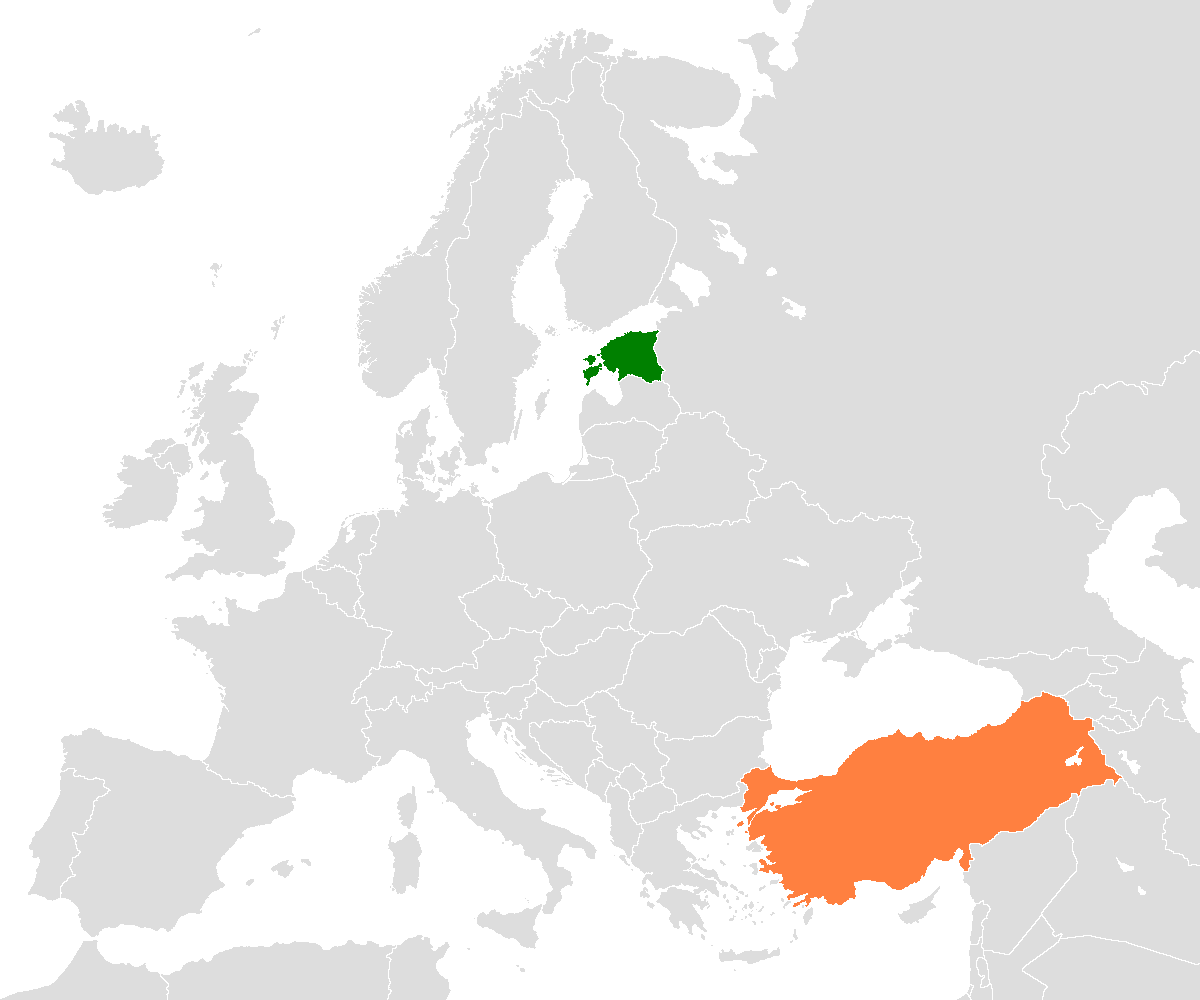
- Estonia: Turkey

Diplomatic mission
- Estonian Embassy, Ankara: Turkish Embassy, Tallinn

Envoy
- Ambassador: Ambassador

Estonia–Turkey relations are the bilateral relations between Estonia and Turkey. Estonia has an embassy in Ankara and Turkey has an embassy in Tallinn. Both countries are full members of Council of Europe and NATO. Estonia is also an EU member and Turkey is an EU candidate.

The basis of Estonia–Turkey relations is based on the "Agreement of Friendship and Cooperation" signed on 1 December 1924. The occupation and annexation of Estonia by the Soviet Union in 1940 was not recognized by Turkey. After Estonia regained its independence on 20 August 1991, diplomatic relations were established between the two countries with the Joint Declaration signed on 2 October 1991.

== Official Visits ==
Guest	Host	Place of visit	Date of visit
(Turkey) President Recep Tayyip Erdoğan	(Estonia) President Toomas Hendrik Ilves	Presidential Palace, Tallinn	October 23–24, 2014
(Turkey) Minister of Foreign Affairs Mevlüt Çavuşoğlu	(Estonia) Minister of Foreign Affairs Jürgen Ligi	Presidential Palace, Tallinn	October 27, 2016
(Estonia) Minister of Foreign Affairs Sven Mikser	(Turkey) Minister of Foreign Affairs Mevlüt Çavuşoğlu	Çankaya Köşkü, Ankara	July 2017
(Estonia) Prime Minister Jüri Ratas	(Turkey) Prime Minister Binali Yıldırım	Çankaya Köşkü, Ankara	August 2017
(Estonia) President Alar Karis	(Turkey) President Recep Tayyip Erdoğan	Presidential Palace, Ankara	June 27, 2024

== Economic relations ==
- Trade volume between the two countries was US$312 million in 2018 (Turkish exports/imports: US$92/220 million).
- 2,622 Turkish persons have applied for Estonia's e-residency, making Turkey 12th biggest country in the program. Turkey is the fourth country in the world by number of companies established by e-residents – 712.
- 61,707 Estonian tourists visited Turkey in 2018.

== See also ==
- Foreign relations of Estonia
- Foreign relations of Turkey
- Turkey-EU relations
  - Accession of Turkey to the EU
- NATO-EU relations
