= Gautier Mignot =

French diplomat

Head of the Delegation of the European Union to Nigeria and ECOWAS
- Incumbent
- Assumed office September 2024

Head of the Delegation of the European Union to Mexico
- Incumbent
- Assumed office April 2021

Ambassador of France to Colombia
- In office 2017–2020

Personal details
- Education: ESSEC Business School; École nationale d'administration
- Occupation: Diplomat

Gautier Mignot is a French diplomat currently serving as Head of the Delegation of the European Union to Nigeria and the Economic Community of West African States (ECOWAS) since September 2024. He previously served as Head of the European Union Delegation to Mexico and as Ambassador of France to Colombia.

== Diplomatic career ==
Mignot was previoysly the Head of the Delegation of the European Union to Mexico. He assumed his duties in April 2021, succeeding his previous diplomatic assignments in Colombia and the French foreign service.

=== Ambassador of the European Union to Nigeria and ECOWAS ===
Amb. Mignot was appointed was appointed head of delegation if EU to Nigeria and ECOWAS in September 2024. In this position he represents the EU in its diplomatic relations with Nigeria and Ecowas.
