= Riina Kionka =

Estonian diplomat (born 1960)

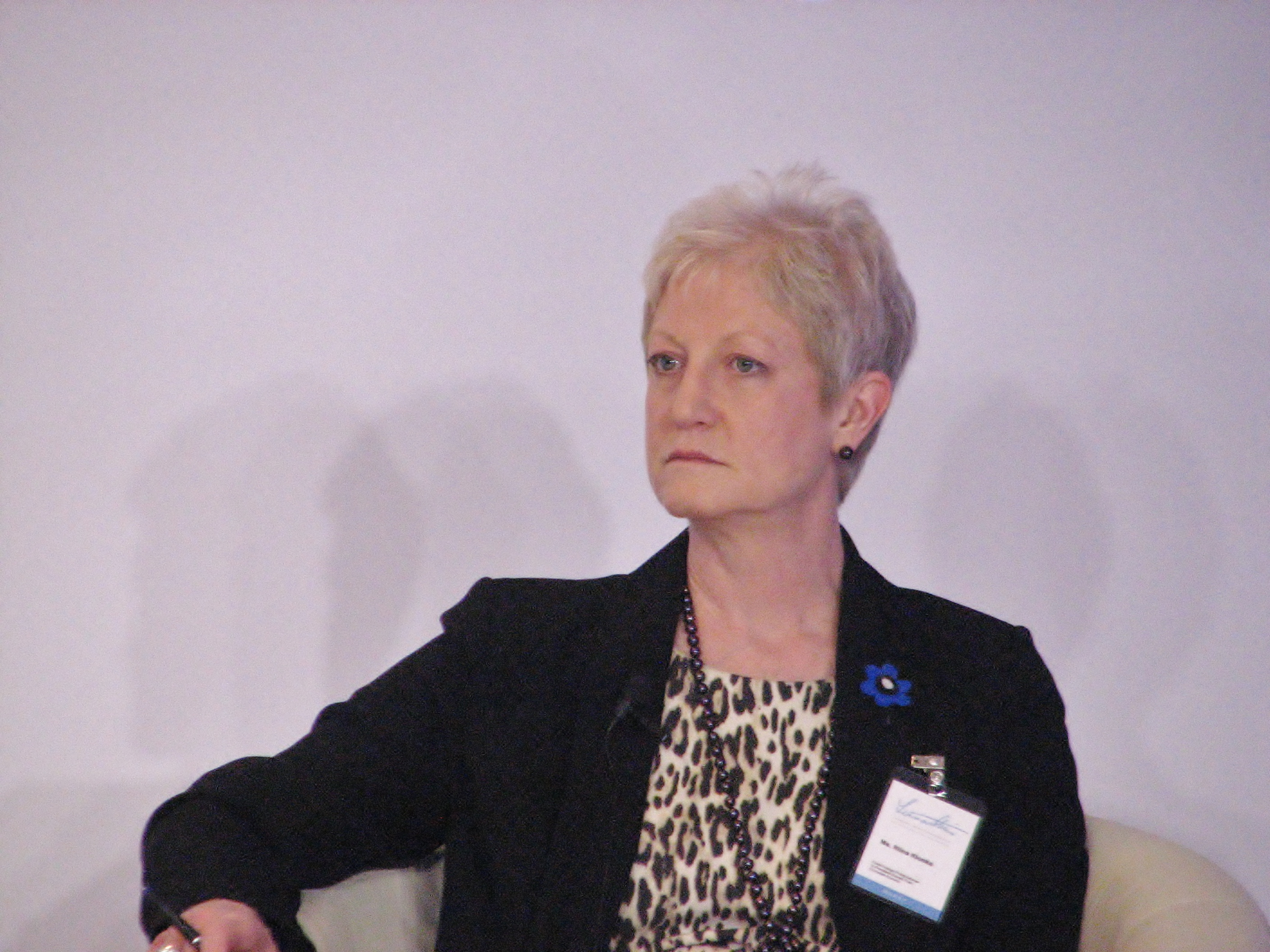
Riina Kionka (2015)

Riina Ruth Kionka (born 29 December 1960) is an American-born Estonian diplomat who is the EU Ambassador to the Islamic Republic of Pakistan.

== Early life and education ==
Born on 29 December 1960 in Detroit, Michigan, Kionka is the daughter of an Estonian mother and an American father. After completing her school education in Detroit, she studied international relations and German literature at James Madison College, graduating in 1983. In 1984, she moved to New York City where she studied political science at Columbia University, earning an MA in 1986. That summer she was an intern with Radio Free Europe in Munich while the following year she took an intensive course in Russian at Norwich University, Vermont.

== Career ==
After a year performing research at the University of Bonn, in 1989 Kionka returned to Munich, where she spent four years working as an analyst in the Estonian section of Radio Free Europe. In 1993, she joined the Estonian Ministry of Foreign Affairs, where she was promoted to political director in 1995.

In 1996, together with her husband Lauri Lepik, a diplomat, Kionka returned to the United States, where she completed her PhD on Estonian politics, while raising two children.

After a brief spell back at the ministry in Tallinn, in 2000 Kionka was appointed Ambassador of Estonia to Germany in Berlin, where she remained until August 2004. In 2005, she joined the Council of the European Union, where she headed a unit dealing with transatlantic relations and the United Nations. In 2007, she became Javier Solana's special representative on human rights, and in 2014 she joined Donald Tusk's cabinet as chief foreign policy adviser.

== Other activities ==
- European Council on Foreign Relations (ECFR), Member
