= Irene Horejs =

Austrian diplomat

Irene Horejs is an Austrian former European Union diplomat and official.

She served as the ambassador of the European Union (EU) to Peru (2013–2017), the Dominican Republic, Niger and Mali. She was also the head of the EU delegation to Cuba, relinquishing the post in August 2012. In July 2013, Carlos Morales Troncoso, Foreign Minister of the Dominican Republic, met with Horejs, seeking the EU's help in resolving a trade dispute with Haiti. At the end of her term as ambassador to Peru, on 17 August 2017 she was awarded the Order of the Sun of Peru (Grand Cross), that nation's highest honor.

She also served as Head of Unit for Human Development, Social Cohesion and Employment in the European Commission's Directorate-General for Development and as Acting Director, Sub-Saharan Africa, Asia, Latin America and Pacific, European Civil Protection and Humanitarian Aid Operations.
