= Karolina Stasiak =

Polish diplomat

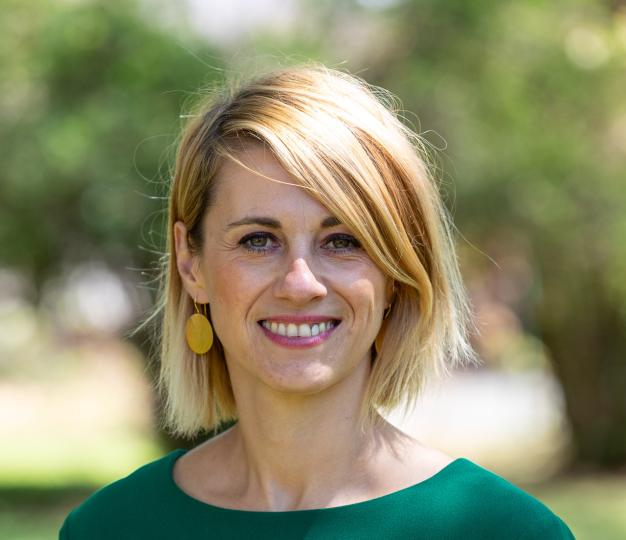

European Union Ambassador to Zambia
- Incumbent
- Assumed office 2023
- Preceded by: Jacek Jankowski

Personal details
- Education: University of Warsaw
- Profession: Official, diplomat

Karolina Eliza Stasiak is a Polish official and diplomat, since 2023 serving as the European Union Ambassador to Zambia.

== Life ==
Stasiak graduated from Linguistics at the University of Warsaw (M.A., 2002), and International Relations at the University of Warsaw (B.A., 2003).

She works for the European External Action Service. Between 2014 and 2018 she was deputy head of the European Union Delegation in Dakar, Senegal. In 2023, she was nominated European Union ambassador to Zambia and COMESA.
