= Anne Sophie Avé =

French diplomat

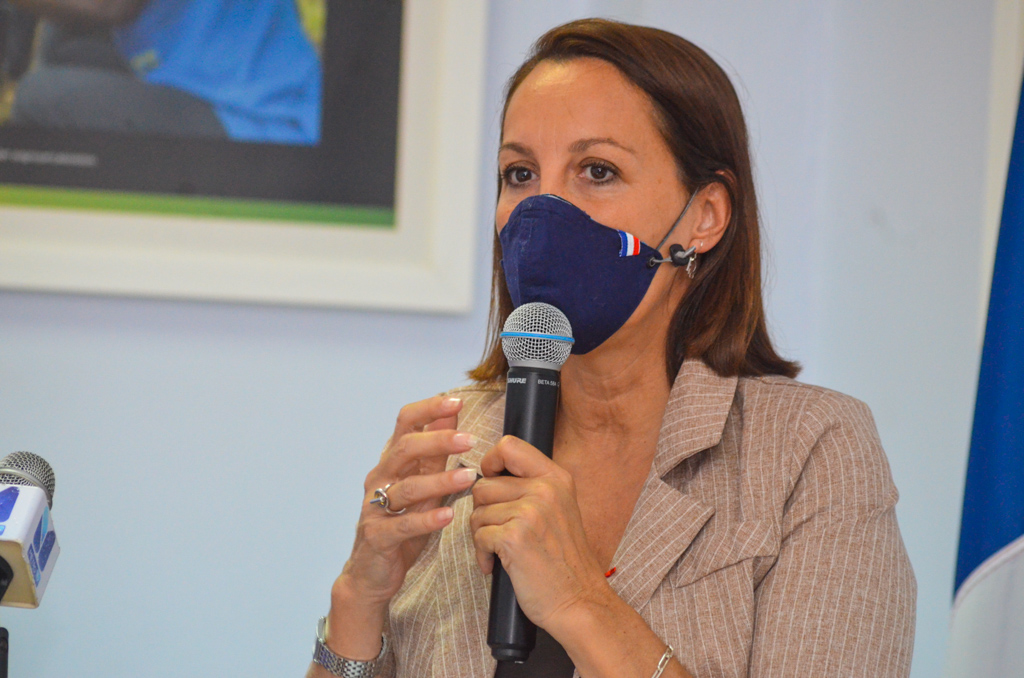
- Anne Sophie Avé; French ambassador to Ghana

Ambassador of France to Tanzania

Personal details
- Education: École Nationale d'Administration

Anne-Sophie Avé (born 10 November 1968) is a French diplomat. From September 2018 to August 2022, she was the Ambassador of France to Ghana. From 2019 to 2021, she hosts a TV talk show in Ghana called 'Touch of France'.

She is the founder of The Akosua Fund, a donor advised fund hosted by international non-governmental organisation OAfrica. The fund aims at supporting projects for children and youth of the communities where she has been made a Queen mother.

On 31 August 2022, she was appointed Ambassador for public Diplomacy in Africa by the French president Emmanuel Macron.

Since September 2024, she is ambassador of France to Tanzania

== Early life and education ==
She's born in Fontainebleau to a father who is a director of a record company and a mother who is a teacher.

She grows up in Belgium and attended Lycée Français in Brussels. Anne Sophie Avé is graduate from Toulouse Business School in 1991 and attended Ecole Nationale d’administration from 2003 to 2005.

== Honors and awards ==
She was enstooled in May 2020 as the Nkosuahemaa of Hani in the Tain District in the Bono Region (Ghana) with the stool name Nana Benneh III. In June 2022, she was enskinned the queen mother of Bonobutu under the chieftaincy name Napoka Amaltinga Apoka. In August 2022, she was enstooled a Queen mother of Osu under the stool name Naa Norley Owaa Oman.

=== Awards ===
- French National order of Merit Chevalier de l’ONM (30 January 2008)
- Knight of the Légion of Honneur (30 December 2016)
- Diplomat of the Year 2021
- Ambassador of the Year (Youth Excellence Awards 2021)
- 100 most influential change makers in Ghana
- Discovery of the Year - 2021 Ghana Movie Awards
- TV Show of the Year (Ghana Media and Entrepreneurship Awards 2021)
- Woman of the year 2022 (Golden Age Creative Arts Awards 22)
- Most outstanding female change maker (Humanitarian awards global 2022)

== Criticism ==
On August 12, 2022, Avé's Twitter account was restricted to followers, after public criticism of a Twitter post regarding France's and, by extension, her responsibility for the enslavement of African peoples during the colonial period arose. Four days earlier, Avé had posted that "slavery is a crime against humanity, and indeed some people bought slaves but some sold them. And they were not Europeans ... if you want to blame, blame all". The Tweet was a reaction to criticism of neocolonialism referring to Avé's installation as a developmental queen of Osu. The Tweet has been deleted as of August 16, 2022.

== Touch Of France ==
A TV talk show hosted by Anne-Sophie Avé stars notable persons in Ghana and showcases France and its culture. The show was awarded "TV show of the year” at Ghana Media and Entrepreneurship Awards ceremony.

== See also ==
- Lists of ambassadors of France
- Touch Of France (Replays sur YouTube)
