= Raimundas Karoblis =

Lithuanian politician

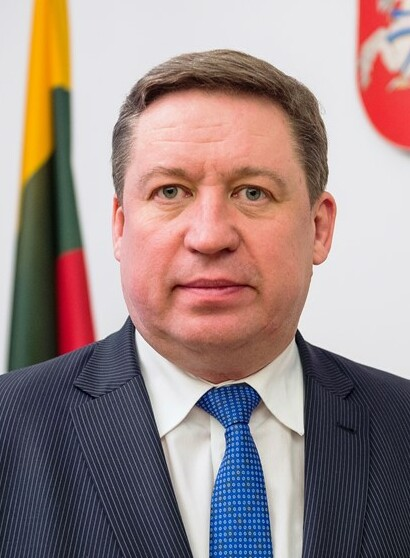

Minister of Defence
- In office 13 December 2016 – 11 December 2020
- Prime Minister: Saulius Skvernelis
- Preceded by: Juozas Olekas
- Succeeded by: Arvydas Anušauskas

Personal details
- Born: 14 April 1968 (age 58) Pasvalys District Municipality, Lithuanian SSR, USSR

Raimundas Karoblis (born 14 April 1968) is a Lithuanian politician. He served as Minister of Defence in the Skvernelis Cabinet led by Saulius Skvernelis from 13 December 2016 to 11 December 2020.

From 2022 to 2025, he was European Union ambassador to Tajikistan. In 2025, he became EU ambassador to Pakistan.
