= Gerhard Sabathil =

Former German-Hungarian EU diplomat who was falsely accused of spying for China

Gerhard Ernst Ottomar Sabathil (born 11 February 1954 in Pforzheim) is a German-Hungarian former EU diplomat.

Sabathil studied economics and history at LMU Munich and received his doctorate in 1981. He started his professional career in 1982 at the Deutsche Industrie- und Handelskammertag (Association of German Chambers of Industry and Commerce). His career at the European Union began in 1984 at the Directorate-General for Competition. This was followed by positions in the cabinet of Vice-President Karl-Heinz Narjes, as Head of Office to the Head of the Budget Directorate-General, Chargé d'Affaires at the EU delegations in Prague and Bratislava and Head of Unit for the Western Balkans in Brussels. From 2000 to 2004, Sabathil was EU Ambassador to Norway and Iceland, and from 2004 to 2008 Head of the EU Commission Representation in Germany. He was then Director in the EU Commission and the European External Action Service in Brussels until 2015, most recently for East Asia and the Pacific.

In 2020, the Generalbundesanwalt (Attorney General) investigated Sabathil on suspicion of "secret agent activity". Sabathil was alleged to be an "informant, tipster and recruiter" of the Chinese foreign intelligence service. Previously, in September 2016, his security clearance, without which no access to classified documents is possible, had been revoked, and since August 2018, he had been wiretapped by the Verfassungsschutz (BfV, Office for the Protection of the Constitution).

In November 2020, the investigation was closed. The Bundesanwaltschaft (Office of the Federal Prosecutor) reportedly criticised the BfV and voiced doubts about the credibility of the sources that were used for the accusations against Sabathil. According to the SAR, American intelligence agencies were feeding Germany falsified information about Sabathil in order to discredit him and damage diplomatic relations between the EU, Germany, and China.
