= 2008 protests against Kosovo declaration of independence =

- Part of the 2008 Kosovo declaration of independence
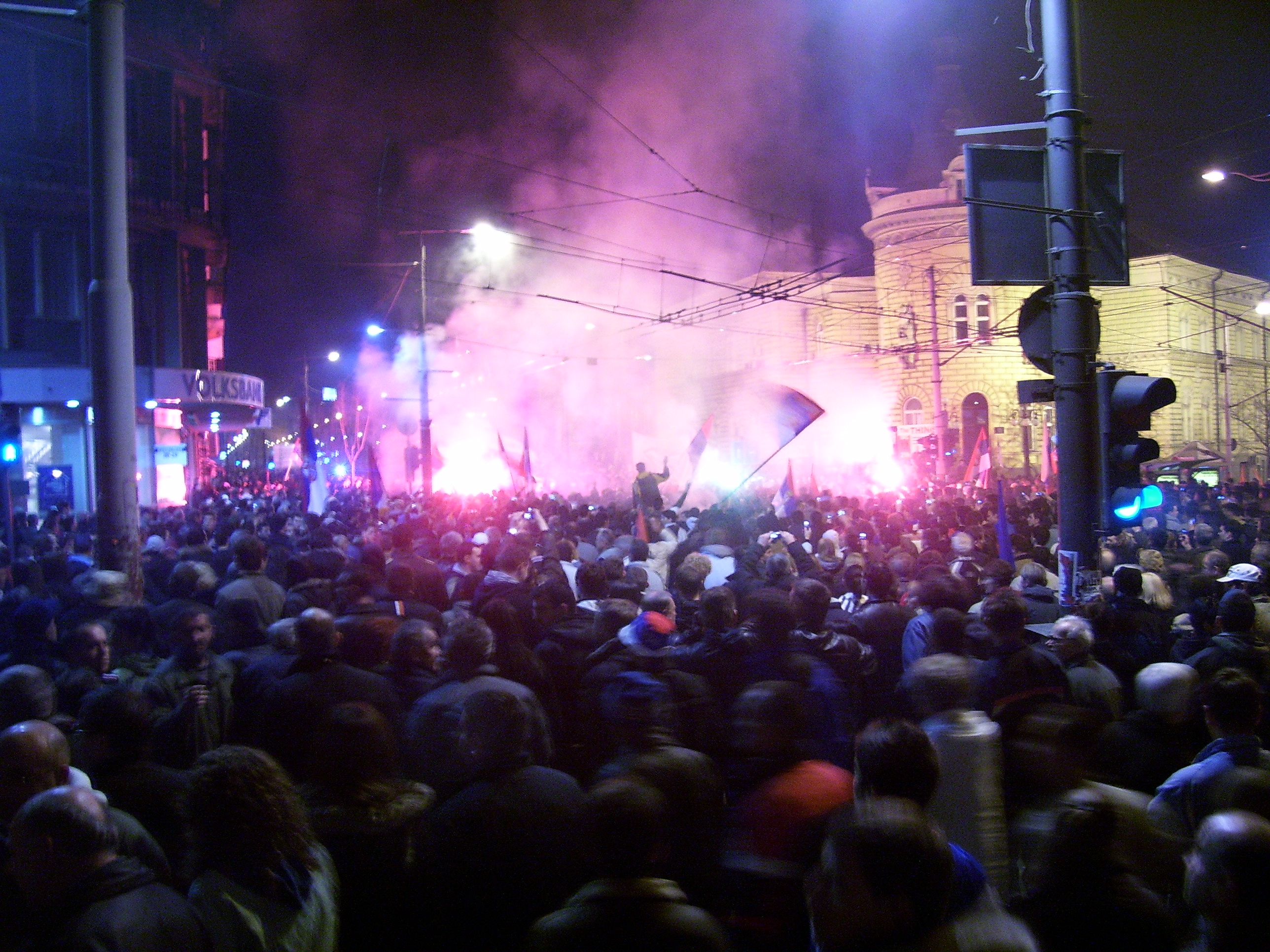
- A crowd rallies in front of SKC on February 21, 2008.
- Date: 17–28 February 2008
- Location: Largest protests and unrest occurred in Serbia, with several protests also having taken place in Bosnia and Herzegovina, Montenegro, and elsewhere
- Caused by: 2008 Kosovo declaration of independence
- Methods: Demonstrations, occupations, rioting, civil disobedience, vandalism

Parties
Police of Serbia	Serb protestors

Number
6,000+ riot police deployed	Approximately 200,000 participated

Casualties and losses
Over 100 injured 1 Ukrainian U.N Officer killed	Over 200 injured Over 200 arrested 1 death

Widespread protests and riots in Serbia and North Kosovo followed the proclamation of independence by the Republic of Kosovo on February 17, 2008. Protests were also held by Serbs in Bosnia and Herzegovina and Montenegro.

== Serbia ==
=== February 17–20 ===
- On February 17, approximately 2,000 Serbs protested and stoned, then entered the Slovenian embassy in which they made major damage (Slovenia held the rotating Council presidency of the European Union at the time), burnt down portions of the United States and Croatian embassy buildings in Belgrade, with some throwing stones and firecrackers at the buildings before being driven back by riot police.
- On February 18, a false bomb threat was called on a Slovenian Mercator store in Belgrade. It was also announced that Beovizija 2008, originally scheduled for February 19, would be rescheduled to March 10 and 11. In the multi-ethnic northern Serbian town of Subotica, approximately 300 protesting Serb youths chanted nationalist slogans directed against the country's Albanian, Hungarian and Croat communities.
- On February 19, protesters damaged several foreign businesses in Užice, including Société Générale, UniCredit and the Croatian-owned supermarket Idea. The Serbian division of U.S. Steel, based in Smederevo, had a false bomb threat called in. In Belgrade, stones were thrown by protesters at the Turkish embassy.
- On February 20, the Australian embassy in Belgrade was closed in anticipation of the following day's protests. A protest in Niš drew several thousand people and was peaceful.

=== Kosovo is Serbia protest ===
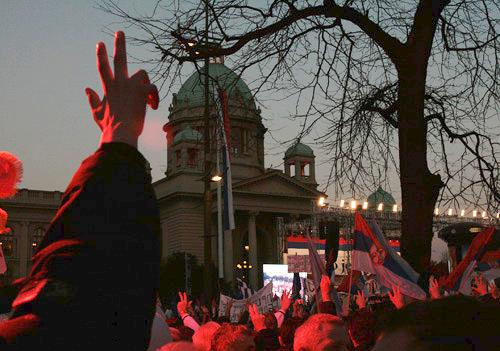
Kosovo is Serbia rally on February 21, 2008 in Belgrade

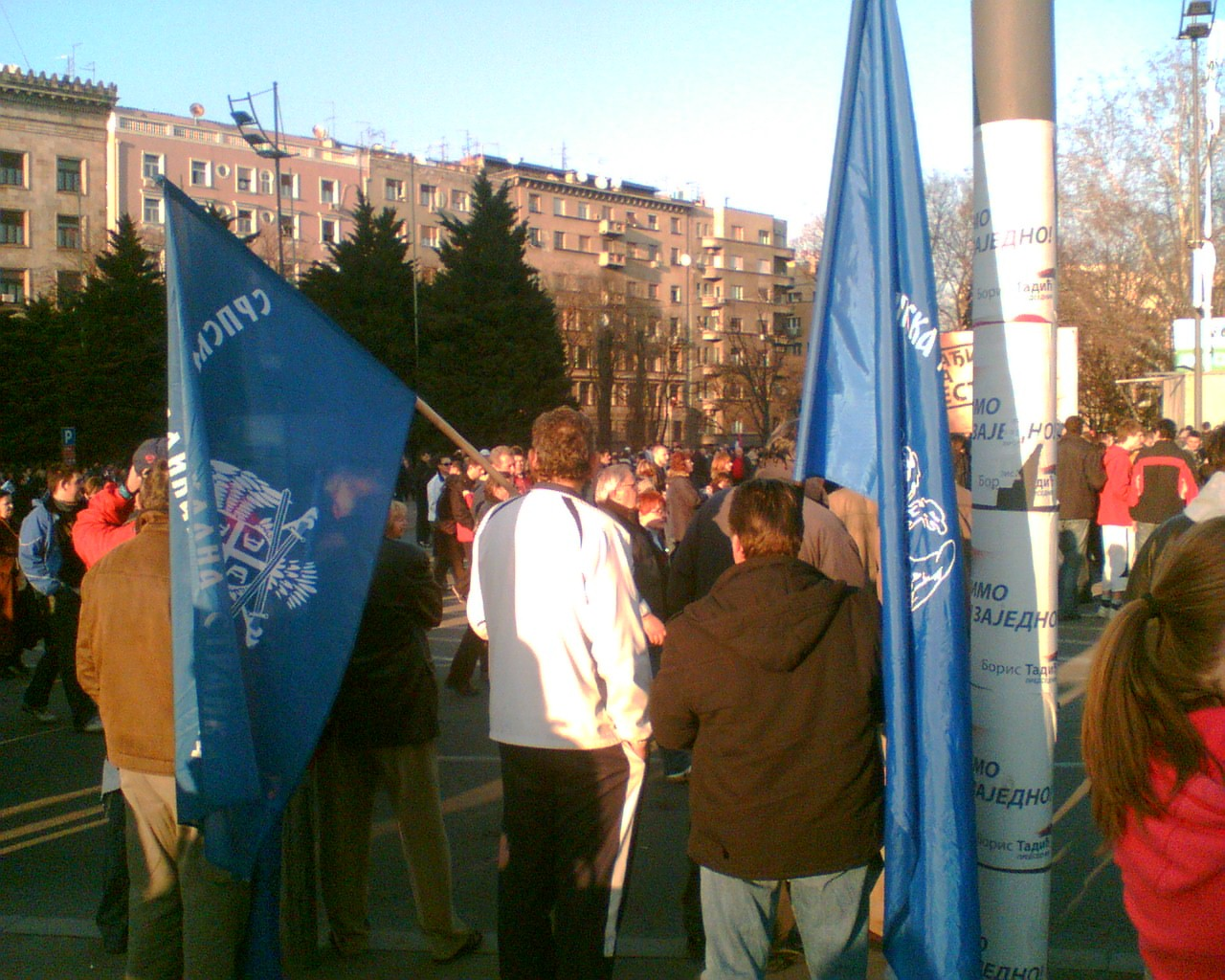
SRS supporters demonstrating against Kosovo's declaration of independence, Belgrade, 2008

On February 21, a very large demonstration called Kosovo is Serbia (Косово је Србија, Kosovo je Srbija) was held in Belgrade in front of the Parliament organized by the Serbian government, with up to hundreds of thousands people attending it. Speakers at the protest were: Prime Minister Vojislav Koštunica, opposition leader Tomislav Nikolić, Republika Srpska Prime Minister Milorad Dodik, Montenegro opposition leader Andrija Mandić, Montenegro opposition politician Predrag Popović, basketball player Dejan Bodiroga, filmmaker Emir Kusturica, tennis player Novak Djokovic (via link), actors Ivana Žigon, Nenad Jezdić and Nataša Tapušković, and Yugoslav crown prince Alexander Karađorđević.

After the protest, people gathered at the Temple of Saint Sava for a religious service, where a speech was held by acting head of the Serbian Orthodox Church, Metropolitan Archbishop Amfilohije Risto Radović of Montenegro and the Littoral.

The president of Serbia and commander-in-chief of Serbian Armed Forces, Boris Tadic (Democratic Party), did not attend. The rally was not supported by the Liberal Democratic Party nor by the League of Social Democrats of Vojvodina, both of which are represented in Parliament.

==== Attacks on diplomatic missions and businesses ====
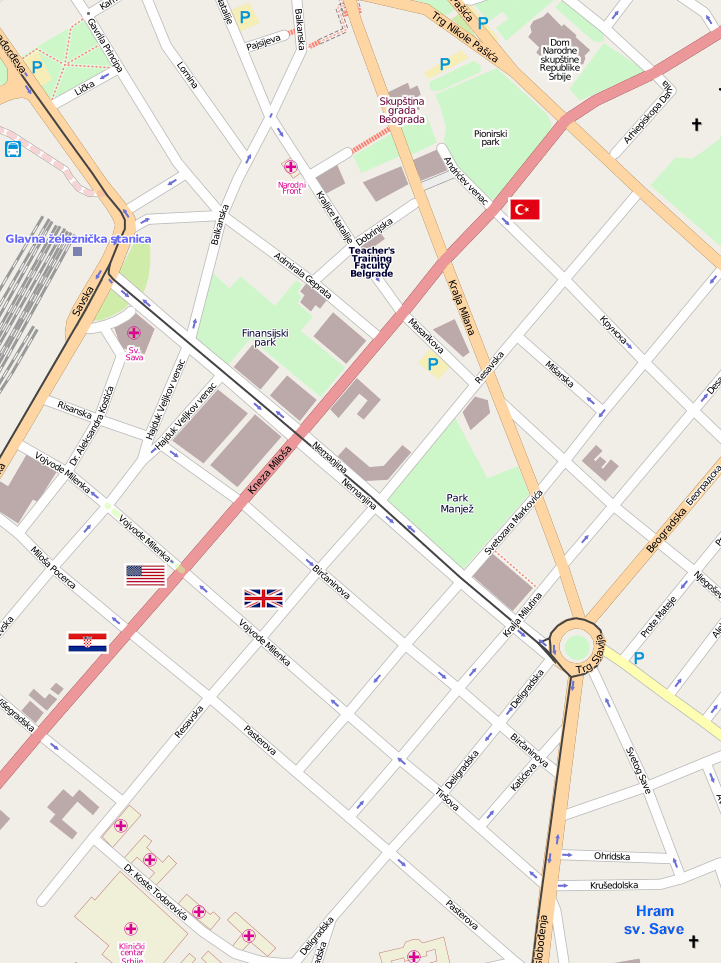
Map of the attacked embassies after the rally

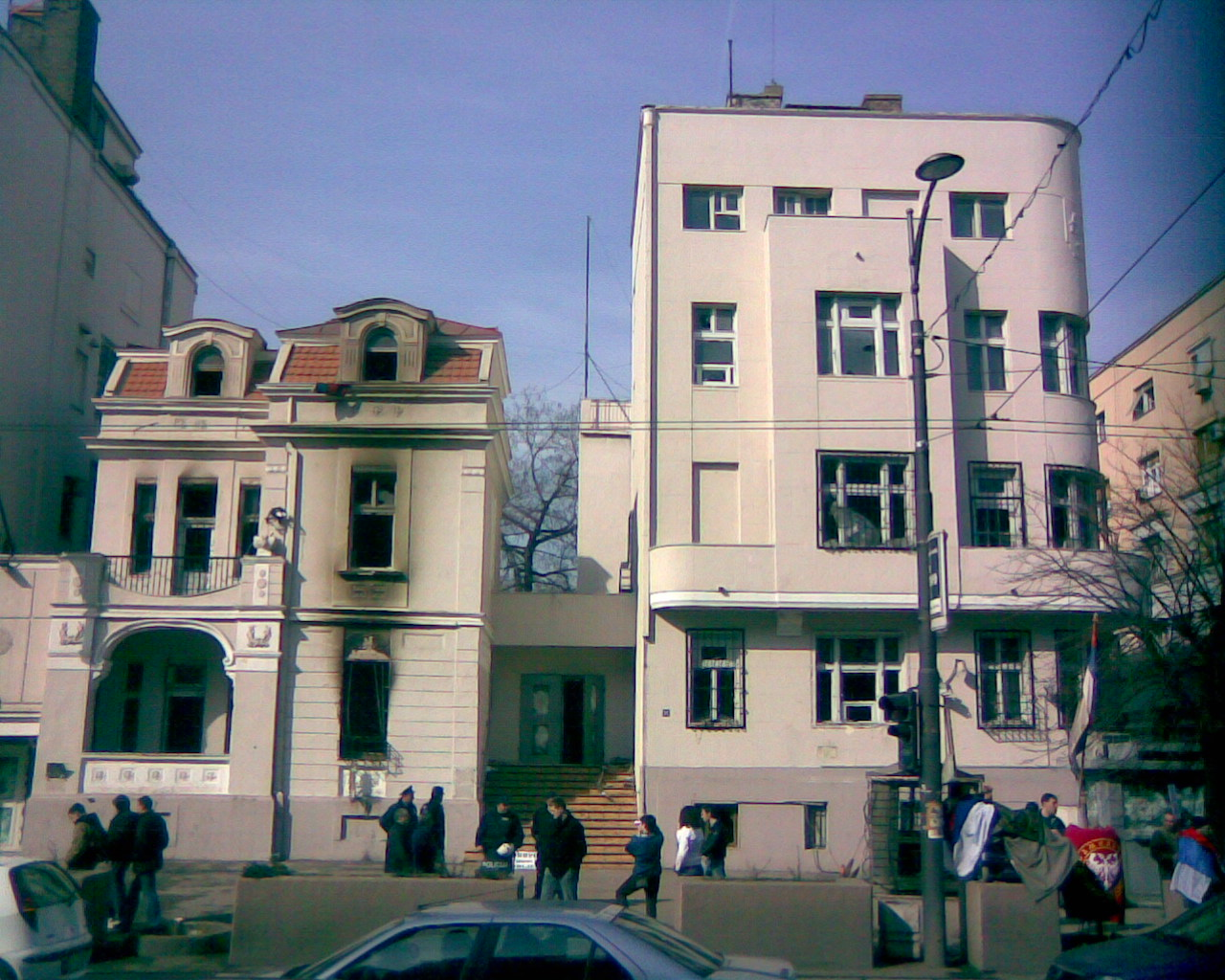
US embassy after Kosovo is Serbia rally on February 21, 2008 in Belgrade

The protest was peaceful until participants arrived at the US, Chinese, Croatian and Slovenian embassies, where a group of about 1000 rioters separated themselves and started attacking the embassies. They burned the US embassy, entered and destroyed the interior and exterior of the Croatian and Chinese embassy and caused minor damage to the Slovenian embassy. The security cameras in the Slovenian embassy also filmed the action outside the embassy where Serbian police didn't try to stop the protesters from entering the embassy, instead they moved away, which caused protests in Slovenia. Emergency services were able to put the fire out in embassies after protesters dissipated. At around 21:00 UTC, CNN reported that "charred remains" of an individual had been found inside the burnt-out offices. Flags of the United States, Croatia, Slovenia and European Union were also burnt.

In response, a group of around fifty Croatian protesters burnt the Serbian flag in central Zagreb, after which the police arrested 44 of them.

Police guarded the U.S. Embassy in Belgrade on February 22.

Other foreign embassies damaged in the course of the protest included those of Belgium, Germany and Turkey. In Belgrade and Novi Sad, McDonald's shops were damaged by protesters. According to Serbian sources, the violent protesters were ad hoc football fans. 54 policemen and 34 citizens were injured. A Dutch journalist suffered broken ribs. Serbian politicians condemned the violence. The total damage from the violence was estimated at over 8 million Serbian dinars ($US 143,000). The United Nations Security Council responded to these incidents by issuing a unanimous statement that, "The members of the Security Council condemn in the strongest terms the mob attacks against embassies in Belgrade, which have resulted in damage to embassy premises and have endangered diplomatic personnel," noting that the 1961 Vienna Convention requires host states to protect embassies. In response to the attacks, the German embassy announced that it would temporarily stop granting visas to Serbian citizens. Also on February 21, Serbian army reservists from Kuršumlija took their protest into Kosovo, during which time they attacked the Kosovo Police Service with stones. An explosive was set off in the Kosovo Serb enclave of Kosovska Mitrovica near a United Nations-run courthouse. During the rally there were people who carried portraits of ICTY-fugitive former Bosnian Serb leader Radovan Karadžić and the blue-red flag of the far-right Orthodox organization Obraz. In Kraljevo, Obraz was responsible for the vandalization of an Evangelical church. In Valjevo, a Slovenian firm Sava Osiguranje was set on fire, most likely by protesting youths. The Radio Television of Serbia took American films and sitcoms off the air, replacing them with content from Spain and Russia, who have been against Kosovo's independence.

=== February 22 ===
The Croatian Ministry of Foreign Affairs and European Integration warned against travelling to Belgrade, resulting in the cancellation of an Adriatic League basketball match between Zagreb's KK Cibona and Belgrade's KK Partizan. A concert by the Croatian band Hladno pivo scheduled for February 29 was similarly cancelled. Also on February 22, the United States embassy in Serbia ordered the temporary evacuation of all non-essential personnel, after the protests and attacks on the embassy. Rian Harris, a U.S. embassy spokeswoman, explained the evacuation to AFP saying that "Dependents are being temporarily ordered to depart Belgrade. We do not have confidence that Serbian authorities can provide security for our staff members." Slovenia also closed its own embassy, recommending its citizens not to travel to Serbia. The European Union froze talks with Serbia on the Stabilisation and Association Agreement, the country's next step in EU-integration. Meanwhile, nationalist organizations were reportedly spreading leaflets urging citizens to boycott banks and goods coming from the countries that support the independence of Kosovo.

=== February 23 ===
The American embassy drew down staffing in Belgrade with a convoy headed to Croatia. By this time, Serbian authorities reported that 200 rioters from the Belgrade protest had been arrested. The Kosovo-Serbia border crossings had also been normalized. The Liberal Democratic Party and the League of Social Democrats of Vojvodina again expressed criticism of Prime Minister Koštunica and his handling of the events since Kosovo's declaration.

=== February 26 ===
Serbia's National Security Council met to discuss how police had failed to stop the mob from attacking the embassy on the 21st.

The United States raised its travel alert for Serbia to a travel warning.

Zoran Vujović, the protester who died during the attack on the U.S. embassy, was buried in Novi Sad on February 26. Several thousand people attended the funeral.

=== February 27 ===
Human Rights Watch said that "Serbia's government should act quickly to reduce the dangerously hostile climate for human rights groups" since the Kosovo declaration.

=== February 28 ===
The largest protest in Valjevo drew a crowd of several thousand people on February 28.

=== February 29 ===
On February 29, Serbian police charged 80 people in connection with the embassy attacks.

== North Kosovo ==
Note on Kosovo independence

- On February 19, Serbian protesters destroyed two UNMIK border checkpoints between Kosovo and Serbia. Serbian minister for Kosovo, Slobodan Samardžić, declared that the act was legitimate and in line with the Serbian government's position. A group called Mlada Bosna (Young Bosnia) also claimed responsibility for a string of hand-grenade attacks after Kosovo's declaration.
- On February 22, NATO's Kosovo Force (KFOR) began blocking entrance into Kosovo from Serbia to those who "threaten public order" after several hundred students from Belgrade, Niš, and Kragujevac attempted to cross in. Despite the blockade, some of the protesters managed to make their way to Kosovska Mitrovica where they took part in clashes against UN police.
- On February 23, BBC News reported that nationalist Serbs were seeking to permanently separate North Kosovo from the Republic of Kosovo, through a strategy of confrontation, sabotage, and low-level violence directed against international institutions. With continued Serb protests in northern Mitrovica, EU staff withdrew from the area.
- On February 24, with the seventh consecutive day of Serb protesting in Mitrovica, protests drew approximately 1000 people. Despite some Serbian media outlets' claim to the contrary, Serbs from North Kosovo have not been leaving the Kosovo Police Service. The United States' ambassador to Serbia called on the country's leaders to do more to protect foreign diplomatic missions.
- On February 25, the protest in Mitrovica drew 2,000 people, during which an EU flag was burnt. On the Kosovo-Serbia border, 19 Kosovo police officers were injured by Serb protesters, before receiving additional help from NATO peacekeepers who dispersed the group.
- On February 26, protests continued in Mitrovica where students staged a mock football game in which one team represented Serbia and the other team states which have recognized Kosovo.
- Protests in Mitrovica drew thousands on March 6, as well as several hundred in Gračanica, including suspended Serb policemen of KPS.
- On March 14, 2008, after staging rallies for several weeks that prevented ethnic Albanian court employees from entering a UN courthouse in the northern part of Kosovska Mitrovica, hundreds of Kosovo Serbs broke into the building in the Serb-dominated part of the city, forcing UN police to retreat. UN officials' negotiations with the Serbs to end the occupation were unsuccessful, and on March 17 UN police with the assistance of NATO-led KFOR forces entered the courthouse in a pre-dawn raid. When they arrived they were pelted with stones by around 100 Serbs. When they came out after arresting 53 of the protesters inside the courthouse they were attacked with gunfire, grenades and rocks by several hundred protesters who had massed outside. About half of the protesters who had been arrested were freed by fellow protesters during the clashes with the rest being released by the UN after questioning. The clashes lasted until around noon. One Ukrainian police officer was killed, 70 Serbs and 61 UN and NATO peacekeepers were wounded, and one UN vehicle and one NATO truck were set ablaze. Among the wounded international troops were 27 Polish and 14 Ukrainian police officers and 20 French soldiers. UN police withdrew from northern Mitrovica, leaving the area under the control of the NATO forces.
- Gen. John Craddock, NATO's top commander, said that after speaking with NATO commanders in Kosovo that NATO did not feel it necessary to send reinforcements to Kosovo. On 19 March, UN police began to patrol parts of north Mitrovica again together with local Kosovo police, while the NATO peacekeepers still remained in overall control of security at the courthouse and generally in the north of Kosovo. A gradual transition to civilian control will happen over the next days.

== Bosnia and Herzegovina ==
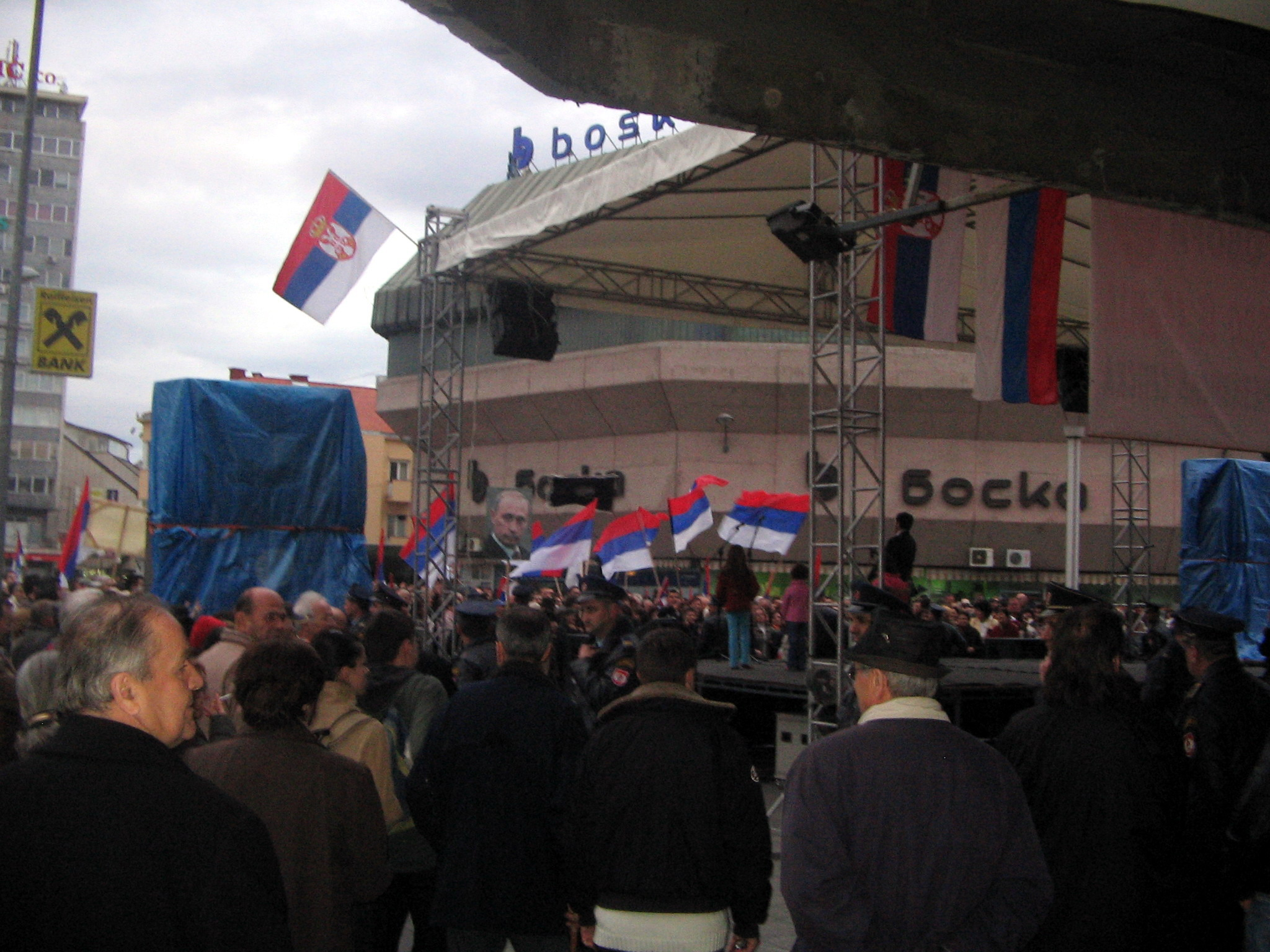
Protests after Kosovo's declaration of independence in Banja Luka, Republika Srpska, Bosnia and Herzegovina.

Protests were held in Republika Srpska, the Serb-inhabited entity of Bosnia and Herzegovina. On the 26th, about 10,000 protested in Banja Luka; a small group of them later approached the U.S. embassy branch office, damaging shopfronts and stoning police who blocked their path. Eventually, they were dispersed by tear gas.

== Montenegro ==
On October 9, 2008, Montenegro recognized Kosovo's independence. This move by the Montenegrin government, opposed by many in the country, led to a protest rally in Podgorica on October 13 attended by over 20,000 people. The rally, held in front of the Parliament of Montenegro building, was organized by the Serb List, Socialist People's Party of Montenegro, People's Party, Democratic Serb Party of Montenegro, and other opposition parties. It was backed by Movement for Changes and the Metropolitanate of Montenegro and the Littoral of the Serbian Orthodox Church, and Metropolitan Amfilohije Radović was announced as speaker. Demonstrators demanded that the Montenegrin government and Prime Minister Milo Đukanović rescind their recognition of Kosovo. They waved Serbian flags, chanting "Kosovo is Serbia" and other slogans against the prime minister and his cabinet, calling them ustashas and shiptars. At the end of the rally, riots broke out and small groups attacked riot police in front of the parliament building. The rioters were eventually driven back by police, and 28 people were arrested and 34 were injured. The pro-Serbian opposition planned a second protest on 16 October, but the Montenegrin police said that no protests from the opposition would be accepted.

== Diaspora ==
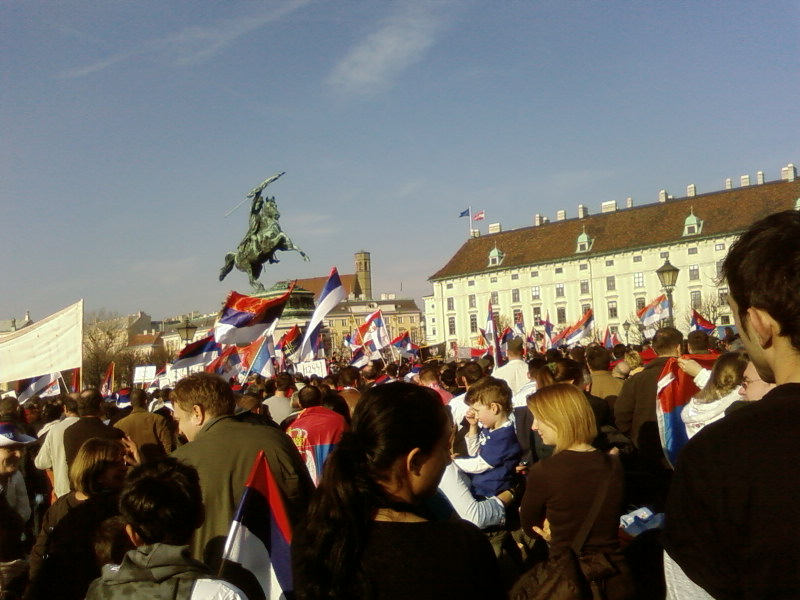
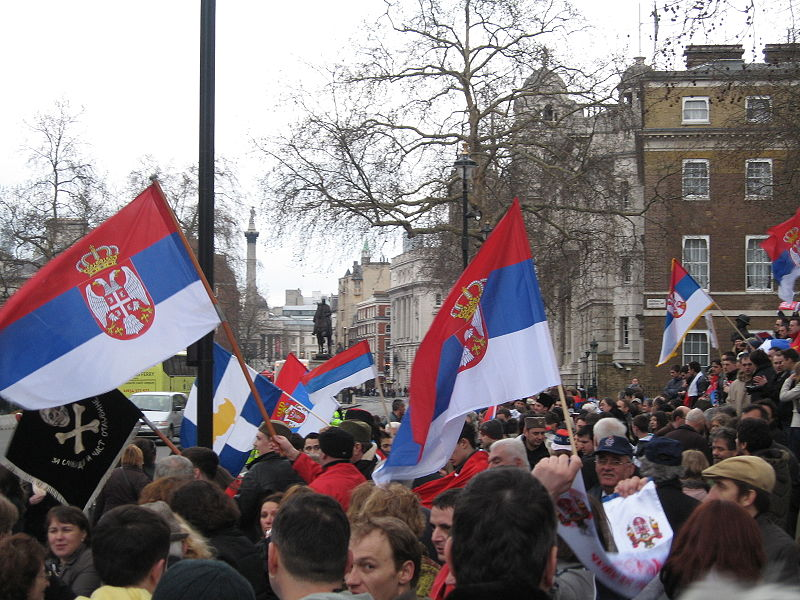
Serbs protesting in Vienna (left) and London (right) in February, 2008.

Protests were also held in diaspora communities, such as in London (23 February), Vienna (24 February), and by Serbian students in Brussels on 28 February.

== See also ==
- 2008 unrest in Kosovo, following the declaration
