= Kosovo Force =

NATO-led international peacekeeping force

- The emblem of KFOR, which contains the Latin and Cyrillic scripts.
- Founded: 11 June 1999; 27 years ago
- Type: Command
- Role: NATO peacekeeping
- Size: 5,249 military personnel
- Part of: NATO (United Nations) UNMIK
- Nickname: "KFOR"
- Engagements: Yugoslav Wars
- Website: jfcnaples.nato.int/kfor

Commanders
- Commander: Major general Roberto Vergori, Italy Armed Forces
- Deputy Commander: Brigade-general Cahit İrican, Turkish Armed Forces
- Chief of Staff: RDML Maximilian Clark, US Navy
- Command Sergeant Major: Command sergeant major Ahmet Cemalettin Tokur, Turkish Armed Forces

Insignia
- Flag

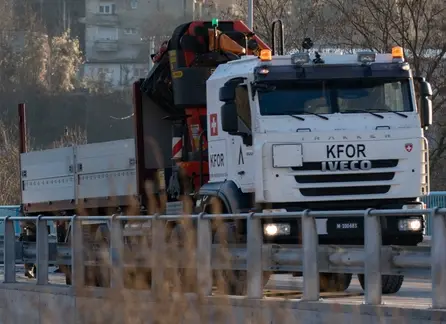
Iveco Trakker truck used by the KFOR in 2024

The Kosovo Force (KFOR) is a NATO-led international peacekeeping military force in Kosovo. The mandate of KFOR is based on United Nations Security Council Resolution 1244 and the Kumanovo Military-Technical Agreement, both which entered into force in June 1999. KFOR is the third security responder, after the Kosovo Police and the EU Rule of Law (EULEX) mission, respectively, with whom NATO peacekeeping forces work in close coordination. Its operations are gradually reducing until the Kosovo Security Force, established in 2009, becomes self-sufficient.

KFOR entered Kosovo on 12 June 1999, one day after the United Nations Security Council adopted the UNSC Resolution 1244. At the time, Kosovo was facing a grave humanitarian crisis, with the Yugoslav Army in action against the Kosovo Liberation Army (KLA) in daily engagements. Nearly one million people had fled Kosovo as refugees by that time, many of whom left permanently.

Currently, 33 states contribute to the KFOR, with a combined strength of 5,249 military personnel.

== Objectives ==
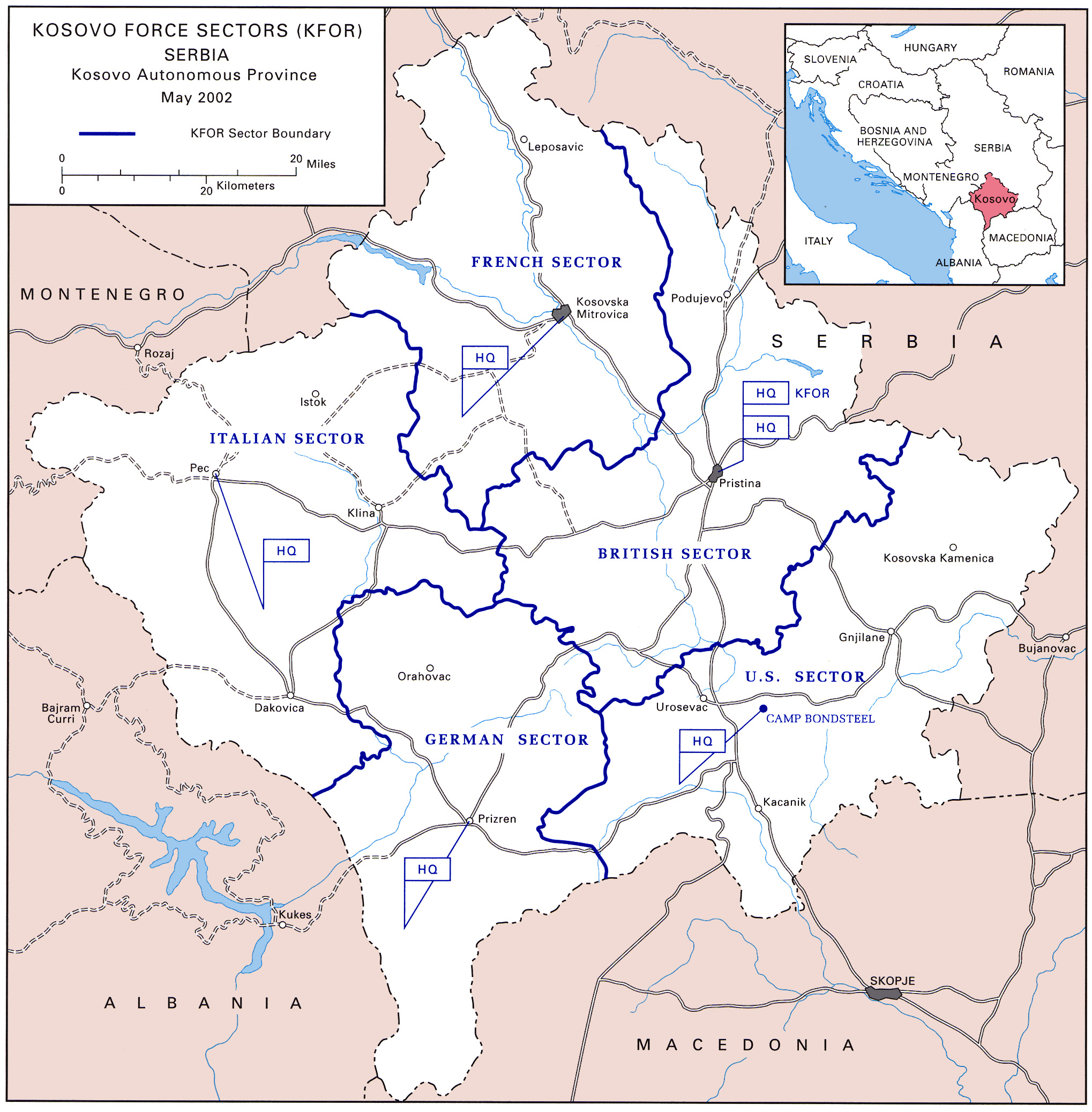
Map of the KFOR's sectors in 2002

KFOR focuses on building a secure environment and guaranteeing the freedom of movement through all Kosovo territory for all citizens, irrespective of their ethnic origins, in accordance with UN Security Council Resolution 1244.

The Contact Group countries have said publicly that KFOR will remain in Kosovo to provide the security necessary to support the final settlement of Kosovo authorities.

== Structure ==
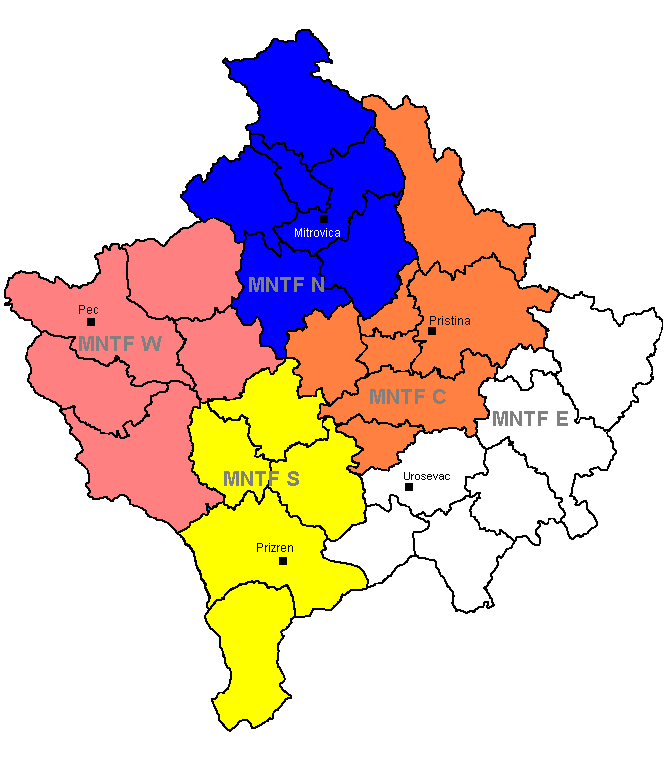
KFOR Task Forces in 2006

KFOR contingents were grouped into five multinational brigades and a lead nation designated for each multinational brigade. All national contingents pursued the same objective to maintain a secure environment in Kosovo.

In August 2005, the North Atlantic Council decided to restructure KFOR, replacing the five existing multinational brigades with five task forces, to allow for greater flexibility with, removing restrictions on the cross-boundary movement of units based in different sectors of Kosovo. Then in February 2010, the Multinational Task Forces became Multinational Battle Groups, and in March 2011, KFOR was restructured again, into just two multinational battlegroups; one based at Camp Bondsteel, and one based at Peja.

In August 2019, the KFOR structure was streamlined. Under the new structure, the former Multinational Battlegroups are reflagged as Regional Commands, with Regional Command-East (RC-E) based at Camp Bondsteel, and Regional Command-West (RC-W) based at Camp Villaggio Italia.

=== Structure 1999 ===
The Kosovo Force headquarters was built around the Allied Rapid Reaction Corps, based in Pristina.

- Multinational Brigade Center (MNB-C), at Pristina – UK led 4th Armoured Brigade
  - King's Royal Hussars
  - 1st Battalion, Irish Guards
  - Canadian 1st Battalion, Princess Patricia's Canadian Light Infantry
  - Swedish Battalion
  - Finnish Battalion
  - Norwegian Telemark Battalion
- Multinational Brigade-North (MNB-N), at Mitrovica – French led 2nd Armoured Brigade
  - 501st–503rd Combat Tank Regiment
  - 21st Marine Infantry Regiment
  - Belgian battalion
  - Danish battalion
  - Russian battalion
  - UAE battalion
- Multinational Brigade West (MNB-W), at Peja – Italian led Bersaglieri Brigade "Garibaldi"
  - Regiment "Cavalleggeri Guide" (19th)
  - 18th Bersaglieri Regiment
  - Spanish 7th Battalion, 3rd Tercio "Juan de Austria"
  - Portuguese Battalion
- Multinational Brigade South (MNB-S), at Prizren – German led 12th Panzer Brigade
  - Panzergrenadier Battalion 112
  - Austrian Battalion
  - Dutch Battalion
  - Turkish Battalion
  - Russian Battalion
- Multinational Brigade East (MNB-E), at Camp Bondsteel, – US led 2nd Brigade, 1st Infantry Division known as Task Force Falcon
  - 1st Battalion, 77th Armor
  - 1st Battalion, 26th Infantry
  - 2nd Battalion, 505th Infantry
  - Russian 13th Tactical Group
  - Greek 501st Mechanized Infantry Battalion
  - Polish 18th Air Assault Battalion
  - Ukrainian Helicopter / Infantry Detachment
  - United Arab Emirates Contingent

=== Structure 2023 ===
- Kosovo Force, at Camp Film City, Pristina
    - Headquarters Support Group (HSG), at Camp Film City;
    - Joint Logistics Support Group (JLSG), in Pristina (Logistics and engineering support)
    - Intelligence Surveillance and Reconnaissance Battalion (ISRBN), at Camp Film City (Multinational and Led by Italian Army)
  - Regional Command-East (RC-E), at Camp Bondsteel near Ferizaj (U.S. Army force supported by Greece, Italy, Finland, Hungary, Poland, Slovenia, Switzerland and Turkey)
  - Regional Command-West (RC-W), at Camp Villaggio Italia near Peja (Italian Army force supported by Austria, Croatia, Moldova, North Macedonia, Poland, Slovenia, Switzerland and Turkey)
  - Multinational Specialized Unit (MSU), in Pristina (Military Police, crowd and riot control, peacekeeping operations regiment lead by Italian Carabinieri)
  - KFOR Tactical Reserve Battalion (KTRBN), at Camp Novo Selo, near Vushtrri (Multinational and Led by Hungarian Army)
- Kosovo Force Office, at Skopje International Airport

== Contributing states ==
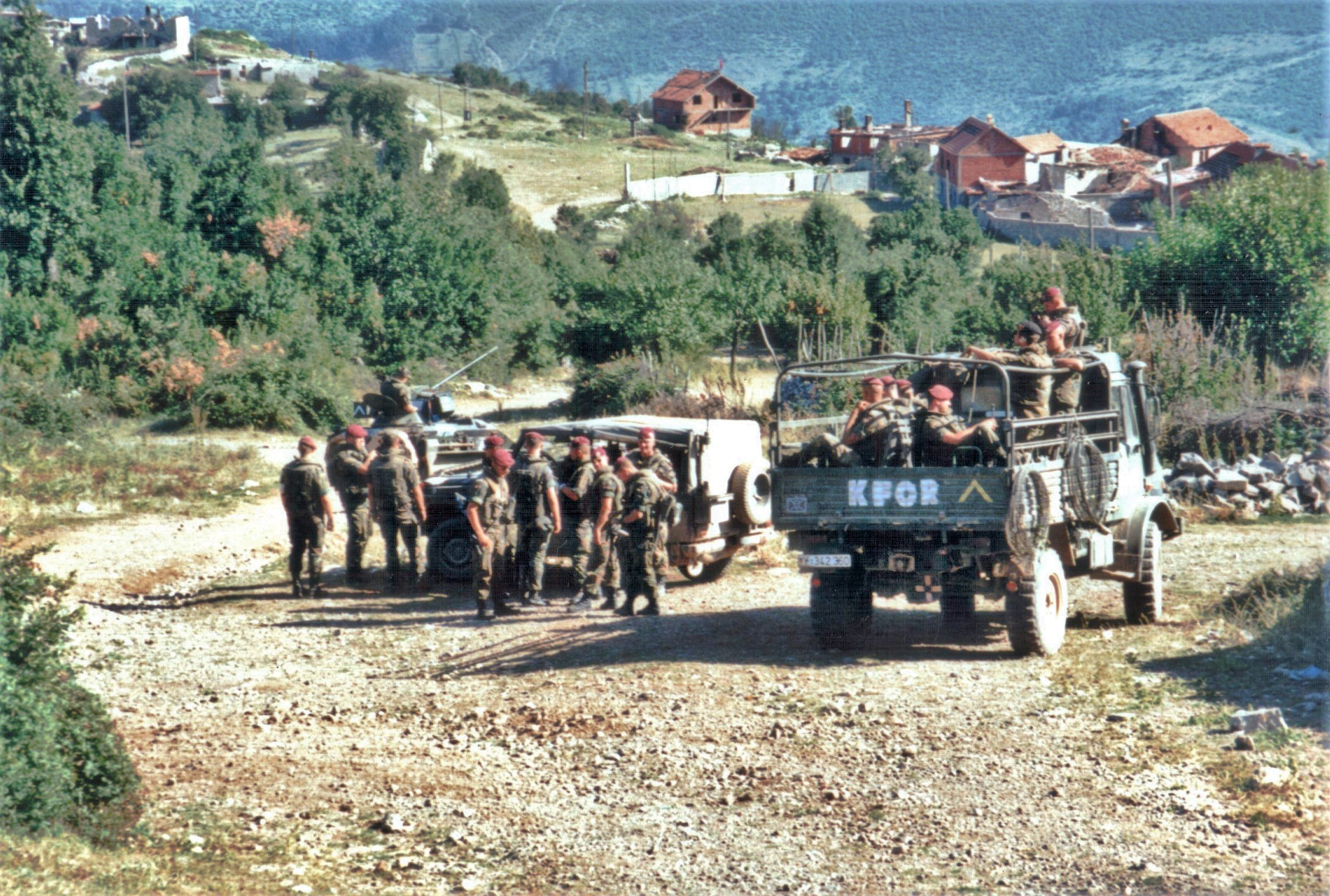
German Armed Forces KFOR soldiers patrol southern Kosovo in 1999

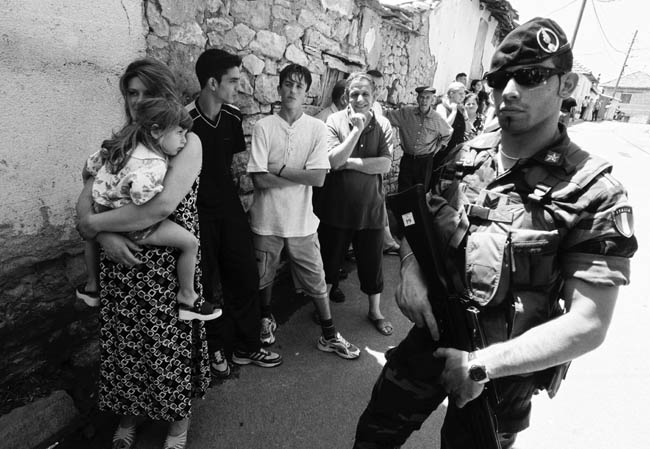
Italian Army KFOR soldier protecting Serb civilians in Orahovac during the 2004 unrest

Turkish Land Forces KFOR soldiers in riot training (2010)

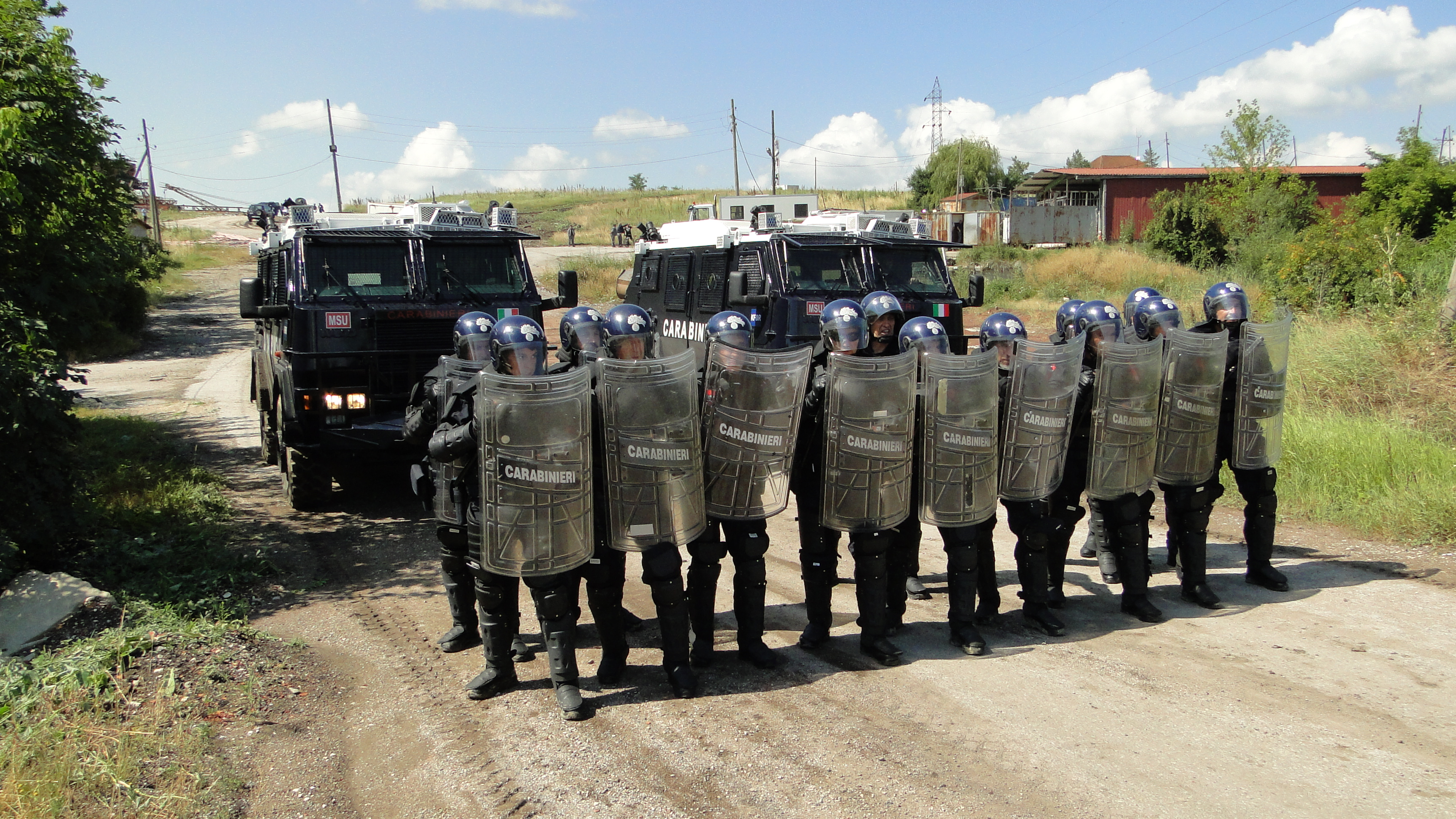
KFOR-MSU Carabinieri with two RG-12 during a crowd and riot control exercise (2019)

At its height, KFOR troops consisted of 50,000 men and women coming from 39 different NATO and non-NATO nations. The official KFOR website indicated that in 2008 a total 14,000 soldiers from 34 countries were participating in KFOR. The following list shows the number of troops which have participated in the KFOR mission. Most of the force has been downsized since 2008; current numbers are reflected here as well:

Active
Country	Membership		Strength
Country	NATO	EU	Strength
Albania	Yes	No	126
Armenia	No	No	57
Austria	No	Yes	150
Belgium	Yes	Yes	3
Bulgaria	Yes	Yes	125
Canada	Yes	No	5
Croatia	Yes	Yes	151
Czech Republic	Yes	Yes	36
Denmark	Yes	Yes	35
Finland	Yes	Yes	70
France	Yes	Yes	4
Germany	Yes	Yes	308
Greece	Yes	Yes	121
Hungary	Yes	Yes	408
Ireland	No	Yes	13
Italy	Yes	Yes	907
Latvia	Yes	Yes	142
Lithuania	Yes	Yes	44
Moldova	No	No	44
Montenegro	Yes	No	2
North Macedonia	Yes	No	70
Poland	Yes	Yes	247
Portugal	Yes	Yes	1
Romania	Yes	Yes	188
Slovakia	Yes	Yes	42
Slovenia	Yes	Yes	108
Sweden	Yes	Yes	3
Switzerland	No	No	200
Turkey	Yes	No	382
United Kingdom	Yes	No	46
United States	Yes	No	590
31	26	21	4,657

Withdrawn
Country	Membership		Year of withdrawal
Country	NATO	EU	Year of withdrawal
Argentina	No	No	2006
Azerbaijan	No	No	2008
Estonia	Yes	Yes	2018
Georgia	No	No	2008
Mongolia	No	No	2006
Morocco	No	No	2014
Norway	Yes	No	2020
Russia	No	No	2003
Spain	Yes	Yes	2009
Ukraine	No	No	2022
United Arab Emirates	No	No	2001

== KFOR commanders ==
1. Sir Michael Jackson (United Kingdom, 10 June 1999 – 8 October 1999)
2. Klaus Reinhardt (Germany, 8 October 1999 – 18 April 2000)
3. Juan Ortuño Such (Spain, 18 April 2000 – 16 October 2000)
4. Carlo Cabigiosu (Italy, 16 October 2000 - 6 April 2001)
5. Thorstein Skiaker (Norway, 6 April 2001 – 3 October 2001)
6. Marcel Valentin (France, 3 October 2001 – 4 October 2002)
7. Fabio Mini (Italy, 4 October 2002 – 3 October 2003)
8. Holger Kammerhoff (Germany, 3 October 2003 – 1 September 2004)
9. Yves de Kermabon (France, 1 September 2004 – 1 September 2005)
10. Giuseppe Valotto (Italy, 1 September 2005 – 1 September 2006)
11. Roland Kather (Germany, 1 September 2006 – 31 August 2007)
12. Xavier de Marnhac (France, 31 August 2007 – 29 August 2008)
13. Giuseppe Emilio Gay (Italy, 29 August 2008 – 8 September 2009)
14. Markus J. Bentler (Germany, 8 September 2009 – 1 September 2010)
15. Erhard Bühler (Germany, 1 September 2010 – 9 September 2011)
16. Erhard Drews (Germany, 9 September 2011 – 7 September 2012)
17. Volker Halbauer (Germany, 7 September 2012 – 6 September 2013)
18. Salvatore Farina (Italy, 6 September 2013 – 3 September 2014)
19. Francesco Paolo Figliuolo (Italy, 3 September 2014 – 7 August 2015)
20. Guglielmo Luigi Miglietta (Italy, 7 August 2015 – 1 September 2016)
21. Giovanni Fungo (Italy, 1 September 2016 – 15 November 2017)
22. Salvatore Cuoci (Italy, 15 November 2017 – 28 November 2018)
23. Lorenzo D'Addario (Italy, 28 November 2018 – 19 November 2019)
24. Michele Risi (Italy, 19 November 2019 – 13 November 2020 )
25. Franco Federici (Italy, 13 November 2020 – 15 October 2021)
26. Ferenc Kajári (Hungary, 15 October 2021 – 14 October 2022 )
27. Angelo Michele Ristuccia (Italy, 14 October 2022 – 10 October 2023 )
28. Özkan Ulutaş (Turkey, 10 October 2023 – 10 October 2024)
29. Enrico Barduani (Italy, 11 October 2024 – 3 October 2025)
30. Özkan Ulutaş (Turkey, 3 October 2025 – 14 October 2026)
31. Roberto Vergori (Italy, 14 October 2026 – )

Note: The terms of service are based on the official list of the KFOR commanders and another article. https://jfcnaples.nato.int/kfor/about-us/history/kfor-commanders

== Kosovo peacekeeping ==
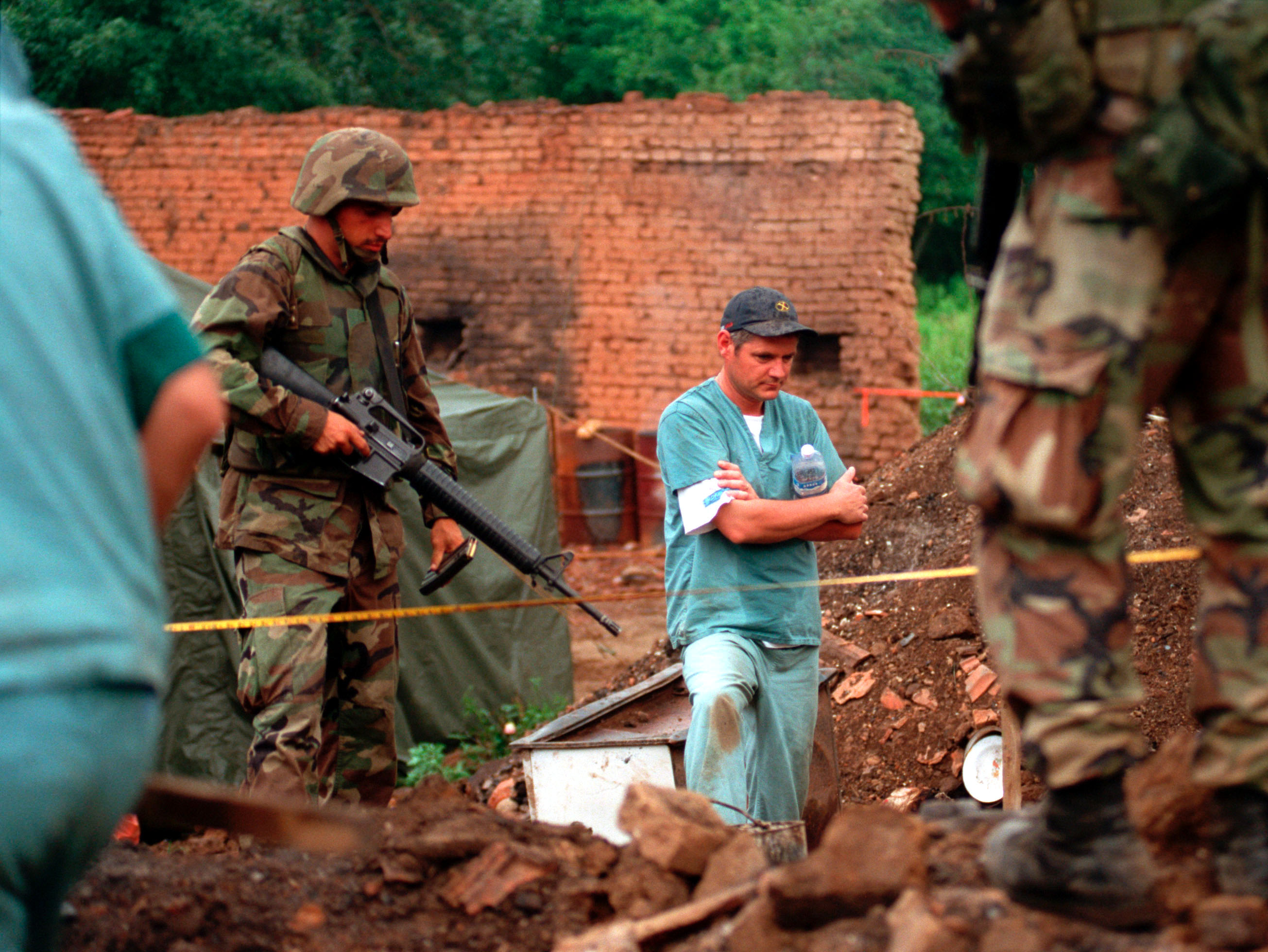
Marines from the U.S. provide security for Canadian policemen as they investigate a mass grave in July 1999.

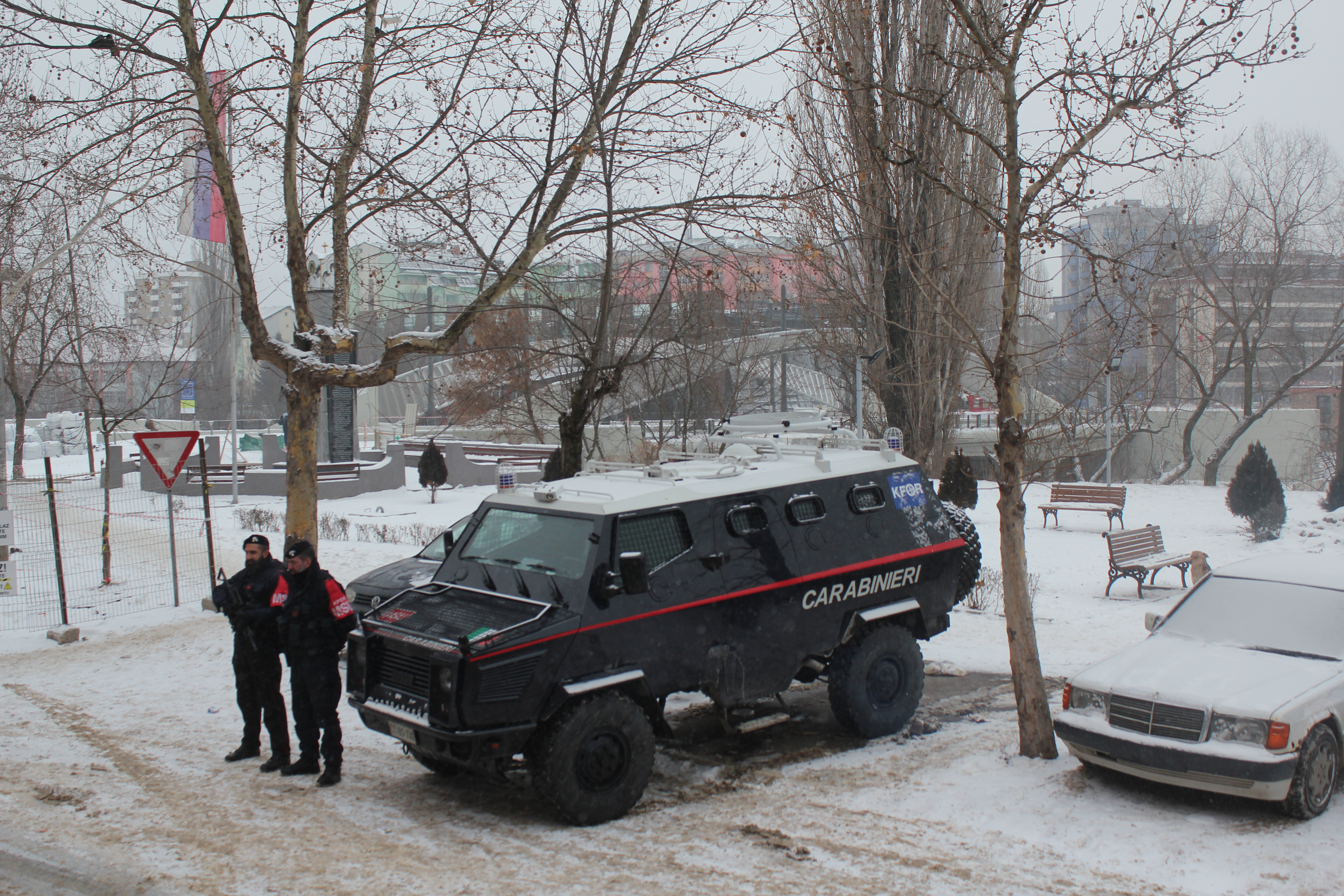
KFOR-MSU Carabinieri patrol in Mitrovica near the New Bridge (2018).

=== Events ===
On 9 June 1999 the Military Technical Agreement or Kumanovo Agreement between KFOR and the Governments of the Federal Republic of Yugoslavia and the Republic of Serbia was signed by NATO General Sir Mike Jackson and Yugoslavia Colonel General Svetozar Marjanovic concluding the Kosovo War. This agreement outlined a rapid withdrawal of Federal Republic of Yugoslavia Forces from Kosovo, assigning to the KFOR Commander the airspace control over Kosovo and pending the later United Nations Security Council Resolution's approval, the deployment of KFOR to Kosovo. On 10 June 1999 the United Nations Security Council adopted the UNSC Resolution 1244 authorizing the deployment in Kosovo of an international civil and security presence for an initial period of 12 months, and to continue thereafter unless the UNSC decides otherwise. The civil presence was represented by the United Nations Mission In Kosovo (UNMIK), while the security presence was led by KFOR.

Following the adoption of UNSCR 1244, General Jackson, acting on the instructions of the North Atlantic Council, made immediate preparations for the rapid deployment of the security force (Operation Joint Guardian), mandated by the United Nations Security Council. The first NATO-led elements entered Kosovo at 5 a.m. on 12 June. On 21 June, the UCK undertaking of demilitarization and transformation was signed by COMKFOR and the Commander in Chief of the UCK (Mr. Hashim Thaci), moving KFOR into a new phase of enforcing the peace and supporting the implementation of a civil administration under the auspices of the United Nations.

Within three weeks of KFOR entry, more than half a million out of those who had left during the bombing were back in Kosovo. However, in the months following KFOR deployment, approximately 150,000 Serbs, Romani and other non-Albanians fled Kosovo while many of the remaining civilians were subjected to violence and intimidation from ethnic Albanians.

October 28, 2000 the first Municipal Assembly Elections were held. The Organization for Security and Cooperation in Europe(OSCE) announced that approximately 80% of the population participated in this vote for local representatives. The final results were certified by the Special Representative for Kosovo of the UN Secretary-General, Bernard Kouchner, on 7 November.

KFOR was initially composed of 40,000 troops from NATO countries. Troop levels were reduced to 26,000 by June 2003, then to 17,500 by the end that year. Combat troops were reduced more than support troops. KFOR tried to deal with this by transferring tasks to UNMIK and the Kosovo Police Service (KPS), but UNMIK was also reducing its number of international police, and KPS were not numerous enough or competent enough to take over from KFOR.

The 2004 unrest in Kosovo was the worst ethnic violence since 1999, leaving hundreds wounded and at least 14 people dead. On 17 and 18 March 2004, a wave of violent riots swept through Kosovo, triggered by two incidents perceived as ethnically motivated acts. The first incident, on 15 March 2004, an 18-year-old Serb was shot near the all Serb village of Čaglavica, near Pristina. On 16 March, three Albanian children drowned in the Ibar River in the village of Čabar, near the Serb community of Zubin Potok. A fourth boy survived. It was speculated that he and his friends had been chased into the river by Serbs in revenge for the shooting of Ivić the previous day, but this claim has not been proven. According to Human Rights Watch, the violence in March 2004 left 19 dead, 954 wounded, 550 homes destroyed, twenty-seven Orthodox churches and monasteries burned, and leaving approximately 4,100 Serbs, Roma, Ashkali (Albanian-speaking Roma), and other non-Albanian minorities displaced. Nineteen people, eight Kosovo Serbs and eleven Kosovo Albanians, were killed and over a thousand wounded-including more than 120 KFOR soldiers and UNMIK police officers, and fifty-eight Kosovo Police Service (KPS) officers.

The 10 February 2007 protest in Kosovo resulted in 2 deaths and many injuries. A crowd of ethnic Albanians in Pristina protested against a UN plan, also known as the Ahtisaari Plan, they felt fell short of granting full independence for Kosovo. The proposals, unveiled 2 February, recommended a form of self-rule and was strongly opposed by Serbia. The UN Security Council did not endorse the plan.

On February 17, 2008 unrest followed Kosovo's declaration of independence . Some Kosovo Serbs opposed to secession boycotted the move by refusing to follow orders from the central government in Pristina and attempted to seize infrastructure and border posts in Serb-populated regions. There were also sporadic instances of violence against international institutions and governmental institutions, predominantly in North Kosovo. After declaring independence, the Kosovo government introduced new customs stamps, a symbol of their newly declared sovereignty. Serbia refused to recognize the customs stamps which led to the de facto prohibition of both direct import of goods from Kosovo to Serbia, as well as transit to third countries. Goods from Serbia, however, could still be freely imported into Kosovo. Pursuant to the Statement by the President of the Security Council on 26 November 2008 (S/PRST/2008/44), UNMIK was restructured and its rule of law executive tasks were transferred to EULEX. EULEX maintains a limited residual capability as a second security responder and provides continued support to Kosovo Police's crowd and riot control capability.

The 25 August 2009 Pristina protests resulted in vehicle damages and multiple injuries.

On 22 July 2010, the International Court of Justice delivered its advisory opinion on Kosovo's declaration of independence declaring that "the adoption of the declaration of independence of the 17 February 2008 did not violate general international law because international law contains no 'prohibition on declarations of independence'," nor did the adoption of the declaration of independence violate UN Security Council Resolution 1244, since this did not describe Kosovo's final status, nor had the Security Council reserved for itself the decision on final status.

20 July 2011 Kosovo banned all imports from Serbia and introduced 10 percent tax for imports from Bosnia as both countries blocked exports from Kosovo. On 26 July 2011, a series of confrontations in North Kosovo began with a Kosovo Police operation to seize two border outposts along the Kosovo Serbia border and consequent clashes continued until 23 November. The clashes, resulting in multiple deaths and injuries, were over differences between who would administer the border crossings between Kosovo and Serbia along with what would happen with the revenue collected from the customs and removal of roadblocks to secure freedom of movement. On 3 September 2011, a deal to unblock the impasse between Serbia and Kosovo over exports was struck at EU-led negotiations in Brussels. Serbia agreed to accept goods marked “Kosovo Customs”, while Pristina gave up including state emblems, coats of arms, flags, or use of the word “republic” allowing Kosovo to interpret the label as referring to the customs of independent Kosovo, whereas Serbia could see it as a provincial customs label.

On 14 and 15 February 2012, an advisory referendum on accepting the institutions of the Republic of Kosovo was held in North Kosovo. 1 June 2012 Kosovo Serbs and a KFOR soldier were wounded when peacekeepers tried to dismantle Serb barricades, among the last on major roads yet to be dismantled, blocking traffic.

On 8 February 2013, a series of protests began against increases in electricity bills which later turned into protests against corruption. On 19 April 2013, the Belgrade Pristina Normalization Agreement was signed between the governments of Kosovo and Serbia. Prior, North Kosovo functioned independently from the institutions in Kosovo by refusing to recognize Kosovo's 2008 declaration of independence and the Government of Kosovo opposed any parallel government for Serbs. The Brussels Agreement abolished the parallel structures and both governments agreed upon creating a Community of Serb Municipalities. The association was expected to be officially formed in 2016 but continued discussions has resulted in not forming the Community. By signing the Agreement, the European Union's Commission considered Serbia had met key steps in its relations with Kosovo and recommended that negotiations for accession of Serbia to the European Union be opened. Several days after the agreement was reached, the European Commission recommended authorizing the launch of negotiations between the EU and Kosovo on the Stabilisation and Association Process.

The 2014 student protest in Kosovo demanded the resignation or dismissal of the University of Pristina Rector. Students threw red paint and rocks at the Kosovo Police who responded with tear gas. 30 Kosovo Police officers were injured and more than 30 students were arrested. The upper airspace over Kosovo, skies over 10,000 feet, was re-opened for civilian traffic overflights on 3 April 2014. This followed a decision by the North Atlantic Council to accept the offer by the Government of Hungary to act as a technical enabler through its national air navigation service provider, Hungarocontrol.

The 2015 Kosovo protests were a series of violent protests calling for the resignation of a Minister and the passage of a bill on Trepca Mines ownership. On 6 January protestors claiming that among the pilgrims visiting a local church for Orthodox Christmas included displaced Serbs from Gjakova involved in war crimes against Albanians in 1998-1999 threw blocks of ice at the bus breaking one of its windows. Kosovo Police arrested two protestors. The Minister For Community and Return, who accompanied the pilgrims, made a statement that was perceived by Kosovo Albanians as an ethnic slur leading to riots. The rioters, which included students and opposition parties, demanded his resignation and he was dismissed by the Kosovo Prime Minister. The Kosovo government's announcement it was postponing a decision on the privatization process of the Trepca mining complex after Serb Kosovo Parliamentary Representatives protested claiming that the Serbian government had the right to retain ownership was met with student-led protests in Pristina, Lipljan and Ferizaj/Urosevac, Kosovo Albanian Miners in South Trepca and Kosovo Serbian Miners in North Trepca. Trepca's lead, zinc, and silver mines once accounted for 75 percent of the mineral wealth of socialist Yugoslavia, employing 20,000 people. Trepca now operates at a minimum level to keep the mines alive employing several thousand miners. The Trepca mines are under the oversight of the Kosovo Privatization Agency.

9 January 2016, thousands of protestors wanted the government to withdraw from a border demarcation agreement with Montenegro and an agreement to set up a Community of Serb Municipalities. Police fired tear gas responding to protesters who threw Molotov cocktails and set fire to a government building. The Kosovo Assembly later withdrew the agreements.

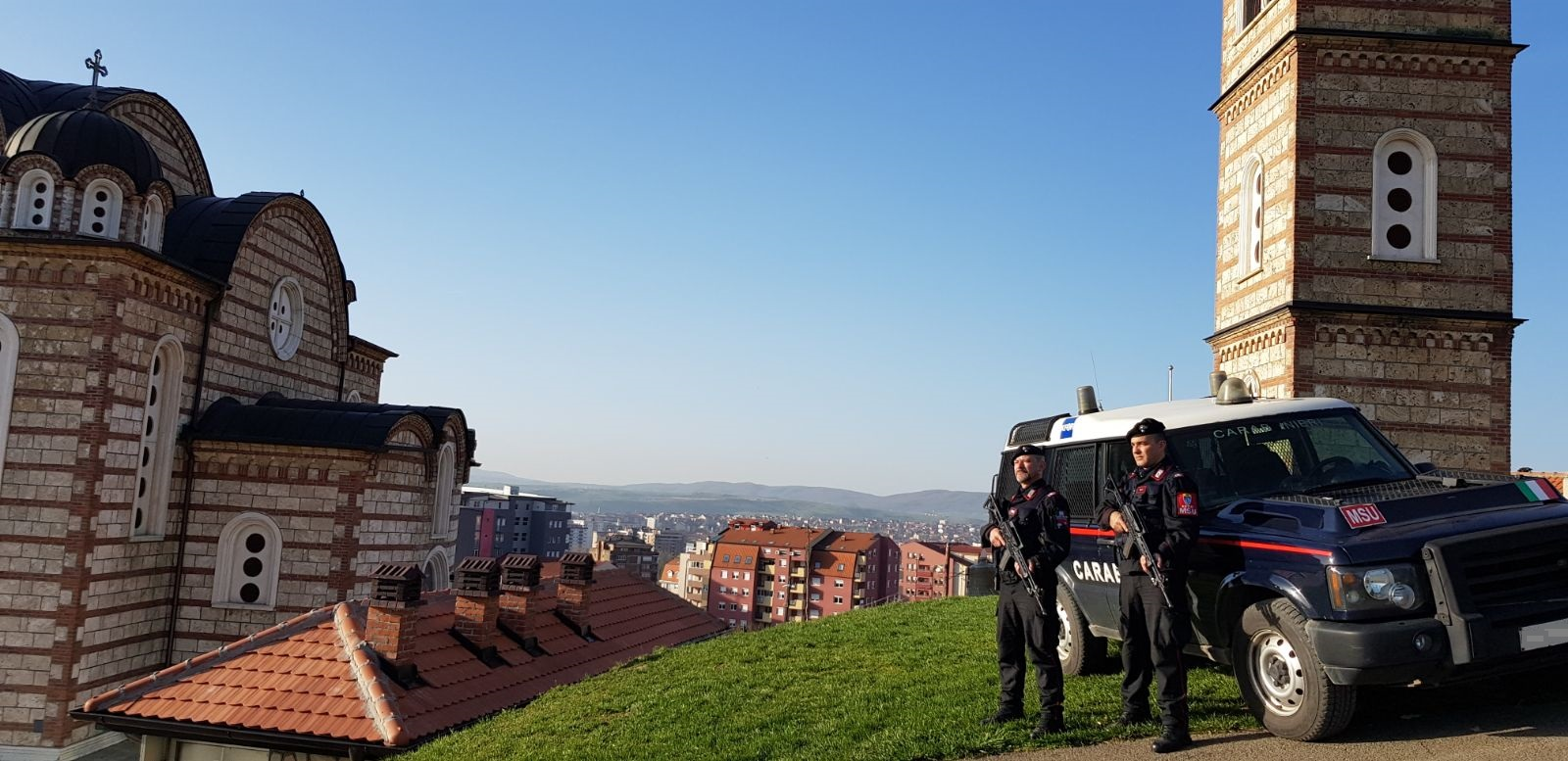
KFOR-MSU Carabinieri patrol in Mitrovica near the St. Dimitri Orthodox Church (2017).

On 14 January 2017, the Belgrade-Kosovska Mitrovica train incident happened when rhetoric was exchanged between Kosovo and Serbian Officials after Serbia announced restarting train service between Kosovo and Serbia and Kosovo responded stating that the train would be stopped at the border. The initial train was painted in the colors of the Serbian flag with the words “Kosovo is Serbia” printed down the side which was considered provocative by Kosovo Officials and Kosovo Officials stated that Police would stop it at the border. The train traveled from Belgrade to the border town of Raska and returned never crossing into Kosovo. Train service between Kosovo and Serbia remains non-existent.

On 21 March 2018, Kosovo's Assembly ratified the border agreement with Montenegro. The European Union set ratification as a condition before it would grant Kosovo nationals visa-free access to the pass-port free Schengen area. 8 September, Serbia's president visited North Kosovo's Gazivode Lake, an important source of Kosovo's water. The following day, his planned visit to the majority-Serb village Banje was cancelled by the Kosovo government after Kosovo Albanian protestors put up barricades at the village's entrance. 29 Sept, Kosovo's president visited Gazivode Lake. Serbia accused Kosovo police of seizing control of the lake and briefly detaining workers and Kosovo said police were there to provide security for the visit and nobody was detained. A Kosovo Serbian representative said Serbia was putting its military as well as police under high alert as a result. 20 November The international police agency (INTERPOL), rejected Kosovo's membership. On 21 November, Kosovo imposed an import tax on Serbian and Bosnia Herzegovina goods. Kosovo said the tariff would be lifted when Serbia recognizes its sovereignty and stops blocking it from joining international organizations and Serbia said it will not participate in further dialogue until the measure is lifted.

On 1 July 2021, NATO Secretary-General Jens Stoltenberg confirmed that the KFOR mission would continue.

On 29 May 2023, more than 30 NATO peacekeeping soldiers defending three town halls in northern Kosovo were injured in clashes with Serb protesters, while Serbia's president put the army on the highest level of combat alert. The tense situation developed after ethnic Albanian mayors took office in northern Kosovo's Serb-majority area after elections that the Serbs boycotted.

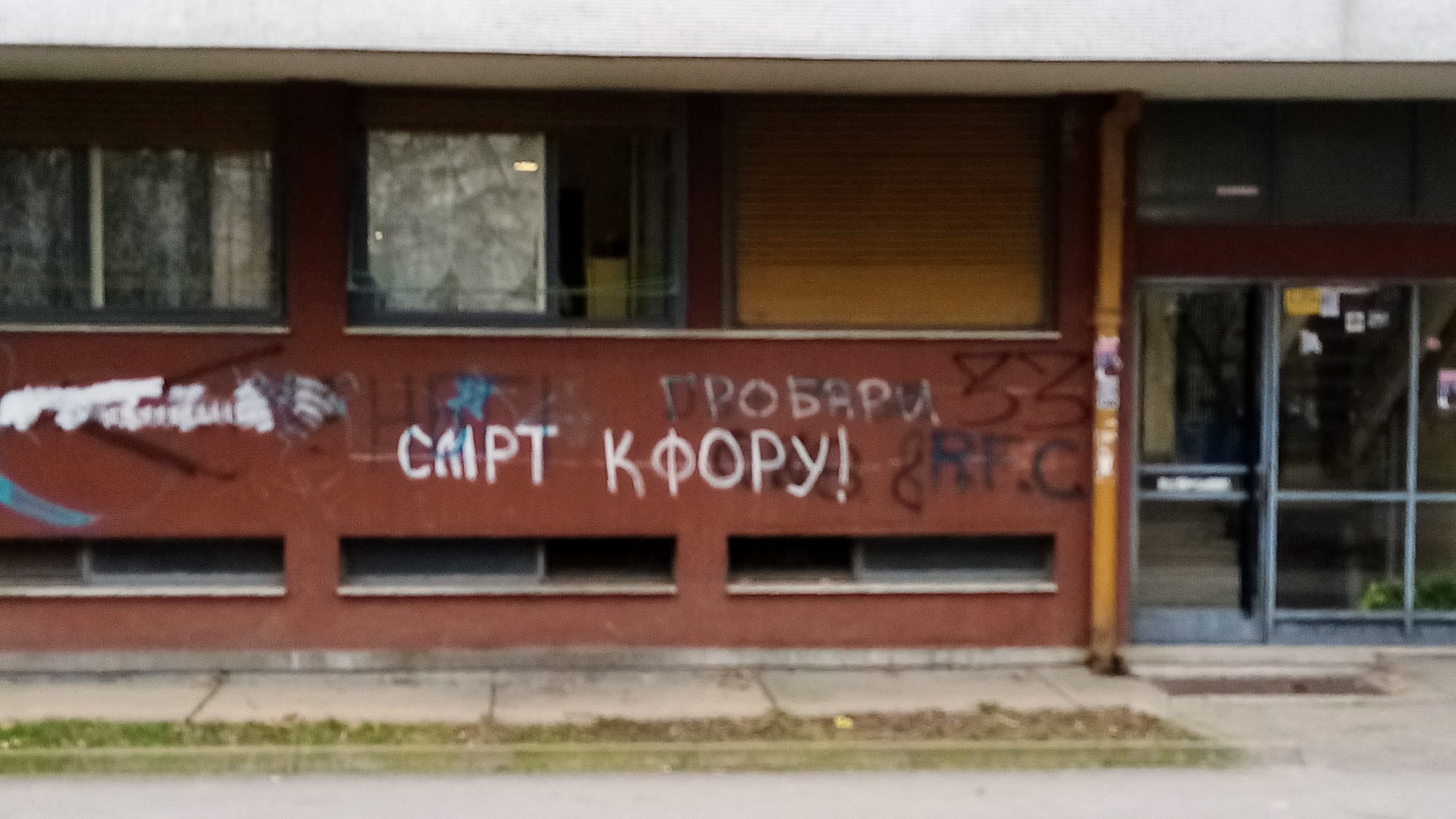
Graffiti against KFOR in Fontana, Belgrade; "Death to KFOR".

On 29 September 2023, the NATO Secretary-General announced the authorisation of additional forces to address the build up of Serbian troops on the border of Kosovo and Serbia in order to keep peace within the region.

=== KFOR fatalities ===
The largest fatal event is that of the 42 Slovak soldiers dead in a 2006 military plane crash in Hungary. In 20 years, more than 200 NATO soldiers have died as part of KFOR.
