= Kosovar civil society =

Kosovar civil society has had many incarnations since the early 1990s. It is a product of the occupation of the Kosovo province by the Socialist Federal Republic of Yugoslavia through 1999, then expanded when the Republic of Kosovo was under UNMIK and KFOR control, and now how it has evolved since the unilateral declaration of independence on February 17, 2008. It consists of the former civil society organizations from before the 1999 conflict, the local NGOs that came about post conflict, and the international NGOs that have either dispersed money or opened local branches within Kosovo.

It has a majority ethnic Albanian population, while having a minority Serbian, Roma, Ashkali, Egyptian, Macedonian, Montenegrin, and Croatian population. Prior to 2008, the government functions were administered by UNMIK and it was protected by KFOR. UNMIK and KFOR started their missions in 1999 after the NATO-led bombing of Yugoslavia and Serbian positions.

== History of Modern Kosovo ==
=== Kosovo under Yugoslavia ===
The province of Kosovo was a part of Yugoslavia since its creation in 1943. After the 1974 Yugoslavian constitution, it was made an autonomous province that had status similar to the other Yugoslavian republics without giving it full rights. This lasted until Slobodan Milošević came into power in 1988, when he changed the legal status of the province and started a campaign to purge Albanians from the government and education system. The response was the creation of parallel societies in Kosovo, one controlled from Belgrade and one created by the local Albanian population. A few of these organizations still exist, but all were focused on providing basic services, such as education and healthcare.

=== Directly before the war ===
This period of time is characterized by a legal environment that severely restricted the amount of NGOs and their effectiveness. In addition to the legal constrictions, there were also security concerns that limited the number of NGOs.

The Mother Teresa Society was one such organization that provided health care services; The Council for the Defense of Human Rights and Freedoms collected and recorded information about human rights violations. These NGOs lasted through the war and are still active in the community to date.

=== Directly after the war ===
This period is characterized by the increased effectiveness of NGOs due to changes in the legal and security situation in Kosovo. The focus of the NGOs was on reconstruction, of infrastructure and residences, and humanitarian aid.

Directly after the war, there was a large surge in international NGOs and money donated into the post-conflict area. After the NATO-led intervention and the signing of Regulation 1999/22 on May 9, 2000, the legal and security situation surrounding NGOs vastly improved. This allowed the international NGOs that had rushed into the country to operate with local counterparts; it also permitted the establishment and regulation of Kosovo-based NGOs.

=== Since 2008 ===
With the 5th anniversary of Kosovo, the focus of the civil society in Kosovo has shifted from reconstruction to governance and nation building. There has also been a shift in focus towards the protection of minority rights, specifically women, Roma, and Serbs.

As Kosovo has moved past the initial reconstruction phase, there has also been a decrease in the amount of available funds and number of donors. It is estimated that there are only approximately 500 "active" NGOs, from the 4882 registered; the others have been deemed either dormant or do not have the capacity to have any sort of meaningful effect on the country.

== In Kosovo ==
=== Who ===
The civil society of Kosovo is generally made up of ethnic Albanians. After the NATO-led intervention, the influx of international NGOs changed the demographics of the civil society. There were a large amount of internationals from NATO member countries especially, that were based in Kosovo. Since the declaration of independence, there has been a shift to include the minorities into the process of building a democratic society.

Due to the Republic of Kosovo's young population and high unemployment rates, there have been few instances of a shortage in engaging with the local population. However, NGOs cannot sustain large numbers of employees, most have between three and five employees and very few have more than 10, so while there are plenty, they are unable to provide employment for large portions of the population.

=== What ===
The civil society in the 1990s was focused on education, health care, women's rights, and the recording of human rights violations. Post-conflict Kosovo civil society was again focused on health care, women's rights, community development, and human rights; there were additional focuses on reconstruction of infrastructure and residences and humanitarian aid. Since the declaration of independence, the focus has been on the legal system, especially the judiciary and rule of law, community development, and good governance. Majority of the NGOs are focused on transparency in both the legal system and governance.

=== Types ===
Kosovo recognizes two types of domestic organization, associations and foundations. Both organizations can apply for Public Beneficiary Status, though both types are still responsible for VAT, with minor exceptions.

==== Associations ====
An association is a membership organization established by at least three domestic or foreign legal or natural persons. At least one member must reside in the Republic of Kosovo.

==== Foundations ====
A foundation is an organization without members, whose main function is to manage property or assets. It would be created by at least one legal or natural, foreign or domestic person. It can be created by a will. There has to be at least one agent who has residence in Kosovo.

=== Impact on development ===
The NGOs have been the major agents of change throughout Kosovo since before the war. They were able to provide basic services during the 1990s and help UNMIK rebuild the country after the 1999 conflict. According to UNDP's Human Development Report in 2008, every fourth Kosovar family has had their life impacted by a civil society activity and that there are more people benefiting from the system than those who are participating in the system. This latter aspect is seen more with other minorities and seen least among Kosovar-Serbs, the report states; however it does mention that Kosovar Serbs answered "don't know" when surveyed, so there could be confusion about the benefits and if they are receiving more than they know.

The report also states that assistance with housing is the most common form of benefit, followed by infrastructure, education, and health care respectively.

The structure of the civil society has affected the impact tremendously. There are, generally, strong organizational features of the civil society of Kosovo. However, there are areas of improvement, especially in the implementation aspect. It also states that while democratization and transparency are emphasized in internal documents and memorandums, it does not consistently translate into practice.

=== Funding ===
The NGO sector in Kosovo exists in a donor-funded environment. Of the organizations that reported revenues, a majority of them receive most of their financial support from a single donor and receive small amounts from few others. Foreign donors continue to be the main source of funding for CSOs in Kosovo, though with a noticeable decline compared to data from 2015. There has been little movement towards fundraising from local businesses. In Kosovo, there are several types of tax benefits available for donors. Despite their existence, however, there is limited interest in using them.

Tax deductible donations can be received by any CSO, as long as it is duly registered in accordance with the NGO Law and has received and maintained public benefit status. Other CSOs such as organizations to protect the environment and institutions, including medical and educational institutions, religious institutions and orphanages are also eligible recipients of tax-deductible donations. The tax exemption provided cannot be used if the donation directly, or indirectly, benefits the donor or related persons of the donor.

== Relationship with the government of Kosovo ==
Since 1999, NGOs have had to deal with a two-tiered system of government. They were regulated by the PISG and UNMIK. This has created problems, as UNMIK has been unresponsive to local level civil society activities compounded by the seeming distrust between civil society and PISG.

Since 2002, the international community has been reducing the amount of money flowing into Kosovo to ensure that the PISG and NGOs would be forced to work together. However, this has not happened to a large extent. Only with international pressure does the PISG really consult with NGOs on the formation of new laws and regulations, with the notable exception of the National Action Plan for Gender Equality between politicians and women's civil society organizations. This happened over 10 weeks in 2003.

Normal interactions between the government and NGOs are done through personal contacts. There are no institutional mechanisms in place to facilitate or require cooperation between the two entities.

It has been speculated that the PISG still has views of the civil society as a supportive role from the pre-war era, while also viewing NGOs as competitors for the ever-shrinking international monetary fund. The reverse is the traditional Kosovar suspicion of government authorities. This cycle has impaired the process of state building, reconstruction, and development.

== Coordination in Kosovo ==
Majority of the funding for NGOs is project-based and generally has individual donating bodies. There is still a good amount of money that comes from UNDP, EULEX, and OSCE. UNDP focuses on projects and proposals that will affect the development of Kosovo, from infrastructure to education. EULEX focuses on projects and proposals that will increase the effectiveness of rule of law in Kosovo. OSCE works with elections and ethnic relations. They try and increase government accountability, transparency, and good governance.

== Organizations ==
Think Tanks or Research Institutes:

1. INDEP (Institute for Development Policy)
  1. Established in 2011 as an association of policy analysts and long-term civil society activists, INDEP provides research-based policy solutions in areas of democratisation, sustainable economic development and regional co-operation. INDEP's mission is to strengthen and guide sustainable socio-political and economic development based on the principles of democracy and democratic values. Within a short period of time, the think tank became very influential in Kosovo but also internationally, having scrutinised projects and policies of the World Bank
2. D4D (Democracy for Development)
  1. A recent addition to the think tank ranks, D4D is focused mainly on election fairness and ethnic relations. Their mission is to research and showcase the link between effective democracy as a foundation pillar for development as a nation. Their goals include: The development of independent public policy research in the field of socio-economic development, governance, the development of political parties, and the development of inter-ethnic, regional and international relations.
3. KIPRED (Kosovar Institute for Policy Research and Development):
  1. Found in 2002, this impartial, non-profit NGO's mission is the promotion and consolidation of democracy and democratic values in Kosovo. They are an independent research driven organization.
4. IKS (Kosovar Stability Institute)
  1. IKS was founded in 2004 and is primarily focused on empirical research and analysis on socio-economic development in Kosovo. Since its founding IKS's work has been focused on issues of governance, economic development, urban planning, corruption in post-war reconstruction, education, Kosovo’s image problem, and environmental issues.
5. GLPS (Group for Legal and Political Studies)
  1. The Group is a non-profit think tank that focused on credible policy research, focusing on law, economics, and politics.
6. RIINVEST (The Institute for Development Research)
  1. Founded in 1995, RIINVEST is a non-profit research organization that focuses on economic development in Kosovo, specifically entrepreneurship. After the conflict, they worked with differing levels of business (SMEs, family business, etc.) to ensure a successful reconstruction. Now they look at policy and policy advocacy on expansion of the business environment and construction of conditions towards economic viability.
7. GAC (Green Art Center - Prishtina)
  1. Established in 2013 as a non governmental organisation focused on Environmental Issues, GAC intends to raise the awareness of citizens for the needs of the surrounding society, to improve our community living standard, to improve the environment where we act and live through artistic creativity and professional work always using ecological experience. To achieve their goals, GAC focuses on Capacity building; Education for Art, Design and Ecological initiatives; Environmental Education; Trainings on creating ecological designs; Information and Public Participation. GAC is also the establisher of EcoFriend in Kosovo. Together with the support of GIZ, FLC and other donors, GAC is an active regulator in waste management sector in Kosova and Environmental Education.

Grass-root Organisations:

1. Forum for Civic Initiatives (FIQ-FCI)
  1. Founded in 2000, FIQ is involved with increasing philanthropy, citizen involvement, and protecting the environment. It does this mainly through its two programs, the Philanthropy Program and the Grants Program. At their annual event, they award the FIDES prize for philanthropy to a citizen of Kosovo. Their grant award mechanism is instilled into three areas: Eco, Active Citizen, and Unique Idea.

Activist Organisations:

1. Levizja FOL (The Speak Up! Movement)
  1. An NGO founded in 2008 that campaigns for active citizens with the hope that this will lead to a transparent and accountable government in Kosovo. They conduct research, raise awareness through campaigns, and network to reach their goal. They work to achieve this through three programs: The Debate Program, the Good Governance Program, and the Public Engagement Program.
2. Cohu (Mission ÇOHU!)
  1. This organization is dedicated to fighting organized crime and corruption within the government. Founded in 2005, they have been working to energize the public to make demands to stop corruption, political abuses of power, and public waste. They work through four programs: 1)Democratization and Public Integrity Office 2)Office of Legal Counsel and Infrastructure Anti-corruption 3) Bureau for Public Companies and Privatization 4) Kosovar Center for Investigative Journalism
3. KOSID (Kosovo Civil Society's Consortium for Sustainable Development)
  1. This is a consortium of the leading CSOs that are focused on creating sustainable development in the Republic of Kosovo. The idea is to combine ideas and efforts to help drive towards that common goal of developing in a sustainable manner. The consortium includes anyone from media organizations to think tanks.
4. KW4W (Kosovo Women for Women)
  1. This is a subsidiary of the Women for Women International organization, whose mission it is to "support the most marginalized women in Kosovo to earn and save money, improve health and well-being, influence decisions within the family and community, and connect to networks for support. By utilizing skills, knowledge, and resources, women will be able to create sustainable change for, themselves, their families, and community." They have been an established part of Kosovar civil society for 16 years. During those years they have educated 30 000+ women, and they have facilitated hundreds of jobs for women in Kosovo. They are currently running several projects with international backing, including; fostering self-reliance among minority-group women, advancing women's cooperatives and educating marginalized women. It is one of the most experienced organizations in Kosovo.

Regional:

1. Youth Initiative for Human Rights,
  1. This is a regional networks of NGOs in the Balkans region that are dedicated to rule of law empowerment and democratization. This is a network founded by young people to help increase the youth involvement in the aforementioned topics.
2. Humanitarian Law Center
  1. Established in 1997, this branch of the HLC was focused, up until the outbreak of the conflict between the Serbian forces and the KLA, on documenting police repression of Albanians, investigating cases of torture, illegal detentions, and political trials. After 1998, they focused on the killing and disappearance of Albanians until the NATO-intervention. After the end of the hostilities, they focused on reporting on war crimes, human rights violations, minority rights, victims, and the killings and disappearances of Albanians, Roma, Serbs, Bosnians, and other minorities throughout the conflict period and beyond. They have started to implement a program for educating the youth about the past.

Specific Funding Sources:

1. Soros Foundation
2. Rockefeller Brothers Fund
3. German Marshall Fund
4. Bertelsmann Foundation

== Applicable Laws ==
- Constitution of the Republic of Kosovo
- Law No. 04/ L-057 on Freedom of Association in Non-Governmental Organizations; entered into force in October 2011 (Law on Freedom of Association)
- Law No. 04/L-103, on amending and supplementing the Law No. 03/L-162 on Corporate Income Tax; promulgated by Decree No. DL-019-2012 of May 17, 2012
- Law No. 03/L-146 on Value Added Tax; in effect since January 1, 2010
- Law No. 04/L-104 on amending and supplementing the Law No. 03/L-161 on Personal Income Tax; promulgated by Decree No. DL-020-2012 of May 17, 2012
- Law No. 2004/3 The Anti-Discrimination Law
- Law No. 03/L-040 on Local Self Government
- Law No. 03/L-047 on the Protection and Promotion of the Rights of Communities and Their Members in Kosovo
- Law No. 03/L-034 on Citizenship of Kosovo
- Law No. 03/L –215 on Access to Public Documents; in effect since October 2010
- Law No. 04/L-093 on Banks, Microfinance Institutions and Non Bank Financial Institutions
- Regulation 2004/2 on the Deterrence of Money Laundering and Related Criminal Offences
