= 10 February 2007 protest in Kosovo =

Protest against the Ahtisaari Plan

- 10 February riots
- Date: 10 February 2007
- Location: Pristina, Kosovo
- Goals: Anti-Ahtisaari Plan; Against Kosovo-Serbia negotiations
- Methods: Demonstrations
- Result: Correction of the Ahtisaari Plan

Parties
| Vetëvendosje; Kosovar civil society | UNMIK: UNMIK Police; Romanian Police; French Police; Government of Kosovo ^{until the escalation of the situation}: Kosovo Police |

Lead figures
| Albin Kurti; Adem Demaçi; Nesrete Kumanova | UNMIK |

Number
| 10,000 | 5,000 |

Casualties and losses
| 2 killed; 1000 injured; +1000 arrested | unknown |

On 10 February 2007, Kosovo Albanians protested against the Ahtisaari Plan. The crowd in Pristina protested against a UN plan on the future status of Kosovo. Many ethnic Albanians were unhappy that the plan fell short of granting full independence for Kosovo. The proposals, unveiled on February 2 by chief UN envoy Martti Ahtisaari, recommended a form of self-rule - which in itself was strongly opposed by Serbia.

Arben Xheladini and Mon Balaj were killed on 10 February 2007, during a demonstration after the Romanian Police serving in the UN Interim Administration Mission in Kosovo, UNMIK, fired rubber bullets. Others were seriously injured. The international rights watchdog Amnesty International urged the UN Special Representative in Kosovo to persuade the UN mission in Kosovo, UNMIK, to apologize for the "failure to protect the lives of Mon Balaj and Arben Xheladini ... and provide the complainants with full reparation for the damage suffered".
