= Krymnash =

Russian neologism and meme

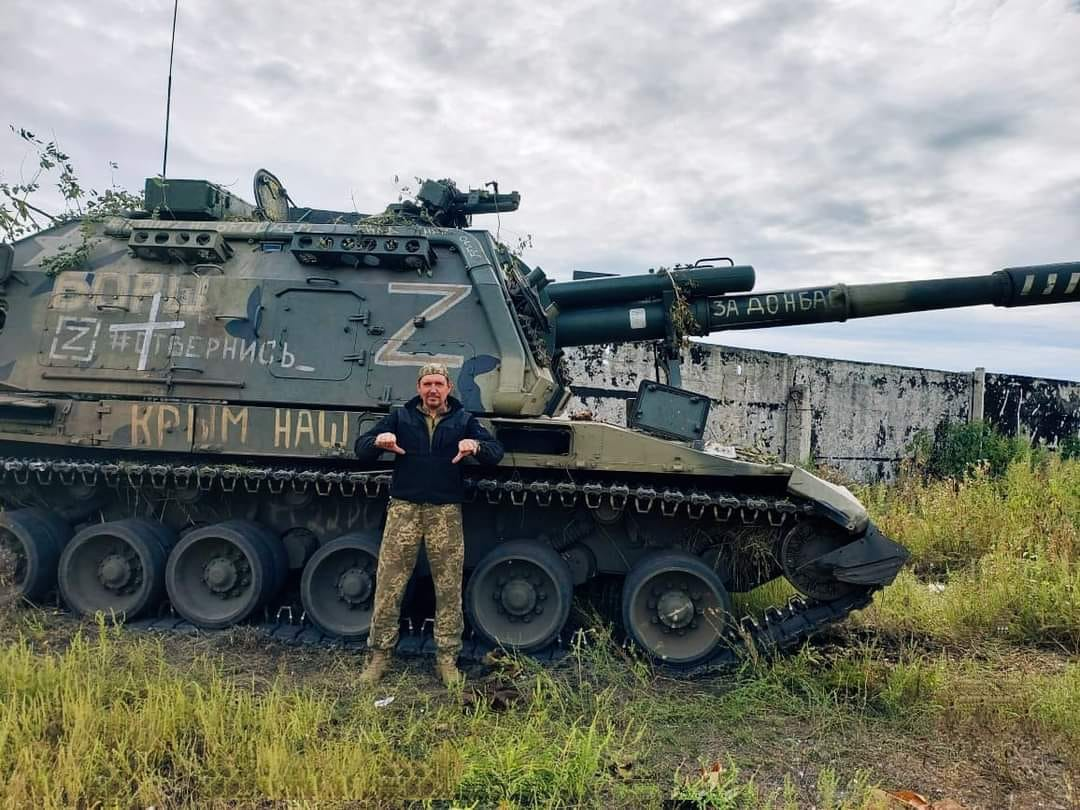
A Russian self-propelled gun captured during the Russo-Ukrainian war with "Krym Nash" written on the side.

"Krymnash" (Russian: Крымнаш, lit. 'Crimea [is] ours') is a Russian-language neologism and Internet meme that arose in popularity in Russia at the beginning of the Russo-Ukrainian war to celebrate the Russian annexation of Crimea.

Originally used as a patriotic slogan by nationalist Russians in the form "Крым наш!", it subsequently spread in Ukraine as a mocking Internet meme.

== Original form of the meme ==
According to scholar Mikhail Suslov, "'Krymnash' arose as a serious meme as an attempt at describing reality" in 2014 to promote the idea that Crimea must become part of Russia. In November 2015, a survey said that 52% of Russians believed "Krymnash" was a symbol of their country's "pride and revival".

In March 2016, there was an attempt to hold a rally to celebrate the anniversary of "Krymnash" in Moscow, but it did not occur.

== Satirical meme ==
According to Suslov, "literally a day after the referendum, the meme was redefined in an ironic way." The new satirical form of "Krymnash" began to be used in a satirical context to mock Russia's domestic failures in spite of the annexation. In formal writing, the phrase would be written as two words, like "Krym nash", but was written without spaces as "Krymnash" in its slogan form on the Internet. Galina Sklyarevskaya, the head of a computer lexicography department at St. Petersburg University, says that this kind of hashtag-like spelling of slogans is influenced by Twitter. In the satirical incarnation of the phrase, the two words are always combined. In this ironic context, it is used as "almost a throw-away line – "our toilets don't work but at least Krymnash!""

When the phrase is still used sincerely by supporters of the annexation, it is almost always spelled out in two words with both capitalized, as "Krym Nash".

An ironical anagram "Krymnash" -> "Namkrysh" («Крым наш» -> «Нам крыш») was variously used by Russian dissidents. «Нам крыш» is a hint to the expression of panic «Нам крышка» ("We are doomed").

The slogan was also proposed as a gender neutral name, though its unknown if it was used to name a child or not.

== See also ==
- Putin khuylo!
- Z (military symbol)
- Vatnik
- "Bessarabia, Romanian land"
- "Kosovo is Serbia"
