= Bessarabia, Romanian land =

Romanian nationalist and irredentist slogan

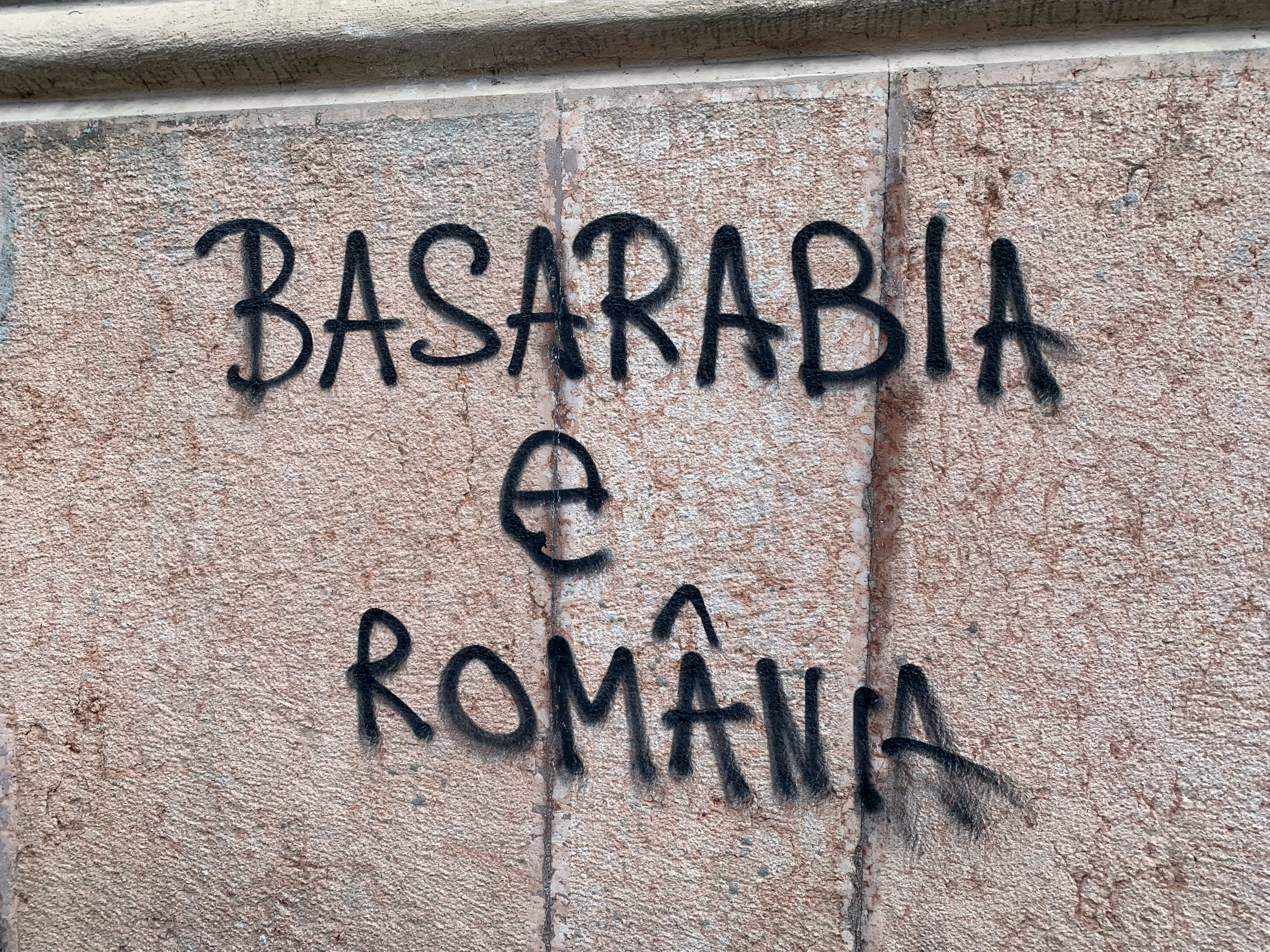
Graffiti writing Basarabia e România ("Bessarabia is Romania") near the Ion I. C. Brătianu Square in Timișoara, Romania

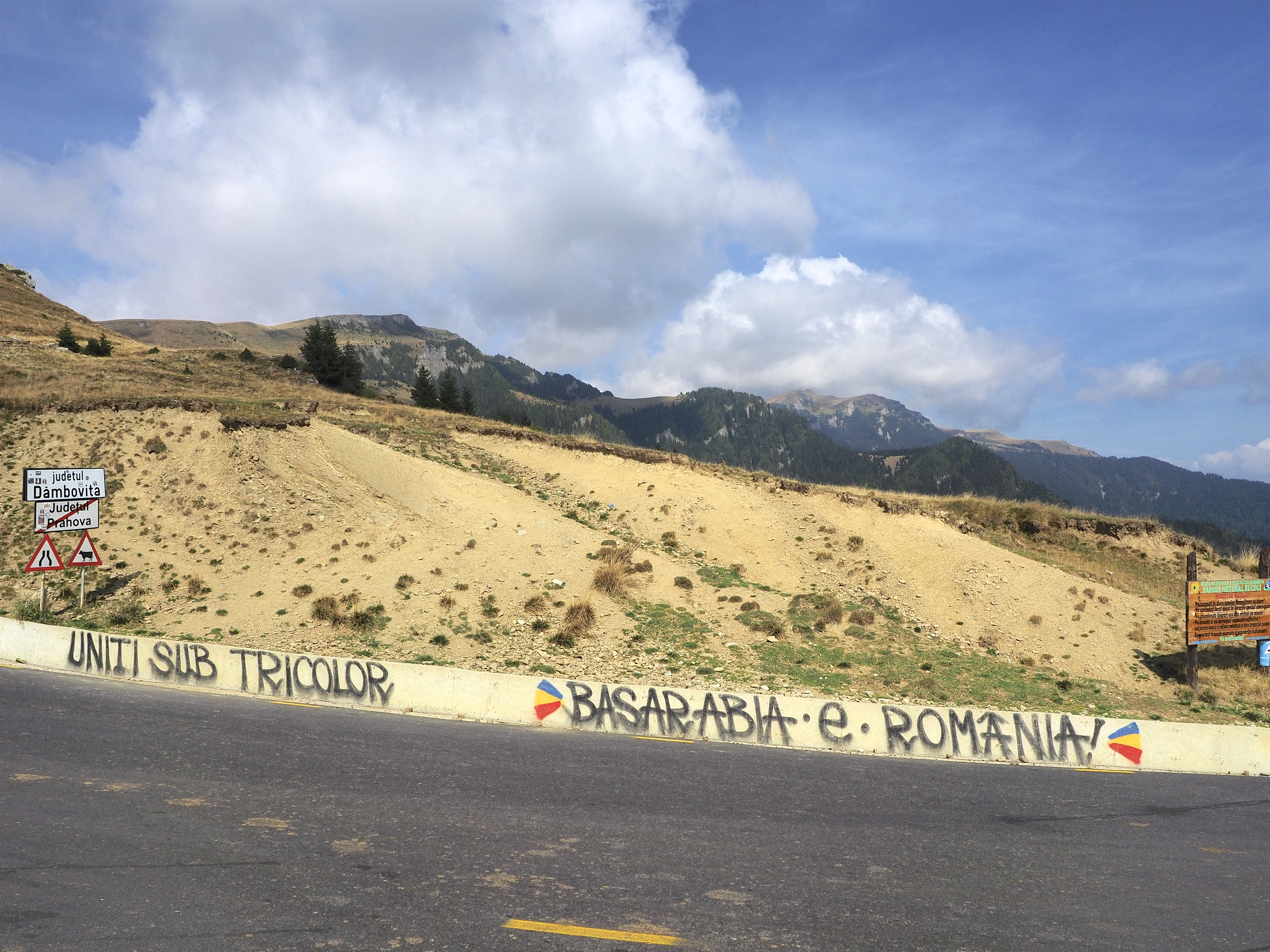
Graffiti on a road on the border between Dâmbovița County and Prahova County, in Romania, saying Uniți sub tricolor – Basarabia e România! ("United under the tricolor – Bessarabia is Romania!").

"Bessarabia, Romanian land" (Romanian: Basarabia, pământ românesc), "Bessarabia is Romanian land" (Basarabia e pământ românesc) or "Bessarabia is Romania" (Basarabia e România, also Basarabia este România) is a popular and commonly used Romanian nationalist and irredentist slogan posing claims over the geographical region of Bessarabia, today divided between the Republic of Moldova and parts of Ukraine. According to the Romanian newspaper Adevărul, the use of this slogan as a patriotic catchphrase started in 2006 from a group of anonymous young Romanians from Bucharest.

The slogan has been often used in demonstrations and events supporting the unification of Moldova and Romania. It is also seen with frequency in graffiti and stickers on walls and other places throughout Romania, although it is also used in Moldova. The phrase has had several notable uses at various times, such as at a protest organized by the Romanian political party Noua Dreaptă ("New Right") against the Bucharest Pride edition of May 2010, in a huge banner during a football match between France and Romania on 5 September 2010 in the Stade de France and for vandalizing a synagogue in Chișinău, the capital of Moldova, along antisemitic and Nazi symbolry. Furthermore, it was used during the Centenary March of 2018.

Notable individuals and entities that have used this slogan include the Romanian activist and politician George Simion and the Romanian politician Rareș Bogdan but also the Romanian party Alliance for the Union of Romanians (AUR), of which Simion is the president. Romanian historian Lucian Boia has shown himself against the use of the phrase, saying that, in his opinion, it is not appropriate to say that "Bessarabia is Romania" because Moldova "has its own history and its own challenges" and because, at the time of his declarations, most Moldovans preferred to remain independent rather than uniting with Romania as indicated by certain polls, although he admitted the similarities between the two countries.

The slogan has also been applied to other former regions of Romania, such as Bukovina by the Romanian historian Georgeta Filitti in an article for the Romanian radio station Radio România Cultural and Transnistria by the Romanian politician Bogdan Diaconu in a newspaper article for Adevărul. It has also been used for regions already part of Romania, such as Transylvania by the former Social Democratic Party (PSD) president Victor Ponta and Dobruja for a contest organized for students by the County Council of Tulcea.

== See also ==
- "Kosovo is Serbia"
- "Krymnash"
- Day of the Union of Bessarabia with Romania
- Unification of Moldova and Romania
- Bessarabian question
