= Salvatore Cuoci =

- Born: Salvatore Cuoci; January 26, 1965 (age 61); Aversa, Italy
- Military career
- Allegiance: Italy
- Branch: Army
- Rank: Major General
- Commands: Commander, Kosovo Force

Salvatore Cuoci (born January 26, 1965) is a member of the Italian Armed Forces, and the 22nd Commander of the Kosovo Force.

Cuoci has held several other commands within the Italian military, and other NATO led operations.

== Early life ==
Cuoci was born in Aversa on 26 January 1965. Before entering the military, he attended the Italian Military Academy in 1983.

== Military career ==
In 1987, after graduating from the military academy, he attended the Junior Army Officers School, located in Turin. Post-graduation Cuoci was appointed as Lieutenant of Armoured troops in September 1987.

He then served as a platoon commander for the 9th Armoured Battalion, "M.O. Butera" in L’Aquila, in the 6th Tank Battalion "M.O. Scapuzzi”. When in Civitavecchia he served as company commander, S2 and S3 Chief.

== Awards ==
Cuoci has received several awards from Italy, and other foreign nations.

- Order of Merit of the Italian Republic
- NATO Medal for Operation in former Yugoslavia
- French commemorative medal
- United Nations Medal for UNIFIL Peacekeeping Operation
