= Belgrade–Mitrovica train incident =

Train incident that occurred on 14 January 2017 on the Serbian-Kosovan border

Belgrade-Mitrovica Train Incident
- Part of Kosovo-Serbia relations
- Location: Raška, Serbia; 43°17′31″N 20°36′56″E
- Date: 14 January 2017
- Executed by: Serbian Railways
- Outcome: Train returns to Belgrade

The Belgrade–Mitrovica train incident happened on 14 January 2017, when a provocative Serbian train was prevented from entering Kosovo.

== Background ==
Several days before the incident, the Serbian media was reporting about a decorated ŽS 711 train. They claimed that it was supposed to re-establish the connection between Serbia and Kosovo, after almost two decades of inactivity. The train had a livery painted in the colours of the Serbian flag and the inscription "Kosovo is Serbia" written in 21 different languages, including Albanian. The train interior was decorated with frescoes from monasteries of the Serbian Orthodox Church, located in Kosovo. The author of the train livery, graphic designer Andrej Vasiljević, stated that by designing such a train, he wants to "show the world Serbian cultural heritage using artistic expression, and make clear to everyone to whom Kosovo belongs". He also said that his initiative was supported by the Serbian Government and Serbian national passenger railway company Srbija Voz.

On 14 January, Kosovo's president, Hashim Thaçi, published a Facebook post in which he stated that the aforementioned train had to be prevented from entering Kosovo, due to its "nationalist stickers", which are not in accordance with Kosovo's laws and constitution. Thaçi later ordered his Minister of Interior and Supreme Director of Police to prevent the train's arrival in Kosovo at all costs, after the Government of Kosovo consulted the European Union (EU) which responded that this "wasn't their concern".

== Incident and the immediate aftermath ==
The train departed from Belgrade at 4 am on 14 January 2017, and was supposed to reach Mitrovica, Kosovo, after more than 19 hours of travel. It was nevertheless stopped in Raška, the final railway station before crossing Kosovo's national borders, due to allegations that the railway tracks up ahead were mined. Afterwards, the train's passengers were switched to buses, which transported them all the way to Mitrovica, while the train returned to Belgrade the following day.

Serbian President Aleksandar Vučić then summoned a National Security Council Session, after which he accused Kosovo's police of mining the tracks and planning to arrest the train's engineer and all its passengers. He also said that it was his decision to stop the train in order to "prevent the wider conflict and show that we want peace". The Kosovan police later searched the tracks for explosives and found none.

== Reactions ==
Serbian Prime Minister Aleksandar Vučić stated that he will notify the United States, the European Union, and China of the fact that Kosovo "plays war games". He also said that it is his last appeal to Albanians in Kosovo not to attack Serbs, because Serbia will not allow these attacks.

Serbian President Tomislav Nikolić stated that he would send the Serbian Army to Kosovo if Serbs were killed. He also connected the incident with the then-leaving Barack Obama administration in the White House.

The Serbian Minister of Labour, Employment, Veteran, and Social Policy, Aleksandar Vulin, stated, "If it wasn't for the calm and very wise reaction of Aleksandar Vučić, we would have bloody fights on Northern Kosovo."

Kosovo's Prime Minister, Isa Mustafa, stated that "everything that happened" in regards to the arrival of the train from Belgrade to Mitrovica was an unnecessary situation caused by Serbia, and it is part of the "malicious intentions of Serbia to destabilize the situation in Kosovo".

The American ambassador to Kosovo, Greg Delawie, said that he is concerned about the train issue and "called for the restraint of all parties".
