= Kosovo is Serbia =

Serbian nationalist slogan

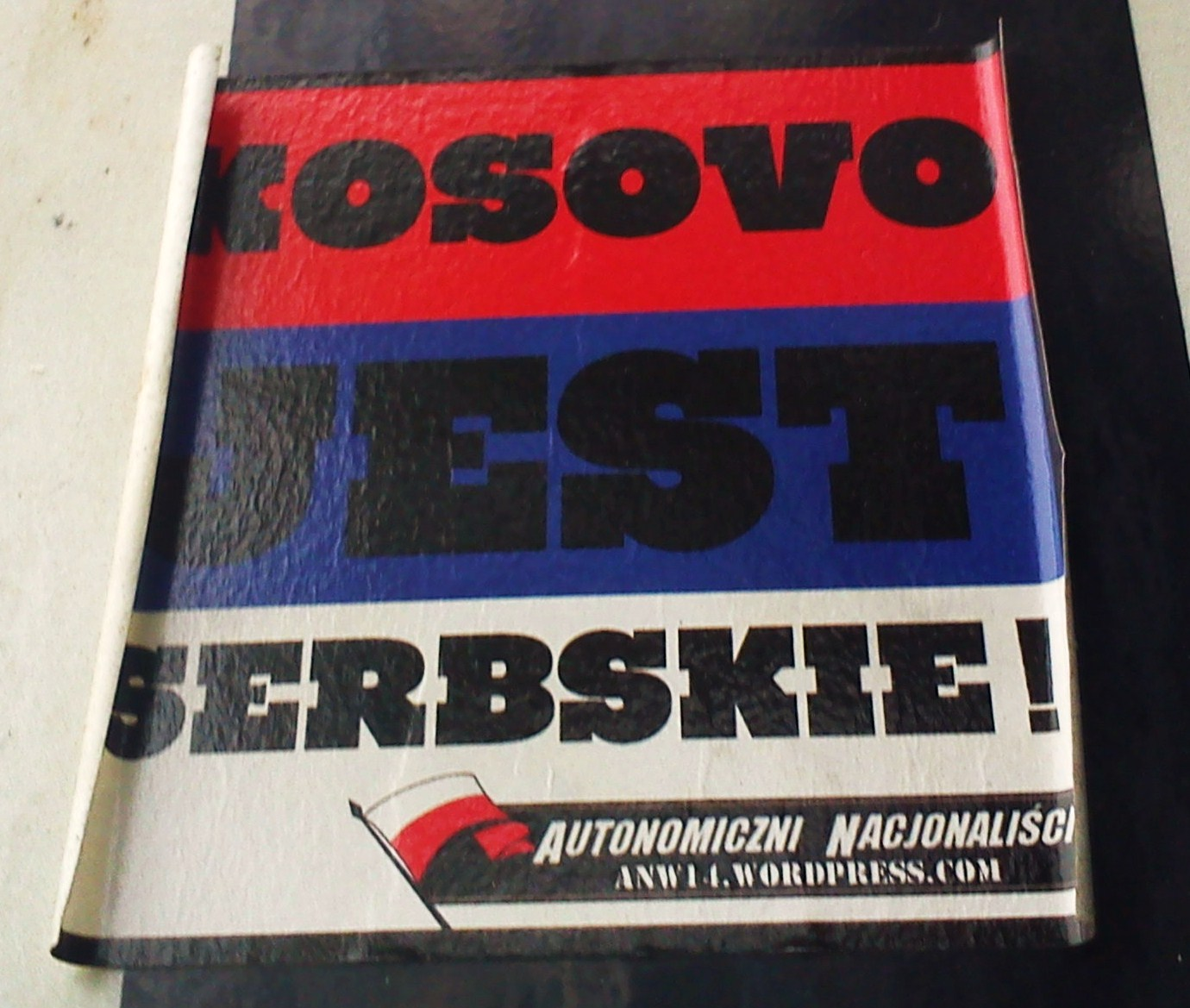
"Kosovo is Serbian" on the Autonomous Nationalists' sticker in the city center of Poznań, Poland

"Kosovo is Serbia" (Serbian: Косово је Србија, romanized: Kosovo je Srbija) is a slogan that has been used in Serbia since the 1980s, later popularized as a reaction to Kosovo's 2008 declaration of independence from Serbia.

== History ==
The slogan was used by a crowd in Serbia in a funeral following the 1987 Paraćin massacre.

Following Kosovo's declaration of independence on 17 February 2008 by Kosovar Albanian members of the Legislative Assembly, this was the marquee slogan used in the Belgrade demonstrations against it. The slogan has been used by a series of protests, and by the Serbian Government.

The slogan has appeared on T-shirts and in graffiti and was placed on the websites of Kosovar institutions by hackers in 2009. The slogan is used by Serbs across the world.

== Protests ==
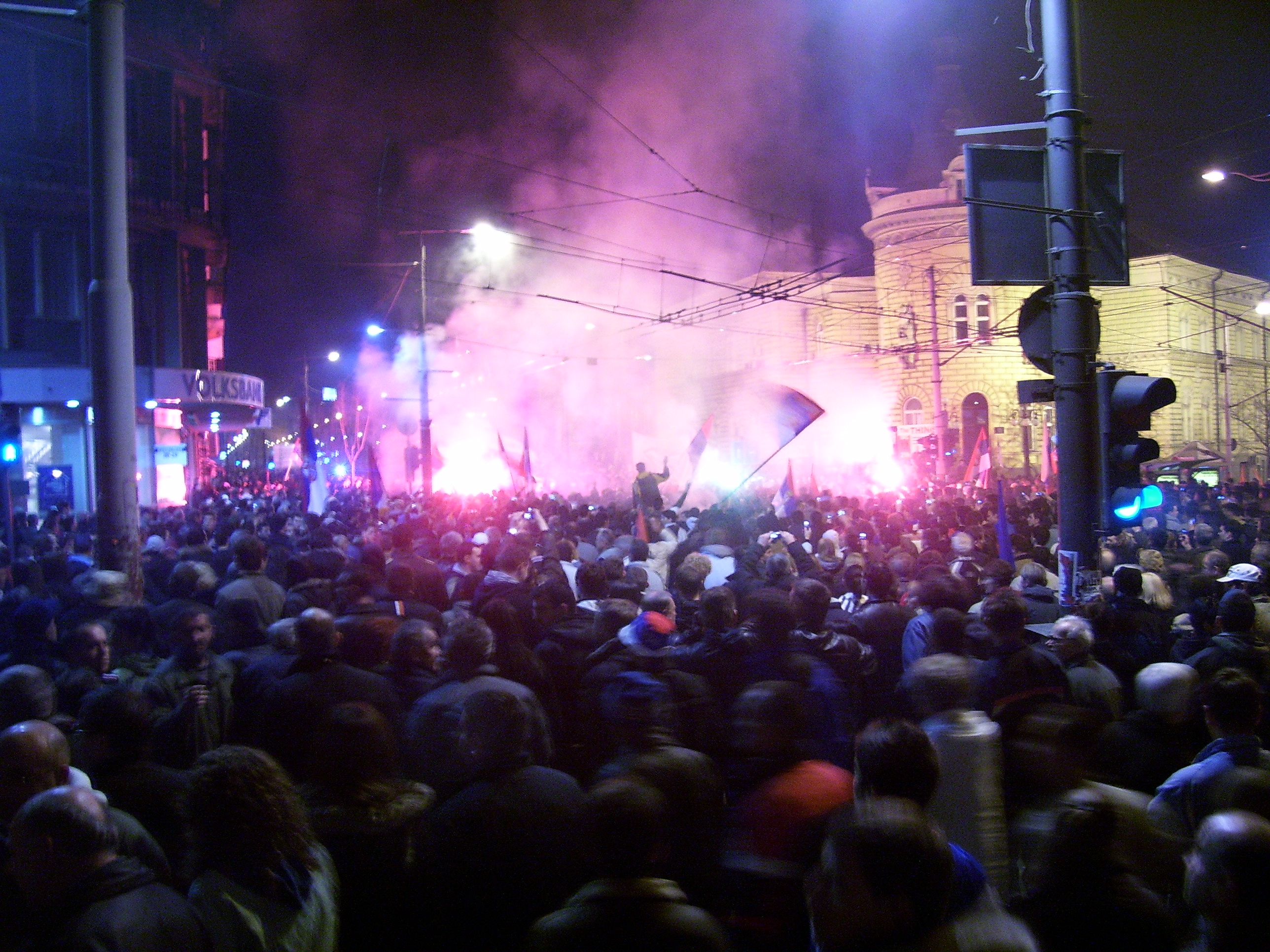
2008 Serbia protests, at the intersection on the way to the Cathedral of Saint Sava on February 21, 2008, in Belgrade

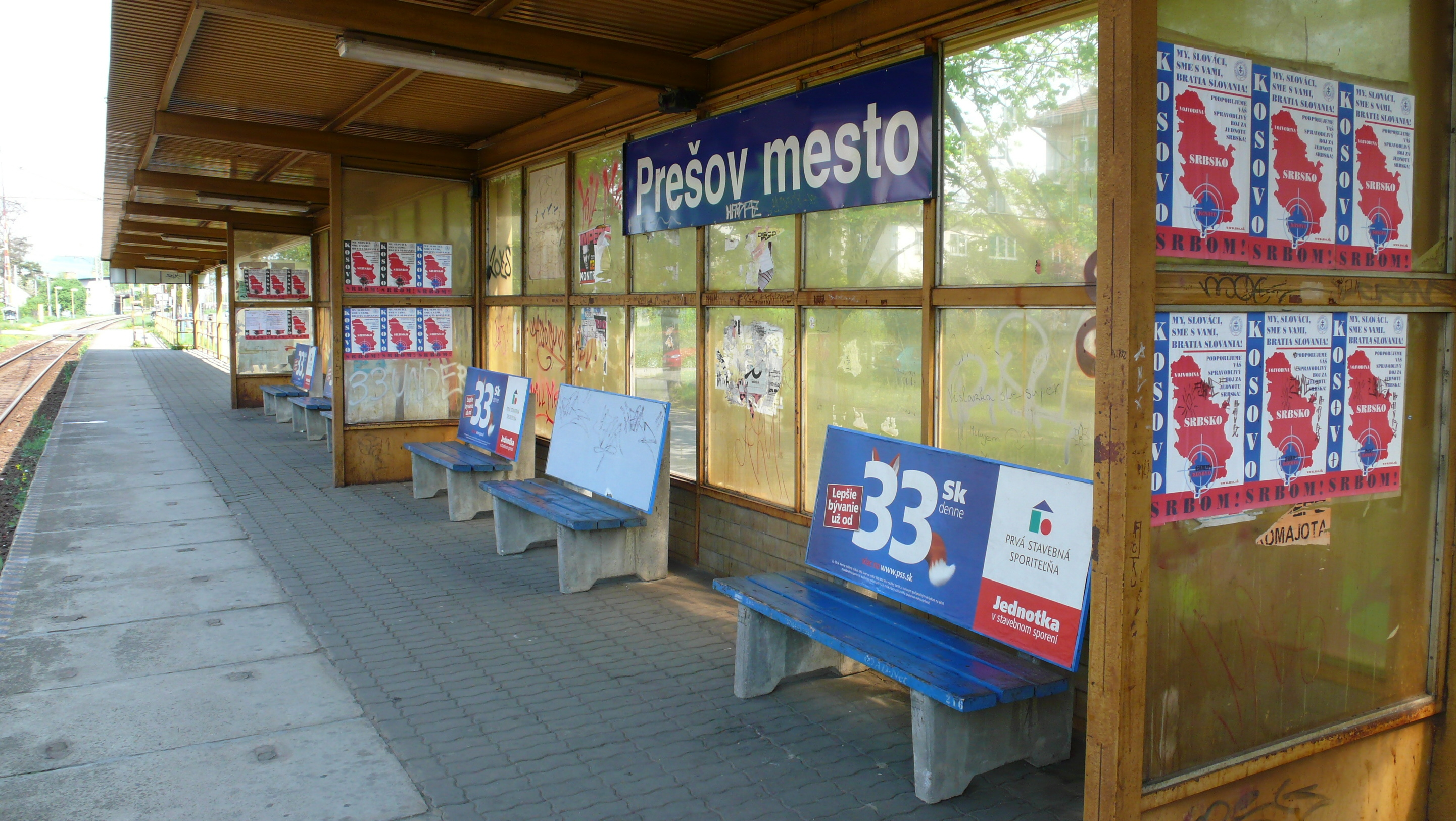
Posters supporting Kosovo as a part of Serbia at the Prešov Down-town Railway Stop in Slovakia

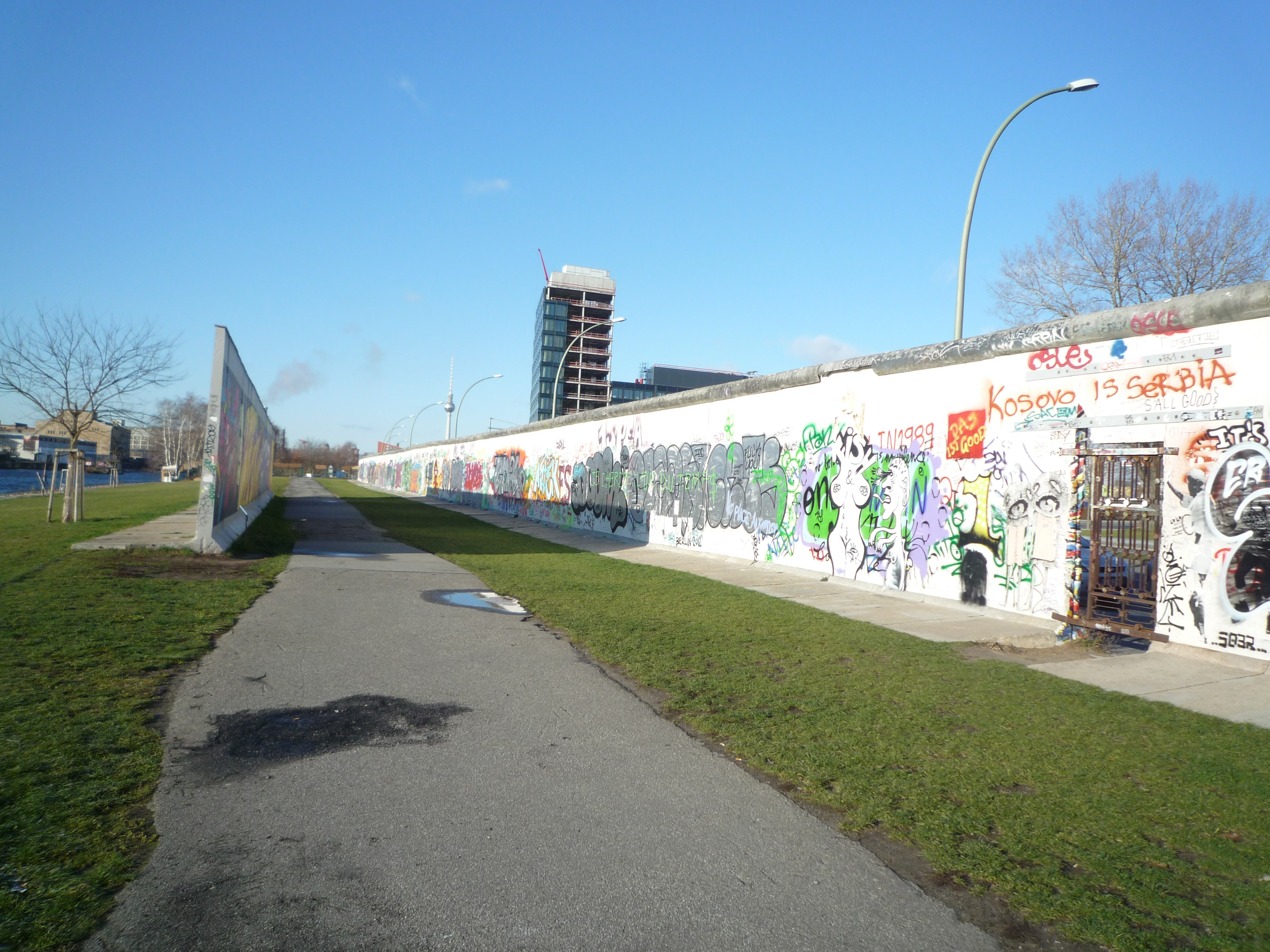
Kosovo is Serbia graffiti on the Berlin Wall

- A Kosovo je Srbija rally organised by the Serbian government was held on 21 February 2008 in Belgrade in front of the Parliament, with around 200,000–500,000 people attending. The US Embassy was set on fire by a small group of protesters. A small protest also occurred in London and 5,000 protesters demonstrated in Mitrovica the following day. Kosovo police were injured during a protest by 150 war veterans at a border crossing on 25 February.
- Violent protests using the slogan occurred in Montenegro after the government recognised the independence of Kosovo in October 2008.

== Notable uses ==
- In March 2008, American-born Serbian swimmer Milorad Čavić won the European championship in the 50 m butterfly, setting the new European record, a result briefly quashed when the European Swimming Federation (LEN) disqualified the swimmer for wearing a T-shirt at the medals ceremony that read “Kosovo is Serbia” in Serbian.
- On January 15, 2017, Serbian authorities sent a train from Belgrade destined for Kosovo, painted with the slogan and iconography inside, which was stopped at the border by Kosovar officials as it was considered to be provocative. Aleksandar Vučić ordered the train to be stopped at Raška as he believed the rail had been mined. The new train was intended for peace relations but was instead used by Tomislav Nikolić to the "brink of conflict", according to Kosovar officials.

== Serbian media campaign ==
Solidarity - Kosovo is Serbia (Serbian: Солидарност - Косово је Србија) is a media campaign in Serbia launched by Petar Petković in the final months of the negotiations over Kosovo and organised with the participation of 25 notable Serbian public figures, among them: Bata Živojinović, Svetlana Bojković, Dragan Bjelogrlić, Sergej Trifunović, Dragan Jovanović, Bora Đorđević, Đorđe David, Miki Jevremović, Slađana Milošević, Merima Njegomir and Emir Kusturica.

In 2000, more than 50 websites, including those of Adidas and Manchester United, were hacked with the message Kosovo je Srbija.

Additionally, the slogan has been used frequently across online spaces, becoming somewhat of an Internet meme satirizing hypernationalism.

== Reception ==
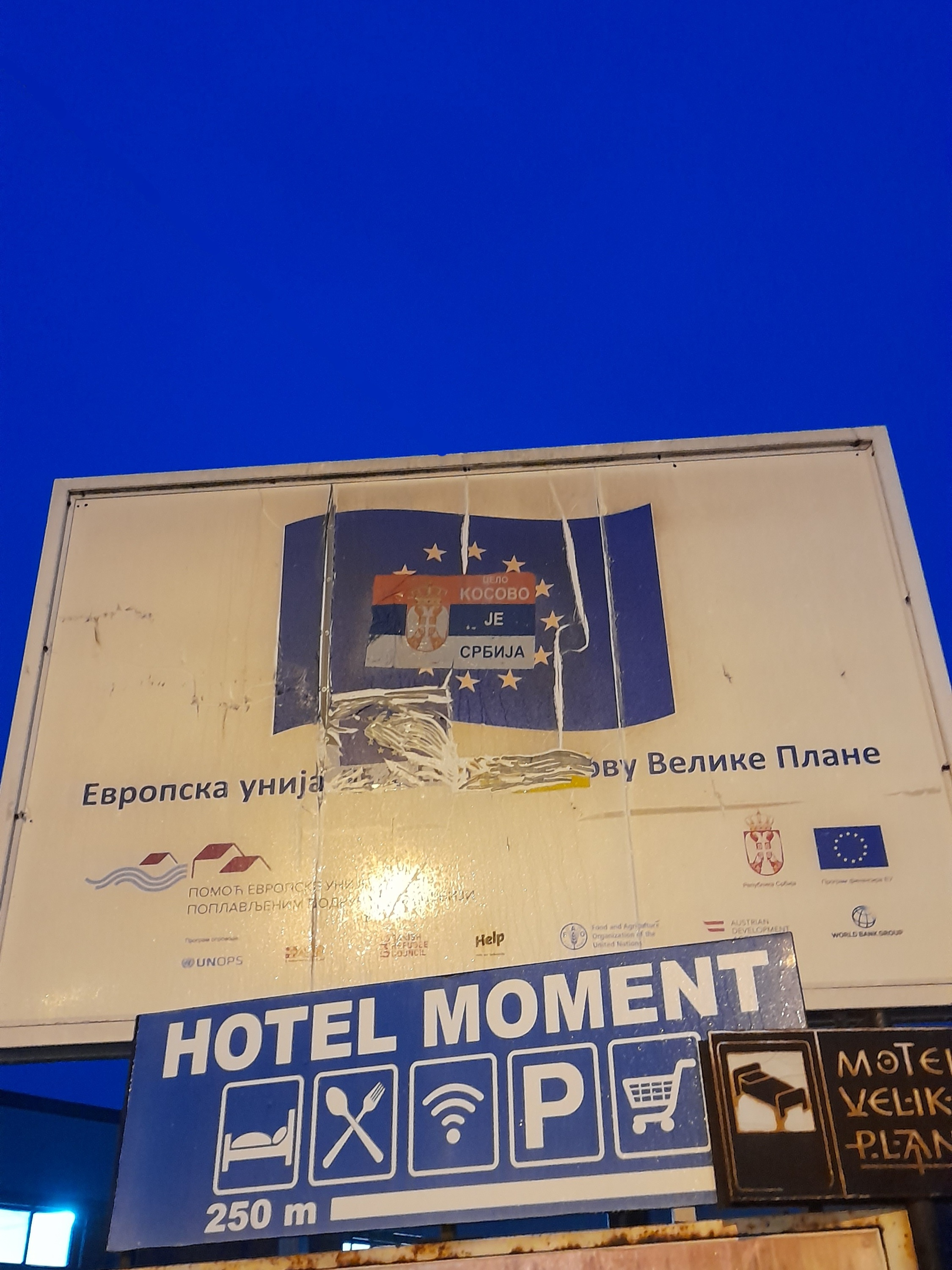
A sticker containing Kosovo is Serbia written on the Serbian flag stuck on a billboard promoting EU investment in Velika Plana

Historians as Noel Malcolm and Andrea R. Nagy commented on the slogan. Malcolm claimed that "Kosovo was not the cradle of Serbia as it was held by Serbs only centuries after they invaded the Balkans and then only for 250 years before the Ottoman occupation". Kosovo was conquered by the Kingdom of Serbia in 1912 and became part of Yugoslavia in 1918. Nagy states that In some sense this slogan is true, "but notes that Kosovo was administered by Serbia for only a short period".

== See also ==
- "Bessarabia, Romanian land"
- International recognition of Kosovo
- "Krymnash"
- Serbian nationalism
- Israeli settlements in the West Bank
