= Estonia in NATO operations =

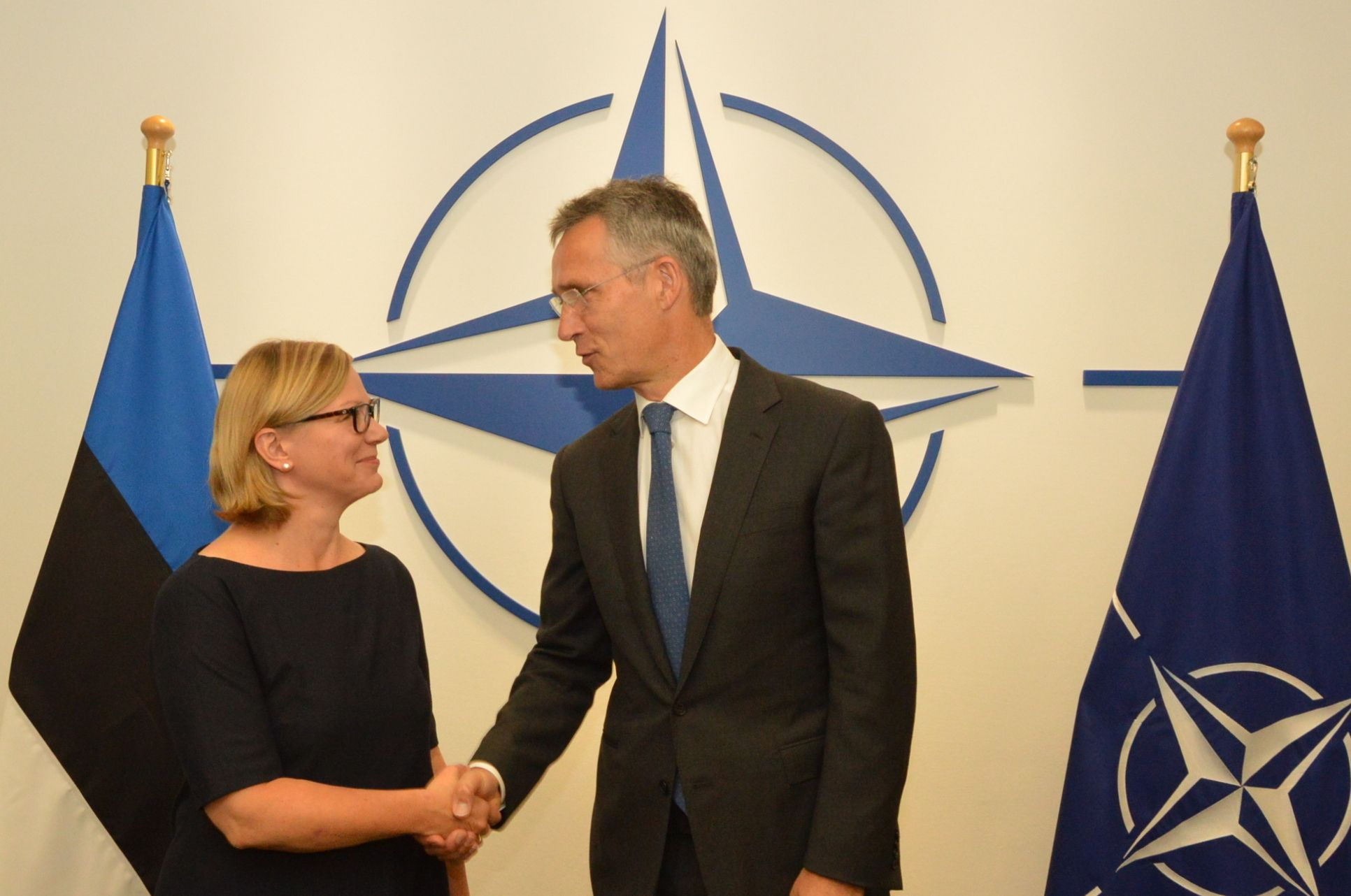
Estonian Ambassador to NATO Kyllike Sillaste-Elling and NATO Secretary General Jens Stoltenberg shaking hands

Estonia joined NATO in 2004. Since then, Estonia has participated in many joint military operations using its Estonian Defence Forces. Estonia has also participated in NATO-led military and peacekeeping operations before 2004.

== 1990–1999 ==
- Bosnia and Herzegovina (1995–2004)
  - Implementation Force (1995–1996), 1 year joint military peacekeeping enforcement led by NATO during the Bosnian War in the Yugoslav Wars.
  - Stabilization Force in Bosnia and Herzegovina (1995–2004), Joint military peacekeeping mission led by NATO after the Bosnian War.
- BALTOPS (1990s-present), Annual military exercise since the 1980s in the Baltic Sea, Estonia has participated in the exercises since the 1990s.

== 2000–2009 ==
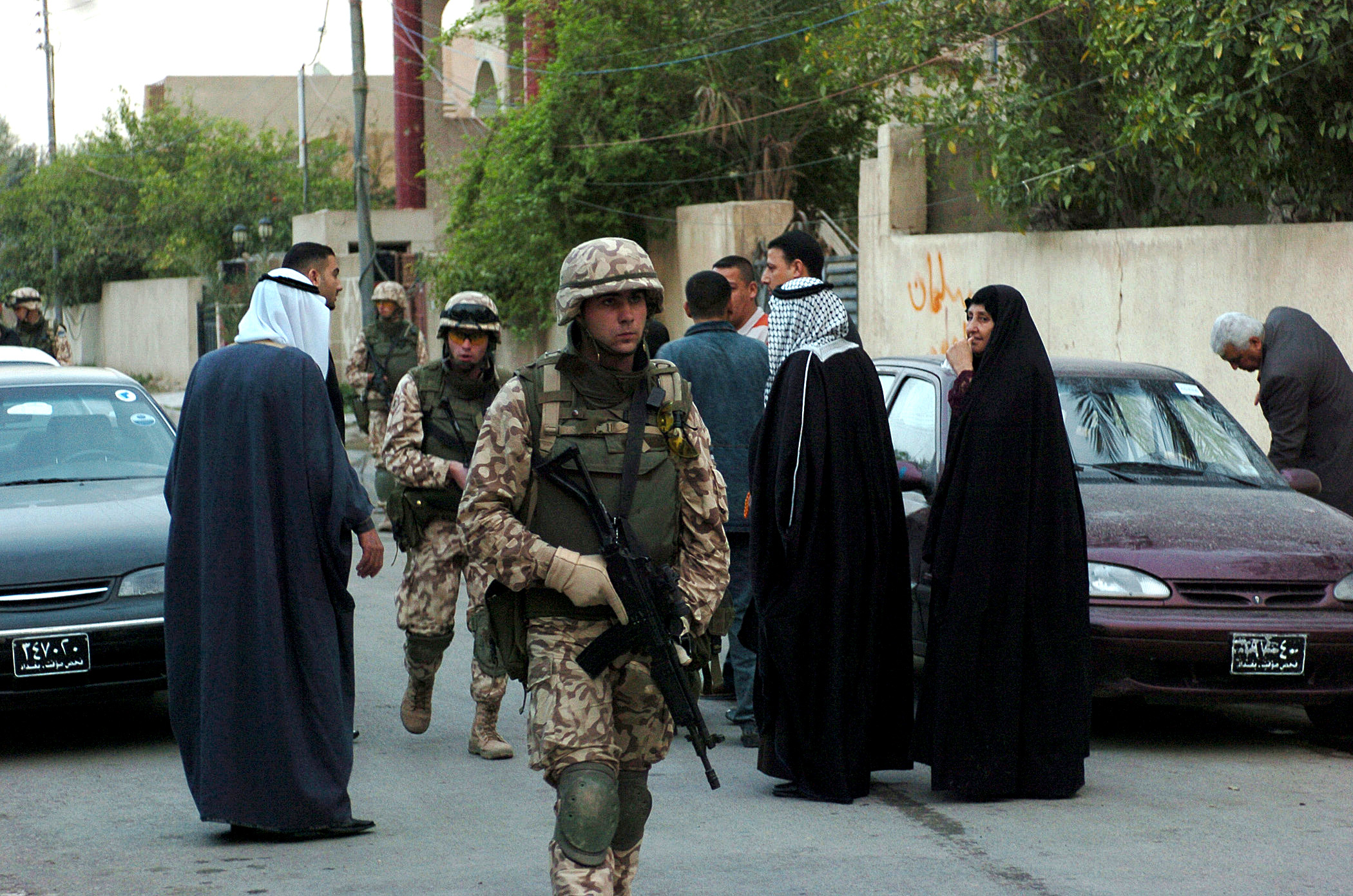
Estonian soldiers walking in Iraq armed with IMI Galil rifles (2005)

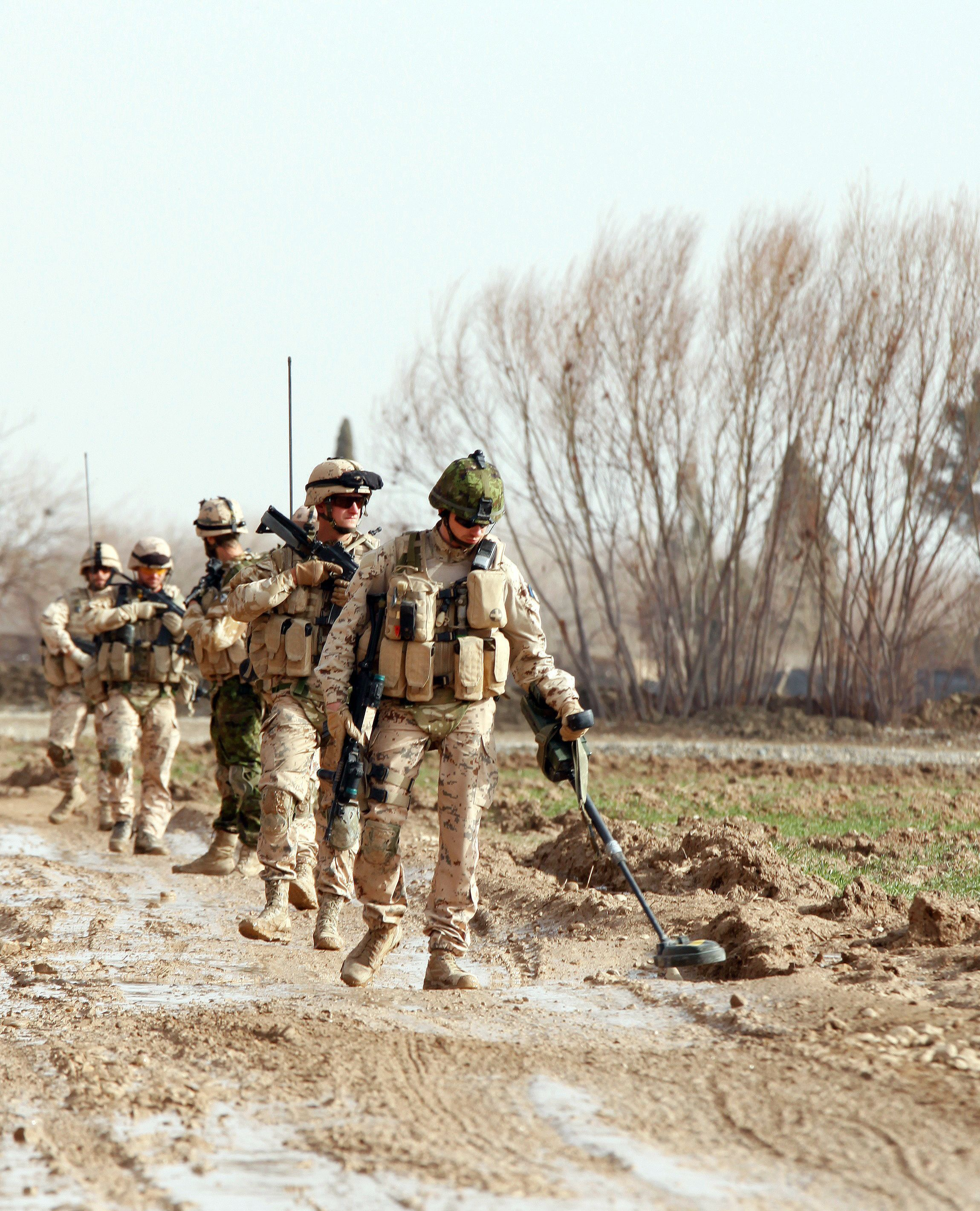
Estonian troops in Afghanistan clearing IEDs

- Iraq
  - Estonian Iraqi Contingent (2003–2008), Joint military force of the Estonian Defence Forces deployed in Iraq during the Iraq War mostly in the Baghdad Governorate in the Sab-al-Bori area
  - NATO Training Mission – Iraq (2004–present)
- Afghanistan (2003–2008)
  - Estonian Afghanistan Contingent (2003–2008), Joint military force of the Estonian Defence Forces deployed in Afghanistan during the War In Afghanistan. The units are under the allegiance of the International Security Assistance Force (ISAF)
- Kosovo (2003–present)
  - Estonian Kosovo Contingent (2003–present), joint military force of the Estonian Defence Forces deployed in Kosovo during Operation Joint Interprise (Commonly "Kosovo Force")
- Bosnia and Herzegovina (2005–2007)
  - ESTGUARD 1-3 (2005–2007), Estonian soldiers were stationed near Tuzla, Bosnia and Herzegovina at Camp Eagle.
- Cooperative Cyber Defence Centre of Excellence (2008–present), international mission to enhance cyber defence in NATO, which is headquartered in Tallinn, Estonia.

== 2010–2019 ==
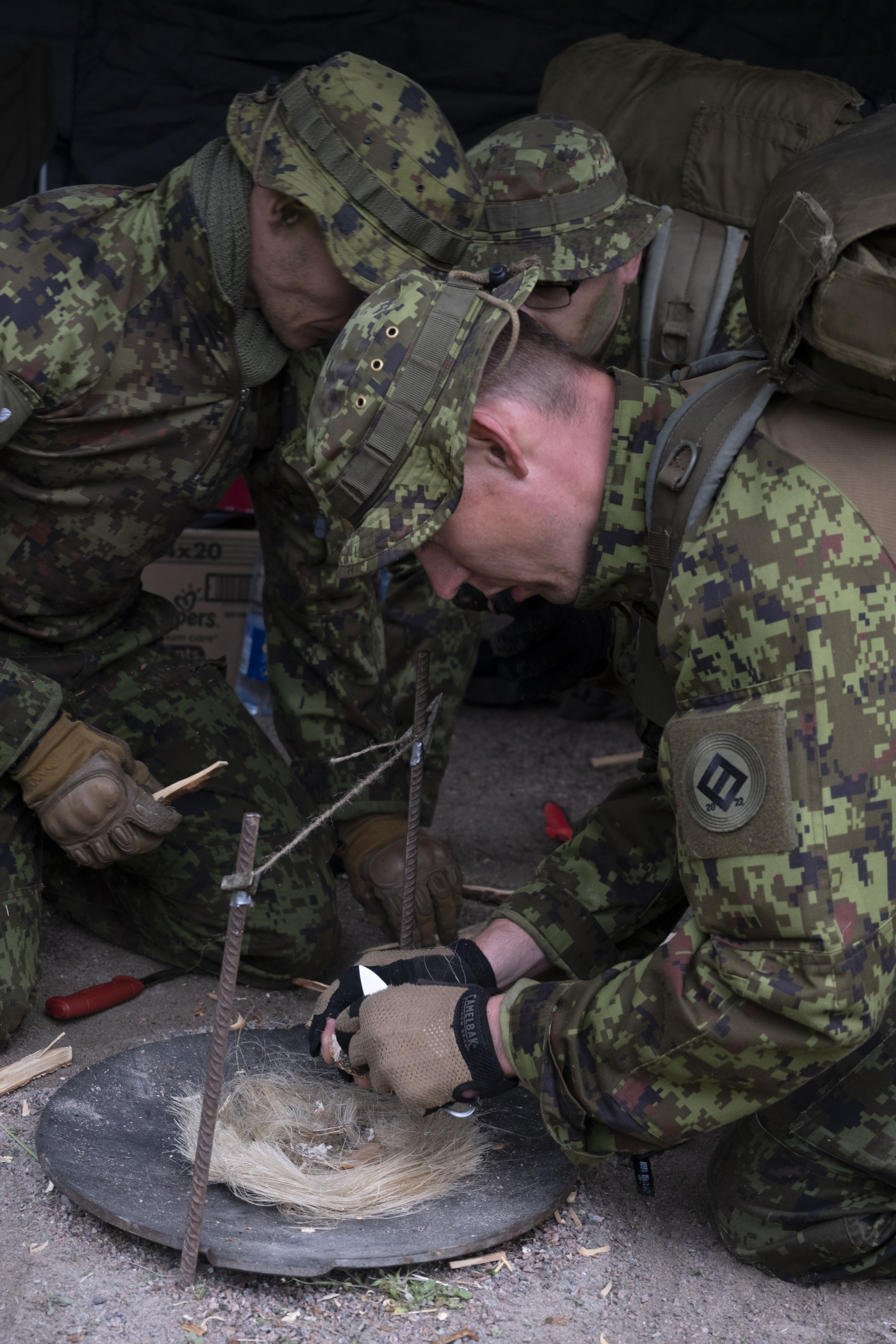
Photo of the Admiral Pitka Recon Challenge in 2022

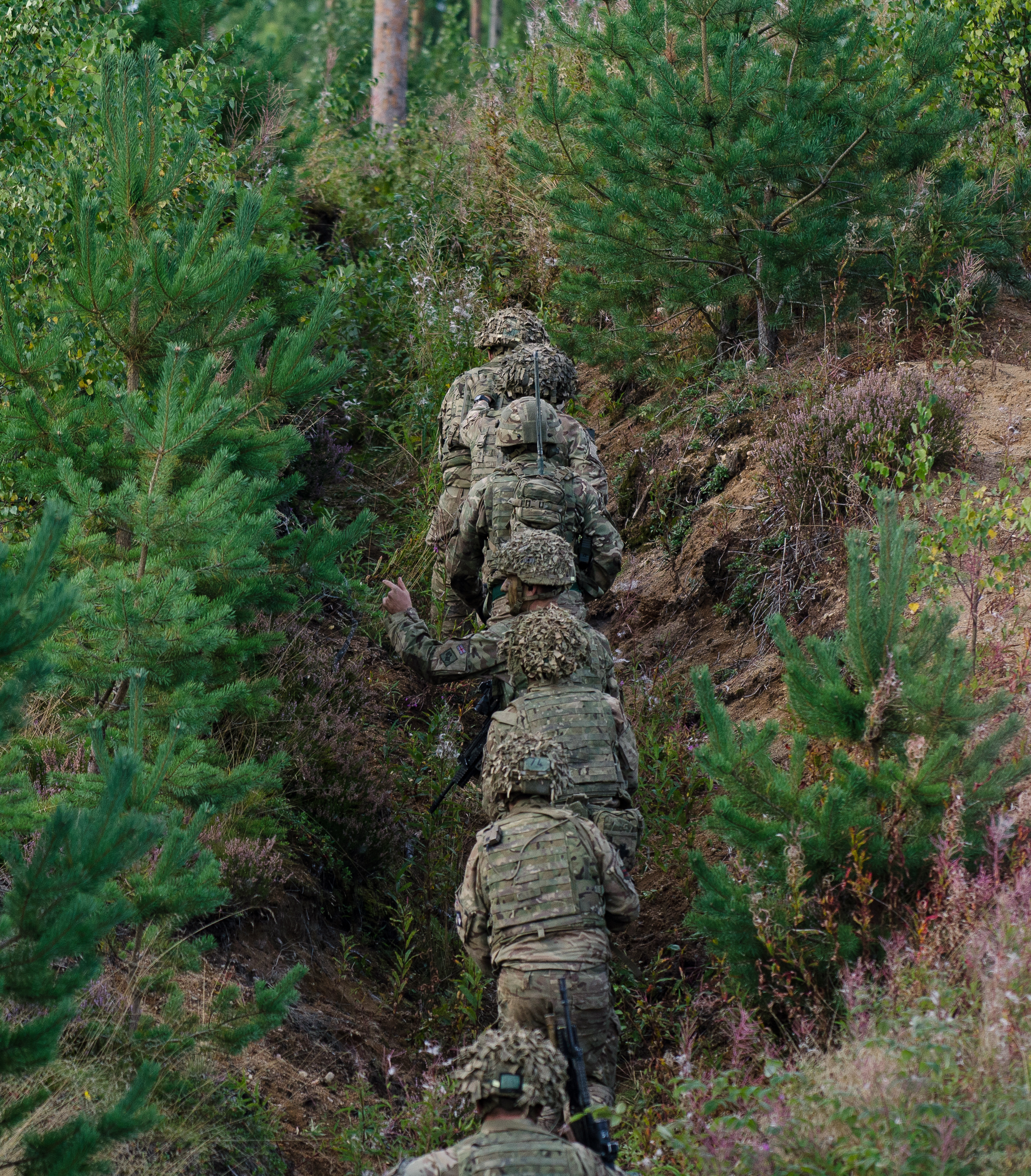
British troops exercise in Estonia as part of NATOs eFP program

- Cooperative Cyber Defence Centre of Excellence (2008–present)
  - Locked Shields (2010–present), annual cyber defence exercise between 1 and 30 April in Tallinn, Estonia.
- Admiral Pitka Recon Challenge (2013–present), annual military exercise in Estonia. Common participants are NATO nations.
- Operation Atlantic Resolve (2014–2018), military exercise conducted in response to the War in Donbas throughout Central and Eastern Europe.
- Afghanistan (2015–2021)
  - Resolute Support Mission (2015–2021), 45 troops from the Estonian Defense Forces were sent to Afghanistan and were withdrawn in 2021.
- NATO Enhanced Forward Presence (eFP) (2016–present), a constant military force in 8 European countries. There is ~2000 troops from different NATO countries in Tapa, Estonia.
- Sahel region of Africa (2018–2022)
  - Operation Barkhane (2018–2022), anti-insurgent operation led by France against Islamic extremism, Estonia has provided ~90 soldiers of mechanized and Special forces units.

== 2020–present ==
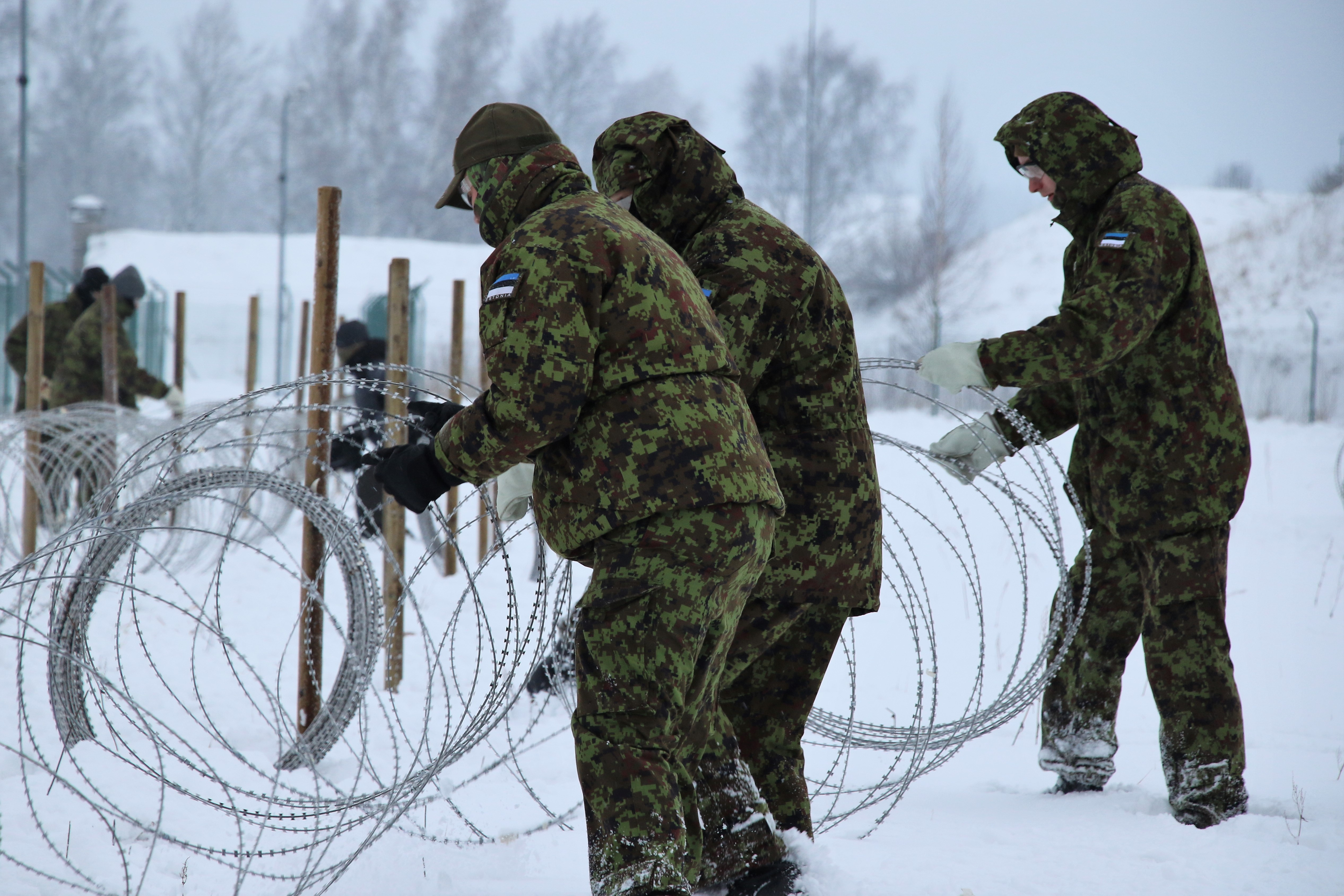
Members of the Wisent Task force 2 setting up barbed wire fences

- NATO Enhanced Forward Presence (eFP) (2016–present)
  - Spring Storm (May 2021), a large-scale exercise containing ~14,000 troops from eFP-participating countries in Estonia from 11 May to 31 May.
- Ramstein Alloy (2021), a series of exercises in the Baltic States which simulates Article 5 scenarios and cooperation with Finland and Sweden.
- Wisent (2021–2022), a Polish-Estonian joint operation.
  - Wisent 1 (December 2021), Estonian military unit, with around 70 troops, arrived in Poland, the unit and the 18th Infantry Division of Poland helped clean up and block/defend the border area due to the Belarusian border crisis.
  - Wisent 2, fortifications and defenses were constructed along the border with Belarus.
  - Wisent 3 (February 2022), The joint operation had continued with 60 troops which built barriers on the border, and built around 40 km (~25 mi) of border protection due to de-escalation of tensions in Ukraine.
  - Wisent 4 (April 2022), The Estonian and Polish troops concluded deployment with ceremony for Katyn victims.
  - Wisent 5 (April 2022), The joint-operative troops made 4 bridges, and the Polish guard started to patrol the border, and the group have improved road infrastructure along around 10 km (~6 mi) of the road.
- Operation Inherent Resolve (2023–present), a military operation in Iraq and Syria led by the United States (with NATO countries participating) since 2014. Estonia has participated since April 2023. Estonia will end its contribution to Operation Inherent Resolve by September 2025. At the time it was Estonia's largest foreign military operation, with up to 110 troops (one infatry company) participating. Estonia will continue participating in NATO Mission Iraq NMI.
- Cooperative Cyber Defence Centre of Excellence (2008–present)
  - Cyber Coalition (2023), cyber defence exercise in Tallinn, Estonia with 28 participating NATO countries and 7 non-NATO countries.
- Pikne (December 2024), a 2-week long military exercise with multiple participating countries. The exercise is part of NATO's Vigilance Activity Brilliant Eagle, practicing a rapid deployment of Estonian and allied forces to a conflict zone.

== See also ==
- History of Estonia
- Estonia–Russia relations
