= Allain Tikko =

Estonian military personnel (1979–2009)

- Born: 11 January 1979; Kõpu, Viljandi County, then part of Estonian SSR, Soviet Union
- Died: 15 June 2009 (aged 30); Nad Ali District, Helmand Province, Afghanistan
- Military career
- Branch: Estonian Defence Forces
- Rank: Veebel

Allain Tikko (11 January 1979 in Kõpu, Viljandimaa – 15 June 2009) was an Estonian warrant officer (veebel) in charge of a jagu (a small military unit) in ESTCOY-8, which had been posted in Afghanistan as a part of United Kingdom's military operations, itself a part of NATO continuing operations in Afghanistan.

== Service ==
Vbl Tikko began military service in 1998 in Battle School of EDF (Kaitseväe Lahingukool) and has served in the Scoutspataljon, the staff of the Maavägi (Ground Forces) and the operative department of the Headquarters of the Estonian Defence Forces. Before ESTCOY-8's mission in Afghanistan, Tikko had participated in three foreign missions: he had headed a section in Kosovo in 2003 as a part of the Baltic Reconnaissance Squadron (BALTSQN) for KFOR; he had headed an infantry section of ESTPLA-9 in Iraq in 2004, and he had served in Afghanistan in 2007 in ESTCOY-4.

== Awards ==
Vbl Tikko has been awarded a Service Medal of Estonian Defence Forces (Estonian: Kaitseväe teenetemärk) and a Service Medal for Battle Services of Estonian Defence Forces (Estonian: Kaitseväe teenetemärk lahinguliste teenete eest).

== Death ==
On early morning of 15 June 2009, vbl Tikko's squad was ambushed in about one kilometre from the Pimon patrol base in the Helmand province. Opposing combatants fired a rocket-propelled grenade upon the squad from about 400 m (1,312 ft), killing Tikko and wounding three other members of his unit.

== Background ==
Estonia has been participating in NATO operations in Afghanistan since 2003. Before vbl Tikko, three Estonian soldiers had died in the course of these operations.

After the scheduled five-month increase of military presence in July, intended to improve security during the upcoming presidential elections of Afghanistan, Estonian military contingent will be the second largest (after the United States) of the participating NATO forces.
