= Estonian Kosovo Contingent =

Estonian military unit in Kosovo

- Active: 2003-2018
- Country: Estonia
- Allegiance: Kosovo Force (KFOR)
- Branch: Estonian Defence Forces
- Type: platoon
- Size: 50
- Garrison/HQ: Kosovska Mitrovica and Pristina

The Estonian Kosovo Contingent or (simply Kosovo Contingent) is a joint military force of the Estonian Defence Forces deployed in northern Kosovo, in the area of Kosovska Mitrovica. Estonia officially ended the deployment in 2018.

== History ==
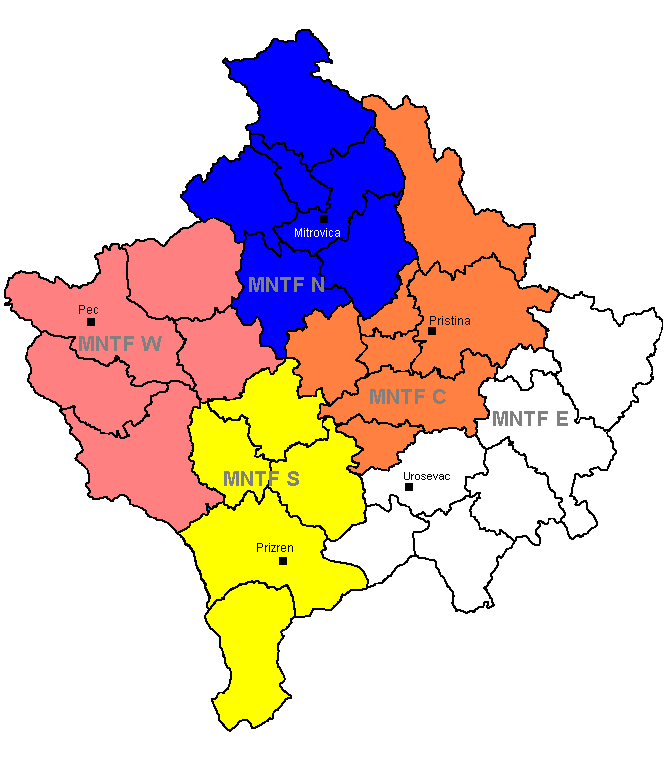
Estonian units rotating in the blue zone in Kosovska Mitrovica.

Estonia has participated on different Kosovo missions since 1999 when the first unit, ESTPATROL-1, part of the Kosovo Force (KFOR) forces in the region, became operational. From 1999 to 2006 a total of 14 Estonian units served in Kosovo. From 2003 to 2006 a joint Baltic infantry company BALTSQN also rotated in Kosovo. In February 2007 Estonia once again started rotations on Kosovo mission with a platoon size unit.

=== Former deployments ===
This the order of battle of the known units that have operated within the Estonian Kosovo Contingent:

- ESTRIF-3
- ESTRIF-2
- ESTPATROL-14
- ESTPATROL-13
- ESTPATROL-12
- ESTPATROL-11
- ESTPATROL-10
- ESTPATROL-9
- ESTPATROL-8
- ESTPATROL-7
- ESTPATROL-6
- ESTPATROL-5
- ESTPATROL-4
- ESTPATROL-3
- ESTPATROL-2
- ESTPATROL-1

- BALTSQN-13
- BALTSQN-10
- BALTSQN-7

== See also ==
- KFOR - Kosovo Force
- Estonian Iraqi Contingent
- Estonian Afghanistan Contingent
- List of Estonian Contingencies
