= Wisent (disambiguation) =

Wisent is an alternative name for the European bison.

Wisent may also refer to:

- Wisent (eisbrecher) an icebreaker operated by the German Wasser und Schifffahrtsamt
- Wisent (co-operative exercise), a series of Polish-Estonian joint-military exercises
- Wisent (vehicle), a German military vehicle
- Wisent (vodka), a flavored Polish vodka
