= Harri Tiido =

Estonian diplomat (born 1953)

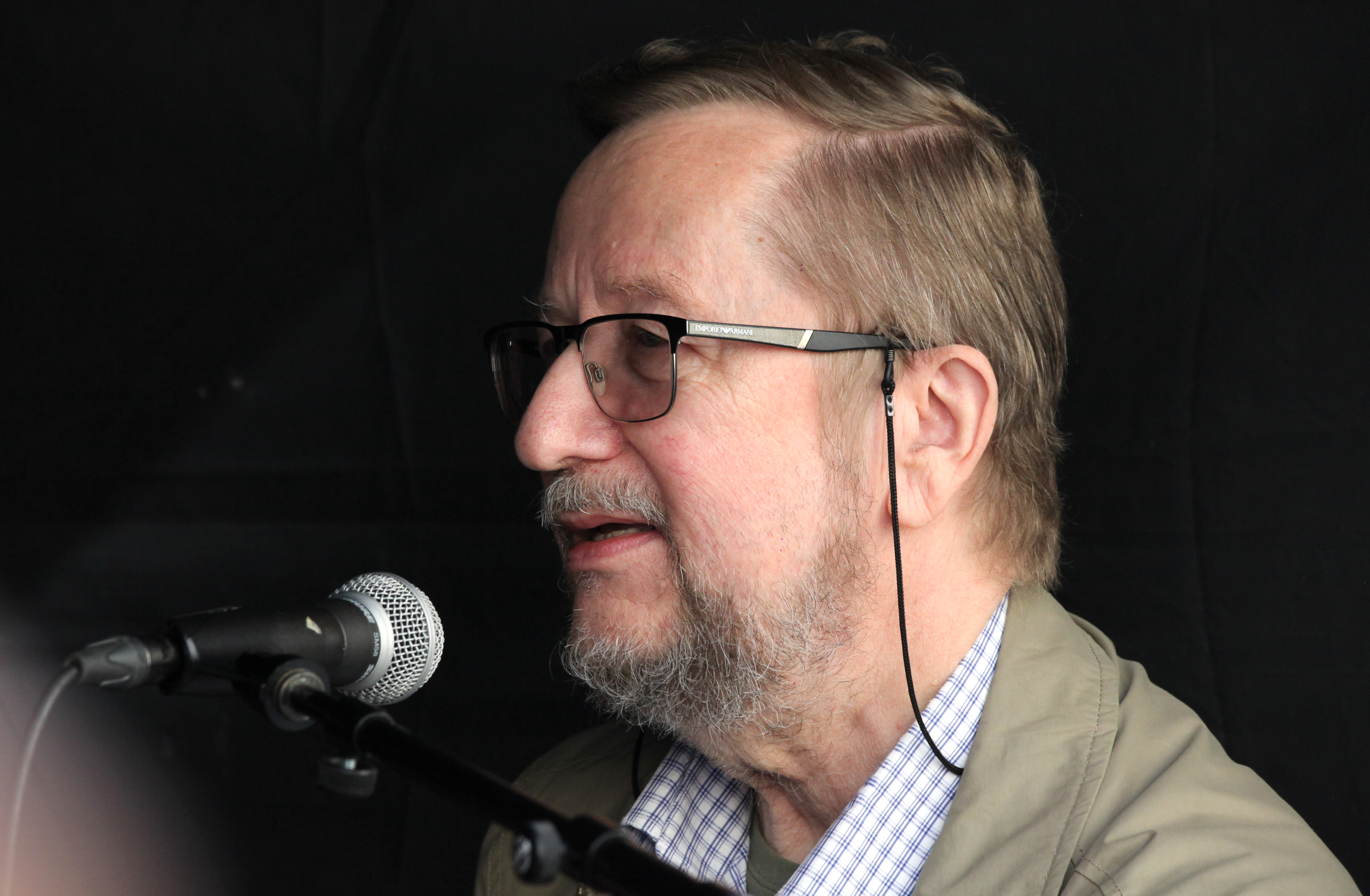
- Tiido in 2021

Harri Tiido Estonian ambassador to NATO
- In office 2003–2007

Ambassador of Estonia to Afghanistan
- In office 2008–2012

Ambassador of Estonia to Poland
- In office 2014–2018
- President: Toomas Hendrik Ilves; Kersti Kaljulaid
- Prime Minister: Andrus Ansip; Taavi Rõivas
- Preceded by: Eerik Marmei
- Succeeded by: Martin Roger

Ambassador of Estonia to Finland
- In office 2018–2020
- President: Toomas Hendrik Ilves; Kersti Kaljulaid
- Prime Minister: Andrus Ansip; Taavi Rõivas
- Preceded by: Margus Laidre
- Succeeded by: Sven Sakkov

Personal details
- Born: Harri Tiido; 8 October 1953 (age 73) Jõhvi, Estonia
- Education: University of Tartu
- Occupation: Diplomat
- Awards: 2004 Order of the White Star, III class

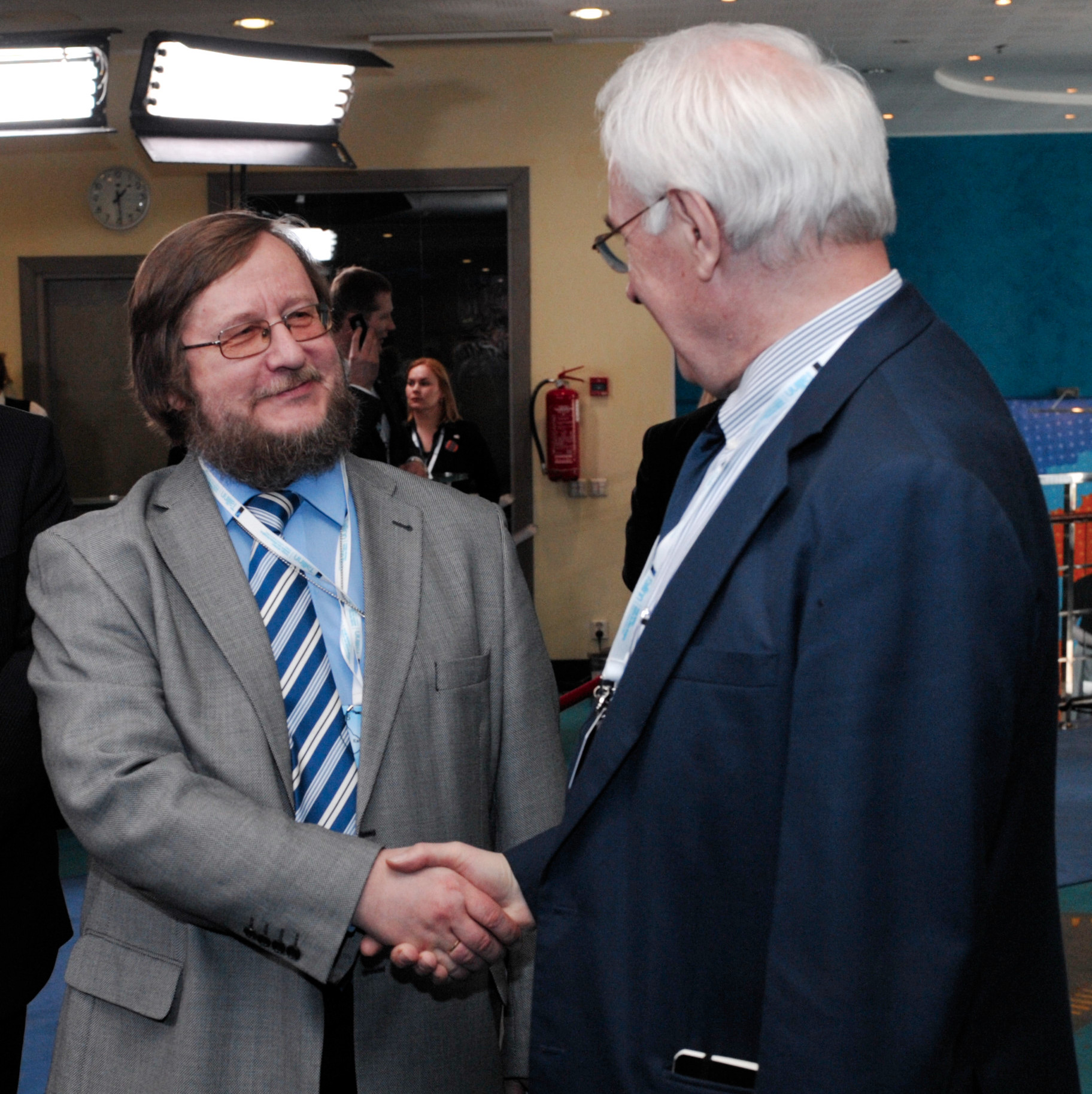
Harri Tiido

Harri Tiido (born 8 October 1953 in Jõhvi) is an Estonian diplomat.

Tiido graduated from University of Tartu in Romance-Germanic philology. Since 1980 he has worked as a journalist at Estonian Radio and Kuku Radio. From 1996 to 1997, Tiido worked for the radio Voice of America. From 1997 to 2000, Tiido was chief editor of Kuku Radio.

Since 2000, Tiido has been serving the Estonian Foreign Ministry. From 2003 to 2007 Tiido served as Estonian ambassador to NATO. From 2008 to 2012, Tiido was non-resident Ambassador of Estonia to Afghanistan and from 2014 to 2018, Tiido served as Ambassador of Estonia to Poland. From 2018 to 2020, Tiido served as Ambassador of Estonia to Finland.

== Awards ==
- 2004: Order of the White Star, III class.
