= Tõnis Soop =

Estonian painter (1937–2016)

- Born: July 27, 1937; Kõpu, Viljandi County, Estonia
- Died: March 16, 2016 (aged 78); Tallinn, Estonia
- Education: Tartu Art School; Estonian Academy of Arts
- Occupations: Painter, teacher

Tõnis Soop (July 27, 1937 – March 16, 2016) was an Estonian painter and teacher.

== Early life and education ==
Tõnis Soop was born to Tõnis Soop (1889–1953) and Elli Soop (née Laderlich, 1905–1987) at the Kingu farm on the estate of Suure-Kõpu Manor. From 1952 to 1957, he studied at the Tartu School of Fine Arts, graduating as a teacher of drawing and sketching. He then studied drawing and painting at the Tallinn Pedagogical Institute for two years. In 1965, he enrolled in the Estonian National Art Institute and studied painting. He graduated in 1971 as a painter and teacher.

== Career ==
During his studies and afterward, Soop worked as a drawing teacher from 1958 to 1966, as an artist at the Estonian SSR State Philharmonic from 1960 to 1961, at Estonian Industrial Project Design from 1965 to 1987, and at the Kirov Collective Fishing Farm (later Esmar) from 1972 to 1992.

Soop organized and taught various art courses, including calligraphy. In 1963, he organized inter-school art classes in Kohtla-Järve. He also lectured at the Tallinn Pedagogical Institute and was an instructor in preparatory courses at the Estonian National Art Institute. He taught courses at the Estonian SSR Republican Teacher Training Institute and in Värska, Saint Petersburg, and Pärnu.

An important part of his life was the Viimsi Art School, which he founded in 1977. He was also the first director of this school, and he worked there as an art teacher.

== Work ==
The flag of Viimsi Parish, designed by Tõnis Soop

As an artist, Soop mainly created oil and watercolor paintings, but he also produced large-scale works using the sgraffito technique (e.g., Kalad (Fish) in the lobby of the Esmar building in Viimsi and sgraffito in the building of the former high school in Viimsi), large advertising works, and wooden sculptures (e.g., Konn (Frog) for the Viimsi Winter Garden), and he designed books. Soop designed the coat of arms and flag of Viimsi Parish.

His style of painting changed over time, varying from cubism (especially in his earlier works) to impressionistic textured painting. His works are characterized by a striking palette of colors and bold brushstrokes.

== Exhibitions ==
Soop exhibited his paintings at personal exhibitions from 1956 onward. Foreign exhibitions of his works were held in Mongolia, Japan, Russia, Norway, and Sweden.
