= Kõpu =

Borough in Estonia

- Small borough
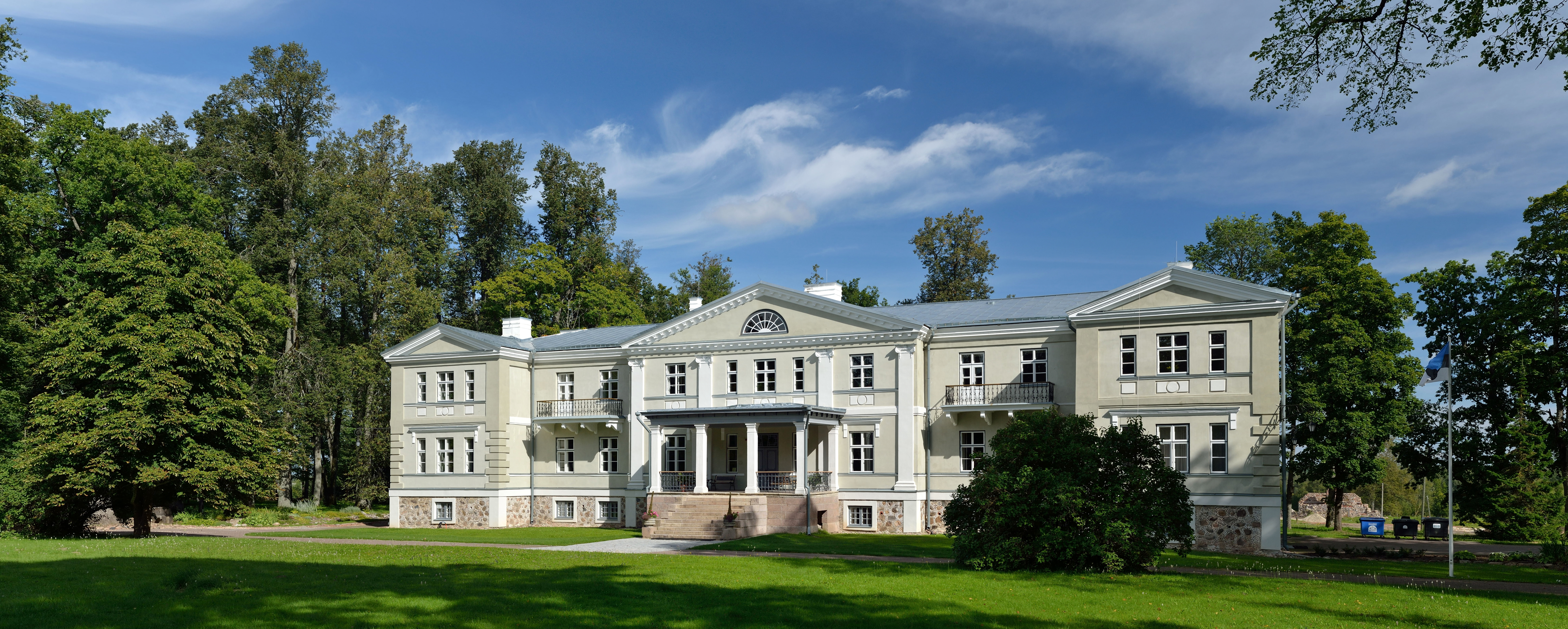
- Suure-Kõpu Manor

- Location in Estonia
- Coordinates: 58°19′36″N 25°18′23″E
- Country: Estonia
- County: Viljandi County
- Municipality: Põhja-Sakala Parish

Population (1 January 2020)
  - Total: 261

Kõpu (German: Fellin-Köppo) is a small borough (Estonian: alevik) in Viljandi County, Estonia. It was the administrative centre of Kõpu Parish.

== Suure-Kõpu Manor ==
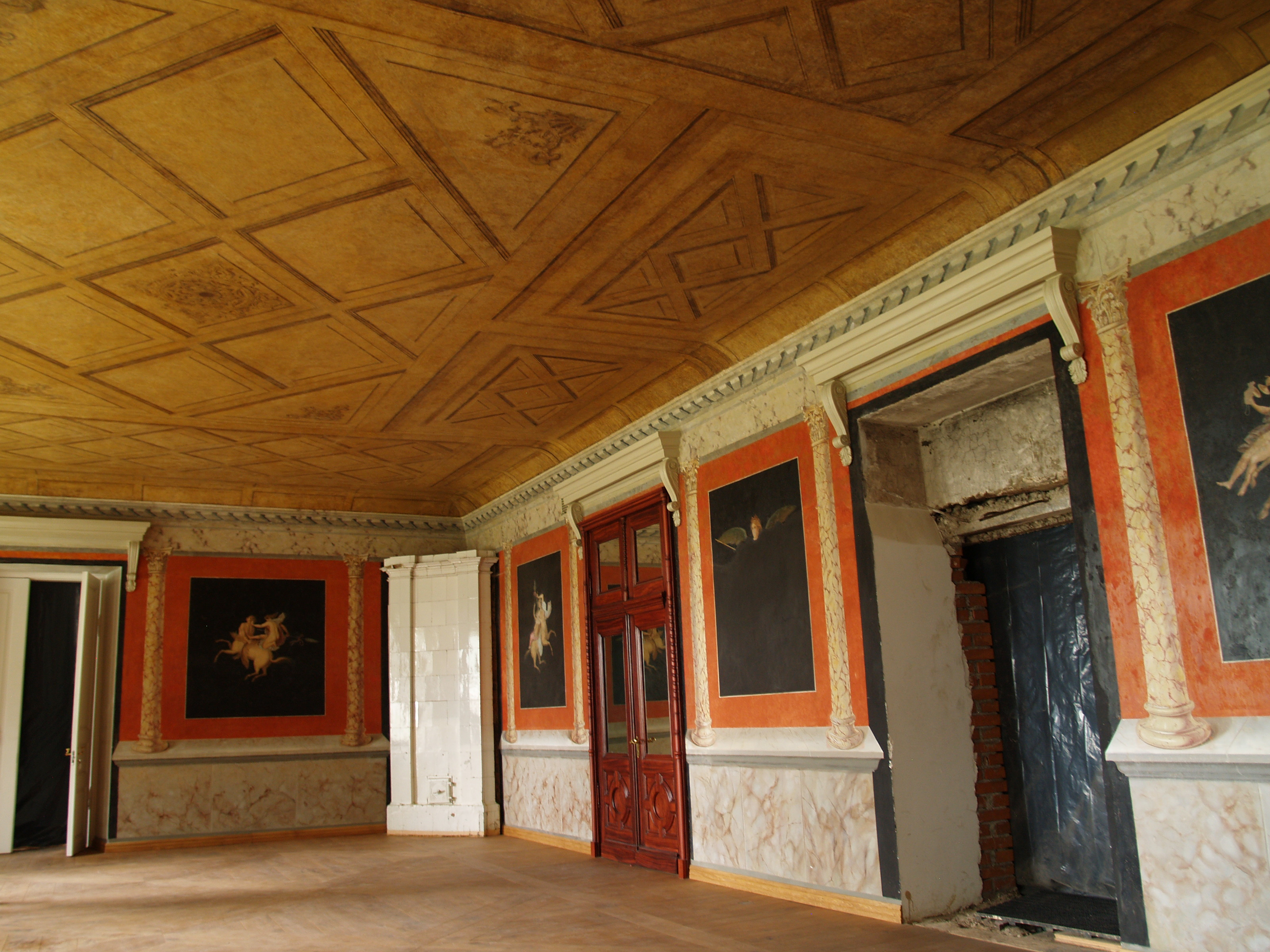
Restored interior of Suure-Kõpu Manor

Suure-Kõpu Manor (German: Gross-Köppo), located in the village, has a history that goes back to 1487. During most of its history it belonged to various Baltic aristocratic families. After Estonia gained its independence in 1919, the manor started being used as a schoolhouse. The current building was erected in 1847 and is one of the latest classicist manor houses in Estonia. The rather large manor house shows a close resemblance with the Kuremaa Manor House, which was built by the same architect, Emil Julius Strauss. From the outset, the manor house was lavishly decorated inside with frescoes and wall paintings in the classicist style, and later Art Nouveau decoration in papier-mâché and imitation stucco were added. However, during the Soviet occupation of Estonia, these decorations were deemed unfitting and painted over. They were rediscovered in the 1970s and have been painstakingly restored in recent years.

== Notable people ==
- Tõnis Soop (1937–2016), painter
- Allain Tikko (1979–2009), army officer killed in Afghanistan

== Gallery ==
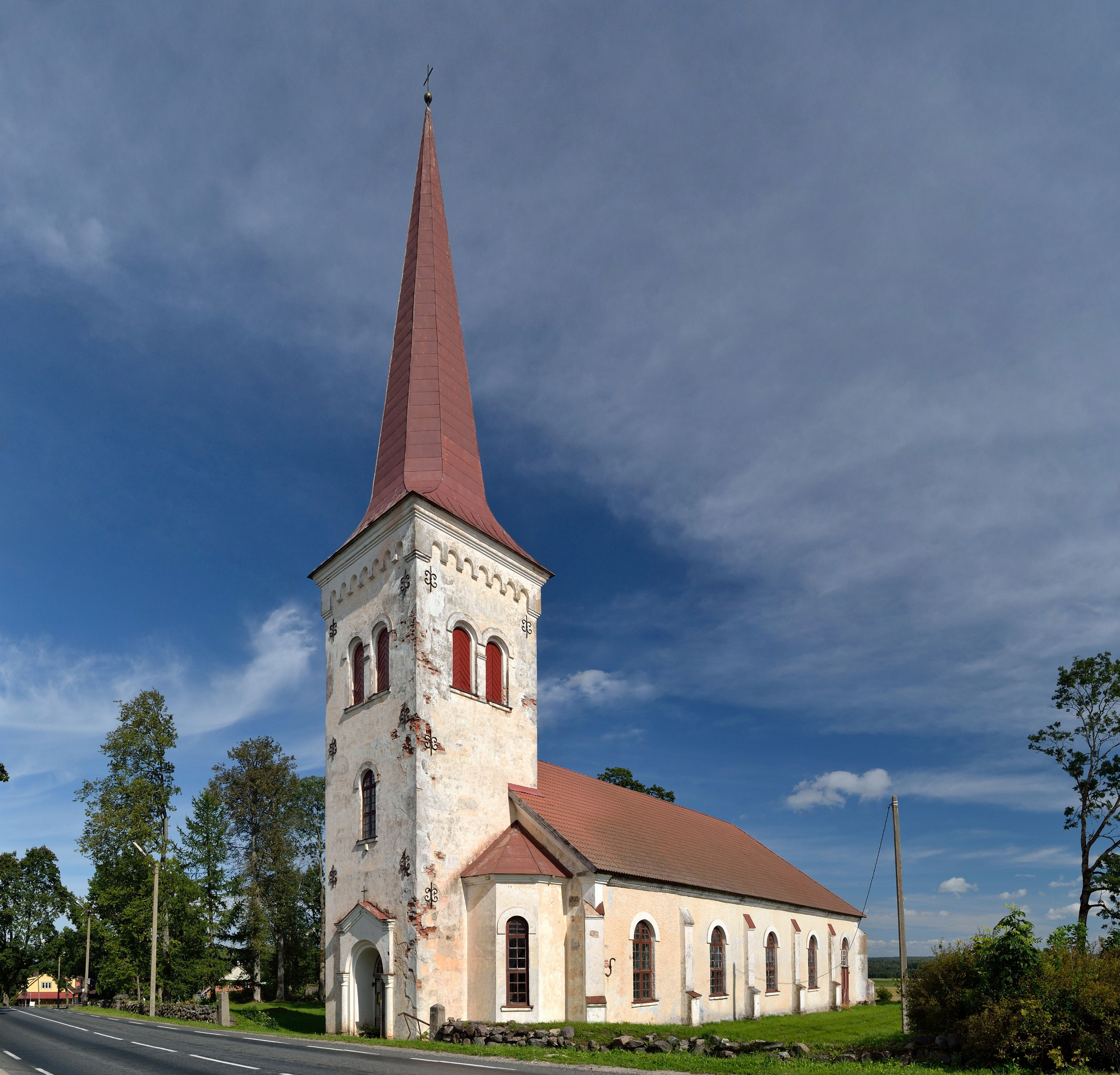
Kõpu church

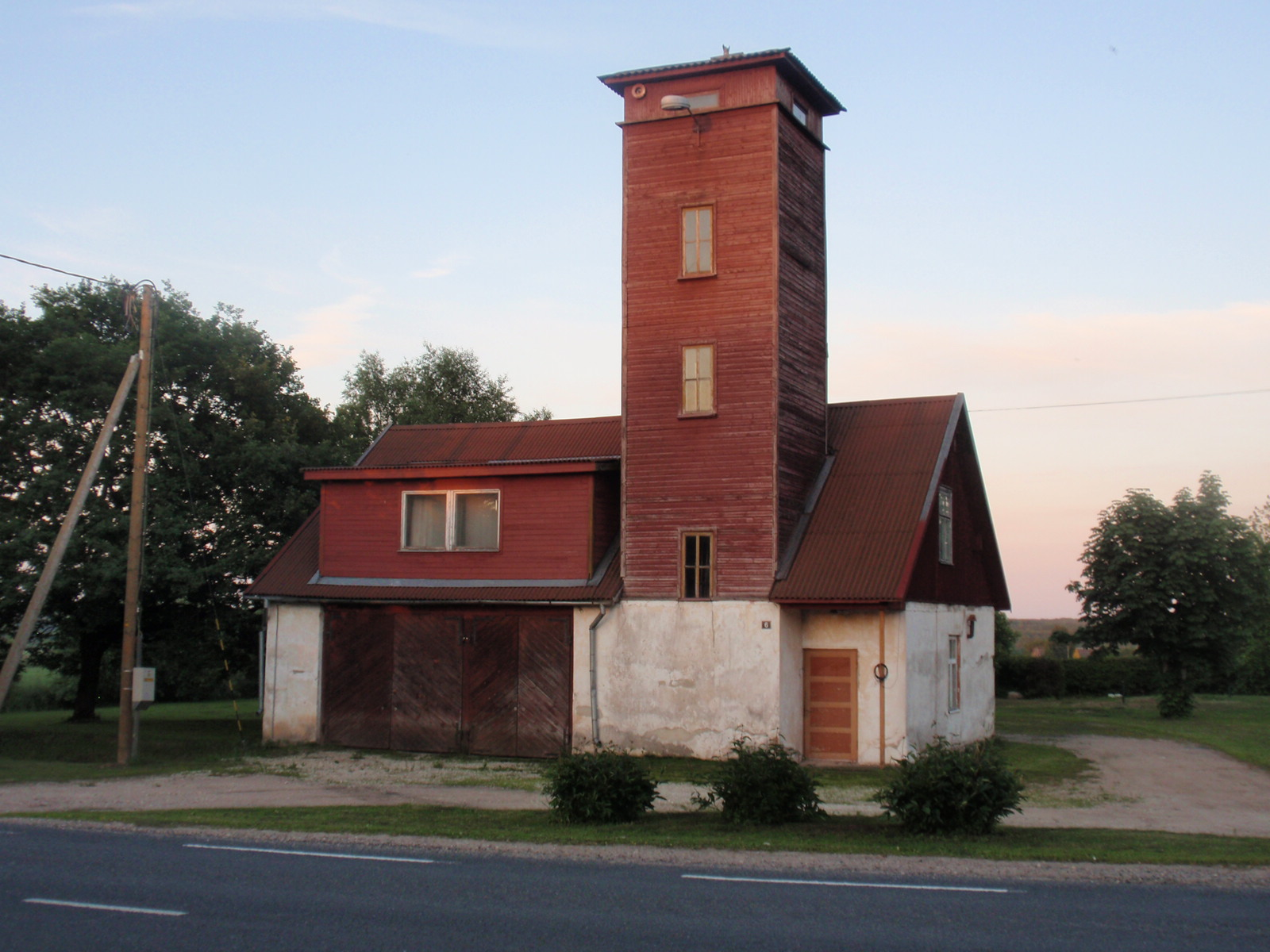
Firehouse

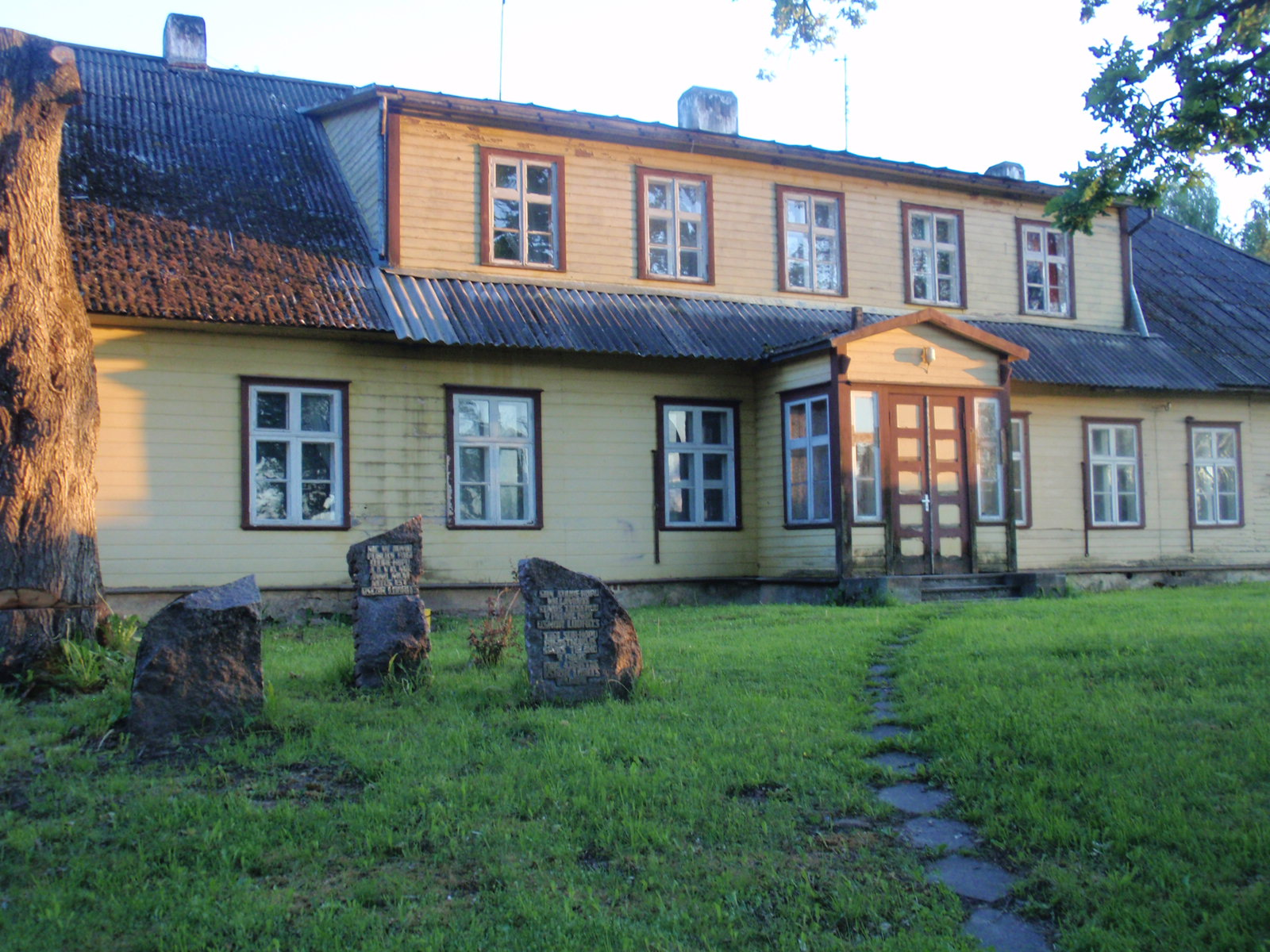
Old parish house

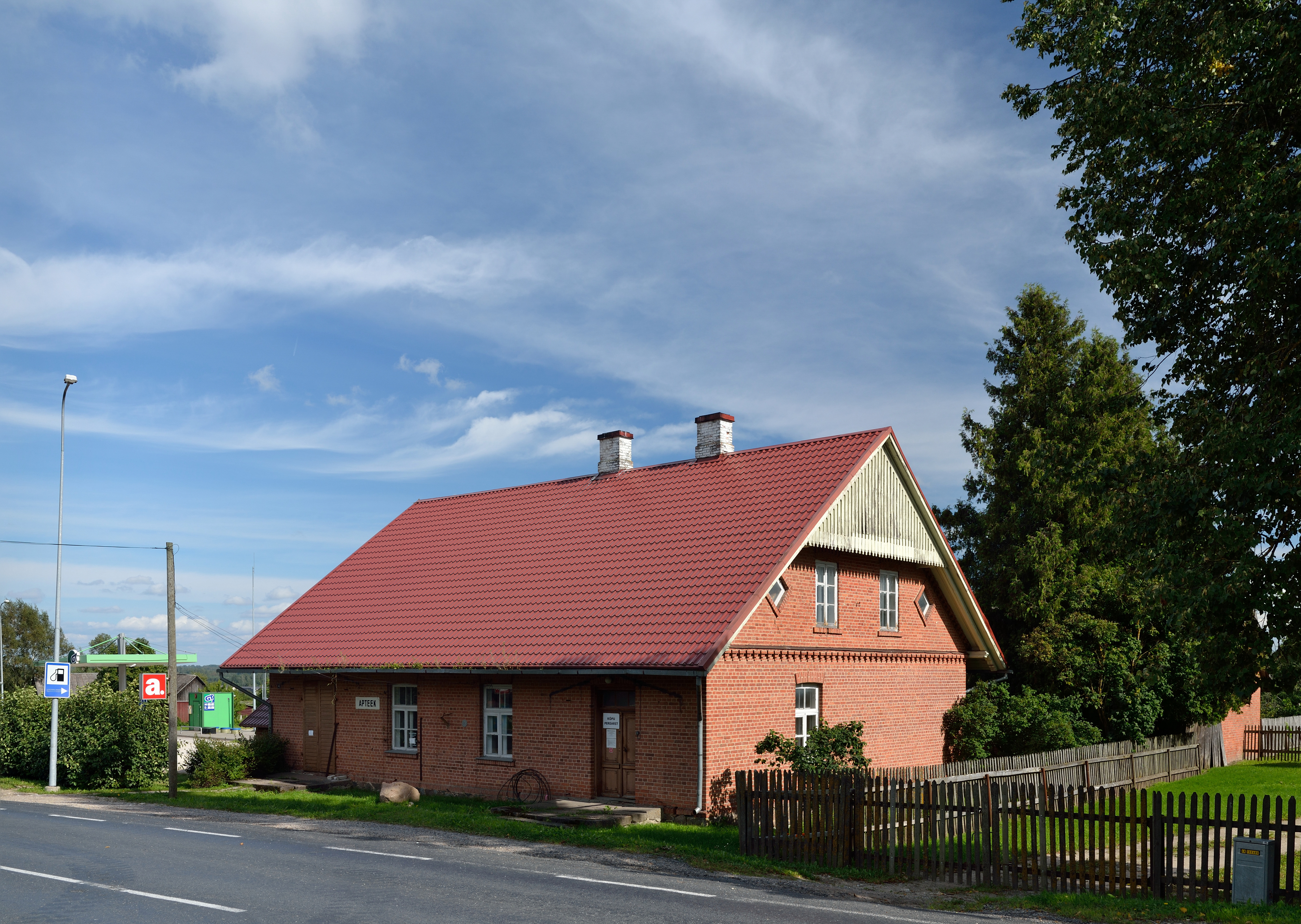
Kõpu pharmacy

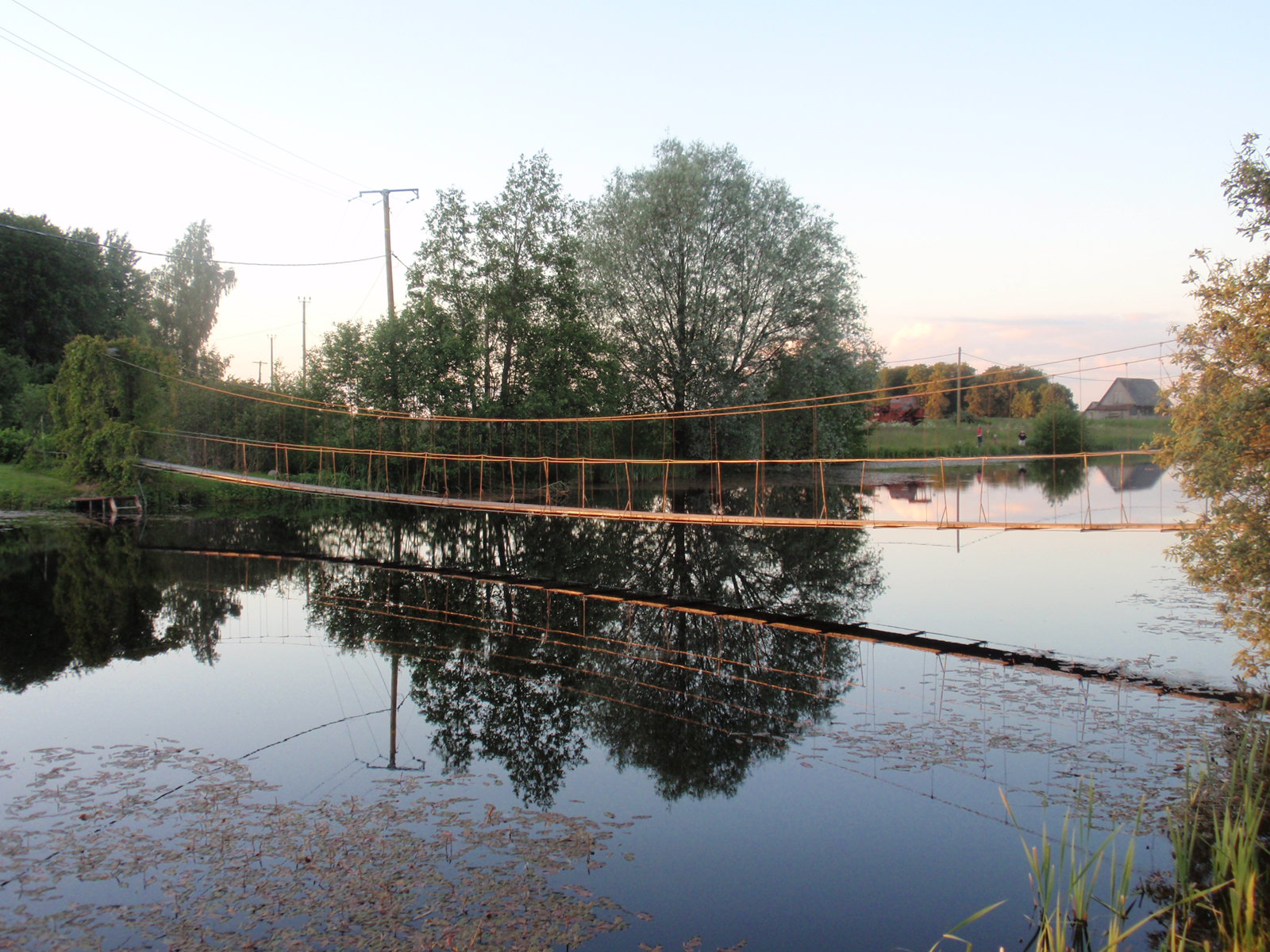
Suspension bridge over Lake Kõpu

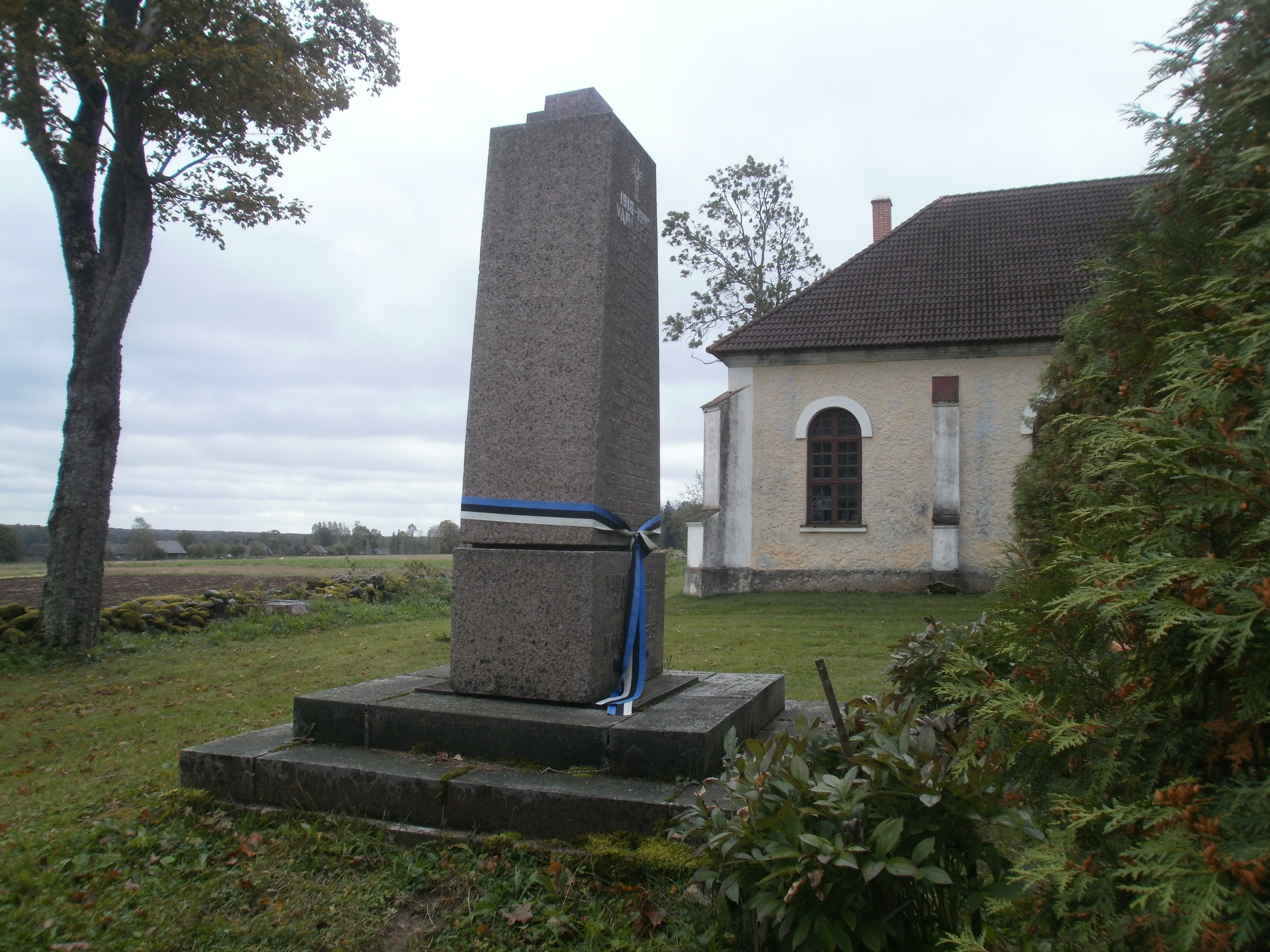
Memorial to the Estonian War of Independence

== See also ==
- List of palaces and manor houses in Estonia
