= Estonia–Poland relations =

Bilateral relations of Estonia and Poland

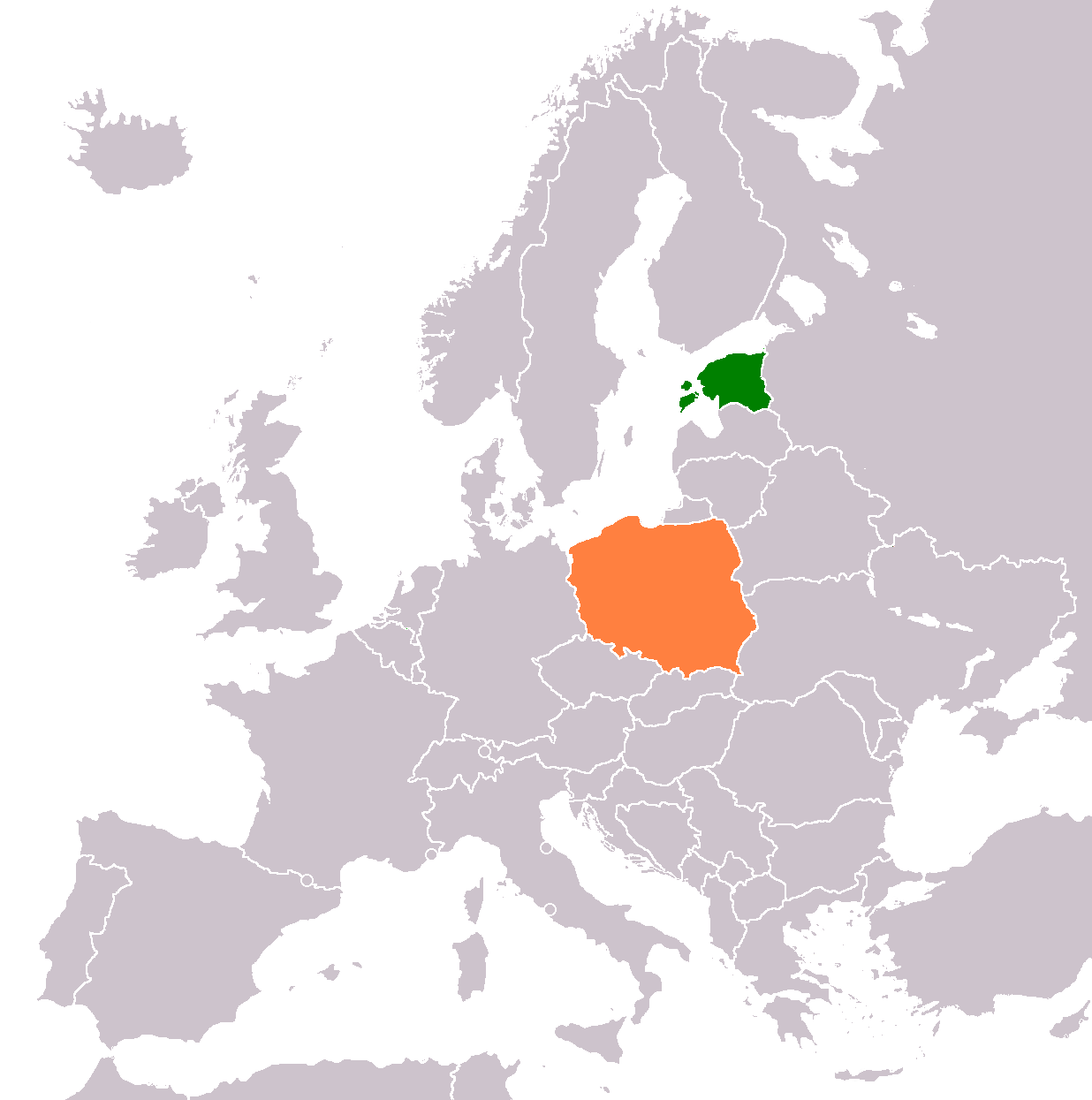
- Estonia: Poland

Estonia–Poland relations are the bilateral relations between Estonia and Poland. Estonia has an embassy in Warsaw. Poland has an embassy in Tallinn. Both nations are members of the EU, NATO, OECD, OSCE, Bucharest Nine, TSI, United Nations, COE, CBSS, HELCOM and WTO. The two countries became members of the EU in 2004.

== History ==
=== Early history ===
The flag of Tartu in Estonia, granted to the city by Polish King Stephen Báthory, closely resembles the flag of Poland

Estonia, then part of Livonia, was incorporated into the territory of Grand Duchy of Lithuania and later, the Polish–Lithuanian Commonwealth, which become Duchy of Livonia under Polish rule. The Livonian War further secured Polish authority, having halted Russian attempt to conquer the region. Lajs (modern Laiuse, Estonia) was the seat of northernmost starostwo of Poland, whereas Dorpat (Tartu) and Parnawa (Pärnu) were the northernmost voivodeship capitals of Poland. Livonia did not hold any significant position in the Commonwealth's history since it was divided between the Poles, Swedes and Danes; as for its remoteness outside tax incomes, and this would remain until both fell into the hand of the Russian Empire. The still-used flag of Tartu, the second-largest city of Estonia, was granted to the city by Polish King Stephen Báthory in 1584. It closely resembles the flag of Poland.

Under the Russian rule however, Livonia, and later Estonia, was seen to be the least oppressed under the rule of tsarist Russia and received a nominal level of autonomy, notably the rise of Orthodox Christianity; however, Congress Poland and later Russian Poland did not receive similar sympathy, and was under complete oppression led by the Russian Imperial government. Nonetheless, in 1905, unrests in Russia became widespread and it hit to Estonia and Poland. For the Estonians, their major opponent was not the Russians but the Germans at the time, but since the Germans were given privileges in Russia, anti-German unrest in Estonia aimed directly against tsarist authoritarian rule. For the Poles, the Russians and Germans were both common oppressors, also rose up against both.

=== Interbellum and World War II ===
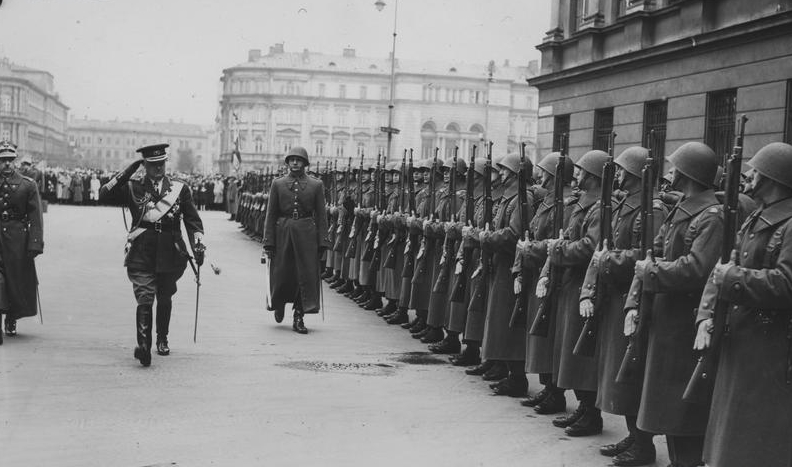
General Johan Laidoner, Commander-in-Chief of the Estonian Armed Forces, in Warsaw in 1939

After the end of World War I, both Estonia and Poland regained independence. However, increasing invasions from the Bolsheviks put two nations into one common front against the Soviet Russians. Estonia was not able to repel the Soviets, but Polish success in the Polish–Soviet War helped both to keep their independence. From 1920s, Poland and Estonia were allies, though there was little contact between them. In 1922, Poland and Estonia were among signatories of the Warsaw Accord, which however did not enter into force, as its other signatory Finland did not ratify it under pressure of Germany, which was hostile to Poland. Instead, in 1925, Poland and Estonia together with Finland and Latvia signed a convention on conciliation and arbitration in Helsinki. A trade and navigation treaty was signed between Estonia and Poland in Tallinn in 1927.

In 1937–1938, both ethnic Poles and Estonians in the Soviet Union were subjected to genocidal campaigns carried out by the NKVD, known as the Polish Operation and the Estonian Operation respectively. Following the Molotov–Ribbentrop Pact, Poland and Estonia were both invaded and occupied during World War II. Poland was occupied by Nazi Germany and the Soviet Union since September 1939, while Estonia was occupied solely by the Soviet Union since June 1940. Both nations were under common oppression, and many Poles and Estonians were forcefully deported by the Russians to Siberia. In the course of Operation Barbarossa, from mid-1941, both countries were entirely occupied by Germany. In 1942, Polish Prime Minister-in-Exile Władysław Sikorski's intervention to British and American authorities thwarted Soviet attempts to obtain Allied approval for the planned annexation of Estonia and eastern Poland. Both Poles and Estonians were among the prisoners of the Nazi German Sonnenburg concentration camp in Słońsk, and Estonian conscripts from the Soviet Red Army, alike Polish POWs and civilians were among the prisoners of the Stalag II-B German prisoner-of-war camp in Czarne.

In 1944–1945, both countries were again occupied by Soviet forces. Soviet repressions and deportations of both Estonian and Polish citizens continued. Poland's formal independence was eventually restored, although with a Soviet-installed communist regime, while Estonia was annexed into the Soviet Union, thus both had no relationship until the dissolution of the Soviet Union.

== Today ==
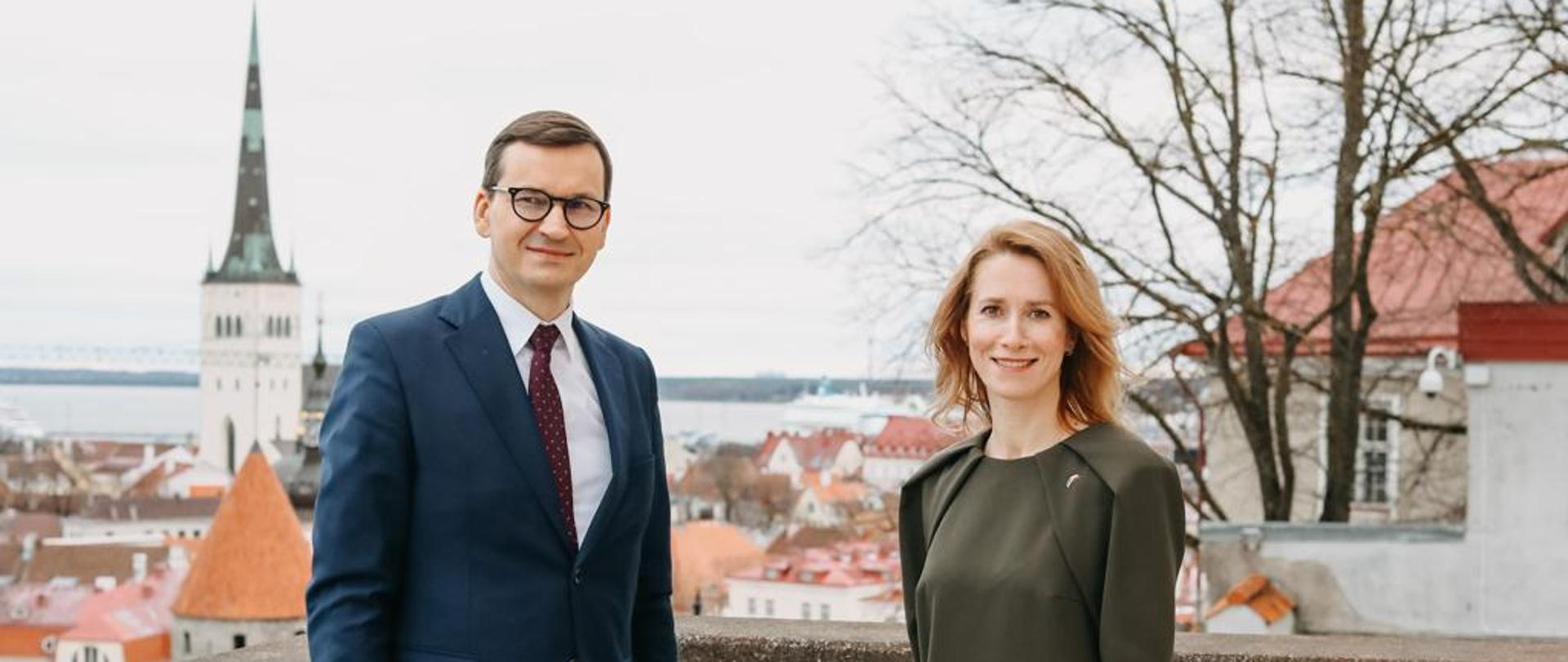
Prime Minister of Estonia Kaja Kallas met with the Prime Minister of Poland Mateusz Morawiecki in Tallinn, 2021

With both Estonia and Poland freed from Soviet oppression, two countries reestablished ties in 1991.

Since 1991, trades and cooperation between Estonia and Poland had increased dramatically, turning them into economic and political partnership. Estonia considers Poland as its priority on their relations.

Both Estonia and Poland are members of NATO and the European Union. Their relations have enjoyed a significant boost since 2000s. The threat from Russia, which increased under Vladimir Putin, has also prompted two countries to set closer tie together against a common foe.

April 12, 2010, was declared a day of national mourning in Estonia to commemorate the 96 victims of the Smolensk air disaster, including Polish President Lech Kaczyński and his wife Maria Kaczyńska.

There is a small dispute between Estonia and Poland over desynchronisation, which Poland was reluctant to establish the AC link to Estonia.

The Polish Air Force takes part in the NATO Baltic Air Policing mission to guard the airspace over the Baltic states including Estonia. In 2021, Prime Minister of Estonia Kaja Kallas named Poland a key ally of Estonia.

Poland and Estonia co-hosted the 2021 Men's European Volleyball Championship.

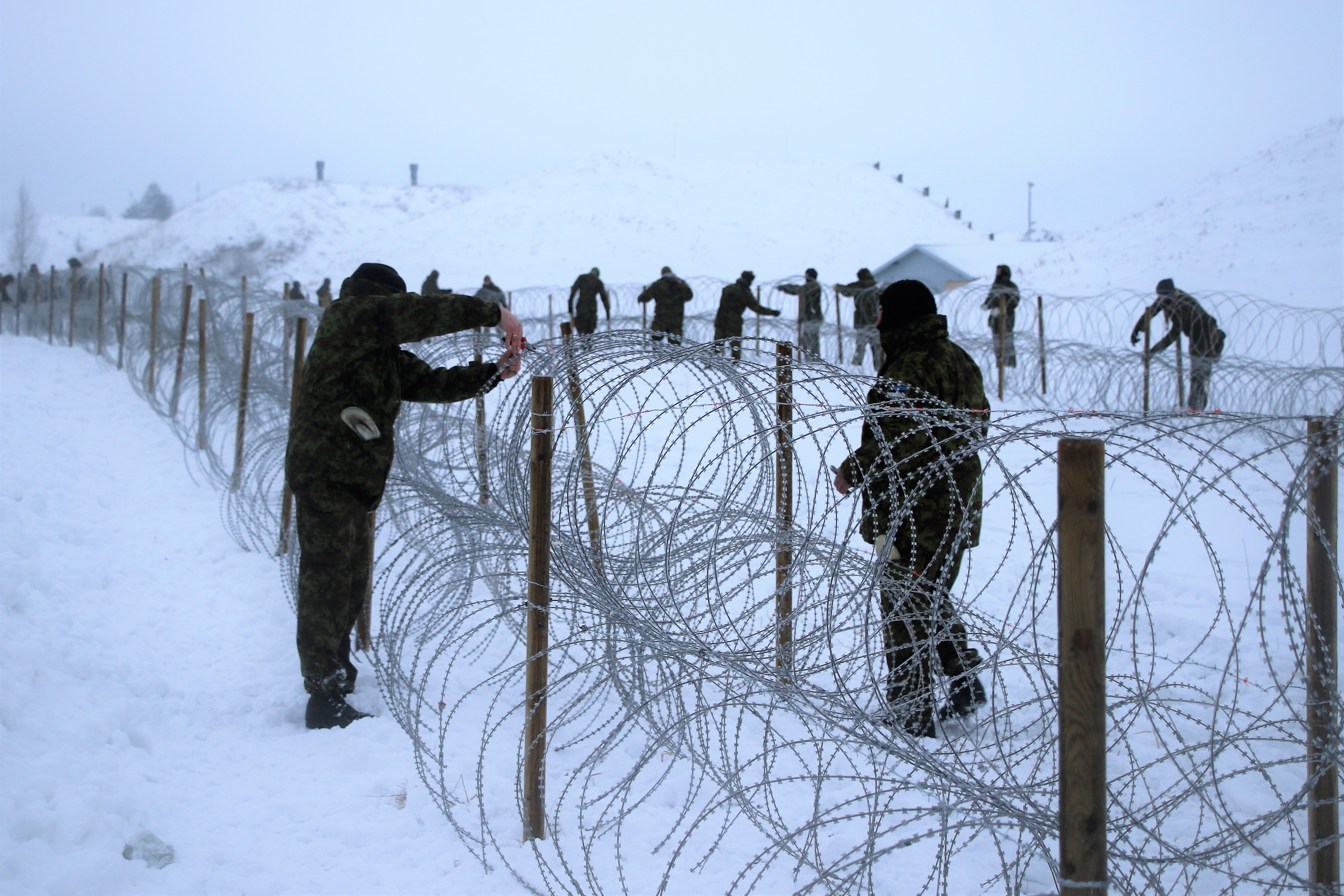
Members of the Wisent Task force 2 setting up barbed wire fences in Poland, along the Polish-Belarusian border

In November 2021, during the Belarus–European Union border crisis, Estonia decided to send 100 troops from the Estonian Defence Forces to help Poland.

From December 2021-April 2022, Estonian soldiers arrived in Poland and helped build bridges, barbed wire fences, reinforced roads, and other border barriers along the Polish-Belarusian border during the Wisent joint military exercise.

In 2022, Estonian and Polish gas grids were connected, following the commissioning of the GIPL interconnection, also providing Estonia with a connection to the EU gas market. The Rail Baltica and Via Baltica, modern rail and road links of vital importance, connecting Estonia with Poland and Central Europe, remain under construction (as of 2022).

Poland and Estonia played EURO 2024 play-off semi-final on March 21, 2024. Estonia's last gasp chance to make the UEFA European Championships football finals in Germany later this summer were decisively laid to rest in Warsaw as the Estonian team went down 5:1 at the Narodowy Stadium.

== NATO and the European Union ==
Poland joined NATO in 1999, whereas Estonia joined NATO in 2004. Poland supported Estonia's aspiration to join NATO, and ratified Estonia's accession in 2003. Both countries became members of the European Union in 2004.

== List of Estonian ambassadors to Poland and accredited to Romania and Bulgaria ==
- Miko Haljas (2024-present)
- Martin Roger (2018-2024)
- Harri Tiido (2014-2018)
- Eerik Marmei (2013-2014)
- Taavi Toom (2009-2014)
- Aivo Orav (2005-2009)

== List of Polish ambassadors to Estonia ==
- Grzegorz Kozłowski (2018-present)

== Resident diplomatic missions ==
- Estonia has an embassy in Warsaw.
- Poland has an embassy in Tallinn.
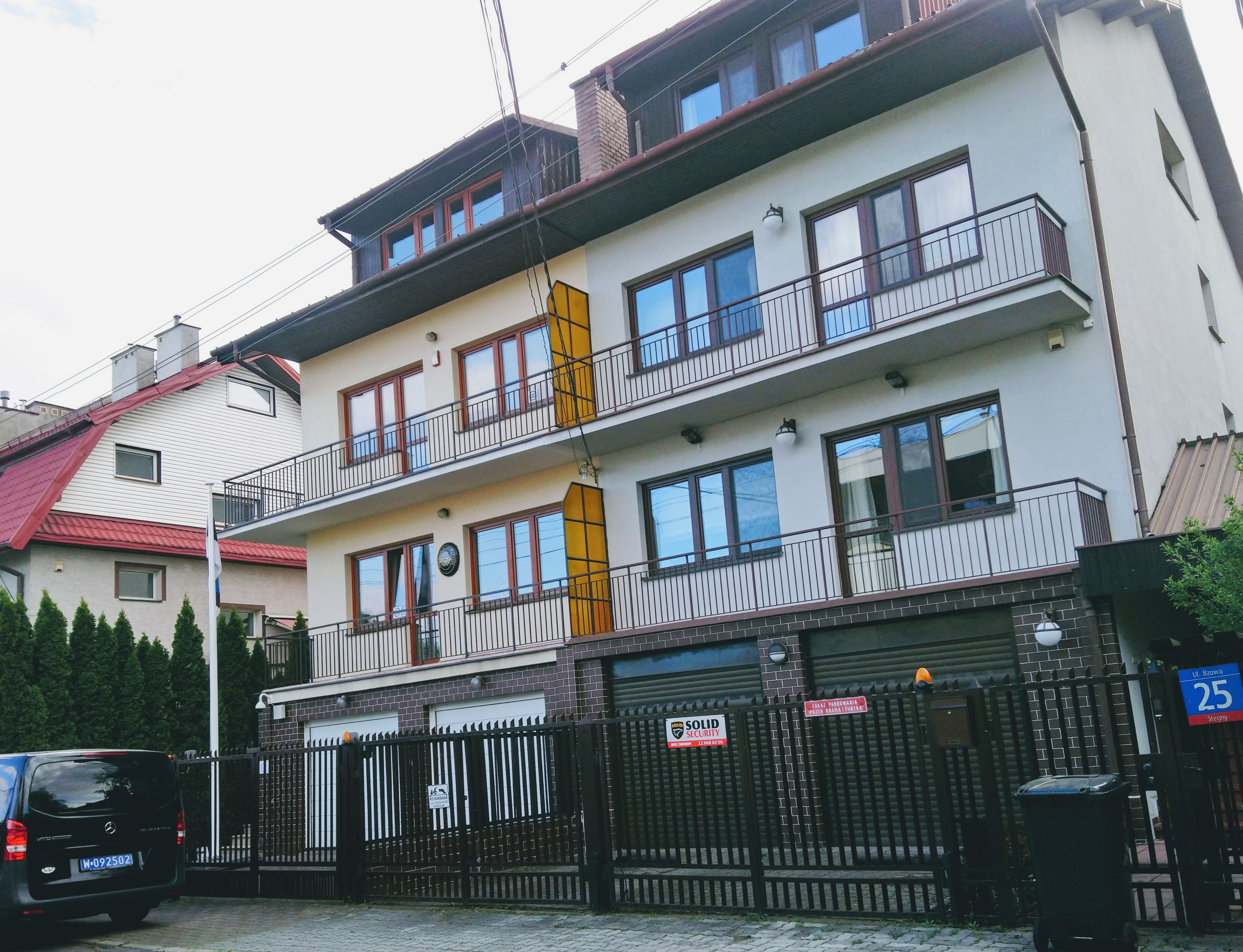
Embassy of Estonia in Warsaw

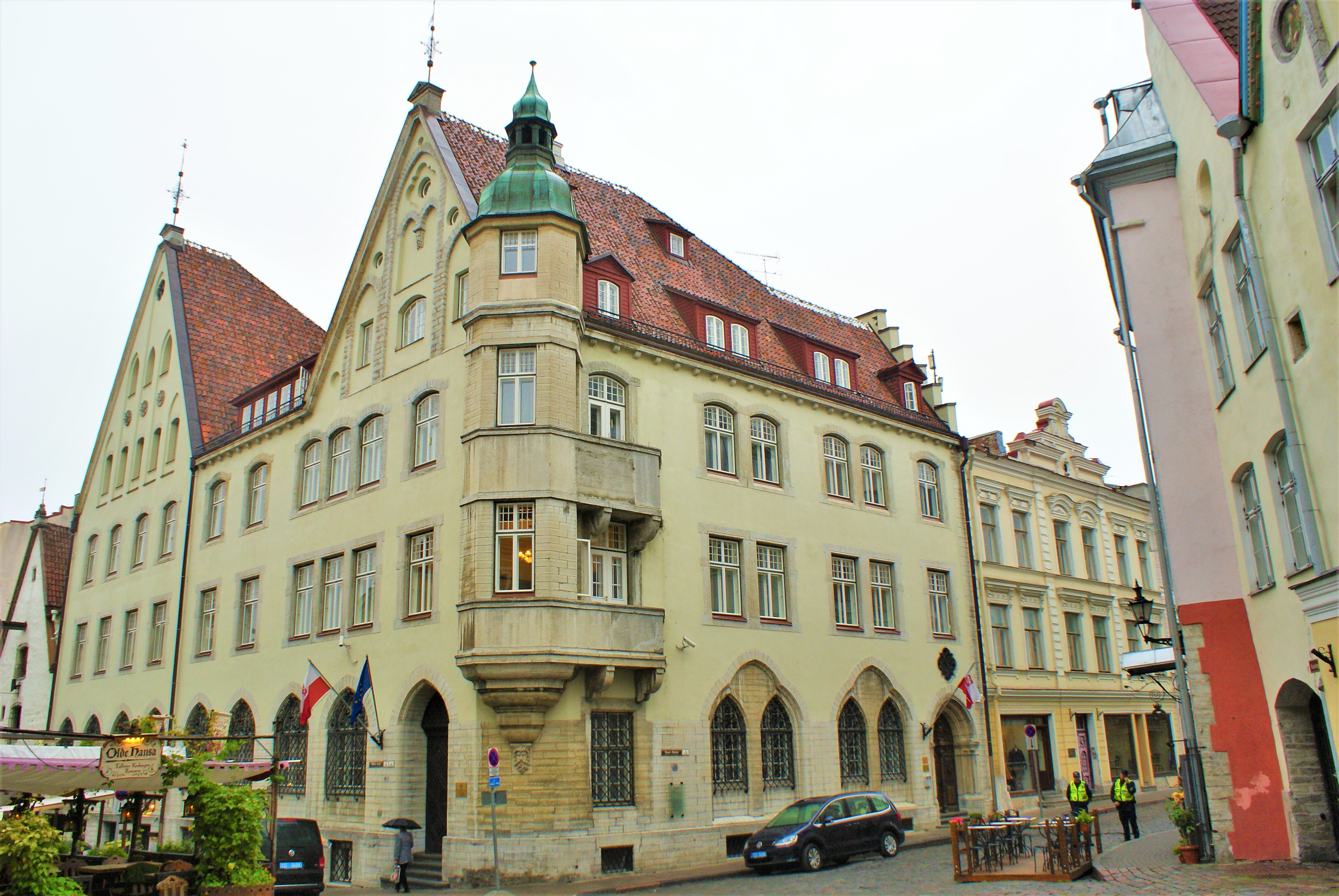
Embassy of Poland in Tallinn

== See also ==
- Foreign relations of Estonia
- Foreign relations of Poland
- Poles in Estonia
