= Estonian Afghanistan Contingent =

Joint military force

- Active: 2003-2014
- Country: Estonia
- Allegiance: International Security Assistance Force
- Branch: Estonian Defence Forces
- Type: battlegroup
- Size: 150
- Garrison/HQ: (Helmand province) Camp Bastion
- Nickname: Estcoy
- Motto: E Pluribus Unum / Respect
- Mascot: Polar Bear
- Engagements: War in Afghanistan: Helmand province campaign Operation Hammer; Operation Panther's Claw
- Decorations

Commanders
- Major: Janno Märk

The Estonian Afghanistan Contingent or (simply Afghanistan Contingent) was a joint military force of the Estonian Defence Forces deployed mainly in the southern region of Afghanistan, Helmand province in Now Zad area.

== Current deployments ==
This the order of battle of the known units that are operating within the Estonian Afghanistan Contingent:

- ESTCOY-14 infantry company
- NSE-13 logistical unit
- CPT diplomatic unit
- CST air-field unit
- Artillery battalion mortar unit

== History ==
Estonia has participated in Afghanistan since March 2003 under the NATO mission International Security Assistance Force (ISAF) in Afghanistan. The first Estonians to rotate in the country were an anti-landmine team in Kabul. In 2005 most of the Estonian units were relocated into northern Afghanistan in Mazar-e-Sharif province and in 2006 into the Helmand province in south Afghanistan.

=== Former deployments ===
This the order of battle of the known units that have operated within the Estonian Afghanistan Contingent:

- EODT-12 pioneer platoon
- EODT-11 pioneer platoon
- EODT-10 pioneer platoon
- EODT-9 pioneer platoon
- EODT-8 pioneer platoon
- EODT-7 pioneer platoon
- EODT-6 pioneer platoon
- EODT-5 pioneer platoon
- EODT-4 pioneer platoon
- EODT-3 pioneer platoon
- EODT-2 pioneer platoon
- EODT-1 pioneer platoon
- ESTCOY-17 infantry company: 11/2013-05/2014
- ESTCOY-16 infantry company: 05-11/2013
- ESTCOY-15 infantry company: 11/2012-05/2013
- ESTCOY-14 infantry company: May-Nov/2012
- ESTCOY-13 infantry company: 11/2011-5/2012
- ESTCOY-12 infantry company: 5-11/2011
- ESTCOY-11 infantry company: 11/2010-5/2011
- ESTCOY-10 infantry company: 5-11/2010
- ESTCOY-9 infantry company: 11/2009-5/2010
- ESTCOY-E infantry company: 7-11/2009
- ESTCOY-8 infantry company: 5-11/2009
- ESTCOY-7 infantry company: 11/2008-5/2009
- ESTCOY-6 infantry company: 5-11/2008
- ESTCOY-5 infantry company: 11/2007-5/2008
- ESTCOY-4 infantry company: 5-11/2007
- ESTCOY-3 infantry company: 11/2006-5/2007
- ESTCOY-2 infantry platoon: 6-11/2006
- NSE-6
- NSE-5
- NSE-4
- NSE-3
- NSE-2
- NSE-1

== See also ==
- Estonian Iraqi Contingent
- Estonian Kosovo Contingent
- International Security Assistance Force
- List of Estonian Contingencies
