= Estonian Iraqi Contingent =

Estonian military unit in Iraq

- Emblem of the Multi-National Force – Iraq
- Active: 2003–2009
- Country: Estonia
- Allegiance: Multi-National Force – Iraq
- Branch: Estonian Defence Forces
- Type: Platoon
- Engagements: Iraq War

The Estonian Iraqi Contingent was a joint military force of the Estonian Defence Forces as part of the Multi-National Force – Iraq during the Iraq War. Estonia, a member of the North Atlantic Treaty Organization (NATO), contributed troops via the contingent from June 2003 until its withdrawal in December 2008. The contingent was officially disbanded on 8 February 2009.

== History ==
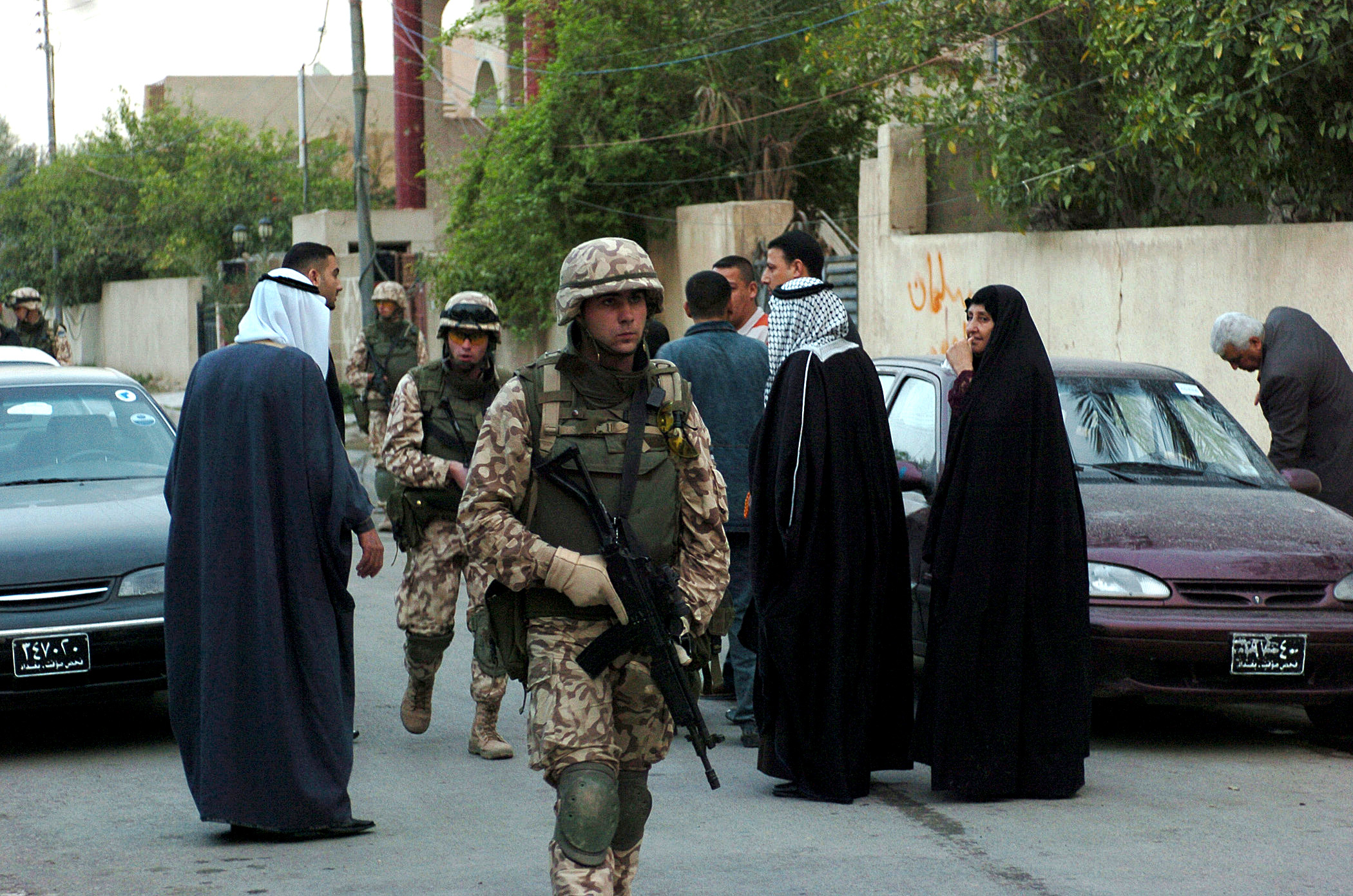
EIC soldiers in 2005

On 20 June 2003, a group of 43 Estonian servicemen were sent to Iraq as part of a six-month peace support operation. In the last half of 2004, the fourth replacement group of 32 service members was deployed. Three staff officers were also noted as serving in Iraq in April 2005. On 20 April 2005, the Riigikogu extended the mandate of service members through the end of 2005.

In September 2005, The Guardian reported that 40 Estonian servicemembers were stationed in Abu Ghraib in Baghdad Governorate. The Guardian reported that during this window of time, ten Estonian servicemembers had been wounded. Two servicemen were killed in 2004: Junior Sergeant Andres Nuiamäe and Senior Sergeant Arre Illenzeer, who died in separate incidents by detonated improvised explosive devices while on patrol. Despite withdrawals from other troops within the multi-national force and public opposition within Estonia, Prime Minister Andrus Ansip told a United States delegation of his desire for Estonian troops to stay after their mandate ends in December. The Riigikogu extended the mandate through 2006, and in June 2006 the Ministry of Defence reported that 38 Estonian servicemen were present near Baghdad.

=== Deactivation ===
On 17 December 2008, the Riigikogu again extended the mission through the end of 2009 in the event that Iraq requests the force's presence and a treaty on the legal status forces were signed, as a United Nations Security Council mandate defining the troops' status would expire before a new platoon would be deployed. Estonian Minister of Defence Jaak Aaviksoo announced on 14 January 2009 that Estonia was working on a treaty with Iraq and expected a deal to be signed within a few weeks. ESTPLA-18, the next group of troops to be deployed, was already formed and awaiting deployment once the legal situation was resolved.

On 22 January 2009, however, Aaviksoo announced that it would not deploy platoon ESTPLA-18 to replace the previous platoon of 34 troops. Aaviksoo cited the ambiquity of Estonian troops' legal status, the improving situation of the conflict, and a willingness from the Iraqi government to pursue bilateral cooperation outside of battle as reasons for the withdrawal. Estonia continued to partake in a NATO-led training mission, with three staff officers remaining in Iraq. A defence ministry spokesman said that Estonia wanted terms for their forces similar to those enjoyed by U.S. troops under the U.S. Status of Forces Agreement with Iraq, and was unable to come to an agreement with Iraqi officials.

The contingent was officially deactivated by Aaviksoo on 8 February 2009 and indicated that the platoon meant for deployment to Iraq may instead join the Estonian Afghanistan Contingent as part of its partnership with the International Security Assistance Force.

From the first infantry platoon, ESTPLA-7, to the last, ESTPLA-17, Estonia sent 11 total groups to Iraq, totaling over 400 troops. In the whole of the mission, two service members were killed and 18 were wounded.

== See also ==
- Estonia in NATO operations
- Multi-National Force – Iraq
