= Wisent (co-operative exercise) =

Series of joint military exercises between Estonia and Poland

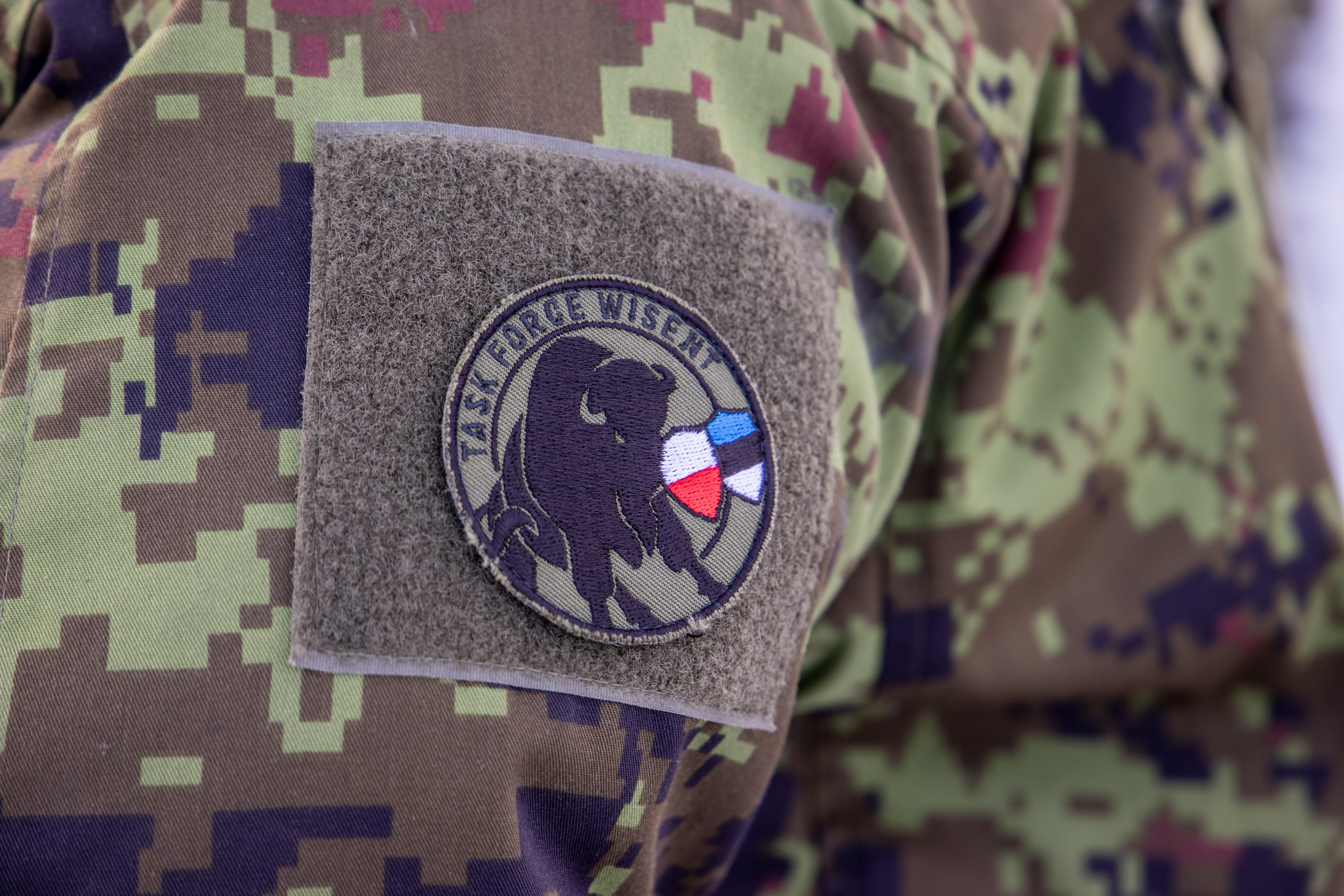
Wisent patch on an Estonian soldier during Wisent 2

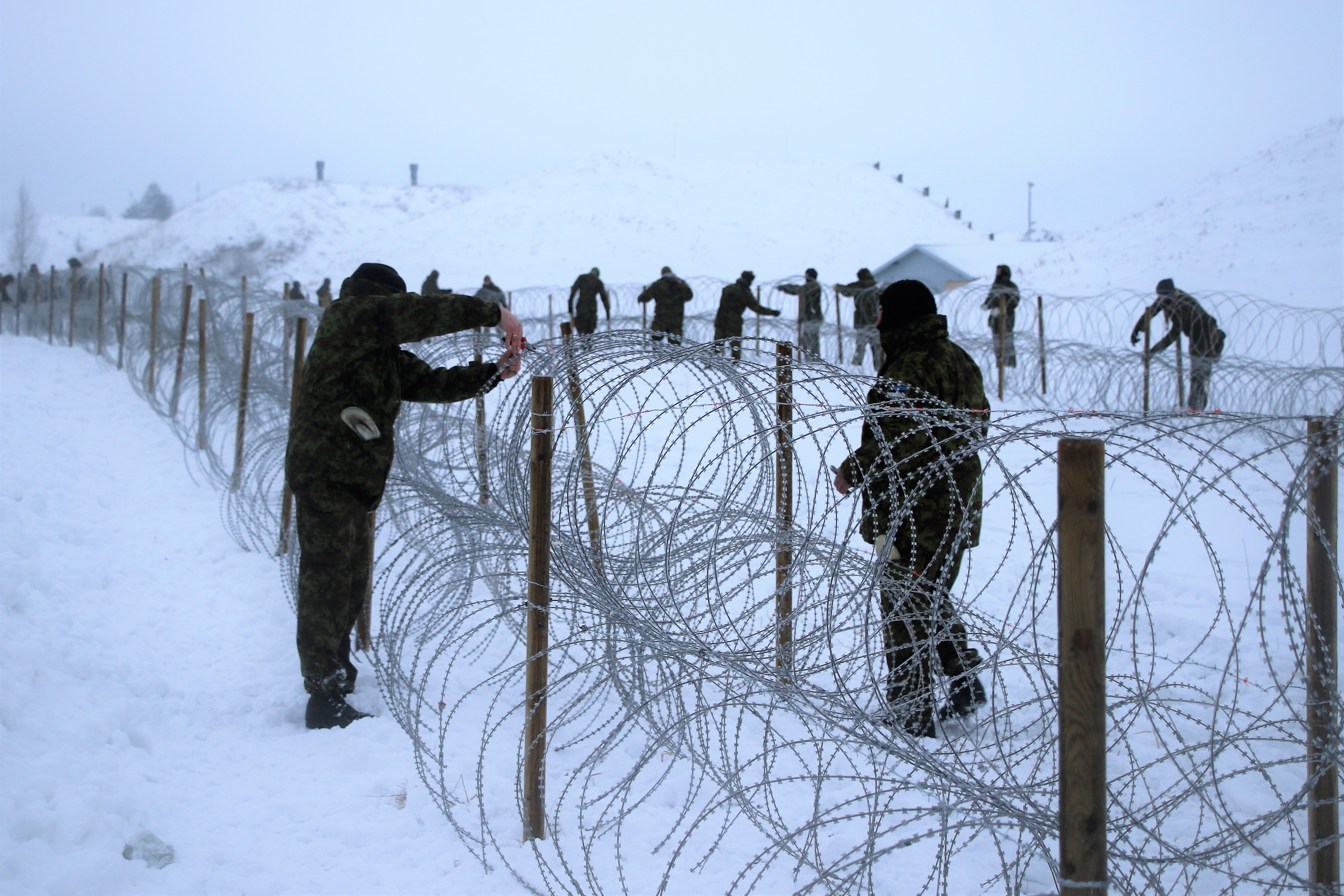
Members of the Wisent Task force 2 setting up barbed wire fences

Wisent was a 2021–22 series of joint military exercises between the Estonian Defence Forces and the Polish Armed Forces. The exercises included guarding, setting up barriers, and improving conditions on the Polish-Belarusian border. In total, there were five task forces.

== Etymology ==
"Wisent" is a name for the European bison.

== Task forces ==
The different operatives are called "Task Force #", such as Task Force Wisent 1, and ascend in numerals.

=== Task force 1 ===
In December 2021, Around forty Estonian soldiers arrived in the Lublin Voivodeship and, alongside Polish soldiers, helped clean up and set 22 km (13.6 mi) of border barriers along the Polish–Belarusian border in reaction to the Belarus-European Union Border Crisis. The unit involved troops from the Scouts Battalion, 2nd Infantry Brigade, 1st Infantry Brigade, reserve troops, and active-duty troops.

=== Task force 3 ===
In February 2022, Around sixty troops arrived in Poland and built 40 km of additional barriers along the Polish–Belarusian border and conducted observation flights to patrol the border due to the Russo-Ukrainian War.

=== Task force 4 ===
In March and April 2022, fifty Estonian and Polish troops strengthened ~5.5 km of border barriers and structures along the Polish–Belarusian border, built culverts, and improved conditions along the border. The mobilization ended deployment with a memorial service for the Katyn massacre. During the memorial service, the mayor of Włodawa, Wiesław Muszyński, said, "It is very important not to forget the Katyn massacre and other war crimes, who would have believed that 82 years later, mass murders would still be committed in our neighboring country? Estonians remember with us and as proof of that, you are here today, and I thank you deeply for that."

Lieutenant Colonel Andres Rekker, the commander of the Estonian task force, also allegedly said, "We stand here to commemorate the Polish soldiers who were savagely killed by the Red Army in Katyn in 1940. The Russians did not acknowledge this war crime for over half a century, just as they do not acknowledge the war crimes committed in Ukraine now, but truth always triumphs over lies."

=== Task force 5 ===
In April 2022, seventy Estonian troops, alongside the 18th Mechanized Division of Poland, built four bridges, reinforced the border, built additional barriers, reinforced roads along the border, and made foot and ATV patrols possible. On 27 April, Estonian Minister of Defense, Kalle Laanet, met with the Estonian troops and thanked them for their cooperation with the Polish troops on the Polish border. Laanet said, "It helps strengthen defense cooperation between Estonia and Poland, the importance of which cannot be underestimated in the current security situation. Estonian defense personnel have also increased Estonia's renown and visibility among regular Polish people. Thank you for making Estonia bigger and Europe safer!"

== See also ==
- Estonia in NATO operations
- Estonia–Poland relations
- NATO Enhanced Forward Presence
