= North Kosovo crisis (2022–2026) =

Tensions between Kosovo and Serbia

Date	31 July 2022 – Present
Location	North Kosovo and Merdare border crossing; spillover into Central Serbia
Status	Ongoing Full results: Kosovo Serbs withdraw from institutions; erection of barricades (Dec 2022); Northern Kosovo clashes (May 2023); Banjska attack (Sep 2023); Integration of license plates to RKS (Jan 2024); Abolition of Serbian dinar and closure of Serbian parallel institutions (2024); Return of Serb mayors and Serbian political control over Serb-majority municipalities in North Kosovo (Oct–Dec 2025); Kosovo Police raids in Banovë and Prevlak; seizure of weapons and ammunition (Apr 2026); NATO announces "calibrated reductions" in Kosovo Force (KFOR) troop numbers (Jun 2026); KFOR begins gradual transition of security responsibility for the main Ibar River bridge in Mitrovica to the Kosovo Police (Aug 2026)

Belligerents
Kosovo Serbs; Supported by: Serbia	Kosovo	NATO; European Union

Commanders and leaders
Milan Radoičić (WIA); Goran Rakić; Igor Simić; Supported by: (Serbia) Aleksandar Vučić (Serbia) Petar Petković	(Kosovo) Vjosa Osmani (Kosovo) Albin Kurti (Kosovo) Xhelal Sveçla Gazmend Hoxha; Veton Elshani; Afrim Bunjaku †	Roberto Vergori (2026–present); Özkan Ulutaş (2025–2026); Enrico Barduani (2024–2025); Angelo Michele Ristuccia (2022–23); Giovanni Pietro Barbano (EULEX)

Units involved
Paramilitary groups: Civilna Zaštita; Northern Brigade; Serbian state agencies: BIA; VOA; Political party Serb List	Kosovo Police; Special Intervention Unit (SIU); Kosovo Intelligence Agency	Kosovo Force (KFOR); EULEX

Casualties and losses
North Kosovo Paramilitary Groups: 3 killed (Banjska); 6+ wounded; 8 captured; Protesters/Civilians: 55+ injured; 21+ arrested; 1 former KP police arrested; (Serbia) Serbian State Agencies: 2 MUP arrested (deported); 2 BIA agents arrested; 1 VOA agent arrested	Kosovo Police: 1 killed (Afrim Bunjaku); 24 wounded (8 non-combat); 3 captured by Serbia (released); 1 former officer arrested by Serbia	Kosovo Force: 93 wounded (May 2023)

The North Kosovo Crisis is an ongoing crisis that began on 31 July 2022, tensions between Kosovo and Serbia heightened due to the expiration of the eleven-year validity period of documents for cars on 1 August 2022, between the government of Kosovo and the Serbs in North Kosovo. Kosovo, which declared independence in 2008, signed an agreement with Serbia in 2011 that determined the use of license plates in North Kosovo. This agreement was supposed to change license plates from the ones that were issued by Serbia to neutral ones. The agreement for the change was extended in 2016 and expired in 2021, which led to a crisis in 2021 that ended with an agreement to terminate the ban of Kosovo-issued license plates in Serbia.

After a Kosovo announcement that Serbian citizens who enter Kosovo will receive entry and exit documents, a number of barricades were created in North Kosovo on 31 July 2022 but were removed two days later after Kosovo announced that it would postpone the ban on license plates issued by Serbia. In August 2022, unsuccessful negotiations regarding license plates were held, although the ID document dispute was solved. A proposed agreement, dubbed the "German-French proposal" by the media, would be the basis of consultations beginning in January 2023.

Albin Kurti declined to postpone the deadline for license plates and instead announced a phased implementation that would run from November 2022 until April 2023. Before this began, a number of Kosovo Serb police officers, mayors, judges, and Serb List members of parliament resigned from government institutions. Kosovo and Serbia negotiated again in November 2022 and they had found an agreement on 23 November 2022 which settled that license plates that Serbia issued would continue to be in use in North Kosovo.

Kosovo formally signed an application to seek candidate status for European Union membership on 14 December 2022, its impending signature resulted in a number of barricades being set up in North Kosovo on 10 December; they were dismantled on 30 December. In Serbia, far-right groups staged protests in support of Kosovo Serbs. In December 2022, Serbia submitted a request to Kosovo Force for the deployment of up to 1,000 Serbian military and police forces in Kosovo, which ended up being rejected in January 2023.

In April local elections were held, boycotted by ethnic Serbs. Based on an extremely low number of votes, ethnic Albanian mayors were elected. On 26 May 2023, Kosovo took control of the North Kosovo municipal buildings by force, to enable the newly elected ethnic Albanian mayors to physically assume office. A civil disturbance occurred, and Serbia put its armed forces on alert. The decision of Kosovo to use force was condemned by the United States and the EU. With mayors unable to perform their duties, in July Kosovo announced that new mayor elections will be held.

On 1 January 2024, Serbia implemented the 2011 agreement and recognised Kosovo license plates.

== Background ==
In 1991, Kosovo Albanians proclaimed the establishment of the Republic of Kosova, with Albania only recognizing it as an independent state. The aftermath of the Kosovo War led to the United Nations establishing a governance in Kosovo and NATO establishing the Kosovo Force (KFOR). Kosovo then proclaimed independence from Serbia in 2008; Serbia did not recognize its independence. North Kosovo, a majority Serb region in Kosovo, is also largely opposed to independent Kosovo and prior to the 2013 Brussels Agreement it refused to acknowledge and recognize its independence; in a 2012 referendum, 99% of voters in North Kosovo, with a 75% turnout, rejected the institutions of Kosovo, although the referendum was rejected by Serbia and Kosovo. 2013 Brussels Agreement established a modus vivendi between Serbia and Kosovo. Community of Serb Municipalities was to be formed by 2016, although the government of Kosovo froze the deal in 2015, with the Constitutional Court of Kosovo declaring it as unconstitutional.

An agreement between Serbia and Kosovo was concluded on the use of license plates in 2011. Up to that point, Serbia issued Serbian license plates for North Kosovo, although after the agreement the license plates were changed to neutral ones. This agreement was extended in 2016 and was valid until September 2021. After the expiration of the agreement, a crisis occurred and it lasted until October 2021 when another agreement was reached, which effectively ended the ban of Kosovar license plates in Serbia. This agreement was initially intended to be temporary, although in April 2022, the agreement was extended for a further period.

== Timeline ==
=== 2022 ===
==== July ====
A number of Kosovo Serb civilians in North Kosovo began forming barricades on 31 July after the announcement that citizens of Serbia who enter Kosovo will receive documents for entry and exit. This led to KFOR sending troops to patrol the streets, while the Kosovo Police ended up closing the border crossings at Jarinje and Brnjak. Nikola Selaković, then-minister of foreign affairs of Serbia, claimed that Albin Kurti, the prime minister of Kosovo, was "preparing hell in the coming days" for Serbs who live in Kosovo. It was also reported that air raid sirens were turned on in Zubin Potok and North Mitrovica. Roads were blocked near Jarinje and Brnjak border crossings.

Later that day, the ministry of defence of Serbia stated that "the Serbian Army did not cross the border into Kosovo", amid reports that it did enter Kosovo. Aleksandar Vučić, the president of Serbia, also stated that he would want the ban to be postponed. He added that "if they don't want to keep the peace, Serbia will win"; Kurti accused Vučić and Petar Petković, the director of the office for Kosovo and Metohija, for being responsible for the unrest. According to the government of Serbia, one Serb was wounded at the Jarinje border crossing, although the government of Kosovo denied that and stated that only some shooting occurred. Additionally, one gunman also fired on the Kosovo Police.

==== August ====
After negotiations with the diplomatic representatives of the United States and the European Union, the government of Kosovo announced on 1 August that it would temporarily postpone the ban on license plates that were issued by Serbia, after stating the decision a day prior. This agreement was welcomed by Josep Borrell, the high representative of the Union for Foreign Affairs and Security Policy, and Miroslav Lajčák, the European Union Special Representative for the Belgrade-Pristina dialogue. On the same day, Balkan Insight reported that social media users spread disinformation about a "full-scale war". A day later, KFOR confirmed that the barricades that were put up on 31 July were removed, after which the border crossing was opened again for use.

The Kosovo Police reported that one of their patrols was attacked with fire on 6 August near the border. Opposition political parties in Kosovo accused Kurti of "scaring investors about a possible new conflict with Serbia"; Kurti denied the accusations and instead blamed Russia and Vladimir Putin, accusing them of spreading disinformation. At a joint news conference and negotiations with Kurti and Vučić, Jens Stoltenberg, the secretary general of NATO, stated that "NATO urges restraint but stands ready to intervene if needed". A day later, Borrell met with Kurti and Vučić; Borrell stated that the meeting ended without an agreement, but that the talks would also resume in the following days. On 19 August, NATO deployed further KFOR forces in North Kosovo for peacekeeping purposes. Additionally, Vučić stated that KFOR forces should "do their job" and vowed to "defend Kosovo Serbs if NATO failed to do so".

Borrell announced that the ID document dispute was settled on 27 August. It was announced that Serbia agreed to abolish entry and exit documents for Kosovo ID holders while Kosovo committed to refrain from implementing such measures for Serbian ID holders. Vučić stated that he was "very happy that we found a solution", while Igor Simić, the vice president of the Serb List, stated that "this was the victory of Serbian diplomacy". Kurti also praised the agreement, but received criticism from opposition parties in Kosovo due to allegedly continuing the policy of his opponent Hashim Thaçi. Political parties in Serbia, such as the People's Party (Narodna) and Dveri, criticized the agreement.

==== September ====
The agreement, which was signed on 27 August, started being implemented on 1 September. Ana Brnabić, the prime minister of Serbia, visited North Mitrovica on 5 September where she met with representatives of the Serb List. During her speech, she stated that she would be willing to "compromise in the interest of peace and stability". On the same day, Emmanuel Macron, the president of France, and Olaf Scholz, the chancellor of Germany, urged Vučić and Kurti to "move past differences at a moment of crucial importance for security". In a speech to the National Assembly of Serbia on 13 September, Vučić stated that "a realistic solution should be offered for Kosovo, but Serbia will not recognize its independence".

A proposed agreement that was sent by Lajčák, Jens Plötner and Emmanuel Bonne, associates of Scholz and Macron respectively, was leaked on 19 September. A day later, NATO announced that it would send more KFOR forces in case of new tensions. The ministry of internal affairs of Kosovo confirmed on 21 September that cars with license plates that were issued by Serbia will be considered to be unregistered after 1 November.

==== October ====
In early October, Kosovo and Serbia confirmed the existence of the proposed agreement. Vučić stated that according to the proposed agreement, Kosovo would receive membership in the United Nations, while Serbia in exchange would receive a sped up accession to the European Union. Radio Free Europe disputed this claim and instead claimed that the agreement includes "development of good relations on the basis of equal rights, recognition of national symbols, special arrangement for the Serb community and the Serbian Orthodox Church in Kosovo, deepening cooperation at all levels, an agreement on all prior agreements and that Serbia will not oppose Kosovo's membership in any international organization". Osmani stated that the proposed agreement is "a good basis for talks" but that "we never said that the document as such without any changes can be acceptable for Kosovo". The media has dubbed the agreement as "German-French proposal".

Gabriel Escobar, the U.S. State Department special envoy for the Balkans, stated on 20 October that Kosovo should postpone the deadline. Goran Rakić, the leader of the Serb List, met with Vučić on 27 October. During a press conference, Rakić stated that "if Kosovo starts enforcing the confiscation of vehicles and license plates, we will use all means against it" but assured that "all democratic and peaceful means" would be only used. Kurti declined to postpone the deadline, although on 28 October he announced a phased implementation of the change of license plates up to 21 April. He also added that cars with license plates that were issued by Serbia will be "reprimanded, then fined, and then forced to attach probationary plates to their cars".

==== November ====
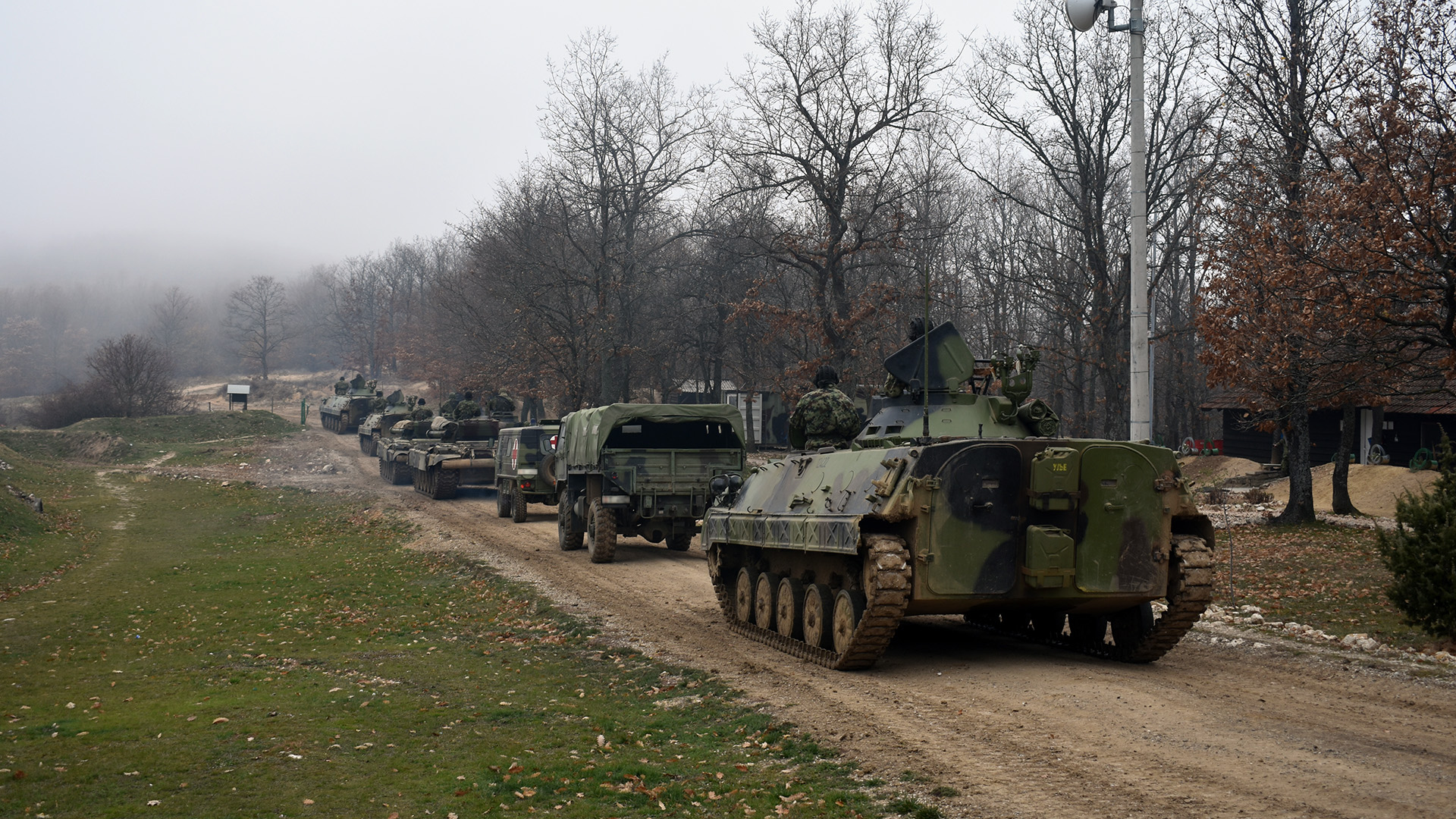
A Serbian Army base located near the Kosovo border

The phased implementation began on 1 November. A day later, Nenad Đurić, the director of the Regional Police Directorate for North Kosovo, stated that the police in North Kosovo would not implement the decision on the re-registration of license plates that were issued by Serbia to the ones that are issued by Kosovo. On 5 November, hundreds of Kosovo Serb police officers, mayors, judges, and Serb List members of parliament withdrew from government institutions in protest. In response, Kurti, Borrell, and Christopher R. Hill, the United States ambassador to Serbia, stated that "withdrawing is not the answer to the crisis", while Vučić accused Kurti of ignoring the Brussels Agreement; Kurti stated three days prior that the Community of Serb Municipalities does not exist. On 6 November, a protest that was organized by the Serb List was held in North Mitrovica. Mass resignations of Kosovo Serbs continued to take place after the resignations on 5 November, after which Kurti accused Serbia of "trying to destabilize Kosovo". As a response, NATO deployed more KFOR peacekeeping troops.

Ivica Dačić, now-minister of foreign affairs of Serbia, stated on 6 November that the proposed agreement is "unacceptable" and claimed that the agreement "starts from the position that Kosovo is independent". Kurti and Vučić met with Macron and Borrell in France on 11 November where they discussed about the crisis. Borrell said that Kurti and Vučić did not reject the proposed agreement and that Kosovo Serbs should return to the government institutions, while he also urged Kurti to form the Community of Serb Municipalities. Vučić also accused Germany and United Kingdom of allegedly backing Kurti. Following the meeting, Osmani announced that local elections will be held in four municipalities in North Kosovo in December 2022; the election was later postponed to April 2023. Kurti and Vučić met again with Lajčák and Borrell to discuss about the implementation of license plates on 21 November. They failed to reach an agreement, although Kurti soon after announced that he had accepted the proposal from the United States to postpone the application of the measure to punish car owners who have not changed license plates that were issued by Serbia for two days. A day later, another series of talks were held during which an agreement between Kosovo and Serbia was reached. Borrell stated that Kosovo and Serbia would now "concentrate on normalizing their relations", while Petković, who was one of the negotiators, stated that license plates that were issued by Serbia would continue to be in use in North Kosovo. On the same day, two anti-government protests were held in North Mitrovica and Gračanica.

Amidst the crisis, the ministry of defence of Serbia claimed that "several drones have entered Serbian airspace from Kosovo over past three days" on 2 November. Vučić ordered to "eliminate" any drones that enter the Serbian airspace and placed the Serbian Army on "high alert". The ministry of defence of Serbia also claimed that a "commercial drone" was destroyed near army barracks in Raška, although Armend Mehaj, the minister of defence of Kosovo, denied that any drones from Kosovo entered the Serbian airspace.

==== December ====
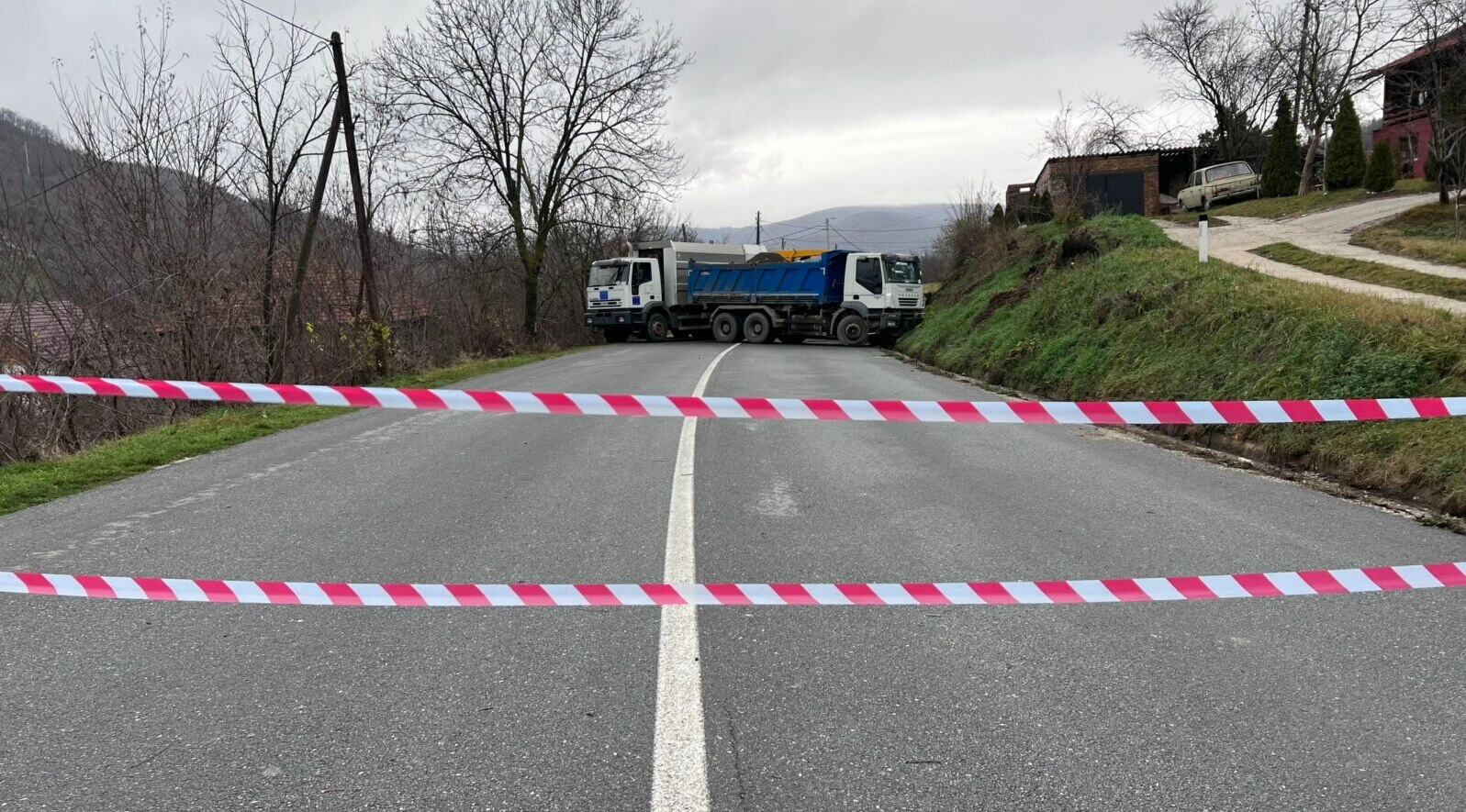
A barricade in North Kosovo on 12 December 2022

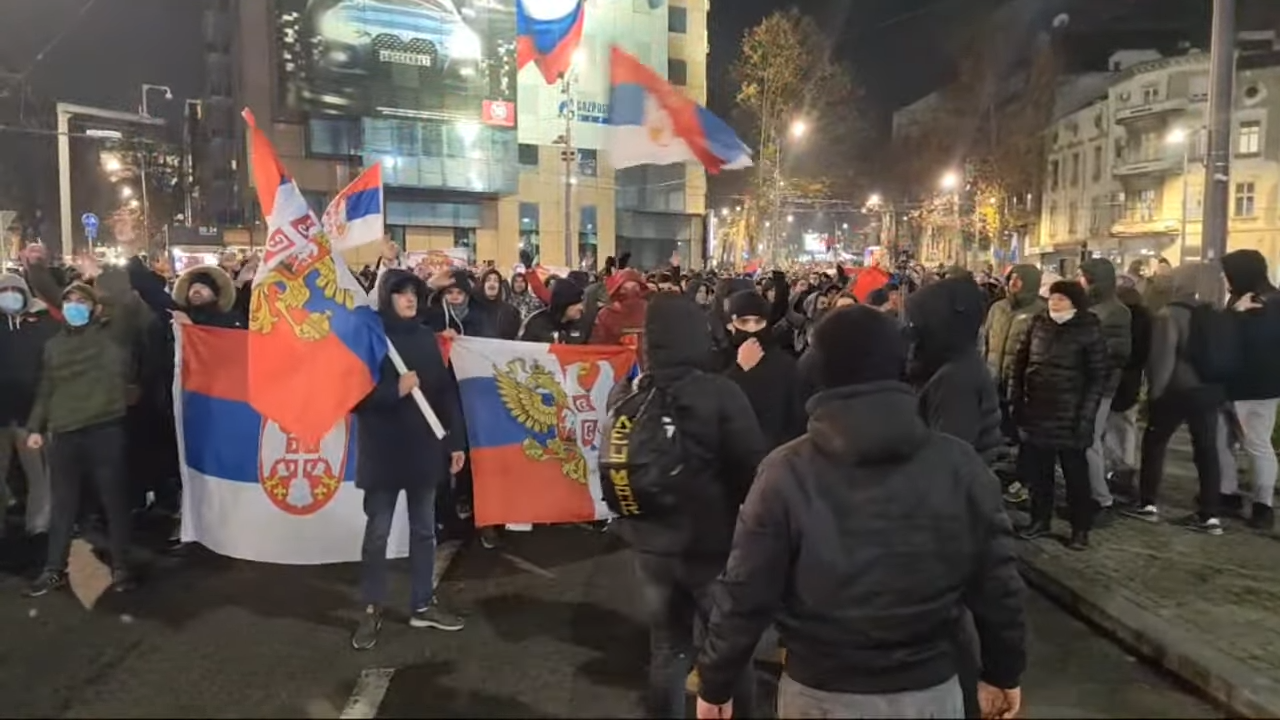
A protest was held in Belgrade on 12 December 2022 in support of Kosovo Serbs

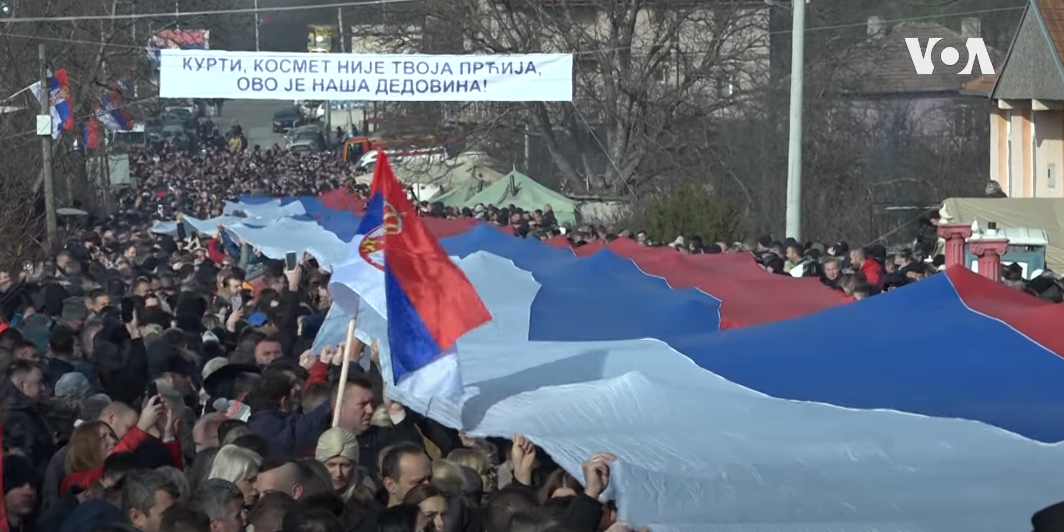
Kosovo Serbs held an anti-government protest near Zvečan on 22 December 2022

Kurti appointed Nenad Rašić as the minister of communities and returns on 1 December, a position which was held by Rakić until his resignation on 5 November. Serb List claimed that his appointment was "unconstitutional", while Vučić called Rašić the "worst Serbian scum" during a press conference. During the EU-Western Balkans summit in Tirana on 6 December, Vučić and Osmani received an updated version of the proposed agreement. Additionally, Osmani officially announced that Kosovo would apply to join the European Union in December 2022; Kosovo formally signed an application to seek the candidate status for European Union membership on 14 December, with Vučić claiming that Kosovo violated the Washington Agreement by signing the application.

On 8 December, Petković stated that Serbia would consider deploying 1,000 Serbian military forces to Kosovo, citing content of the Article 4 and Annex 2, Article 6 of the United Nations Security Council Resolution 1244, due to claims that the Regional Operational Support Unit (ROSU) allegedly raided North Mitrovica. The government of Kosovo denied that ROSU entered North Mitrovica, stating that "it was the police, and not some other unit". On the same day, Kosovo Police reported that a group of armed people attacked one of their police officers. A day later, Brnabić agreed with Petković and accused KFOR of "failing to protect Serbs" from an alleged harassment of Kosovo Serbs. Osmani described the consideration as "an act of aggression". On 10 December, Vučić stated that he will send a request to KFOR in order to deploy military and police forces in Kosovo, although he also added that he "knows that this request will be rejected". Escobar stated on 13 December that "the United States is against Serbia sending military forces to Kosovo". Serbia sent a request to KFOR for the deployment of 1,000 Serbian military and police forces on 16 December. A number of barricades began forming after an arrest of Dejan Pantić, a former police officer of Serb ethnicity, on the same day. It was reported that the barricades were seen at Leposavić and Zvečan and that air raid sirens were also turned on. Kosovo Police then announced that border crossings at Jarinje and Brnjak would be closed. Xhelal Sveçla, the minister of internal affairs of Kosovo, stated that Pantić was one of the suspects who attacked police officers in the days preceding the formation of the barricades; Pantić was sentenced to a house arrest on 28 December. A day later, a stun grenade was thrown at a car that belonged to the European Union Rule of Law Mission in Kosovo (EULEX), although there were no reported injuries. Borrell and NATO condemned the attack, with Borrell also stating that the barricades should be removed. On the same day, Kurti asked KFOR to guarantee "freedom of movement" after accusing demonstrators of blocking the roads, while Vučić vowed to "maintain peace". The protests remained peaceful while schools in North Kosovo were temporarily closed.

An ultranationalist protest in support of Kosovo Serbs was held in Belgrade on 12 December; demonstrators chanted slogans such as "Kosovo is Serbia" and burned Kosovo flags. The protest was attended by far-right groups such as Dveri, People's Patrol, and Serbian Right. On the same day, Borrell announced that the European Union would reinforce EULEX, which is tasked with patrolling North Kosovo. After a meeting with Kurti on 13 December, Lajčák said that the "barricades should be removed with a political agreement, rather than with bulldozers", while Escobar said that he expects an agreement regarding the Community of Serb Municipalities. People's Patrol and other far-right groups staged another protest on 18 December, although this time at the Jarinje border crossing. The demonstrators were stopped by KFOR after they tried to go through the border crossing. Kosovo Serbs organized a mass protest near Zvečan on 22 December. At the protest, Rakić demanded the government to "release all arrested Serbs and to withdraw the Kosovo Police from North Kosovo". A shooting occurred on 25 December at Zubin Potok after Kosovo Police allegedly attempted to remove barricades from a nearby road; Kosovo Police denied this, however KFOR confirmed that some shooting did occur near their patrols. Shortly after, more barricades were formed near North Mitrovica and the Merdare border crossing, while Miloš Vučević, the minister of defence of Serbia, announced that the Serbian Army was put up "on the highest level of alert", with the order coming from Vučić. Due to the barricades, the government of Kosovo closed the Merdare border crossing on 28 December. A day later, Kosovo Serbs agreed to start dismantling the barricades after an agreement that was reached a day prior; they were removed by 30 December. Caroline Ziadeh, the head of UNMIK, welcomed this decision, while the "increased combat readiness" of the Serbian Army was also abolished. Border crossings were also re-opened.

=== 2023 ===
==== January ====
On 8 January, it was announced that KFOR declined Serbia's request to deploy up to 1,000 Serbian military and police forces in Kosovo. Kurti and Osmani met with Derek Chollet, the counselor of the United States Department of State, on 11 January, and two days later, Chollet met with Vučić. Chollet stated that "Serbia and Kosovo should normalize relations" and that "in the end, Serbia will have to recognize some of Kosovo's sovereignty", while "Kosovo should give ethnic Serbs more autonomy". After consultations on 20 January, Lajčák, Escobar, Plötner, Bonne, and Francesco Talo, the diplomatic advisor to prime minister of Italy Giorgia Meloni, expressed their support for the "French-German proposal", while Lajčák commented that the "formation of the Community of Serb Municipalities is crucial". On 23 January, the Kosovo Police shot at a car on the Mitrovica-Leposavić highway, wounding one Serb; Kosovo Police claimed that the car previously "hit a police car, putting the life of a police officer in direct danger".

==== February ====
After negotiations with Lajčák on 6 February, Kurti announced that he would accept the French-German proposal, stating that "it would be a good basis for further negotiations". Additionally, Kurti stated that "the formation of the Community of Serb Municipalities will be only possible after mutual recognition from Serbia". On 27 February 2023, an agreement was verbally accepted by Kosovar prime minister Albin Kurti and Serbian president Aleksandar Vučić which would lead towards a signed agreement.

==== March ====
A plan, the Ohrid Agreement, setting out a plan to advance towards normalization was agreed on 18 March 2023.

==== April ====
On 10 April, a Serb civilian was shot and wounded while driving near a Kosovo Police checkpoint. The police initially denied the shooting had occurred, but hours later, four officers were arrested and remanded in custody for 48 hours—one for opening fire and three for not reporting the incident. In protest of recent events, the Serb population of North Kosovo boycotted the local elections of 23 April 2023, which were originally supposed to take place the previous December but were postponed. Kosovar election officials set up shipping containers next to roads and used them as makeshift polling stations guarded by heavily armed members of the Kosovo Police. Of 45,000 eligible voters, only 1,567 ballots were cast, representing a turnout of 3.47 per cent—the lowest in Kosovo's history. Despite the low turnout, U.S. officials announced they would recognize the results. As a result of the boycott, three ethnic Albanians and one Bosnian Muslim were elected as mayors. The Vetëvendosje party of Kosovo's prime minister Albin Kurti won the mayoral races in North Mitrovica and Leposavić, while candidates from the opposition Democratic Party of Kosovo were declared the winners in Zvečan and Zubin Potok.

==== May ====
On 26 May 2023, Kosovo police took control of the municipal buildings in Zvečan, Zubin Potok and Leposavić to allow the newly elected mayors – with whom ethnic Serbs had refused to cooperate – to assume office. A week earlier, in North Mitrovica, the transition was handled peacefully. Protesters had gathered in front of the municipal buildings. A civil disturbance took place in Zvečan, during which the protesters unsuccessfully tried to stop the police from escorting the mayor inside. Ten protesters were treated for light injuries and tear gas inhalation, while five police officers received minor injuries. The flag of Serbia was removed from all four municipal buildings and replaced with the flag of Kosovo. Serbia declared that its armed forces have raised the level of combat readiness and have been moved closer to the border. Kosovar authorities' use of force to protect the mayors was condemned by the United States and the EU.

On 29 May 2023, clashes erupted in northern Kosovo leading to injuries to 25 KFOR peacekeepers from Hungary and Italy. Up to 50 ethnic Serb protestors were also injured. In the aftermath of the clashes, the office of Serbian president Aleksandar Vucic put out a statement which placed the Serbian Armed Forces on "highest level alert" in response to the violence.

==== June ====
On 13 June, Kosovo police entered Zvečan and arrested local Serb leader Milun Milenković – accusing him of organizing Serb protests – leading to riots which left three police officers injured. The next day, Serbian police arrested three Kosovo police officers, claiming that they crossed into Central Serbia, Kosovo denied the allegation, instead accusing Serbian police of entering Kosovo and kidnapping the officers. As a result, Kosovo announced a ban on the entry of vehicles with Serbian license plates and goods. Despite the ban, it was reported that Serbian vehicles were still being allowed to enter after going through tightened border controls, something which Kurti himself acknowledged in a press conference on 15 June. On 26 June, Serbia released the three police officers and let them back into Kosovo.

On 16 June, during a protest in Leposavić, Serb protesters attacked a Kosovar TV crew, with both a journalist and cameraman being raped and the cameraman's camera being smashed.

On 28 June, the police station of North Mitrovica was attacked by hand grenades in the early hours of the morning. No casualties were reported but two police cars were damaged in the blasts.

On 29 June, Kosovo declared two Serb groups – Northern Brigade and Civil Defense – terrorist organizations, although the Serb List denied the existence of either. The United States and the EU condemned the unilateral nature of Kosovo's decision.

==== July ====
On 11 July, Kosovo announced a one-quarter reduction of special police forces in front of the Northern municipal buildings, as well as new mayoral elections in North Kosovo.

On 31 July, the hospital in North Mitrovica announced that they are facing a shortage of food and medical supplies due to the closure of border crossings, which was their main supplier, further warning that they could soon face a humanitarian disaster.

==== September ====
On 5 September 2023, Kosovo police uncovered a significant weapons cache in Zvečan, describing the location as a logistical base intended for endangering public safety. The seizure included automatic rifles, ammunition, and explosives, which authorities linked to organized criminal groups operating in the north Kosovo.

On 21 September 2023 at 11:40 pm, an M75 hand grenade was detonated in an ethnically-mixed "Bosniak Neighborhood" in North Mitrovica. While no suspect was apprehended, Kosovo Interior Minister Xhelal Sveçla claimed that the preparator of the explosion was acting on the orders of Serbian President Aleksandar Vučić.

On 24 September 2023, a group of about 30 armed Kosovo Serbs and Serbian militants ambushed Kosovo Police units in the village of Banjska, Zvečan, North Kosovo, resulting in one policeman being killed and two others wounded. The armed group then entered the Banjska Monastery where pilgrims from Novi Sad had been staying and barricaded themselves inside before Kosovo Special Forces entered and cleared the monastery. At least three of the armed men were killed and the Kosovar Police apprehended six others.

==== October ====
Meetings in Brussels between Serbia and Kosovo in October made no progress with Kosovo claiming Serbia had not signed the February agreement nor the implementation plan whilst Serbia reiterated it could not agree to Kosovo independence nor Kosovo joining the UN.

==== November ====
Kosovo authorities extend the period in which Kosovo Serbs can convert their Serbian licence plates into Kosovar ones without incurring import fees, leading to over 1,500 cars in north Kosovo switching to the use of Kosovar licence plates as of 16 November.

==== December ====
By 16 December, 4,200 of the roughly 10,000 cars in circulation in the north switched to using Kosovo licence plates, per Kosovo Police. The remaining ones were registered in Serbia and their licence plates are valid in Kosovo because they make reference to cities in Serbia, not Kosovo. Kosovo Police additionally announced that all cars with licence plates such as KM (Kosovska-Mitrovica) would be seized if seen on the streets. In response, on 26 December Serbia announced that it was going to stop applying stickers to Kosovar licence plates and starting on 1 January 2024, RKS registration cars would be allowed to enter Serbia freely. According to them, this was done to facilitate border crossing for Kosovo Serbs who had switched to RKS plates. In response, the Kosovo government decided to stop applying stickers to cars with Serbian licence plates, in effect leading to both sides recognizing each-other's licence plates.

=== 2024 ===
==== January ====
On 15 January, three Kosovo Serbs were wounded outside of a bar in North Mitrovica after a car drove by and threw a grenade at them. Two suspects were apprehend by Kosovo Police though their identities were not disclosed to the public. Serbian President Aleksandar Vučić accused the United States of causing the grenade attack and claimed that the United Kingdom's MI6 was planning to start a war in the Balkans. Vučić's claims were criticized by analyst Ivana Stradner.

==== February ====
On 1 February, Kosovo forbade the use of the Serbian dinar as currency, requiring the ethnic-Serb minority in the north to adopt the Euro. The move was criticized by the U.S. and E.U. since the Serb minority relies on financial assistance and social benefit payments from the government of Serbia. Kosovo PM Kurti later clarified that the currency was not banned but that the Euro would be the only legal currency for commercial transactions and that there would be a months-long transition period to ease in the new legislation.

==== April ====
On 21–24 April, a series of Kosovo police raids in Mali Zvečan and Žerovnica resulted in the confiscation of automatic weapons, ammunition, and other military-grade equipment held by private individuals.

==== May ====
On 20 May, Kosovo police units entered the central branch of the Banka Poštanska štedionica in North Mitrovica, as well as its affiliates. The operation targeted financial flows deemed unregulated by the Central Bank of Kosovo, effectively cutting off the primary banking system used by the local Serb population.

==== August ====
On 5 August, in a coordinated action across all four northern municipalities, Kosovo authorities shut down nine facilities of the Post of Serbia. Police officials stated the closure was due to the "illegal operation of parallel postal services" on Kosovo territory.

On 12 August, 5 Kosovar Police officers were attacked in Gjakova when responding to a reports of a shooting. According to the police report, the incident occurred when an off-duty policemen was attacked by two suspects. Then three more police officers intervened and physically dealt with the suspects, two men and a woman were then arrested in connection with the case while three police officers were wounded due to the suspects resisting arrest.

On 25 August, Kosovo PM Kurti announced that the Ibar Bridge would reopen connection the Serb-majority town of North Mitrovica with the Albanian-majority town of South Mitrovica. The Government justified its action as in 2015 and 2016 both Serbia and the EU had agreed to begin the opening of the bridge. The move was supported by the city assembly of North Mitrovica, however due to the assembly having no Serbian representatives as the local elections were boycotted the move was seen as illegitimate. The move was criticized by the EU for unilateral decisions and the risk violence thus threatening a nearby KFOR unit in the area threatening Kosovo with further sanctions, by Serbia's Vučić for "installing new puppet politicians" by the Kosovan Government, and by opposition leaders claiming it to be a populist play to secure votes for the upcoming elections. Bedri Hamza, mayor of South Mitrovica and opposition candidate for Prime Minister, urged Kurti to work with International partners before opening the bridge.

On 30 August, Kosovo police conducted a broad operation sealing off municipal buildings used by Serbian-run institutions. This included the closure of the District Office for Kosovo and Metohija, the Pension Fund (PIO), and other administrative bodies deemed "parallel structures" violating Kosovo's constitution.

==== October ====
On 16 October, the premises of the Temporary Authority of the Municipality of Skenderaj (operating within the Serbian system) were raided and closed by the police, continuing the policy of dismantling Serbian administrative presence.

==== November ====
On 19 November, in a targeted police operation in Zvečan, Kosovo police discovered a cache of military equipment hidden in a residential building. The seizure included an automatic rifle, three magazines with 90 rounds of ammunition, and two hand grenades. The operation was described as part of an ongoing effort to eliminate illegal weaponry in the northern municipalities.

On 22 November, a separate police operation was conducted in Zvečan, where authorities raided a private home and arrested one individual. During the search, officers found and confiscated a pistol and a quantity of ammunition. The suspect was detained for illegal possession of weapons and violating public safety regulations.

On 24 November, Kosovo police executed a raid in the village of Grabovac (Zvečan). The operation resulted in the arrest of one person and the seizure of a diverse arsenal, including several rifles, pistols, and specialized military gear. Authorities stated that such operations are vital for neutralizing potential threats from armed groups in the region.

On 26 November, two hand grenades were thrown in the courtyard of the police station in Zvečan, and on 29 November, a suspected hand grenade was launched at the city's municipal building; neither caused any injuries or deaths. On the night of 29 November, an explosion in North Kosovo damaged infrastructure that supplied water to Kosovo's main power plants. Serbian officials claimed that the explosion was a false flag operation organized by Kosovo Albanians.

The next day on 30 November, Kosovar Police led a raid operation in 10 locations in and near Zubin Potok, which led to 8 Serbian individuals suspected in the attacks being arrested. Kosovar Police were also able to seize a large stash of weapons and explosives together with Yugoslav and Serbian military uniforms and badges.

Kosovar Prime minister Albin Kurti accused the Serbian government and the Serb list of organizing the attack, implicating Serbian president Aleksandar Vučić, along with Milan Radoičić, who had previously led a group of 30 armed militants in the Banjska attack. Kurti also compared the attack on the Ibër-Lepenc water canal with the Russian attacks in Donetsk and Luhansk, where they were trying to make Ukrainian soldiers enter both regions so that the Russians would have a justification to invade Ukraine.

The Serbian government denied all of Albin Kurti's accusations and so did the Serb list, claiming that they had no involvement in the attack.

The Albanian government stated that it is ready to supply Kosovo with electricity, which it started to supply at the end of November.

==== December ====
On 1 December 2024, following the explosion at the Ibar-Lepenac canal, the Kosovo Police arrested brothers Jovan and Dragiša Vićentijević. During the arrest, police discovered a service identification card of the Military Intelligence Agency (VOA) in Jovan Vićentijević possession. The prosecution alleged they were trained at the Pasuljanske Livade military base in Serbia to carry out attacks in Kosovo.

On 14 December 2024, at around 20:00, a self-accident occurred in the village of Grabovc, Zveçan, where an NJSO armored vehicle accidentally fell from a bridge. 8 Police officers in the vehicle were injured and the armored vehicle was heavily damaged.

Between 26 and 27 December 2024, Kosovo police closed three Serb parallel institutions in North Mitrovica. On 26 December two institutions were closed, the Directorate for Residential and Business Space and the Directorate for Construction Land. On 27 December another parallel institution was closed. According to vise-police chief of North Kosovo, Veton Elshani, the institution was closed however the police did not arrest any individuals. The institution was illegally receiving money from North-Kosovar Serbs and businesses and operated under Serbia.

=== 2025 ===
==== January ====
On 8 January 2025, Kosovar authorities closed a parallel institution in North Mitrovica called the "Tax agency of Serbia", which, according to Xhelal Sveçla was illegally gathering money from North Kosovar payments.

On 15 January 2025, Kosovo Police units conducted operations targeting Serbian municipal authority buildings and facilities of the Post of Serbia. The action resulted in the closure of these premises, further limiting the administrative capacity of Serbian institutions in the region.

==== February ====
On 21 February, Kosovo police raided and closed the Centers for Social Work in Leposavić and North Mitrovica. The authorities justified the move by claiming these institutions operated illegally under the Serbian system, leaving beneficiaries dependent on Pristina's social welfare system.

On 28 February 2025, Kosovo Police found an arsenal of weapons, ammunition and various military uniforms in the village of Rodel. The Kosovo Police later announced that the equipment in the arsenal had belonged to the Civilna Zastita. Kosovo's Interior Minister, Xhelal Sveçla stated that the police raid on the arsenal in Rodel proves that the Civilna Zastita is still active in Kosovo.

On 28 February 2025, Kosovo Police arrested Jelena Đukanović, a Serbian employee of the OSCE mission in Mitrovica, on charges of espionage. She was accused of collecting classified information and passing it to Serbian Security and Intelligence Agency.

==== March ====
On 18 March 2025, Albania, Croatia, and Kosovo signed a trilateral declaration on a military alliance in Tirana. The Kosovo Ministry of Defence stated that the goal of the alliance was "not to threaten anyone, but rather to send a signal to those who intend to put the region at risk." The Serbian Foreign Ministry accused Croatia and Albania of "undermining regional peace" by signing a military alliance with Kosovo.

==== April ====
In the early hours of 1 April 2025, a significant security incident occurred at the Kosovo Post Office in Zvečan, a Serb-majority municipality in northern Kosovo. Unknown individuals detonated two hand grenades at the facility, resulting in material damage but no reported injuries. The Kosovo government condemned the attack and labeled it as "an act of terrorism," and called upon law enforcement and judicial authorities to conduct a thorough investigation to bring the perpetrators to justice.

Also on 1 April 2025, Serbia and Hungary signed a defense agreement in Belgrade. The signing of the agreement was viewed by observers as a response to the tripartite agreement between Croatia, Albania and Kosovo which was signed in Tirana on 18 March 2025.

On 5 and 6 April 2025, Kosovo's security agencies conducted a coordinated operation detaining sixteen Serbs traveling in vehicles with Serbian license plates. Among the detainees were four active officers from Serbian security services. Interior Minister Xhelal Sveçla stated that the group was suspected of gathering intelligence on potential targets and had ties to Serbian military intelligence and the group responsible for the Banjska attack in September 2023.

On 16 April 2025, Kosovo Police announced that they had found weapons and ammunition in a basement in North Mitrovica. Deputy Director of the Kosovo Police in the Northern Region, Veton Elshani, announced that Kosovo Police had found and confiscated 8 AK style magazines, one rifle, several rifle optics, and a Serbian flag. All magazines were reported to have been loaded.

==== May ====
On 6 May, offices of the public enterprise Srbijašume in Leposavić were closed by Kosovo authorities. The facility was sealed, and official symbols of the Serbian institution were removed, drawing protests from the Serbian Office for Kosovo and Metohija.

On 13 May, Kosovo police units were deployed to the premises of the public water utility "Vodovod Ibar" in North Mitrovica. The operation marked the beginning of the transfer of local water management infrastructure to the Kosovo administration.

On 14 May, Kosovo police entered the "Center for Sport, Youth and Specialized Services" in North Mitrovica. Deputy Commander Veton Elshani confirmed the police presence, stating that the objective was to verify the status of the institution and its alignment with the Kosovo system.

On 15 May, authorities executed simultaneous takeovers of key infrastructure and public venues. In the morning, Kosovo Police seized control of the regional water purification plant in Zubin Potok, a critical facility near Lake Gazivode that supplies water to the region. The plant's operations were placed under the control of Pristina-appointed management. Later that afternoon, municipal inspectors, supported by police units, entered the Sports Hall in North Mitrovica, effectively transferring the management of the sports facility to the Kosovo municipal administration.

On 16 May, Kosovo police raided the offices of the National Employment Service (NSZ) in North Mitrovica. The closure of the NSZ represented the cessation of another key service provided by the Republic of Serbia to the local population.

On 27 May, Kosovo police entered the premises of the Sports and Tourism Organization in Leposavić. The Serbian flags in front of the building were removed and replaced with Kosovo flags, and the sign at the entrance to the sports hall was removed and a new one was installed.

==== June ====
On 5 June 2025, Basic Court in Pristina convicted Aleksandar Vlajić, a former Kosovo Police officer and member of the Serbian Security and Intelligence Agency (BIA), of espionage and collaboration with the BIA. He was sentenced to five years in prison for secretly recording police operations in North Kosovo and transmitting data to Serbian intelligence.

On 7 June 2025 at 9:00am, Serbian border police arrested Arbnor Spahiu, a former Kosovo Liberation Army soldier and former Police officer at Horgos, a village on the Serbia-Hungary border. Serbia accused Spahiu of participating in the Banjska attack. Kosovo Police Director, Gazmend Hoxha, stated that Spahiu has not been part of the Kosovo Police since 2022.

On 11 June 2025, Kosovo demanded Serbia to release Arbnor Spahiu.

On 13 June 2025, in response to Spahiu's arrest, the European Union stated, "The EU is closely following the arrest of Arbnor Spahiu by the Serbian authorities. We expect the Serbian authorities to respect and ensure the due implementation of the legal procedure."

On 14 June 2025, Kosovar authorities arrested and deported two Serbian men, Nikola Vujević and Mladen Milojević. Kosovo's Interior Minister, Xhelal Sveçla, claimed that they had been "recruited by Serbia's intelligence and security institution" and said that Vujević "poses a danger to our national security as a member of the Serbian police forces." The Office for Kosovo in the Government of Serbia condemned the arrest and claimed that it was "politically motivated revenge against the Serbian people."

==== August ====
In the early morning of 22 August 2025 at 1 am in Zvečan, an explosive was thrown at a car that belonged to the family of Serb List member and Zubin Potok council candidate Časlav Sofronijević. No casualties were reported.

==== September ====
On 4 September, Special Prosecution of Kosovo filed an indictment against Jelena Đukanović, charging her with actively assisting the Serbian Security and Intelligence Agency (BIA) by providing sensitive documents she accessed through her position at the OSCE.

On September 9, Kosovo police closed two parallel Serbian institutions in North Mitrovica. The two institutions were closed, the Branch of the Republic Pension and Disability Insurance Fund and the Branch of the Republic Health Insurance Fund.

==== October ====
On 12 October, local elections were held in Kosovo. After three years, the Serb List returned to power in the four Serb-majority municipalities in North Kosovo, reinstating ethnic Serb mayors. The result reestablished Serbian political control in the municipalities.

On 16 October, at 10:30 AM, the Kosovo Security Forces accidentally entered North Kosovo with two army trucks and a Humvee, violating their pact signed with NATO in 2013. Veton Elshani claimed that the KSF had entered the region accidentally due to a mistake with their GPS. The Serbian government for Kosovo called the incident a "direct violation of strong NATO guarantees".

==== November ====
On 3 November 2025, the Kosovo Police issued a press release informing the public about an incident that occurred near the Kosovo–Serbia border. Millan Vukashinović, a member of the Kosovar Insurance Bureau, was reportedly attacked and abducted by several masked men wearing camouflage uniforms without any identifying symbols, inside the territory of Kosovo. The incident was confirmed by witnesses and by Vukashinović’s lawyer. The Kosovo Police have accused Serbia’s Gendarmerie of being behind the attack. Vukashinović is currently hospitalized in Niš.

On 6 November 2025, Brigadier General Luca Piperni told reporters during an interview that NATO is ready to send more troops to Kosovo if tensions get worse.

=== 2026 ===
==== April ====
On 16 April 2026, Kosovo Police carried out six raids in the Serb majority villages of Banovë and Prevlak following information received from civilians. In the first raid 4 different types of rifles, 3 radios, 1 camera, 223 rounds of ammunition, and an undisclosed number of military uniforms, and weapon cleaning equipment were found in an uninhabited house. In a raid on a residential house, Kosovo police found an unlicensed rifle and three cartridges. They also arrested a man who was identified as "MR (1972)". After being interviewed at a police station, he was released by order of the prosecutor while he is also being investigated for the "unlicensed possession of weapons". In another raid on an uninhabited house, Kosovo Police called in explosive ordnance disposal units after an M75 hand grenade was found. Other items that were found during the raid included an AK-47 rifle, three magazines, and 88 rounds of ammunition. In the other raids, AK-47-type weapons with corresponding ammunition, an Zastava M48 rifle, a hunting rifle, several weapons parts, bayonets, and military uniforms were found in a barn. Interior Minister Dzheljalj Svečlja stated that the evidence gathered during the raids indicated that there are "continuous attempts at illegal activities with the potential to threaten security and stability in the country."

30 April, according to a poll that was conducted among Kosovo Serbs by the non-governmental organization Aktiv, as many as 74% of poll respondents said that they believed that things "are not going well", with 58% of poll respondents describing the political situation in Northern Kosovo as "very bad."

==== June ====
On 12 June 2026, US Air Force General and NATO's Supreme Allied Commander Europe Alexus G. Grynkewich announced that "calibrated reductions" in Kosovo Force's troop numbers would take place over the next year due to the "improved security situation" since the clashes in 2023. However, Grynkewich also said that a "change in the security situation" could lead to troop cuts being reversed.

==== July ====
On 21 July 2026, 11 villas owned by Serbs near Lake Gazivode were demolished by the Kosovar Ministry of Environment, Spatial Planning and Infrastructure while also being accompanied by the Kosovo Police. The demolition was requested by Hidrosistemi Ibër-Lepenc, a hydro company which claimed that the villas were illegally constructed on company property by the Serbs. The demolition was condemned by the European Union Office in Pristina, the German Embassy in Pristina, and the Organization for Security and Co-operation in Europe while the British Embassy in Pristina stated that it was both concerned and monitoring the situation closely.

==== August ====
On 10 August 2026, the NATO-led KFOR mission announced it had begun a "gradual transition of its permanent presence" at the main bridge over the Ibar River in Mitrovica, citing an "improved security situation." This marked the first reduction of KFOR's static presence at the flashpoint site since 1999. Italian Carabinieri removed their checkpoint tent from the northern side, and Kosovo Police vehicles immediately commenced patrols on the bridge. KFOR stated the process is "conditions-based" and coordinated with international stakeholders, though it remains the "first responder" for security

The move triggered immediate opposition. The Serb List party strongly condemned the withdrawal, calling the bridge a "site of serious tensions and conflicts" and demanding an urgent meeting with KFOR Commander Major General Özkan Ulutaş. They argued Kosovo Police "have failed to build the trust of the Serbian people." Serbian President Aleksandar Vučić stated that while the move was "not unexpected," Serbia's official response was that such a withdrawal "must not be allowed," citing the need to protect the Serb community from potential harassment.

==== October ====
On 14 October 2026, Italian Major General Roberto Vergori took over command of KFOR from Turkish Major General Ozkan Ulutas.

On 15 October 2026, Vergori and Admiral George Wikoff toured Northern Kosovo. During the tour they met with personnel from both KFOR and the Kosovo Police along the administrative line and then met with municipal president Milos Perovic in Zubin Potok, and they also visited the Gracanica Monastery. Vergori, Ulutas, and Wikoff also met with representatives from Serb List and the Eparchy of Raška and Prizren where they reiterated to the Serb List representatives that KFOR's mission remains unchanged.

== Reactions ==
In early August, Edi Rama, the prime minister of Albania, commented on the tensions that occurred on 31 July and stated that Kosovo should join the Open Balkan economic and political zone in order to avoid potential war; this was later echoed by Hill. Maria Zakharova, the spokeswoman of the ministry of foreign affairs of Russia, accused Kosovo Albanians of escalating the conflict, while Dmitry Peskov, the Kremlin press secretary, stated that Russia demands that "all rights of Serbs to be respected". Later in December, Peskov said that "Russia supports Belgrade in the actions that are being taken". Richard Grenell, the special presidential envoy for Serbia and Kosovo Peace Negotiations under the administration of Donald Trump, stated that he was disappointed with the progress of the negotiations.

After the leak of the proposed agreement in late September 2022, Dušan Janjić from the Belgrade Forum for Ethnic Relations stated that the agreement is about "putting the dialogue exclusively on a political level", while Bodo Weber, a journalist and political analyst, stated that the agreement "might change the flow of the dialogue" but he also assessed that "Kosovo and Serbia are still far from a final agreement". Milorad Dodik, the president of Republika Srpska, stated that the Republika Srpska, an entity of Bosnia and Herzegovina, is "ready to help the Serbian people in Kosovo, even beyond its capacity". Later in January 2023, Dodik praised Vučić regarding his role in the crisis and stated that "Serbia should never recognize Kosovo". Weber described the mass resignation of Kosovo Serbs from Kosovo institutions as "the crisis as a consequence of the de facto absence of negotiations". Konrad Clewing, an expert for the Leibniz Institute for Eastern and Southeastern European Research, stated that the mass resignation could create "huge consequences".

After the announcement that Serbia would consider deploying 1,000 Serbian military forces to Kosovo, Deutsche Welle stated that the request to deploy is possible according to Resolution 1244, although observers noted that the deployment would be "futile because it would lead to a direct confrontation with the international police and military units stationed in Kosovo". Radio Free Europe stated that according to the Resolution 1244, Serbian personnel could return and perform certain functions in Kosovo, although these functions only include connection with the international civilian mission and international security presence, clearing minefields, maintaining a presence at Serbian cultural heritage sites and at main border crossings. Analysts also stated that the request would most likely be declined. Boris Tadić, former president of Serbia, criticized the government of Serbia and stated that Petković and Brnabić "misled the public", while Momir Stojanović, the former head of the Military Security Agency, said that the return of Serbian forces to Kosovo is "impossible". Rama described it as a "surreal move". Janjić stated that "it is not illegal to consider doing this" but that "in this case it is not desirable", while Ivo Visković, a diplomat and former professor at the Faculty of Political Sciences at the University of Belgrade, stated that "now is the time when diplomacy should work". Additionally, the United States and Peter Stano, the spokesperson of the European Union, asked for de-escalation.

In January 2023, politicians and political parties in Serbia voiced their reactions regarding the French-German proposal. Tadić claimed that the proposal would allow Kosovo to join the United Nations even if it is not explicitly mentioned in the proposal. Narodna, Dveri, National Democratic Alternative, and Serbian Party Oathkeepers have called for the rejection of the proposal. The Party of Freedom and Justice, Democratic Party, and Do not let Belgrade drown have called for Vučić to reveal the content of the proposal to the public. In Kosovo, publicist Veton Surroi assessed that "these negotiations are the most serious since the Ahtisaari Plan", while Avdullah Hoti, the former prime minister of Kosovo, stated that "relations with the United States are of existential importance to Kosovo".

In June 2023 the EU announced a number of "reversible" measures against Kosovo for its failure to restore peace and calm in North Kosovo. Following the questionable role of the Serbian state in the September lethal attack by Serb gunmen, 12 countries have asked the EU to reverse the measures.

On 7 September 2024, Kosovo shut two border crossings after protesters blocked roads amid tensions over actions taken in Kosovo's Serb-majority north. Serbia, which does not acknowledge Kosovo's independence, alleges that Kosovo is violating the rights of ethnic Serbs.

== See also ==
- North Kosovo crisis (2011–2013)
- 2021 North Kosovo crisis
