= Afrim Bunjaku =

Kosovan police officer (1973–2023)

- Born: 15 April 1973; Samadrexhë, SAP Kosovo, SR Serbia, Yugoslavia
- Died: 24 September 2023 (aged 50); Banjska, Zvečan, Kosovo
- Occupation: Police officer
- Awards: Hero of Kosovo order (posthumous)
- Military career
- Conflicts: North Kosovo crisis (2022–2026): Banjska attack †

Afrim Bunjaku (15 April 1973 – 24 September 2023) was a Kosovo Police sergeant who was killed in the Banjska attack in northern Kosovo. He was posthumously awarded the Hero of Kosovo order, the country's highest decoration.

== Early life and career ==
Bunjaku was from the village of Samadrexhë in the municipality of Vushtrri. He was married to Lumnije and they had three children.

He graduated from the Kosovo Police Service School in 2001 and served at the police station in Vushtrri until 4 May 2007, when he was promoted to sergeant. He then spent seven years as a team leader at the police station in South Mitrovica. In 2014 he returned to Vushtrri to work as an instructor at the Kosovo Academy for Public Safety. From 2015 he led the response team at the Vushtrri police station, and on 6 January 2023 he was assigned to the police station in Zvečan as supervisor of the patrol team. He was also the shift commander on the night of the attack. By the time of his death he had served 22 years in the Kosovo Police.

== Death ==
In the early hours of 24 September 2023, armed Kosovo Serbs blocked the road in the village of Banjska with trucks. When Kosovo Police arrived at the scene, gunfire broke out and Bunjaku, aged 50, was killed. Kosovo officials said the patrol was first hit by a remotely detonated anti-personnel mine, followed by bursts of gunfire from various weapons. Other officers were wounded. The attackers then withdrew to Banjska Monastery, where they were surrounded by police. Three of them were killed in the hours-long exchange of fire that followed.

Kosovo prosecutors said the group was led by Kosovo Serb businessman Milan Radoičić, who had earlier admitted leading the group but denied guilt when questioned by prosecutors in Belgrade. Prime Minister Albin Kurti described the attack as the work of terrorists supported by Serbia, while Serbian President Aleksandar Vučić said it was carried out by "desperate local Serbs".

== Honours and funeral ==
On 25 September 2023, President Vjosa Osmani posthumously awarded Bunjaku the Hero of Kosovo order at a commemorative meeting in Pristina. He was buried the same day with state honours in the village of Samadrexhë, near Vushtrri.

== Legacy ==
On the first anniversary of the attack, in September 2024, the Kosovo government renamed the road leading from Ballaban to Banjska after him. In September 2026, a foundation stone was laid in Banjska for a memorial to him.

== Legal proceedings ==
On 24 April 2026, the Pristina Basic Court convicted three Kosovo Serbs of terrorism and serious acts against the constitutional order of Kosovo in connection with the attack. Two were sentenced to life imprisonment and one to 30 years. Serbia's government office for Kosovo called the verdict politically motivated. Most of the other suspects remain at liberty, most likely in Serbia.
