= Banjska =

Banjska may refer to:

- Banjska (village), Zvečan, Kosovo
  - Banjska Monastery
- Banjska River, Serbia; a river, a right tributary of the Toplica River
- Banjška planota or Banjšice Plateau, a karst plateau in Goriška, Slovenia

== See also ==
- 2023 Banjska attack
