= Gazmend Hoxha =

General Director of The Kosovo Police since March 2023

- Born: 27 July 1977 (age 49); Korroticë e Epërme, Gllogoc (Drenas), SAP Kosovo, SR Serbia, SFR Yugoslavia
- Education: University of Prishtina
- Known for: Counter-terrorism response during the Banjska attack
- Police career
- Allegiance: Kosovo
- Department: Kosovo Police
- Service years: 2000–present
- Status: Active
- Rank: Colonel
- Other work: Lecturer at the Kosovo Academy for Public Safety

Gazmend Hoxha (born 27 July 1977) is a Kosovan police officer who currently serves as the general director of the Kosovo Police. Appointed in March 2023, he previously held high-ranking positions, including the director of the Operations Department and the director of special units.

== Early life and education ==
Hoxha was born in the village of Korroticë e Epërme, in the municipality of Gllogoc (Drenas). He holds a bachelor's degree from the Faculty of Law at the University of Prishtina, where he also completed a master's degree in Criminal Law. As of 2023, he is pursuing doctoral studies at the Faculty of Security in Skopje, North Macedonia.

In addition to his formal education, Hoxha has completed specialized training in management and security in the United States, Germany, France, and Turkey. He speaks English and Serbian fluently.

== Career ==
Hoxha joined the Kosovo Police in 2000 as part of the third generation of cadets. He began his service as a patrol officer at the South Station in Pristina.

=== Rise through the ranks ===
He rose rapidly through the command structure, becoming a sergeant in 2002 and a lieutenant in 2003. By 2005, he was promoted to captain and served as the commander of the North Station and later the South Station in Pristina. In 2006, he was promoted to major and assigned as the regional deputy director for investigations in Gjilan.

In December 2008, Hoxha was appointed director of the Special Units Division. He later served as the regional director in Ferizaj (2009) and head of the Organized Crime Department (2010). He attained the rank of lieutenant colonel in 2012 and colonel in 2019. From 2020 to 2023, he served as the director of the Operations Department at the General Directorate.

=== Operational command ===
Prior to becoming general director, Hoxha managed several high-profile and sensitive police operations, particularly concerning the rule of law in North Kosovo. These included:

- The license plate reciprocity operations (September–October 2021).
- Operations against illegal cryptocurrency mining.
- The closure of illegal border roads utilized for smuggling.
- Preventing the organization of the Serbian constitutional referendum and Serbian elections within Kosovo territory without government approval.

=== General director ===
In March 2023, Hoxha was appointed general director of the Kosovo Police by the Government of Kosovo, succeeding Samedin Mehmeti.

== Role in North Kosovo crisis ==
Hoxha took office during a period of significant tension in the northern municipalities following the collective resignation of ethnic Serb police officers.

=== Banjska attack ===
Hoxha was the general director during the Banjska attack on 24 September 2023, where an armed paramilitary group attacked Kosovo Police units, resulting in the death of sergeant Afrim Bunjaku. Hoxha oversaw the counter-terrorism operation in Banjska, which resulted in the neutralization of several attackers and the seizure of a large cache of military-grade weaponry.

He has frequently appeared in press conferences to present evidence linking the paramilitary group to external state actors and coordinates security efforts with EULEX and KFOR.

== See also ==
- North Kosovo crisis (2022–2026)
