= Veton Elshani =

Veton Elshani is a Kosovar police officer currently serving as the deputy director of the Kosovo Police for the North Region. He is known for his operational leadership and frequent media presence during the security crises in North Kosovo spanning from 2022 to present.

== Career ==
Elshani has served in various capacities within the Kosovo Police. He previously held the position of deputy director of the Directorate for International Cooperation in the Field of Rule of Law (ILECU).

Following the collective resignation of ethnic Serb police officers and commanders in the four northern municipalities (North Mitrovica, Zvečan, Leposavić, and Zubin Potok) in November 2022, the command structure in the region was severely depleted. Elshani was appointed as the acting deputy director for the North Region to manage police operations and fill the security vacuum.

== Role in North Kosovo crisis ==
Since late 2022, Elshani has effectively served as the primary spokesperson and operational commander for the Kosovo Police in the Serb-majority north. He has been the central figure in communicating with both local media and international press regarding security measures, often emphasizing the police's goal to "provide safety for all citizens regardless of ethnicity."

=== Operational management ===
Elshani coordinated police units during several high-tension events, including:

- The implementation of the decision on car license plates.
- Securing the extraordinary municipal elections in April 2023.
- Managing the violent protests in Zvečan in May 2023, where KFOR soldiers were injured.
- The immediate response and lockdown measures following the Banjska attack in September 2023.

In the aftermath of the Banjska attack, Elshani oversaw the extensive search and sweep operations in the northern municipalities to locate hidden weapons caches and suspects involved in the paramilitary assault.
