= Milan Radoičić =

Serbian businessman and paramilitary leader (born 1978)

- Милан Радоичић

Personal details
- Born: 21 February 1978 (age 48) Đakovica, SR Serbia, Yugoslavia (now Gjakova, Kosovo)
- Party: Serb List
- Spouse: Ema Radoičić
- Children: 3

Military service
- Allegiance: Northern Brigade

Milan Radoičić (Serbian Cyrillic: Милан Радоичић, Albanian: Milan Radoiçiq; born 21 February 1978) is a Kosovo Serb businessman and politician, and a former vice president of the Serb List. He has been linked to organized crime, and led an armed group that conducted an attack against Kosovo Police in the village of Banjska in September 2023, resulting in the deaths of three Serb militants and one police officer. The attack was classified as a terrorist attack by the European Parliament. Following the attack, Radoičić fled into Serbia with other militants, so in September 2024 Kosovar prosecutors charged him in absentia, along with 44 others, with violating the constitutional order, terrorism, funding terrorism, and money laundering in connection with the Banjska attack. In April 2025, a Kosovar prosecutors issued an arrest warrant for him and 19 others for alleged war crimes committed in Gjakova.

== Career ==
=== Business career ===
Radoičić was born in 1978 in Đakovica, SAP Kosovo, SR Serbia, Yugoslavia.

He, his team and his groomsman Zvonko Veselinović have developed businesses throughout Serbia, Kosovo and Montenegro, mainly in the field of trade and transport.

He first gained media attention in 2013, when it was reported that together with Zvonko Veselinović, he had been accused of aiding and abetting abuse in a public lawsuit. The same suit charged Goran Makragić and Ivan Stamenović with abuse of public position. The indictment alleges that the four defendants dug gravel on the Dimitrovgrad-Pirot section, which is part of Corridor 10, "without proper consent of the Ministry of Mining and Natural Resources, and without paying compensation to local authorities, and delivered it to builders on the route of the new road." In 2019, an appelate court acquitted Veselinović, Makragić and Stamenović, who had been sentenced to two years by a lower court in a second instance verdict, and confirmed the previous acquittal of Radoičić of charges of illegal gravel excavation.

In 2021, a corruption scandal involving the Brezovica ski resort emerged, whereby municipal officials received large bribes in exchange for turning a blind eye to the construction of hotels and villas within an officially protected zone of the resort. Radoičić was implicated in the Brezovica case after he allegedly attempted to bribe the whistleblower for withdraw of his testimony.

Radoičić is a representative of FK Trepča.

=== Political career ===
He was the vice president of the Serb List, an ethnic Serb minority political party in Kosovo, until his resignation in September 2023.

In the summer of 2017, Radoičić and Goran Rakić, the president of the Serb List met with Behgjet Pacolli, a former Minister of Foreign Affairs of Kosovo in Budva to discuss the possibility of the Serb List joining the government of Kosovo and supporting Ramush Haradinaj who is wanted by Serbia for alleged war crimes, as the ex-prime minister.

On 12 September 2017, the President of Serbia, Aleksandar Vučić, mentioned Radoičić as one of the "guardians of Serbia in Kosovo and Metohija".

=== Criminal career ===
==== Oliver Ivanović murder ====
In a posthumous interview with BIRN, Oliver Ivanović, leader of the Freedom of Democracy and Justice Civic Initiative, described Radoičić as one of the main centers of power in North Kosovo and expressed concern that President Vučić mentioned him as a "guardian of Serbia". Ivanović was assassinated a few months later.

Radoičić and Goran Rakić participated in the meeting with President Vučić and Kosovo Serbs in Belgrade on 22 November 2018. A day later, the Kosovan police special unit ROSU arrested four people in the North Kosovo on 23 November in connection with the murder of Ivanović. Prime Minister of Kosovo, Ramush Haradinaj confirmed that Radoičić was one of the people suspected of the assassination of Ivanović. Radoičić stated that he did not plan to give himself up because Kosovan police wants to murder him.

On 26 November 2018, President Vučić told RTS that Radoičić certainly did not kill Ivanović and that he "did not participate in the organization, logistics, incitement" to murder. He added that Radoičić "was always the first to defend North Mitrovica". In July 2019, Kosovo prosecutor Sulj Hoxha stated that an international arrest warrant had been issued for Radoičić and pointed out that he was suspected of helping and organizing the group for the murder of Oliver Ivanović, but also of being suspected of organized crime and drug trafficking. In March 2021, the warrant for his arrest was revoked.

==== 2023 Banjska attack ====
Radoičić led a group of Serbian militants that clashed with Kosovo Police in Banjska on 24 September 2023. The attack resulted in one policeman and three militants getting killed. Radočić was allegedly wounded which was denied by Serbian president Aleksandar Vučić who also announced that Radoičić is currently on the territory of Central Serbia and added that Radoičić will be questioned by the Serbian authorities. On 29 September, Radoičić's lawyer read Radoičić's statement, admitting that he organized the attack and that he "personally made all the logistical preparations", adding that the Serbian government had no knowledge of what was to happen. He described the attack as a way to "encourage Serbs to resist the terror of Kurti's regime". The following day Radoičić was questioned by the Serbian authorities in Belgrade. Radoičić's properties were raided by the Kosovo Police. In December 2023, Interpol issued an arrest warrant for Radoičić.

In September 2024, he was among 45 people who were charged by Kosovar prosecutors with violation of the constitutional and legal order, terror activities, funding terrorism and money laundering in connection with the incident. The trial commenced on 9 October, with only three of the charged arrested, all pleading not guilty. Their trial was separated from Radoičić and 41 others, with the Basic Court in Pristina asking Kosovo's Supreme Court to rule on whether the latter could be tried in absentia.

==== Alleged involvement in Ibar-Lepenac canal attack ====
On the evening of 29 November 2024, an explosion in North Kosovo damaged infrastructure that supplied water to Kosovo's two main power plants. In the aftermath, Kosovo authorities arrested eight individuals linked to the attack, with investigations revealing the use of explosives and connections to the local Serb organisation Civilna Zastita. Kosovar Prime minister Albin Kurti accused the Serbian government and the Serb list, headed by Radoičić, of orchestrating the attack.

=== Sanctions ===
On 8 December 2021, the U.S. Department of the Treasury added Radoičić to its Specially Designated Nationals (SDN) list. Individuals on the list have their assets blocked and U.S. persons are generally prohibited from dealing with them. Zvonko Veselinović, his brother Žarko, Milan Radoičić and two others were described as belonging to corrupt networks connected to transnational organized crime, involved in the bribing of Kosovo and Serbian security officials to allow the smuggling of goods, drug money and weaponry.

On 9 December 2022 the United Kingdom HM Treasury imposed sanctions, considering Radoičić an involved person under the Global Anti-Corruption Sanctions Regulations, involved in serious corruption.

In April 2024, Kosovar authorities seized most of Radoičić's assets in the country.

=== 2025 arrest warrant ===
On 15 April 2025, a Pristina court issued an arrest warrant for Radoičić and 19 others for alleged war crimes against civilians in Gjakova during the Kosovo War in 1999, including the killing of 106 Albanians and the inhumane detention of 300 others.
