= Banjska attack =

2023 armed attack by a Serbian Paramilitary group in Northern Kosovo

- Part of North Kosovo crisis (2022–2026)
- Aerial image showing Serbian militants and vehicles during the Banjska attack
Date	23–24 September 2023
Location	Banjska, Kosovo
Result	Kosovar victory: Kosovo Police Special Forces entered and recaptured Banjska Monastery; Heavy arsenal of weapons seized; Remaining militants withdrew to Serbia

Belligerents
Kosovo	Serbian militants

Commanders and leaders
Gazmend Hoxha; Veton Elshani; Afrim Bunjaku †; Amir Gërguri	Milan Radoičić (WIA)

Units involved
Kosovo Police; Special Intervention Unit (SIU); Kosovo Intelligence Agency	Civilna Zaštita; Northern Brigade

Strength
460 special forces (claimed by Serbia)	80+ militants 26 SUVs; 2 APCs

Casualties and losses
1 policeman killed 2 policemen injured	3 militants killed 8 militants captured 2–6 militants injured 3 drones seized 2 ATVs seized 2 APCs and 26 SUVs seized

The Banjska attack (Albanian: Sulmi në Banjskë; Serbian: Напад у Бањској, romanized: Napad u Banjskoj) was an armed assault carried out by Serb militants against the Kosovo Police on 24 September 2023, in the village of Banjska in Northern Kosovo.

Between 23 and 24 September 2023, Serb militants initiated an attack on Kosovo police as they responded to a situation where trucks lacking license plates were blocking a bridge in Banjska. This incident resulted in the death of Kosovar sergeant Afrim Bunjaku, who was posthumously honoured with the Hero of Kosovo order. Subsequently, the attackers sought refuge within Banjska Monastery, which was eventually retaken by the Kosovo Police. During this operation, three of the militants were killed, and a significant cache of weaponry was confiscated. A total of eight people were subsequently apprehended, four of whom were later released. Notably, Serb List Vice-president Milan Radoičić was implicated and later admitted responsibility for the attack, leading to his subsequent arrest. He was released after one day of detention and is now a free man in Serbia, but he cannot leave the country.

In the aftermath of the attack, Kosovo, Albania, and the European Union, along with several other nations, issued condemnations. Kosovo, the European Union and European Parliament classified the incident as a terrorist attack. Kosovo's Assembly denounced the incident and called for an international inquiry into alleged Serbian state involvement, urging appropriate measures by Western nations. Furthermore, the buildup of Serbian military forces along the Kosovo border prompted regional widespread concern, with calls for de-escalation and the bolstering of NATO deployments. Kosovo alleged Serbian state involvement, presenting evidence of training on Serbian territory. Concurrently, the Kosovo Intelligence Agency confirmed reports of a Serbian base construction near the border.

== Background ==
The attack in Banjska occurred within a context of increased tensions in the region. After the decision of Prime Minister Albin Kurti to block all Serbian license plates with the letters KM (Kosovska Mitrovica) within the Republic of Kosovo, citing constitutional concerns, Kosovo Serbs working in the public sector, including the mayors of four municipalities in northern Kosovo, resigned in protest. After the boycott of the mayors and administrative staff, new elections were scheduled. In November 2022, President Vjosa Osmani set 18 December as the date for new elections in the four municipalities in northern Kosovo. However, after new clashes erupted in northern Kosovo, Osmani decided to postpone the mayoral elections until April 2023. This decision received support from European Union (EU) ambassadors.

In the days leading up to the rescheduled elections, the main political party in Serb-dominated northern Kosovo, the Serb List, called on the Serb community not to vote, resulting in a boycott of local elections by Serbs in the area who demanded more autonomy. Despite the boycott, a few Kosovo Serbs and the local minority of Albanians in northern Kosovo participated in the elections. Due to the boycott, all four newly elected mayors in the northern municipalities came from Albanian parties. Following the elections, members of the Kosovo Serb community staged protests in front of municipal buildings in northern Kosovo, expressing their discontent with the newly elected mayors. These protests were closely monitored by the Kosovo Police, the European Union Rule of Law Mission in Kosovo (EULEX), and NATO peacekeeping forces. Confrontations transpired between KFOR troops and Kosovo Serb protesters, resulting in injuries sustained by both military personnel and demonstrators.

== Attack ==
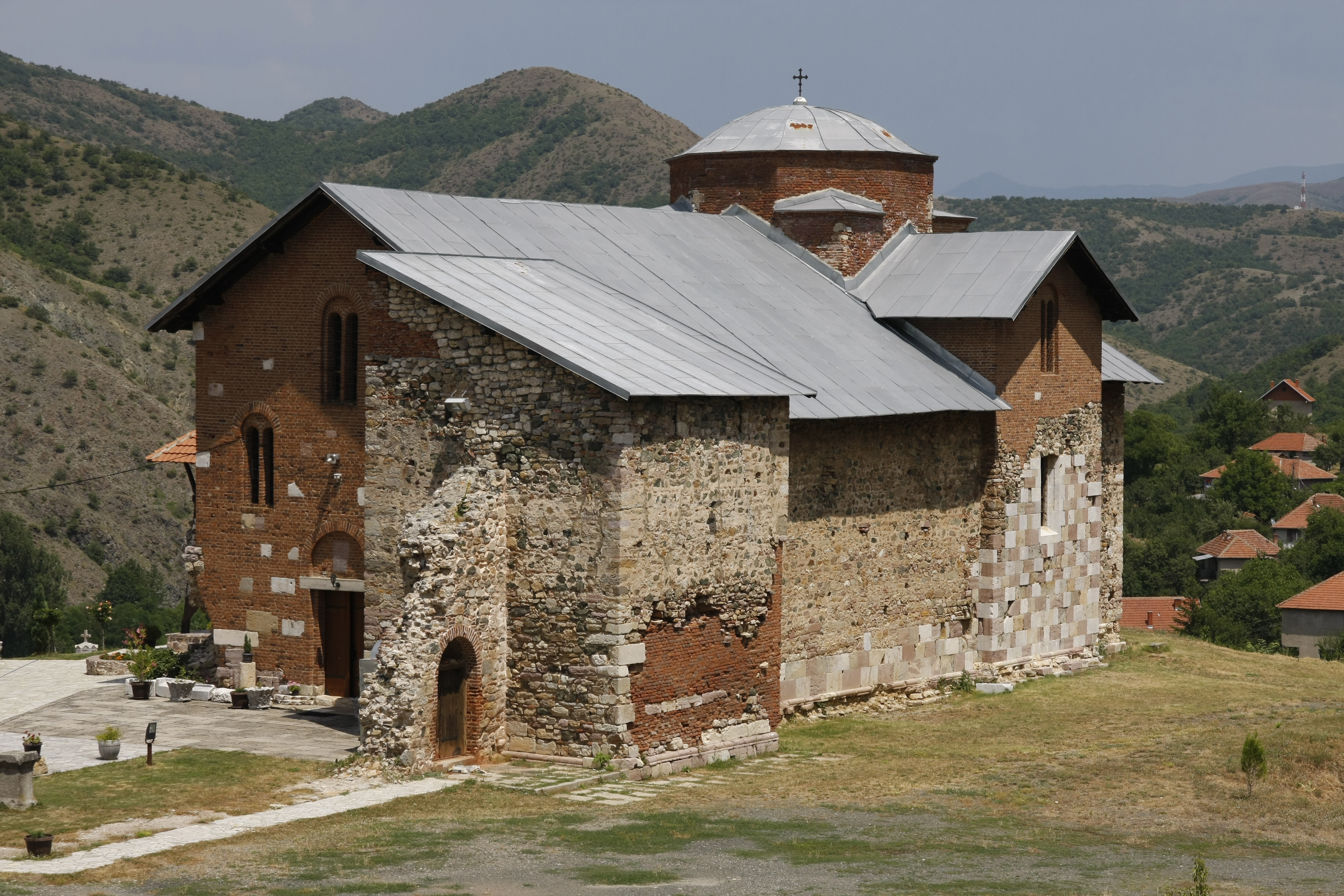
The 14th century monastery, the Banjska Monastery, in which the Serbian militants barricaded themselves in.

Between 23 and 24 September 2023, two trucks without licence plates were placed on a bridge at the entrance to the village of Banjska, blocking the road. The blockade was reported to the police in the early morning hours of 24 September. At around 2:30 (CET) three police units arrived at the scene, whereupon they were attacked from different directions by an armed group of about 30 men, with a variety of weapons, including grenades. In a preliminary report on the incident in October, the Kosovo government stated that more than 80 militants were involved. In the initial shootout, the Kosovar police forces managed to repel the initial attack. Three Kosovar policemen were wounded and transported to the regional hospital in south Mitrovica, but one of them died upon arrival.

After the ambush, the group of armed men entered the 14th century Banjska Monastery and barricaded themselves inside before being encircled by Kosovar security forces. The Eparchy of Raška and Prizren of the Serbian Orthodox Church, which governs the monastery, said that the men, who were wearing masks, broke through the locked gate of the monastery and storming the complex in an armoured vehicle. A group of pilgrims from Novi Sad, Vojvodina were at the monastery at the time of the attack. At 17:27 (CET), Kosovo Special Forces entered and recaptured the monastery, ending the siege. Xhelal Sveçla, Kosovo's Minister of Internal Affairs stated that the village was brought under control after "several consecutive battles" throughout the day. EULEX, the EU mission that acts as the second security responder in Kosovo, was also at the scene.

=== Weaponry ===
Kosovar authorities initially apprehended eight people, four of which were subsequently released for lack of evidence. The arrested included two gunmen, along with four other Serbs discovered in possession of communication near the incident site, who were investigated for terrorism.

Subsequently, a substantial cache of weaponry was seized by the Kosovo Police at the Banjska Monastery. Vehicles utilised by the attackers were impounded, revealing an extensive arsenal of firearms, explosives, ammunition and logistical support capable of sustaining a group numbering in the hundreds. The Kosovo Police confiscated more than 1,000 weapons and pieces of equipment valued at more than 5 million euros (more than $5.5m). Kosovo state officials said that the confiscated weapons were produced in Serbia and cannot be found on the open market. During the search of the monastery and associated vehicles, authorities uncovered maps and detailed plans, indicative of a meticulously organized, long-term operation. The items encompassed rocket launchers, a heavily armored vehicle, 24 automobiles, two 4×4 motorcycles, 150 explosives, three drones, 30 AK-47s (Serbian made), six machine guns, 29 mortars, and over 100 military uniforms. On 6 March 2024, Kosovo Police found five M80 Zolja rocket launchers which they suspect were related to the attack.

=== Attackers ===
The identity and background of the attackers was not known publicly. They were described as "gunmen" and "Serbian militants". Prosecutor Naim Abazi confirmed that the arrested militants were Serbian citizens. Minister Sveçla said that six gunmen had escaped to Serbia and were receiving treatment for their injuries at a hospital in Novi Pazar. He demanded their extradition to Kosovo. He also claimed that Serbia was operating training camps for "insurgents" and said Kosovar authorities were also investigating Russian involvement in the attack.

On 26 September, Kosovo Police unveiled drone video evidence implicating Serb List Vice-president Milan Radoičić as being part of the militant group. The party retains close affiliations to Serbian President Aleksandar Vučić. Radoičić's weapon permits were left behind. Later in an interview, Vučić acknowledged that Radoičić was "a freedom fighter". On 29 September, Radoičić took responsibility for the attack stating through a lawyer that the attack was organised without the knowledge of Serbian authorities or the Serb List, from which he resigned. The same day, Kosovar authorities raided properties he owned, including an lakeside villa, a penthouse apartment and a restaurant.

On 3 October, Milan Radoičić was arrested by Serbian authorities following a police raid on his residence and other associated premises. Sveçla described the arrest of the latter as a "symbolic move by Serbia to alleviate Western pressure", emphasising that Kosovo will not establish good neighborly relations with Serbia as long as it "sponsors terrorism". The following day however, the Supreme Court in Belgrade denied a motion from the public prosecutor's office to place Radoičić in custody for 30 days and released him.

On 11 September 2024, Kosovar authorities charged Radoičić and 44 others with violating constitutional and legal order, terrorist activity and financing and money laundering related to the attack. Their trial began on 9 October, with only three defendants physically present and the rest in absentia. On 24 April 2026, the three men, Blagoje Spasojević, Vladimir Tolić, and Dušan Maksimović, were found guilty of terrorism and "serious acts against the constitutional order and security of Kosovo". Spasojević and Tolić were sentenced to life while Maksimović received 30 years.

=== Casualties ===
On the Kosovar side, police sergeant Afrim Bunjaku was killed by the Serb militants. He was posthumously awarded with the order Hero of Kosovo.

Three Serb militants were killed. One of the attackers that was killed was identified as Bojan Mijailović, a former bodyguard of Serbian Minister for Kosovo Aleksandar Vulin in 2013. On 25 September, the body of another Serb militant was found by Kosovar authorities, initially reported as the fourth attacker. Kosovo officials later clarified that this report was inaccurate and that it was the third attacker. On 26 September, photos were released showing the bodies of two Serb militants inside a police vehicle.

== Aftermath ==
=== Resolutions ===
==== Kosovo and Albania ====
On 28 September, the Assembly of Kosovo unanimously adopted a resolution, securing 97 votes in favor with no opposing votes or abstentions. The resolution strongly denounced the assault as a "terrorist attack", lamenting the death of sergeant Afrim Bunjaku and emphasising the compelling necessity for a thorough international inquiry into Serbian involvement. Prime Minister Kurti also issued an appeal to Western nations, urging them to enforce punitive measures against Serbia and actively facilitate the extradition of the assailants to Kosovo. In a subsequent development on October 4, the Parliament of Albania announced its plans to convene a session, intending to ratify an extensive 13-point resolution in its forthcoming session. The resolution encompassed the denouncement of the assault, expressed support for security initiatives, commends Kosovo's security institutions, called on Serbia to cease hostile actions and advocated for a transparent investigation and extradition of the perpetrators for prosecution. On 12 October, the parliament unanimously approved the resolution, endorsing Albania's constitutional institutions to actively engage in the ongoing international community-led investigative efforts.

==== European Union ====
On 19 October, the European Parliament adopted a resolution on the incident, condemning what it described as a terrorist attack, while also scrutinizing the Serbian government's stance towards Kosovo and its Western allies. The parliamentary action attributed the attack to Serbian paramilitaries and raised concerns about potential Serbian involvement in recent political unrest. It called for measures against the Serbian government, encompassing the possibility of freezing financial support and implementing targeted sanctions in case of confirmed state involvement. It also called Serbia to engage in full cooperation, including the apprehension and extradition of those responsible for the attack, who are presently residing in Serbia, to face justice within Kosovo. The document also delved into the matter of military build-up, the formulation of containment strategies, early local elections, and the need for reconciliation and the integration of Kosovo's Serb community. Aside from promoting peaceful dialogue between Serbia and Kosovo, the resolution also emphasized the removal of punitive measures against Kosovo and outlined a comprehensive roadmap for Kosovo's European Union integration. The resolution garnered support from Kosovo's Prime Minister Kurti and Deputy Prime Minister Besnik Bislimi.

=== Serbian state involvement ===
On 1 October, Kurti published multiple videos on the social media platform Twitter, claiming to present proof of the Serbian attackers' training in connection with the attack. He revealed that the group had trained at the Serbian army base of Pasuljanske Livade four days prior to the attacks. Kurti and Kosovo Police Director Gazmend Hoxha also alleged additional exercises occurred at the Kopaonik base owned by Milan Radoičić and implicated full Serbian state support under Serbian President Vučić's leadership. Kurti later disclosed that the "terrorist attack" was part of a broader plan aimed at "annexing the northern territories of Kosovo", with the intention of "establishing a corridor to Serbia" for the supply of weapons and troops.

On a similar note, Minister Sveçla revealed that the attack had strategic objectives including the "annexation of northern Kosovo". Evidence retrieved from confiscated drone footage confirmed the attack's preparation within Serbia. Sveçla implicated high-ranking Serbian officials, including Vučić, Defense Minister Miloš Vučević and commander Milan Mojsilović, in the training of the attackers. Hoxha also asserted that Serbia furnished logistical support and infrastructure to the group.

=== Serbian military buildup and base construction ===
On 30 September, the government of the United States officially noted an unusually high presence of Serbian military forces positioned along the Kosovo border. In response, John Kirby, the National Security Council Coordinator for Strategic Communications, called on Serbian authorities to de-escalate the situation and characterized the deployment as "destabilizing". Kosovo President Osmani, expressed a strong commitment to closely collaborate with the US on that issue and other NATO allies in addressing "security challenges and protecting hard-won freedoms". Edi Rama, the Prime Minister of Albania, affirmed Albania's alignment with the US' appeal for an immediate de-escalation and emphasised the nation's commitment to ensuring the security and stability of Kosovo. The German Foreign Ministry called upon Serbia to withdraw its troops from the border with Kosovo, emphasising that there "must be no further escalation between Serbia and Kosovo". Later that day Serbian military convoys were seen withdrawing from the border. On 2 October, President Vučić called reports of a Serbian buildup "not fully accurate", saying that its troop presence in the border had decreased from 14,800 personnel in the previous year to 8,400 personnel a few days prior and finally to 4,400.

NATO announced that the organisation would increase its peacekeeping presence in Kosovo, adding that it would utilize additional soldiers from the United Kingdom. The German government expressed their support for strengthening the NATO-led peace mission KFOR and endorsed the deployment of additional numbers of its soldiers. Later, German Defense Minister Boris Pistorius declared that he had no immediate plans to send additional forces, stating that they are closely monitoring the situation and will "act swiftly if necessary". On 4 October, Romania announced its commitment to send approximately 100 soldiers to reinforce the KFOR peacekeeping mission.

On 2 October, Chairwoman of the Commission of the Kosovo Intelligence Agency Ganimete Musliu confirmed reports in a public statement that Serbia was engaged in the construction of a military base in the vicinity of Izvor near the Kosovo border. The confirmation was based on multiple evidence, including direct observations of military personnel in the area and drone footage that provided visual confirmation of the ongoing construction.

== Reactions ==
=== Kosovo ===
President Osmani asserted that the attack had been "orchestrated by Serbian criminal gangs" and characterised it as an assault on Kosovo's territorial integrity. Prime Minister Albin Kurti attributed the assailants as "heavily armed and heavily equipped, professionally trained and planned, politically supported, materially financed and logistically supported by Serbia". Kurti additionally assigned responsibility to "Serbian-state supported troops" for what he described as "terrorist attacks" and accused Serbia of plotting to stage a scenario similar to the Bosnian War in the 1990s that enabled the creation of a Serb-dominated entity within the country. Kurti urged Western nations to enact sanctions against Serbia, while Osmani asserted that Serbia persisted in asserting territorial claims and actively incite tensions, akin to what she described as a "Crimea model". Both Kurti and Dan Ilazi, head of research at the Kosovar Centre for Security Studies, noted that the weapons and equipment used by the attackers were unavailable in the open market and difficult to acquire without high-level connections, possibly within the Serbian government.

Kosovo Police General Director Gazmend Hoxha said the attack prompted the largest police operation in the country since the Kosovo War in 1999. The Jarinje and Brnjak border crossings between Kosovo and Serbia were closed due to the incident. On 29 September, Kosovar police raided five locations in three municipalities in the north of the country in connection with the attack, with reports saying several vehicles were confiscated. Serbian media reported that among the locations targeted were a hospital and a restaurant in Mitrovica.

A cousin of Afrim Bunjaku issued a statement confirming his death with the headline of the statement written in all capital letters reading "Dying for your Homeland is like being born again". Another relative of Bunjaku called Kurti to join the negotiations with Serbia and withdraw the police from the north of Kosovo to prevent further loss of life. The Serb List announced a three-day period of mourning "to mourn the loss of our fellow citizens", i.e. the militants, in Serb-majority municipalities against Kosovar laws which reserve such actions to the President and municipal authorities. On 26 September, residents of North Mitrovica and three other towns gathered and lit candles for the dead attackers. The Eparchy of Raška and Prizren of the Serbian Orthodox Church condemned the attack and violence in the monastery, expressing condolences to the families of the killed and wounded policemen.

In an EU-sponsored meeting in Brussels between Serbia and Kosovo held in October, Kosovo asked for Milan Radoicic to be handed over for a trial, guaranteed fair by the EU's rule of law mission in Kosovo monitoring it. Serbia rejected the idea.

=== Serbia ===
President Vučić condemned the killing of what he called an "Albanian police officer" and accused Prime Minister Kurti of being "the sole culprit" for the event and said that "the people fell for the provocations". He also claimed that the attackers were Kosovo Serbs who "did not want to endure Kurti's terror any longer". and said that Kurti's refusal to allow the formation of an Association of Serb Municipalities to guarantee autonomy for Kosovar Serbs fueled preexisting tensions. Defence Minister Miloš Vučević told RTS that the attackers were the latest in a long line of fighters who died "for freedom of Kosovo and freedom of Serbia", while several newspapers described them as "heroes" and said the country was collectively in "tears" over those killed in the attack.

Vučić claimed on television that the Security Intelligence Agency filmed Kosovar policemen letting a wounded Serb die without helping him. According to him, they laughed while watching him and one of the policemen said that it would not be a shame if the Serb died. He also claimed that private houses where elderly Serbs were living were fired at by the Kosovo police without reason, and that two Serbs were killed by sniper fire despite them being far away from anyone. Vučić later threatened to prosecute Kosovo police officers who he described as "cold blooded killers" and added that he did not "care what anyone in the world thinks about it".

Serbia declared a national day of mourning for 27 September for what it described as the "tragic events". However, Shqiprim Arifi, the mayor of Preševo in south Serbia, refused to hold a commemoration in the Albanian-majority city.

=== International ===
- – President Bajram Begaj strongly denounced the attack and characterised it as a "criminal and terrorist act". Prime Minister Edi Rama condemned the killing of Afrim Bunjaku and Serbia's decision to declare a day of mourning in honor of the attackers. Former Prime Minister Sali Berisha characterised the assault as an "orchestrated armed uprising instigated by Belgrade" and called for international action, urging the extradition of Serbian President Vučić to The Hague. Following the killing of Bunjaku, Foreign Minister Igli Hasani and Interior Minister Taulant Balla both participated in the memorial ceremonies held in Kosovo. On 2 October, the Parliament of Albania held a minute of silence in remembrance of Bunjaku. In Tirana, people convened at the Mother Teresa Square to commemorate Bunjaku by lighting candles.
- (Croatia) – Prime Minister Andrej Plenković strongly denounced the assault and criticized Serbia's declaration of a national day of mourning, stating that it "implies identification" with the incident. He further called upon Western nations and the EU to take appropriate measures in response to Serbia's actions. President Zoran Milanović classified the attack as a "terrorist act" and reaffirmed full support to Kosovo, while urging Serbia to provide clarifications regarding the attack.
- – European Union (EU) classified the incident as a terrorist assault. President of the European Council Charles Michel underscored that conflict between Kosovo and Serbia not only concerned the directly involved parties but also posed challenges for the wider region and Europe. EU's special envoy to the Balkans Miroslav Lajčák and EU foreign policy commissioner Josep Borrell condemned the assault. Both stated that the perpetrators must face legal consequences.
- (Germany) – Chancellor Olaf Scholz denounced the assault and deemed it an "unacceptable" act. Foreign Minister Annalena Baerbock highlighted the significance of addressing persistent conflicts and stabilising precarious conditions in the region. She specifically referenced the attack on the Kosovo Police and Serbian military's increased presence along the Kosovo border by a "highly armed terrorist group".
- – Prime Minister Dritan Abazović strongly condemned the assault, highlighting the potential for the situation to escalate into a more significant conflict with catastrophic repercussions for all parties involved. Rifat Fejzić, the head of the Islamic Community in Montenegro, likewise denounced the attack, emphasising the importance of a shared path towards the Balkans' integration into the EU.
- (North Macedonia) – Prime Minister Dimitar Kovačevski strongly condemnated the assault urging an immediate de-escalation of the situation. Foreign Minister Bujar Osmani similarly denounced the attack and underscored the need for a thorough investigation into the "act of violence". In addition, the head of the largest ethnic Albanian party Democratic Union for Integration Ali Ahmeti characterised the assault as an assault on "peace, stability, and security of the entire region". In Tetovo, people assembled to conduct a memorial ceremony in honor of Bunjaku.
- (Russia) – The Ministry of Foreign Affairs defended Serbia and blamed the Kosovar government for inciting the assault, adding that the bloodshed could spiral out of control.
- (Turkey) – Spokesperson of the Ministry of Foreign Affairs Tanju Bilgiç denounced the assault and underscored Turkish support for the ongoing dialogue process.
- (United States) – Secretary of State Antony Blinken strongly condemned the assault and urged both Kosovo and Serbia "to refrain from any actions or rhetoric which could further inflame tensions". He emphasised the imperative of holding the individuals responsible for this crime accountable through a transparent investigative procedure. Ambassador to Kosovo Jeff Hovenier asserted that the attack demonstrated a high degree of "coordination and sophistication", with indications of military training among the rebels, and the presence of a significant quantity of weapons, implying a serious intent to disrupt regional security. National Security Council spokesperson John Kirby said the attack was “well-coordinated and planned,” adding that the amount of weapons seized during the incident threatened the safety of Kosovo officials and international personnel, including NATO troops.
