= Northern Brigade =

North Kosovo Paramilitary Group

- Северна Бригада
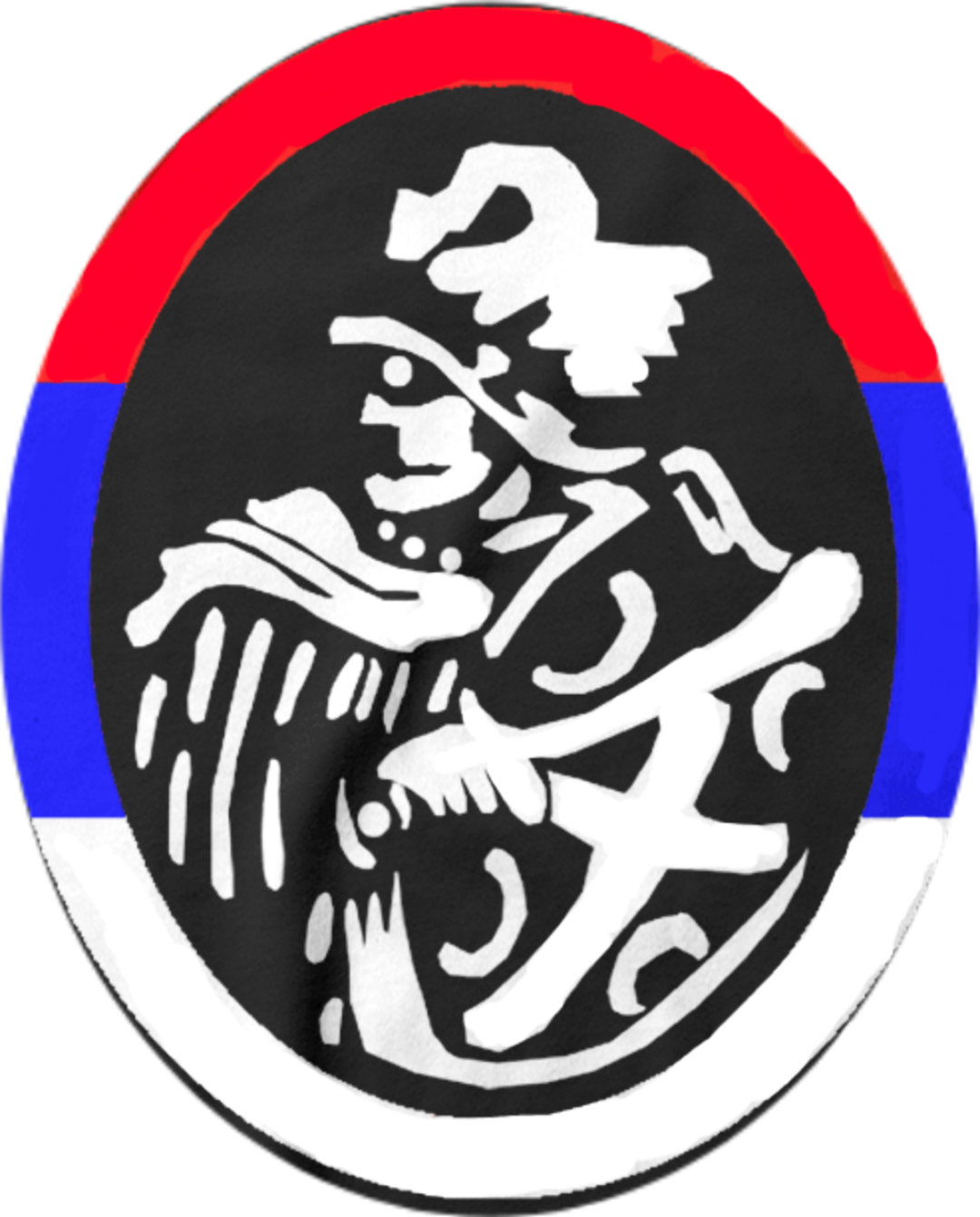
- Coat of arms of the Brigade
- Other name: Brigada Sever
- Dates active: 2022–present
- Active regions: Kosovo
- Ideology: Far right
- Wars: North Kosovo crisis (2022–2026): Northern Kosovo clashes; Banjska attack

Northern Brigade (Serbian Cyrillic: Северна Бригада) is a Serbian militant group in North Kosovo.

== North Kosovo crisis ==
In June 2023, the government of Kosovo designated two ethnic Serb groups, Severna Brigada (Northern Brigade) and Civilna Zaštita (Civil Defense), as terrorist entities, alleging they were recruiting and training members to carry out attacks on Kosovan infrastructure. This followed protests in the four northern municipalities in May due to the election of Albanian mayors in those municipalities after the Serb community had boycotted the elections. More than 90 KFOR soldiers were injured in the violent clashes.

In August 2022, Serbian President Aleksandar Vučić commented on the group. He asserted that the public was misinterpreting the graffiti and claimed that "Northern Brigade" actually referred to Red Star fans (as Red Star ultras sit in the North Stand of the Rajko Mitić Stadium, colloquially making them "the brigade from the north").

It is unclear when the Severna Brigada was established or how it operates. In August 2022, graffiti signed by the group appeared on the streets of North Kosovo.

Some of its members are believed to have taken part in the September 2023 attack in the village of Banjska where three militants and one Kosovo police officer was killed.
