= National Security Council coordinator for strategic communications =

Position in the US National Security Council

The National Security Council Coordinator for Strategic Communications is a U.S. government official operating within the National Security Council. Similar to a press secretary or public affairs officer, this position is responsible for coordinating "interagency efforts to explain United States policy", often through public briefings and media interviews. Like the National Security Advisor they are appointed directly by the President and do not require Senate approval.

== History ==
On May 20, 2022, President Biden named John Kirby as the National Security Council Coordinator for Strategic Communications. Kirby is the first to occupy this position, which reports to the National Security Advisor. Prior to his appointment as Coordinator for Strategic Communications, Kirby had been rumored as a potential replacement for the outgoing White House Press Secretary.

While cabinet-level departments typically employ their own public affairs staff, the unique role of the National Security Council within the United States is reflected in the range of topics on which the Coordinator for Strategic Communications has been asked to comment, which include abortion policy within the Department of Defense, the provision of weapons to Ukraine, and the impact of the 2023 Chinese balloon incident on foreign relations of the United States. The Coordinator for Strategic Communications has appeared in briefings organized by the State Department and White House.

== List of National Security Council Coordinators for Strategic Communications ==
Tenure	Coordinator	President	National Security Advisor
2022–20 Jan 2025	John Kirby	Joe Biden	Jake Sullivan

== Links ==
Appearances by current Coordinator for Strategic Communications on C-SPAN
