= Zvečan =

Zvečan: Zveçan or Zveçani (Albanian) Zvečan or Звечан (Serbian)
- Town and municipality
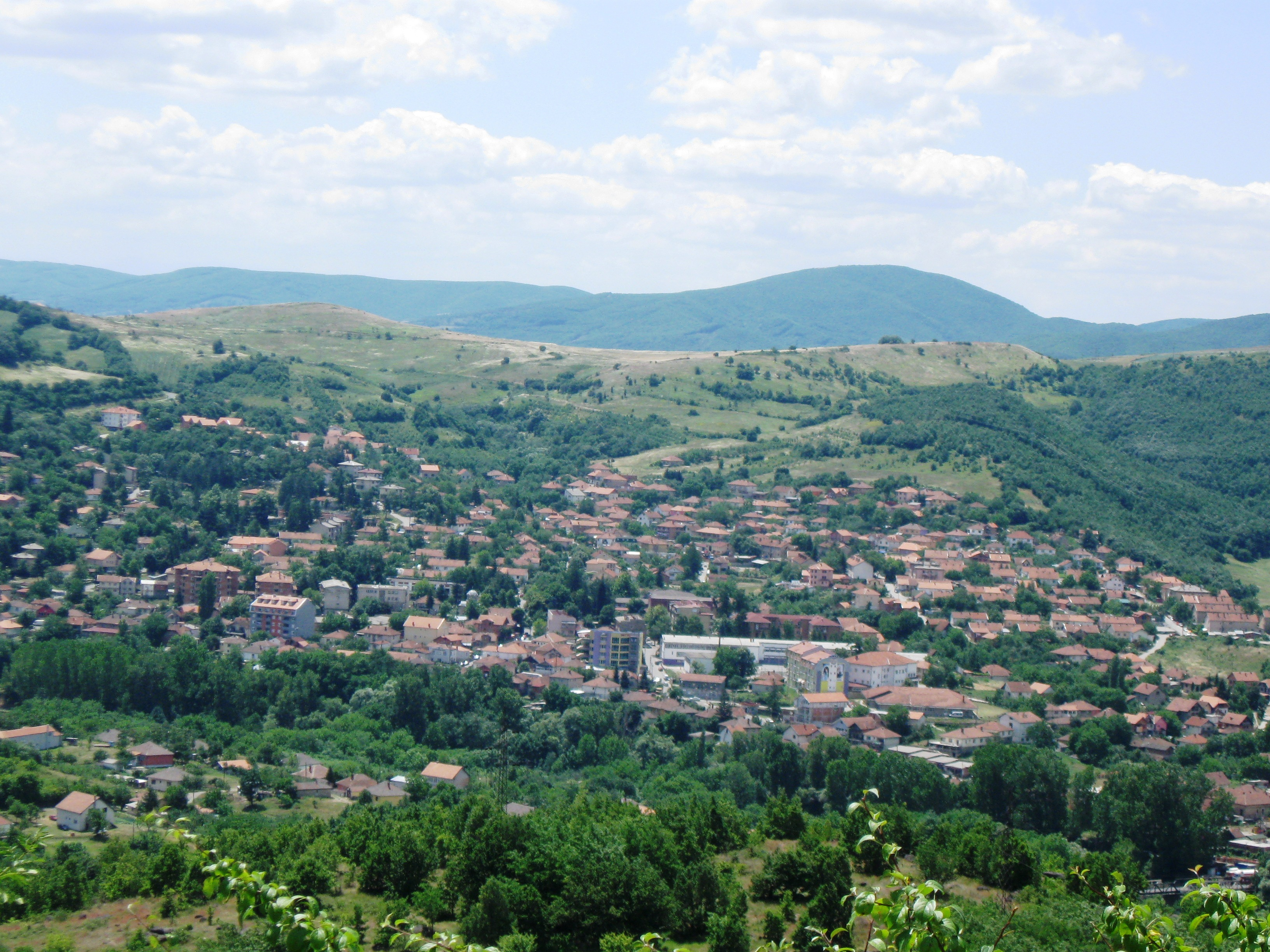
- Panorama of Zvečan

- Emblem
- Interactive map of Zvečan
- Location within Kosovo
- Coordinates: 42°54′N 20°50′E
- Country: Kosovo
- District: Mitrovica
- Settlements: 36

Government
  - Mayor: Dragiša Milović (SL)

Area
  - Total: 122 km^{2} (47 sq mi)
- Elevation: 461 m (1,512 ft)

Population (2015)
  - Total: 16,650
  - Density: 136/km^{2} (353/sq mi)
- Time zone: UTC+1 (CET)
  - Summer (DST): UTC+2 (CEST)
- Postal code: 43000
- Area code: +383(0)28
- Vehicle registration: 02
- Climate: Cfb
- Website: Official site

Zvečan (Serbian Cyrillic: Звечан) or Zveçan (Albanian definite form: Zveçani) is a town and municipality located in the Mitrovica District in Kosovo. As of 2015, it has a population of 16,650 inhabitants. It covers an area of 122 km^{2} (47 sq mi), and consists of a town and 35 villages.

Zvečan is a part of North Kosovo, a region with an ethnic Serb majority. According to the 2013 Brussels Agreement, the municipality should become a part of the Community of Serb Municipalities once they are established.

== History ==
The town of Zvečan is located near Mitrovica. It was mentioned for the first time in connection with the border clashes between the Serbs and Byzantines between 1091 and 1094. There is also an inscription that Grand Prince Stefan Nemanja, after the victory over the Byzantines in 1170, ordered that a prayer for the successful outcome of the battle be held in the church of St George at Zvečan.

In the 13th and 14th centuries Zvečan was one of the royal residences of the Serbian court. Queen Theodora died there in December 1322, and nine years later her husband, Stefan Uroš III was imprisoned and strangled there.

First, the Musić, then the Vojinović noble family, held the fortified city and region during the Serbian Empire of Uroš V (r. 1355–1371). As imperial power collapsed Zvečan was in a disputed zone being held by nobleman Miloš Pović in 1370 but claimed by Nikola Altomanović.

In 1389, after the Battle of Kosovo, it was integrated into the Ottoman Empire and later became part of the Sanjak of Novi Pazar.

On 26 May 2023, Kosovo Police took control of the municipal buildings of four Serb majority municipalities in the north of Kosovo.

In September 2023, Banjska attack was carried by Serb militants against Kosovo Police in a village of the municipality of Zvečan, named Banjska. During the fighting, one Kosovar police officer and several Serb militants were killed. The attackers sought refuge within Banjska Monastery, which was eventually retaken by the Kosovo Police. During this operation, a significant cache of weaponry was confiscated.

== Demographics ==
Historical population
Year	Pop.	±% p.a.
1981	8,675	—
1991	10,030	+1.46%
2015	16,650	+2.13%

According to the 2011 estimations by the Government of Kosovo, Zvečan has 1,838 households and 7,481 inhabitants. In 2015 report by OSCE, the population of Zvečan municipality stands at 16,650 inhabitants.

=== Ethnic groups ===
The majority of Zvečan municipality is composed of Kosovo Serbs with around 16,000 inhabitants (95.1%). Also, there are 500 Kosovo Albanians and 300 inhabitants of other ethnicity. About 3,750 Kosovo Serbs are located in the municipality as Internally displaced persons (IDPs) as well as 250 refugees from Croatia. Most of Kosovo Albanians live in the villages of Boletin (Boljetin), Lipë/Kelmend (Lipa) and Zhazhë (Žaža).

The ethnic composition of the municipality of Zvečan, including IDPs:

Ethnic group	2015 est.
Serbs	15,850
Albanians	500
Bosniaks, Romani, Gorani	300
Others	-
Total	16,650

== Economy ==
The largest employer in Zvečan is the lead and zinc melting factory "Trepča". Its large smokestack is with 306 meters the tallest structure in Kosovo. Due to the serious environmental pollution from the factory, however, UN and KFOR shut it down and the only ongoing operation is alloy production for batteries and battery recycling. Once employing up to 4,000, the very low operations of "Trepča" has had a devastating effect on the local economy. Today, in the municipality only about 500 people are working at 60 small private companies and 150 shops.

== Culture and education ==
The Faculty of Arts, part of the University of Priština at North Mitrovica, is situated at Zvečan.

Zvečan has hosted annually two international music festivals: The North City, Jazz & Blues Festival, and international rock festival Overdrive, as well as international art colony Sokolica and children song festival Cvrkuti sa Ibra (Chirrups from the Ibar River).

The Zvečan Fortress and Sokolica Monastery, both from the Middle Ages, have been located in the Zvečan area.

== Gallery ==
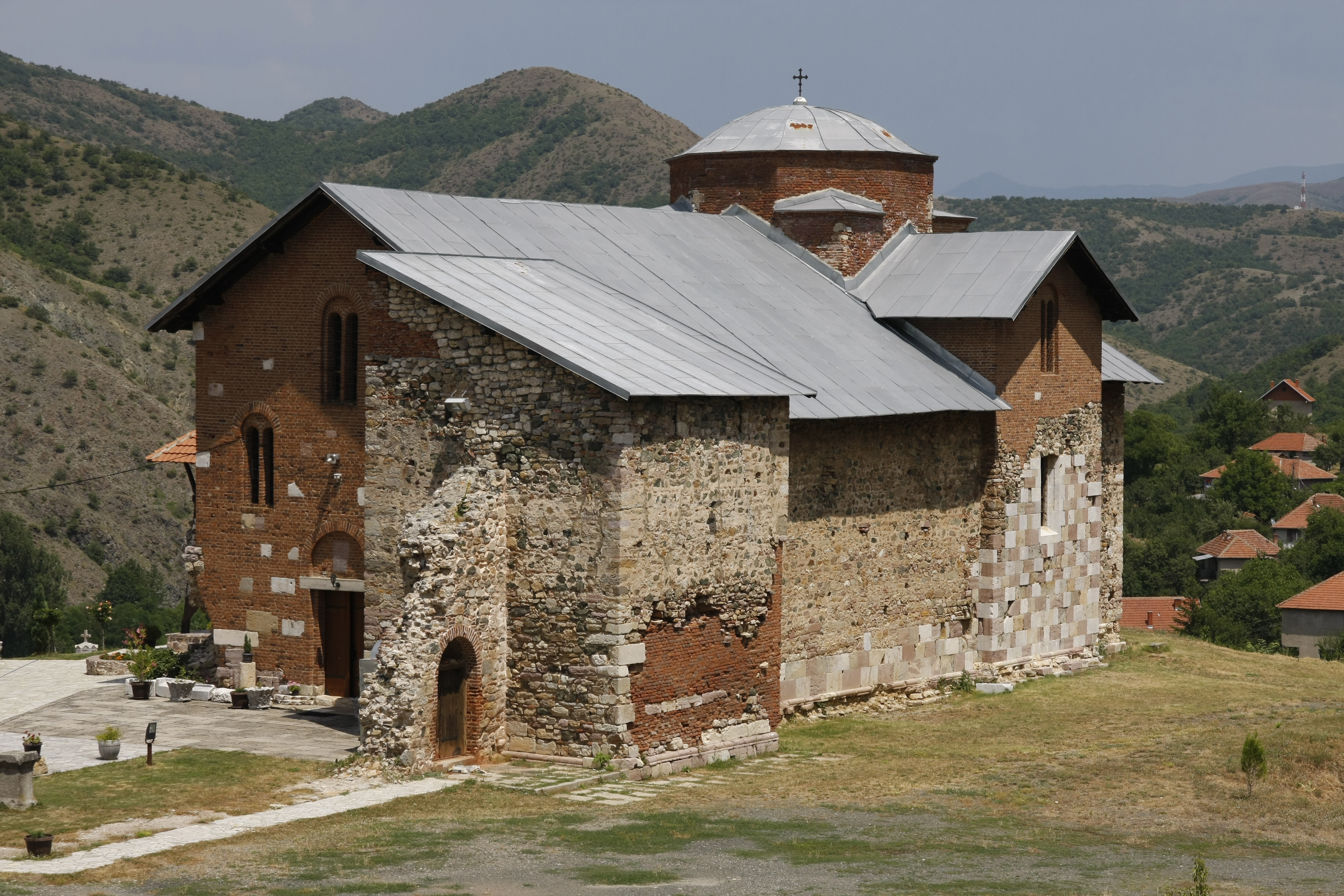
Banjska monastery

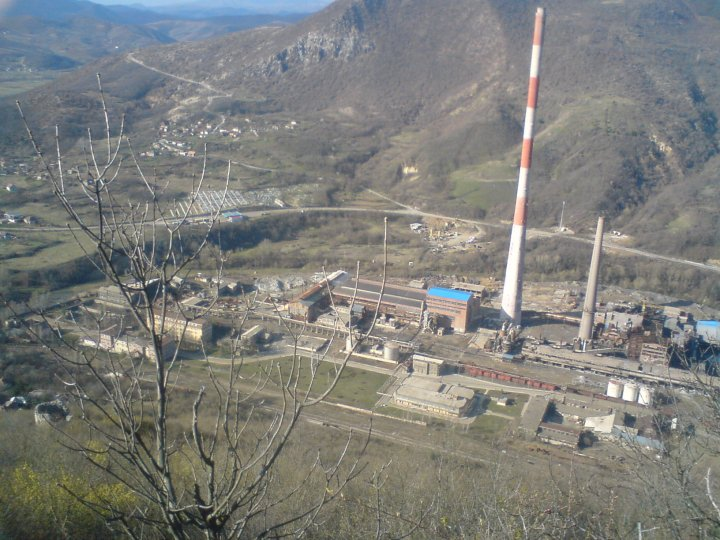
Trepča Mines

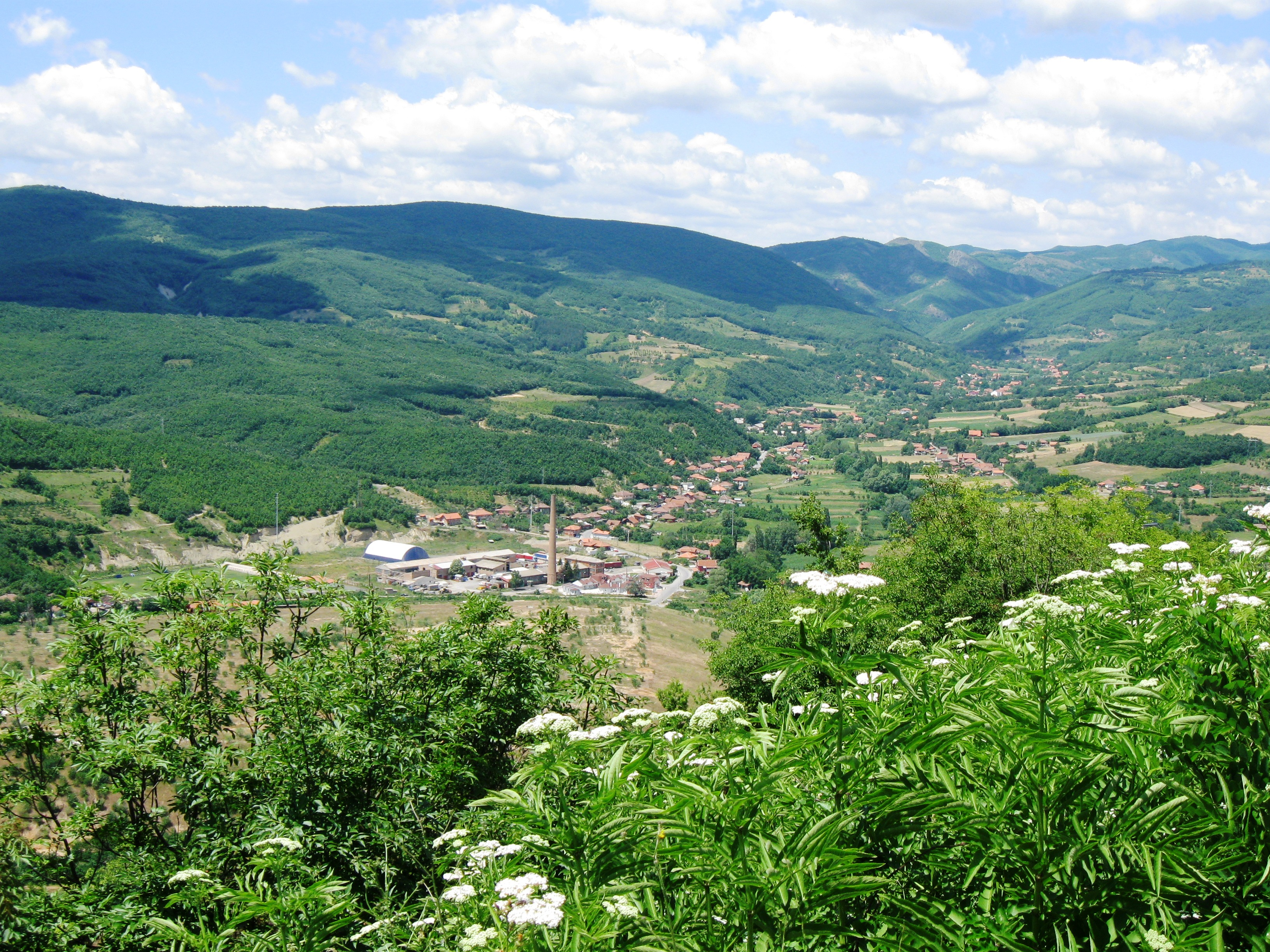
Zvečan landscape

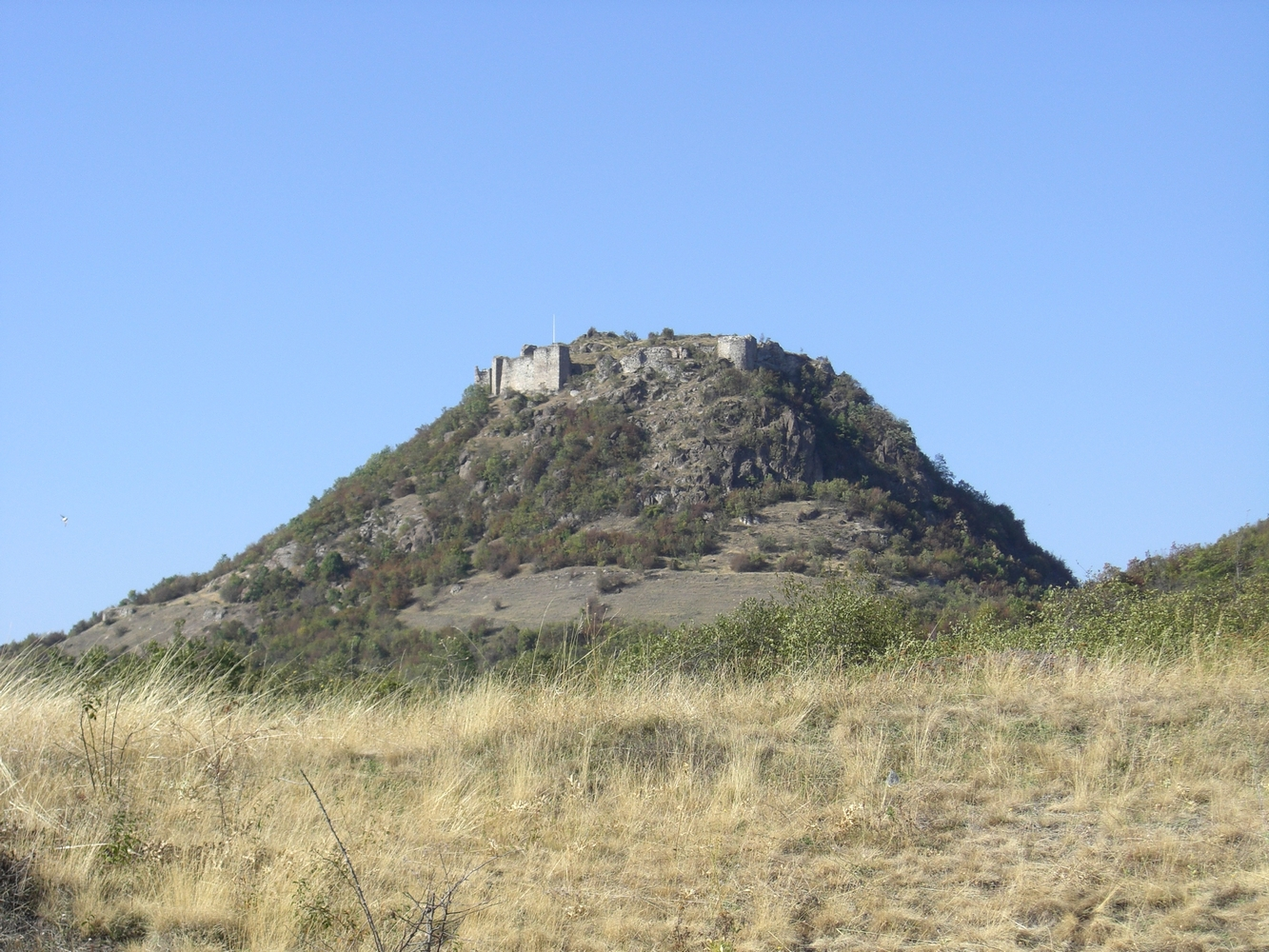
Zvečan Fortress

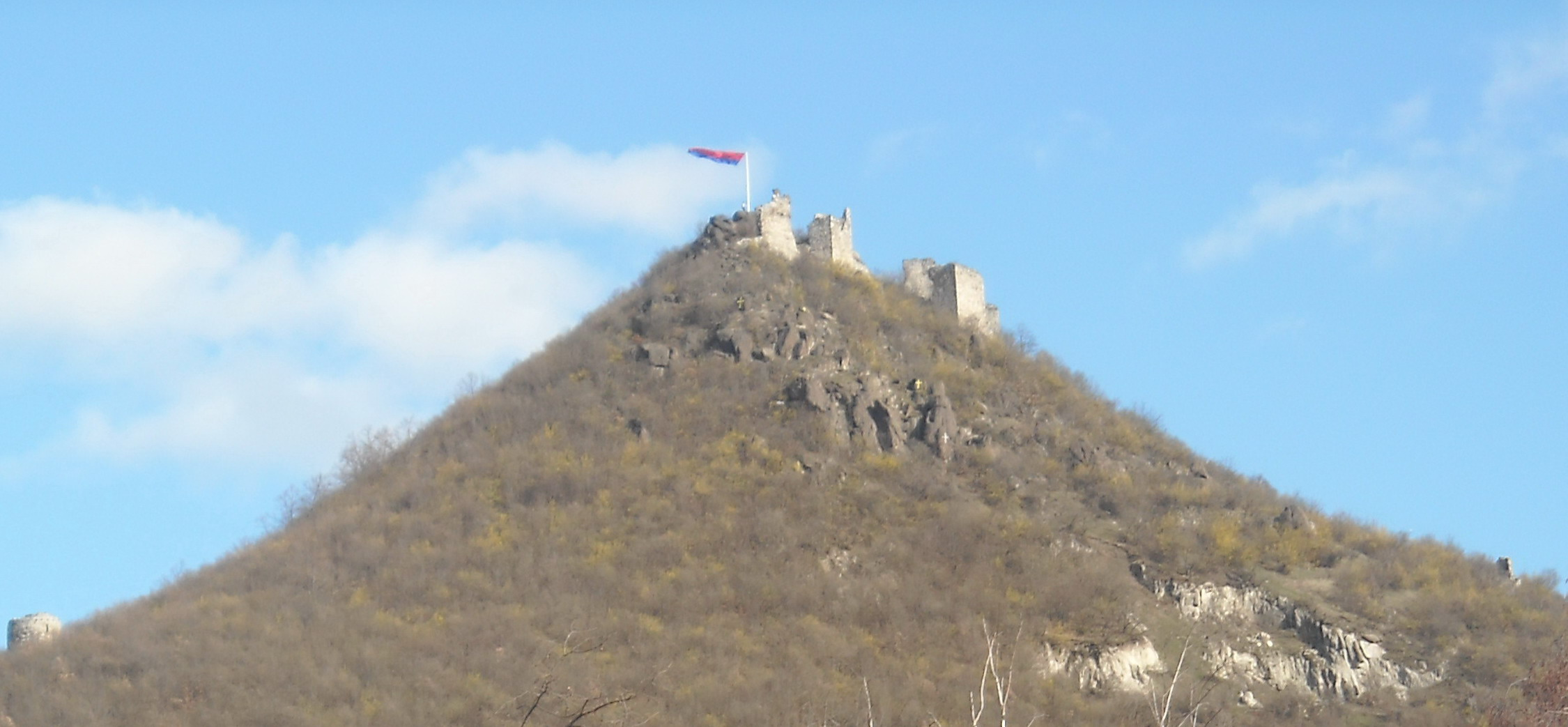
Zvečan Fortress

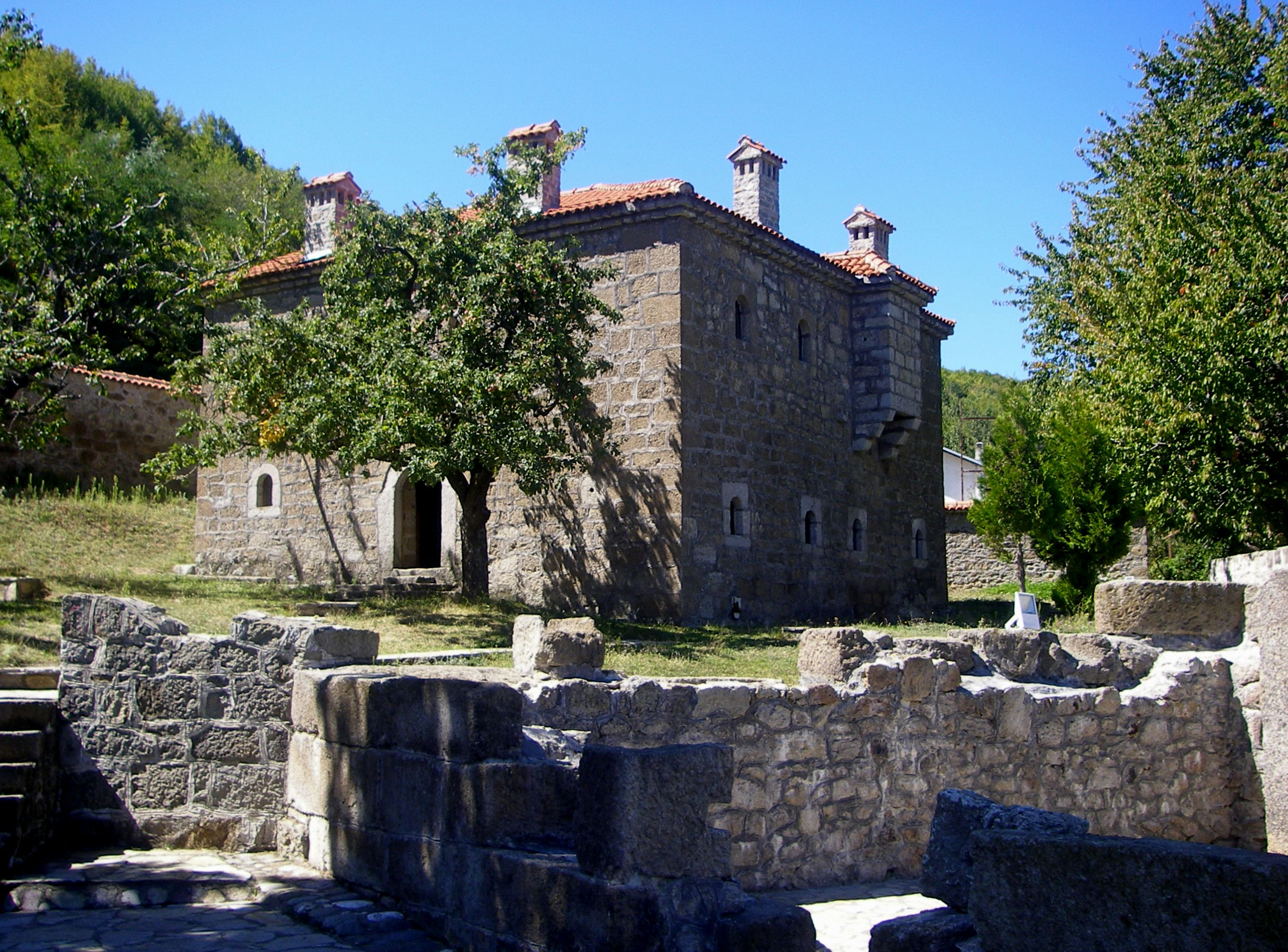
Isa Boletini Complex

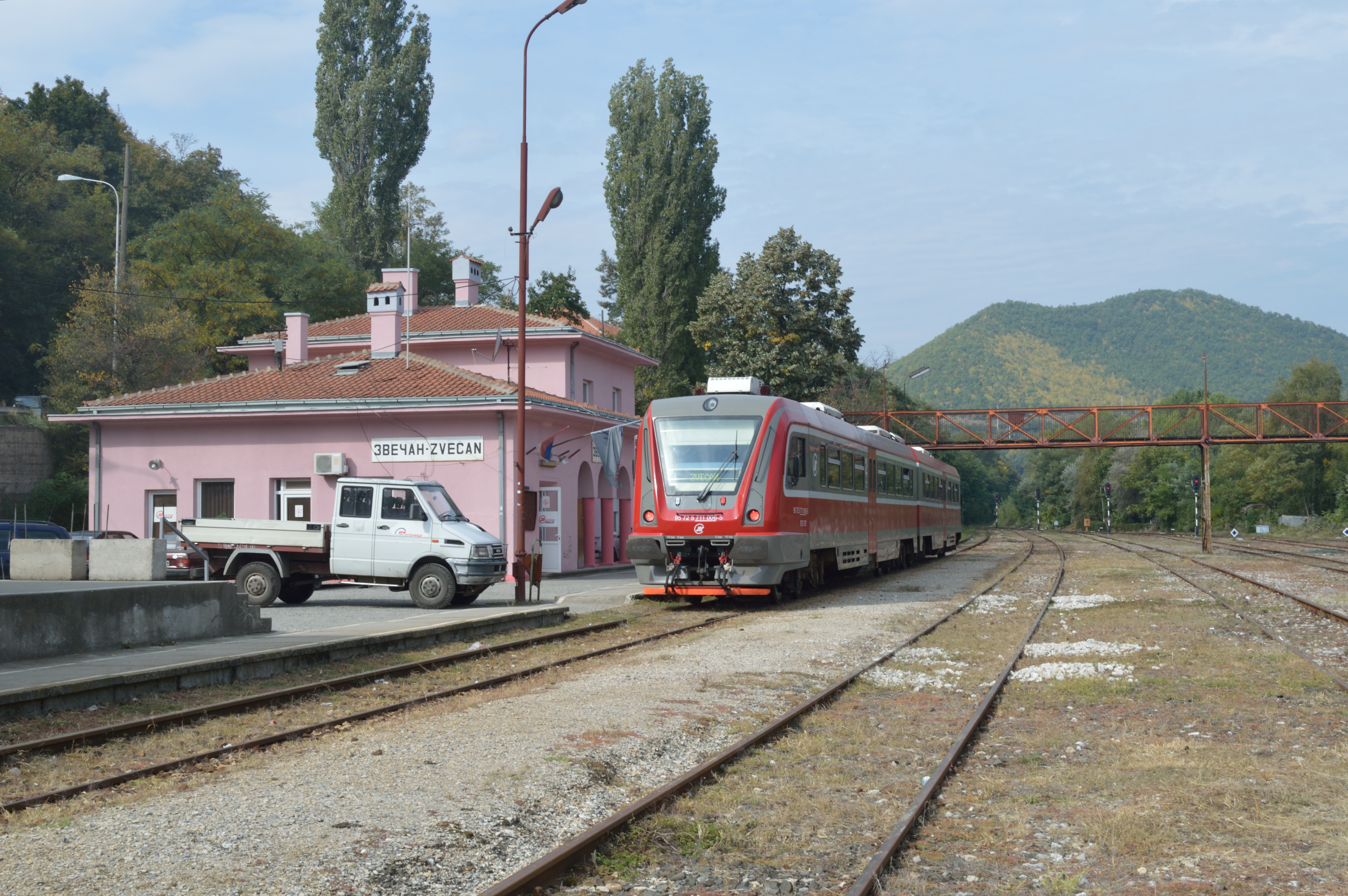
Zvečan Railway Station

== See also ==
- North Kosovo
- Community of Serb Municipalities
- District of Mitrovica
