= Kosovo Intelligence Agency =

Civilian intelligence agency of Kosovo

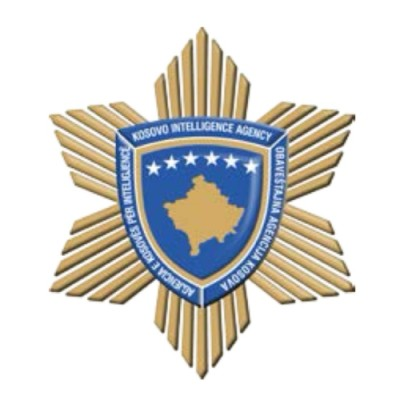

Agency overview
- Formed: February 4, 2009
- Preceding agency: Kosovo Intelligence Group
- Headquarters: Pristina, Kosovo
- Employees: Classified
- Agency executive: Petrit Ajeti, Director
- Website: www.aki-rks.org

The Kosovo Intelligence Agency (KIA; Albanian: Agjencia e Kosovës për Inteligjencë, abbr. AKI) is a civilian intelligence agency of Kosovo responsible for providing national security intelligence to senior Kosovo policymakers.

== Mission ==
AKI mission is to identify threats detrimental to the security of Kosovo. A threat to the security of Kosovo shall in any event be considered a threat against the territorial integrity, integrity of the institutions, the constitutional order, the economic stability and development, as well as threats against global security detrimental to Kosovo.

== Director ==
Name	From	Until
Bashkim Smakaj	2009	January 2015
Agron Selimaj	January 2015	27 January 2017
Driton Gashi	8 February 2017	10 April 2018
Shpend Maxhuni	20 April 2018	6 November 2019
Kreshnik Gashi	25 November 2019	22 December 2020
Petrit Ajeti	15 April 2021	Incumbent
