= Banjska Monastery =

14th-century Serbian Orthodox monastery near Zvečan, Kosovo

Coordinates: 42°58′17″N 20°46′57″E

Banjska monastery
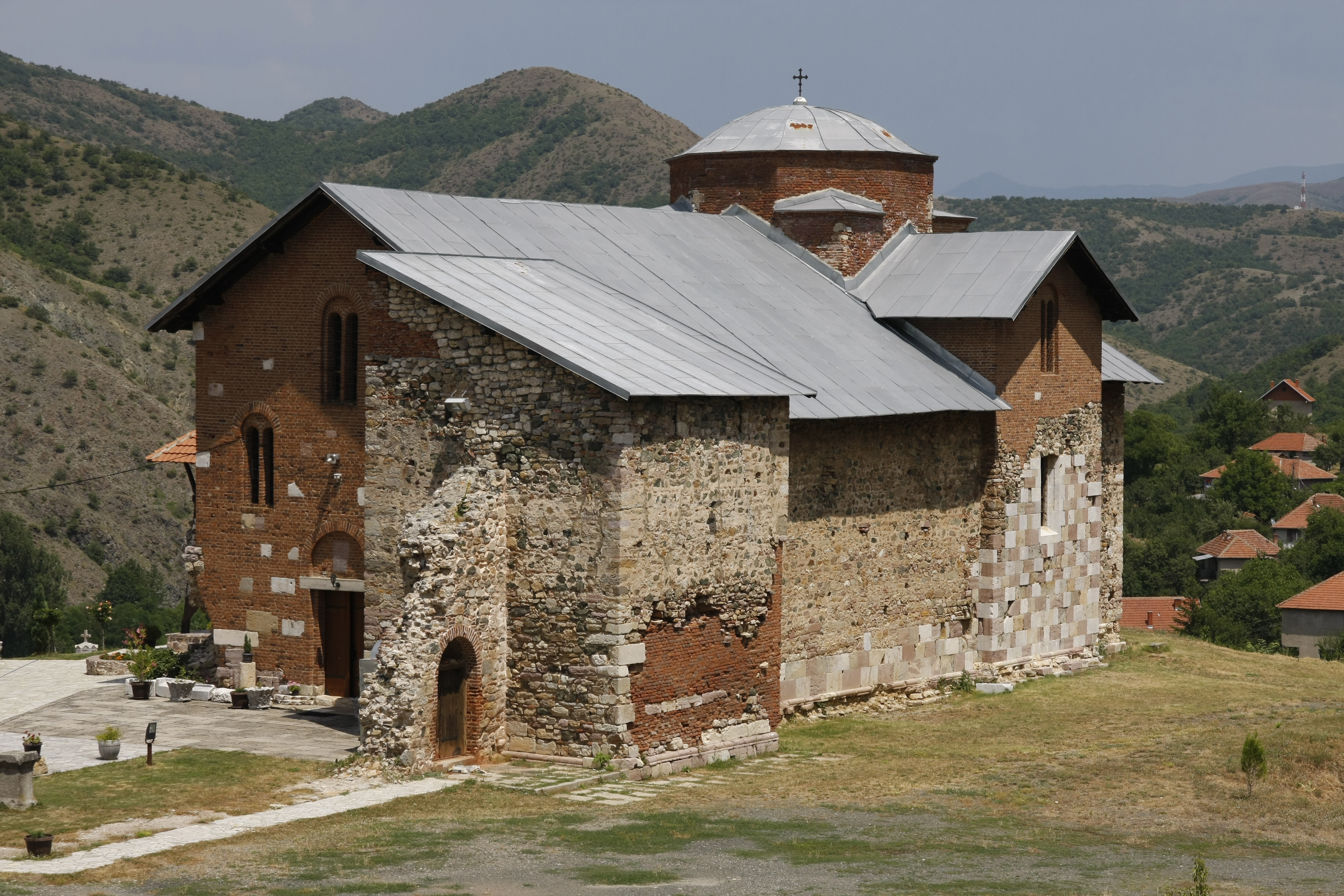
- View of the Banjska monastery
- Interactive map of Banjska monastery

Monastery information
- Full name: Манастир Светог архиђакона Стефана - Бањска
- Order: Serbian Orthodox
- Established: 14th-century 1317 (reestablished in 2004)
- Disestablished: 16th century
- Dedication: Saint Archdeacon Stephen
- Diocese: Eparchy of Raška and Prizren

People
- Founder: King of Serbia Stefan Milutin

Architecture
- Heritage designation: Cultural monument of Exceptional Importance
- Designated date: 26 August 1947

Site
- Location: Hill near Zvečan
- Country: Kosovo
- Public access: Limited

The Banjska Monastery (Serbian: Манастир Бањска, romanized: Manastir Banjska; Albanian: Manastiri i Banjskës) is a Serbian Orthodox monastery founded in the 14th-century by King of Serbia Stefan Milutin in Banjska village near Zvečan, Kosovo.

The current head of the monastery is Archpriest Danilo Domazetović, with the brotherhood at his head since February 17, 2010. The monastery celebrated its 7th centenary in August 2013.

The monastery was the site of Banjska attack, an attack carried by Serb militants against Kosovo Police on 24 September 2023.

== History ==
The monastery, along with the Church of St Stephen, was built between 1313 and 1317, founded by Serbian King Stefan Milutin, one of the most powerful rulers of his time and of the Nemanjić dynasty. Milutin built the church as his mausoleum (burial place), and it is where he was first laid to rest in 1321. However, following the Battle of Kosovo (1389), his body was moved to Trepča and then in 1460 to Sofia (Bulgaria), where it lies to this day.

The monumental building with its church, library, monks' quarters and "imperial palace" began to fall into disrepair very early. At the beginning of the 15th century, a fire destroyed the library and in the second half of the same century, the monastery was probably abandoned. Benedikt Kuprešić, a traveller, mentioned that the monastery was razed to the ground in the 16th century on the orders of the Ottoman Sultan, as Christians who had fled Ottoman tyranny were gathering in it.

St Stephen's, almost totally destroyed, was turned into a mosque in the 19th century and served as such until World War I. The first conservation activity was carried out in 1939 and again in 1990 when the church was partly rebuilt. The monastery is one of the few for which the founding charter has been preserved; it was granted a large estate at its founding, of 75 villages and 8 pastures. As the complex was built as the final resting place of a king, the bishopric was "upgraded" to a stavropegial monastery - roughly translated, an Imperial monastery, fourth by rank in the state (after Studenica, Mileševa and Sopoćani).

The building works were led by Archbishop Danilo II, at that time a bishop, later Serbian Archbishop, who was a close confidant to the king. According to medieval sources, as well as an oral tradition, Banjska was one of the most beautiful Serbian monasteries, built in the Raška architectural style, which was used for all royal mausoleums, from Stefan Nemanja's Studenica monastery to Emperor Dušan's Monastery of the Holy Archangels. The monastery was declared a Monument of Culture of Exceptional Importance in 1990, and was protected by the Republic of Serbia.

On 24 September 2023, the monastery was stormed by a group of 30 armed Serbs who engaged in a violent confrontation with Kosovo Police and barricaded themselves inside, after a Kosovan officer was ambushed and killed hours earlier. After hours, the Kosovo Forces successfully entered the monastery and apprehended the Serb militants ultimately bringing an end to the tense situation.

== Documentary film ==
- Banjska — scientific reconstruction, a documentary TV film from the series " Witnesses of the Centuries " produced by RTB, was filmed in 1989, based on a script by Dr. Marija Šuput, directed by Milan Knežević, and the music was composed by Zoran Hristić.

== See also ==
- List of Serbian Orthodox monasteries
- Banjska attack
