= Banjska (village) =

Settlement in Kosovo

Banjska Бањска Banjskë
- Village
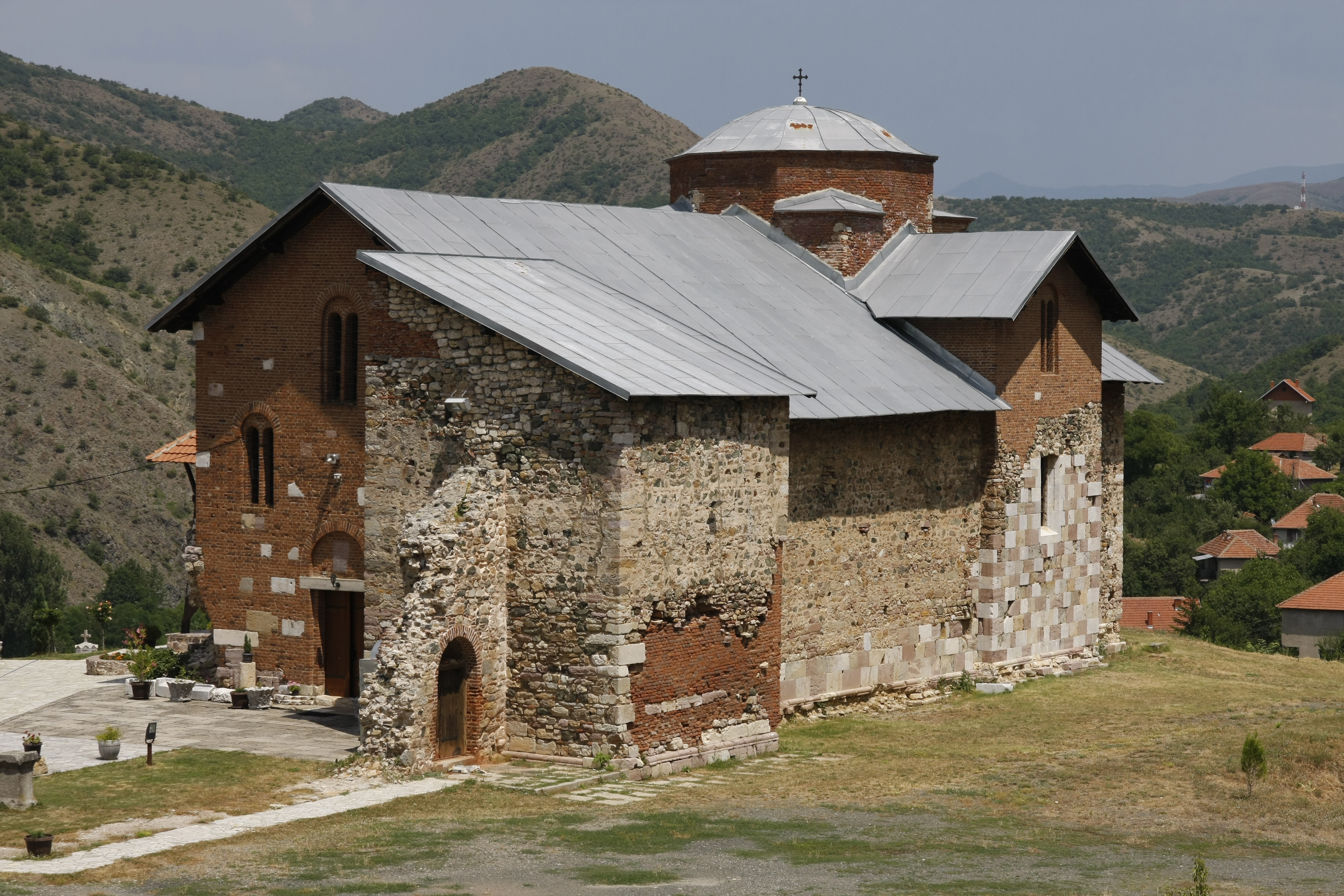
- Banjska Monastery
- Interactive map of Banjska
- Location within Kosovo
- Coordinates: 42°58′24″N 20°46′51″E
- Country: Kosovo
- District: Mitrovica
- Municipality: Zvečan

Population (2011)
  - Total: 465
- Time zone: UTC+1 (CET)
  - Summer (DST): UTC+2 (CEST)

Banjska (Serbian Cyrillic: Бањска; Albanian: Banjskë or Bajë e Mitrovicës) is a village located in Zvečan in northern Kosovo. It has a population of 465 inhabitants as of 2011.

== History ==
Before 1918, Banjska had a Muslim Albanian majority. In 1891, 60 houses were inhabited by Albanians and 73 houses in 1903. They migrated to the city of Mitrovica or Turkey in Evrencik after 1918. After 1923, Serbs settled in the village.

== Places of interest ==
The Banjska monastery is nearby. The village is also known for its hot springs, which can reach 50°C, making them the hottest in Kosovo.

== Events ==
In 1999 a RTV transmitter was damaged.

During the Kosovan parliamentary election, 2010, a polling station was surrounded by an angry mob and access to the village was blocked.

=== 2023 attack ===
On 24 September 2023, an armed group of about 30 Serb men attacked Kosovo Police after blockading the village, shooting and killing one officer and injuring another, before barricading themselves in the Banjska monastery. Three Serb militants were killed by Kosovo Police. The attack was classified as a terrorist attack by Kosovo and the European Union.

== Notable people ==
- Mehmet Aliu (sq), Albanian imam and landowner, also known by the name Hoxhë Banjska
