= Mortal Kombat 2 (disambiguation) =

Mortal Kombat II is an arcade fighting video game first released in 1993.

Mortal Kombat 2 may also refer to:

- Mortal Kombat II (film), a film based on the Mortal Kombat franchise, the second film in the 2020s Mortal Kombat film series
- Mortal Kombat volume 2 or issue 2, several different books; see List of Mortal Kombat media

== See also ==
- Mortal Kombat Annihilation, a 1997 martial arts action movie, the sequel to Mortal Kombat
- Mortal (disambiguation)
- Kombat (disambiguation)
- Mortal Kombat (disambiguation)
