= Mark I =

Mark I or Mark 1 often refers to the first version of a weapon or military vehicle, and is sometimes used in a similar fashion in civilian product development. In some instances, the Arabic numeral "1" is substituted for the Roman numeral "I". "Mark", meaning "model" or "variant", can itself be abbreviated "Mk." It may refer to:

== Military and weaponry ==
- Mark I tank (1916), the first tank to be used in combat
- Mk 1 grenade, the first American-designed grenade used by American forces in World War I
- Mark I trench knife, a combat knife carried by US forces after World War I
- Supermarine Spitfire Mk I (1938), Royal Air Force fighter aircraft
- Mark I Fire Control Computer, United States Navy fire control computer used in World War II surface ships
- Mark I Nuclear Weapon (Little Boy), first nuclear weapon used in combat
- The Mark I NAAK, an auto-injector carried by military personnel for use in case of nerve agent attacks
- Patrol Boat, River ("Mark I PBR", 1966), 31-foot version of the US Navy riverine patrol boat
- Mk 1 Underwater Defense Gun, 1970s United States Navy dart-shooting underwater firearm
- Mark 1, counter-drone micromissile developed by Frankenburg Technologies

== Vehicles ==
- Mk I Mini (1959-1967); the original Austin Mini and Morris Mini-Minor from British Motor Corporation
- British Railways Mark 1, the first standardised passenger-rated rolling stock (carriages or cars), introduced on British Railways in the 1950s
- UTDC ICTS Mark I, rolling stock used by the Vancouver SkyTrain and Detroit People Mover, as well as formerly in Line 3 Scarborough
- Aptera Mk-1, a prototype 3-wheeled autocycle car replacement
- Cooper Mark I, a sports car
- Cooper-Bristol, aka Cooper Mk. I, a Formula Two racing car
- Cooper-Bristol T20/25, aka Cooper Mk. 1, a sports car

== Computers ==
- Harvard Mark I (1944), an early automatic digital computer made by IBM
- Colossus Mark I (1944), a British computer used to crack military codes
- Manchester Mark 1 (1949), an early Autocode computer
- Ferranti Mark 1 (1951), an early computer based on the Manchester Mark 1
- MARK 1 or Perceptron (1959-1960), a neural net computer designed by Frank Rosenblatt at Cornell University

== Other technologies ==
- Mark I (detector), a particle detector at Stanford Linear Accelerator Center from 1973 to 1977
- GE BWR Mark I boiling water reactor, a Generation II nuclear reactor
- The Lovell Telescope, called the Mark I between 1961 and 1970, then the Mark IA between 1971 and 1987

== Other uses ==
- Mark 1 or Mark I, the first chapter of the Gospel of Mark in the New Testament of the Christian Bible
- Patriarch Mark I, retronym for Mark the Apostle as Patriarch of Alexandria
- "Mark I" or "Mark 1", the working title of "Tomorrow Never Knows," a song by the Beatles
- Visual inspection, sometimes called "Mark I Eyeball" in US Military slang since the 1950s
- Mesa Boogie Mark I (1969), an electric guitar amplifier
- Mark I, first version of Iron Man's armor
- Mark I line-up of rock band Deep Purple, the band's original line-up, with Rod Evans, Ritchie Blackmore, Jon Lord, Nick Simper and Ian Paice

== See also ==
- Mark One (disambiguation), including Mk.one
- MK1 (disambiguation)
- MKI (disambiguation)
