= Mortal Kombat 1 (disambiguation) =

Mortal Kombat 1 is a 2023 video game.

Mortal Kombat 1 may also refer to:

- Mortal Kombat (1992 video game), the first video game in the Mortal Kombat video game main-line series
- Mortal Kombat (1995 film), a 1995 film
- Mortal Kombat (2021 film), a 2021 film
- Mortal Kombat volume 1 or issue 1, several different books; see List of Mortal Kombat media

== See also ==
- Mortal Kombat (2011 video game), a reboot of the Mortal Kombat video game series
- Kombat (disambiguation)
- Mortal (disambiguation)
- Mortal Kombat (disambiguation)
