= Combat (disambiguation) =

Combat is purposeful violent conflict.

Combat may also refer to:

== Military ==
- Combat (French Resistance), a large organisation of French resistance fighters during World War II
- Combat (newspaper), a French Resistance publication founded during World War II
- Kombat (military rank), a rank in the Red Army until the end of 1930s
- Kombat (photograph), a 1942 World War II photograph by Max Alpert

== Entertainment ==
=== Music ===
- Combat Records, an independent New York record label, predominantly of punk rock and heavy metal groups
- "Combat", by Heaven Shall Burn from the album Invictus (Iconoclast III)
- "Combat", by Deftones from the album Saturday Night Wrist
- "Combat", by Flobots from the album Fight with Tools

=== Television ===
- Combat!, an American television program that originally aired on ABC from 1962 until 1967
- "Combat" (Torchwood), an episode from the British science fiction drama Torchwood

=== Video games ===
- Telstar Combat!, an early dedicated video game console by Coleco in 1977 featuring battling tanks
- Combat (Atari 2600), a battling tanks and planes video game for the Atari 2600 from 1977
- Combat 2, a cancelled Atari 2600 game
- Combat (1985 video game), a light gun arcade shooting game made by Exidy in 1985

=== Films ===
- The Combat (1916 film), a lost silent film drama
- The Combat (1926 film), an American silent western film

=== Role-playing games ===
- Combat (World of Darkness), a 1996 supplement for the role-playing game World of Darkness

== Other uses ==
- Aeros Combat, a hang glider
- ALFA Combat, a Czech-made semi-automatic pistol
- Combat (horse), a Thoroughbred racehorse
- Combat (juggling), a competitive game played by jugglers
- ComBat, Dennis Lillee's notorious aluminum cricket bat
- Combat trousers, shorts, or "combats", also known as cargo pants
- Tanfoglio T95 or Combat, a semi-automatic pistol
- The Combat: Woman Pleading for the Vanquished, a painting by William Etty

== See also ==
- Kombat (disambiguation)
- Fight (disambiguation)
