= Dartz =

Latvian designer, manufacturer, and seller of armored vehicles

Dartz Motor Company
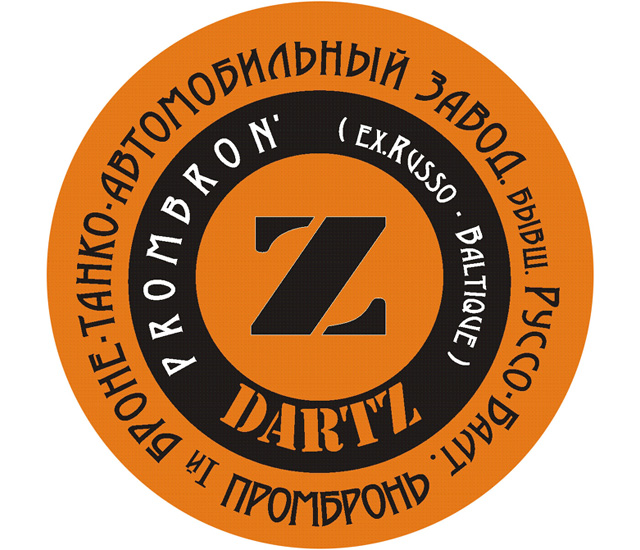
- Predecessor: Russo-Balt
- Headquarters: Riga, Latvia
- Products: Dartz Prombron
- Owner: Leonard F. Yankelovich
- Parent: Dartz Grupa OÜ
- Website: dartzmotorz.com

Dartz Motorz Company is a privately held Latvia-based company, subsidiary of Estonian corporation Dartz Grupa OÜ, that designs, manufactures, and sells high performance armored vehicles. The company constituted itself from a renovated former Russo-Balt factory in Riga, Latvia.

== Product lineup ==
In 2009, Dartz attained notoriety with its Prombron model, in part because it was originally available in upholstered leather made from the foreskins of whale penises, which the company subsequently dropped after the controversy was publicized.

The Prombron came in nine distinct models: Iron Diamond, Iron Xtal, Monaco Red Diamond Edition, Black Dragon, Black Russian, Gold Russian, Aladeen, White Horse, and Monako.

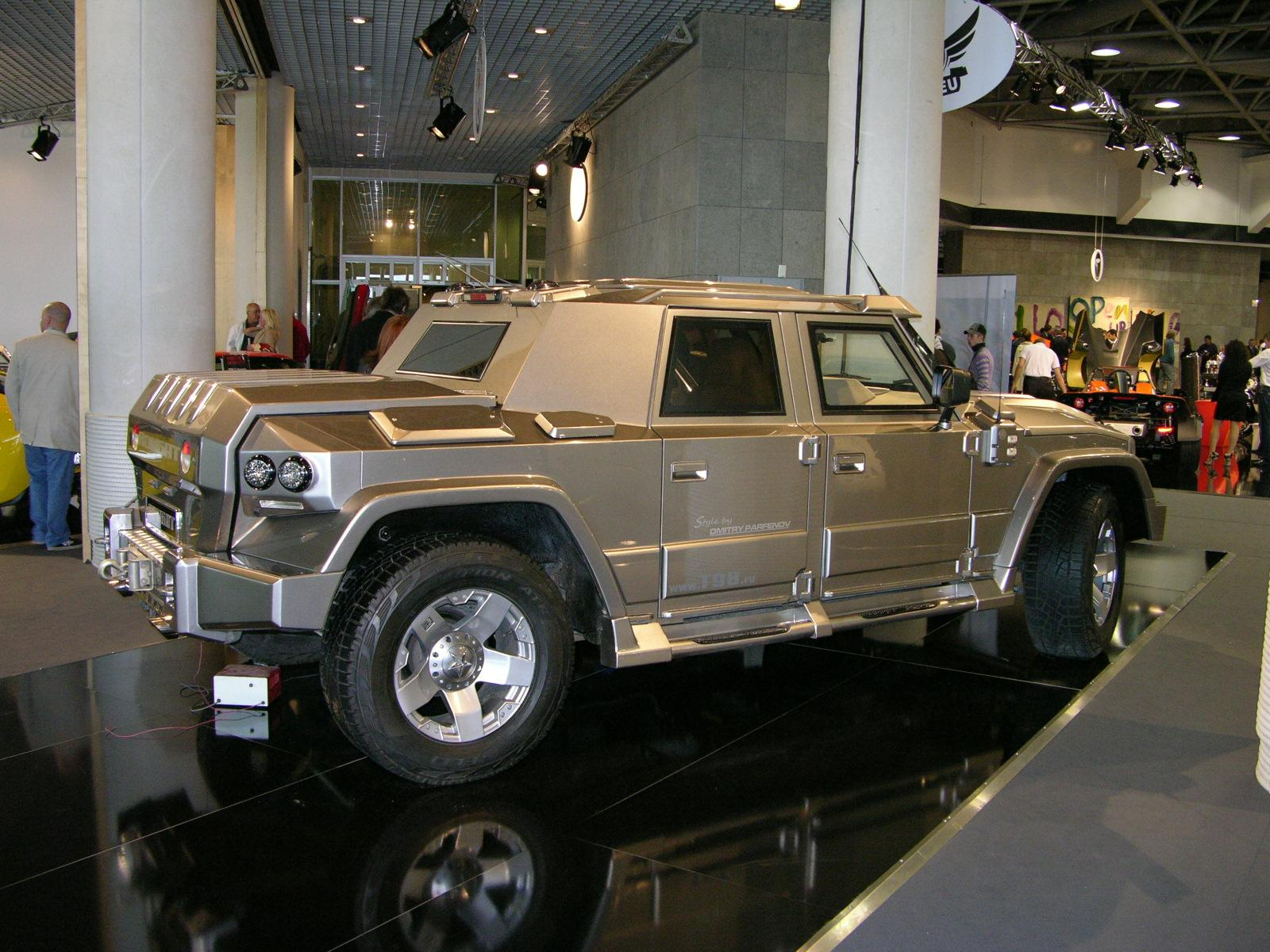
Dartz Pombron

Since September 2014, the product line consists of Prombron Black Shark and Black Snake. The Prombron is available in either the Saloon (sedan) or the Pullman (wagon), offered in standard, short, or long wheelbase.

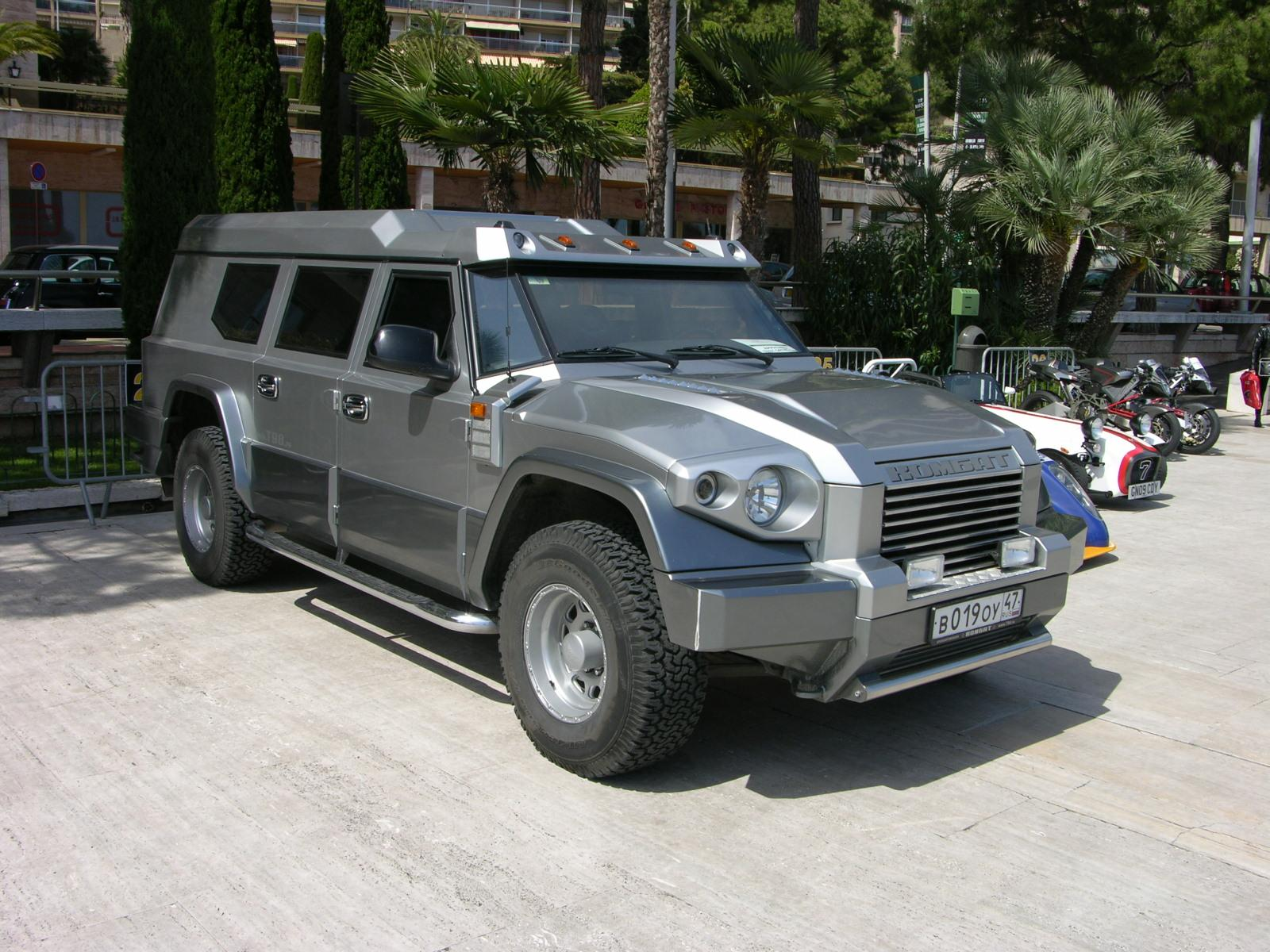
Dartz Kombat

In 2010, Red Sea Distribution announced that the T-98 Kombat would be available in North America for a list price starting at $225,000. However, just two years later the T-98 Kombat was phased out, and the Prombron was released.

Dartz's Prombron Monaco Red Diamond Edition was shown at the 2010 Top Marques in Monaco, with an expected price of €1,000,000 ($1.25 million), it would become the world's most expensive SUV. The features included white gold-ruby encrusted embedded badges as well as gold-plated, bullet-proof windows, an exhaust system made out of tungsten, diamond-ruby encrusted gauges, and Kevlar exterior coating. It also comes with three bottles of the world's most expensive vodka, RussoBaltique.

Its website explains what animal skin the interior couches are made of, or how it smells, without actual information about the armor rating or vehicle's performance.

== Removal of "Z" from Dartz logo ==
In 2022 the company announced plans to drop its "Z" logo, to apparently portray itself away from its Russian origins in the Russo-Balt company. A diamond skull sign replaced it. Their web shop however, was as of May 2025 still marketing luxury "Z" incrusted products interspaced with weaponry images.

In March 2022, the manufacturer announced the removal of the letter "Z" from its company logo. The decision came in response to the use of the letter "Z" as a pro-war symbol by Russian military forces during the invasion of Ukraine.

Historically, the "Z" in Dartz's name referred to the Russian word завод (zavod), meaning "factory", acknowledging the company's roots in the former Russo-Baltic Wagon Factory (RBVZ). However, due to the contemporary political and military connotations of the symbol, Dartz officially distanced itself from the letter. In its place, a diamond shape was introduced into the logo, symbolizing timelessness and strength — “because diamonds are forever,” the company stated.

Despite this change, Dartz retained its iconic winged skull emblem, preserving its distinctive brand identity while making a clear political and ethical statement.

The company made the announcement publicly via social media, and it was subsequently covered by Austrian news outlet Kronen Zeitung.

== See also ==
- Kombat Armouring continues production of the T-98 Kombat
