= MKI =

MKI may refer to:

- MKI (IT service company) (Mitsui Knowledge Industry), Japan
- M'Boki Airport (IATA airport code MKI), Haut-Mbomou, Central African Republic
- Dhatki language (ISO 639 language code mki), a South Asian language
- Mark I (disambiguation), including Mk.I, MkI

== See also ==
- Ilyushin Il-78 MKI, Russian cargo aircraft
- Sukhoi Su-30 MKI, Russian fighter aircraft
- MK1 (disambiguation)
- MKL (disambiguation)
