= Kombat (disambiguation) =

Kombat is a town in Namibia.

Kombat may also refer to:

- Kombat (military rank), Russian abbreviation from 'battalion commander'
- Kombat (album), a 1996 album by Russian rock band Lyube
- Kombat Armouring, a Russian armoured vehicle and car manufacturer
  - T-98 Kombat
- Kombat (photograph), a World War II photograph
- Kombat (song), a song made by Lyube as a tribute to World War II veterans
- Kombat (missile), Ukrainian anti-tank guided missile

== See also ==
- Mortal Kombat, a video game franchise
- Kombat Opera Presents, British musical comedy television show
- Combat (disambiguation)
