= MK1 =

MK1 or Mk1 may refer to:

== Mark 1 ==
- Mark I (disambiguation), a first version of a product, frequently military hardware
- Volkswagen Golf Mk1, first-generation Volkswagen Golf
- Eagle Mk1, also known as the Eagle T1G, a Formula One racing car

== Mortal Kombat video games and films ==
- Mortal Kombat (1992 video game), the first game in the Mortal Kombat series
- Mortal Kombat 1, the 2023 twelfth game in the Mortal Kombat series
- Mortal Kombat (1995 film), a 1995 film, the first film in the 1990s film series based on the videogame series
- Mortal Kombat (2021 film), a 2021 film, the first film in the 2020s film series based on the videogame series, a reboot of the film series

== Other uses ==
- MK1, a postcode in the MK postcode area
- Super Mario Kart, first entry in the Mario Kart series

== See also ==
- M1K, see List of postal codes of Canada: M
- MKI (disambiguation)
- MKL (disambiguation)
- MK (disambiguation)
- Mortal Kombat 1 (disambiguation)
