= Immortal Combat =

Immortal Combat may refer to:

- Immortal Combat (film), a 1994 film by Dan Neira
- Immortal Combat (album), a 2011 album by Hostyle Gospel

== See also ==
- Immortal Kombat (disambiguation)
- Mortal Kombat (disambiguation), including "Mortal Combat"
