= Max Alpert =

Soviet photographer (1899–1980)

- Born: 18 March 1899; Simferopol, Russian Empire
- Died: 30 November 1980 (aged 81); Moscow, Soviet Union
- Occupation: Photographer
- Known for: Kombat
- Spouse: Glafira Belits-Geiman

Max Vladimirovich Alpert (Russian: Макс Владимирович Альперт; 18 March 1899 – 30 November 1980) was a prominent Soviet photographer who was mostly known for his frontline work during World War II.

== Biography ==
Before World War I, Alpert studied in Odessa, where he lived until the early twenties. There he began taking pictures in 1914 with his brother Mikhail, moving to Moscow that year. After the war he worked as a photographer for Pravda and Rabochaya Gazeta (Workers Newspaper) in Moscow. In the 1930s, he photographed numerous construction sites of the Soviet Union. During that time, Sergei Eisenstein stayed with him at the Great Fergana Canal and was impressed by his passion for photography. At Pravda, he was known as a prolific portrait photographer. He exhibited documentary photography in Moscow in 1928 and 1931, and in Stuttgart, in Film und Foto. In 1931 and in collaboration with Arkadikh Shaikhet and Solomon Tules, he made the picture story "A day in the life of a working class Muscovite family". Its serial narrative, non-formalist photography was a model for other Rossiiskoe obshchestvo proletarskikh fotoreporterov ROPF (Russian Association of Proletarian Photojournalists) photographers. He was a frequent contributor of such stories to the magazine SSSR na stroike.

During World War II, Alpert took a number of iconic photographs at the Soviet frontlines and also documented military events in Prague and Berlin. For his work during the war, he was awarded the Order of the Red Star (1943), the Order of the Patriotic War (1945) and the Order of the Red Banner of Labour. After the war, he worked at RIA Novosti, where he compiled a famous photo album of Nikolai Amosov. Examples of his images are held in the Sovfoto archive.

== Gallery ==
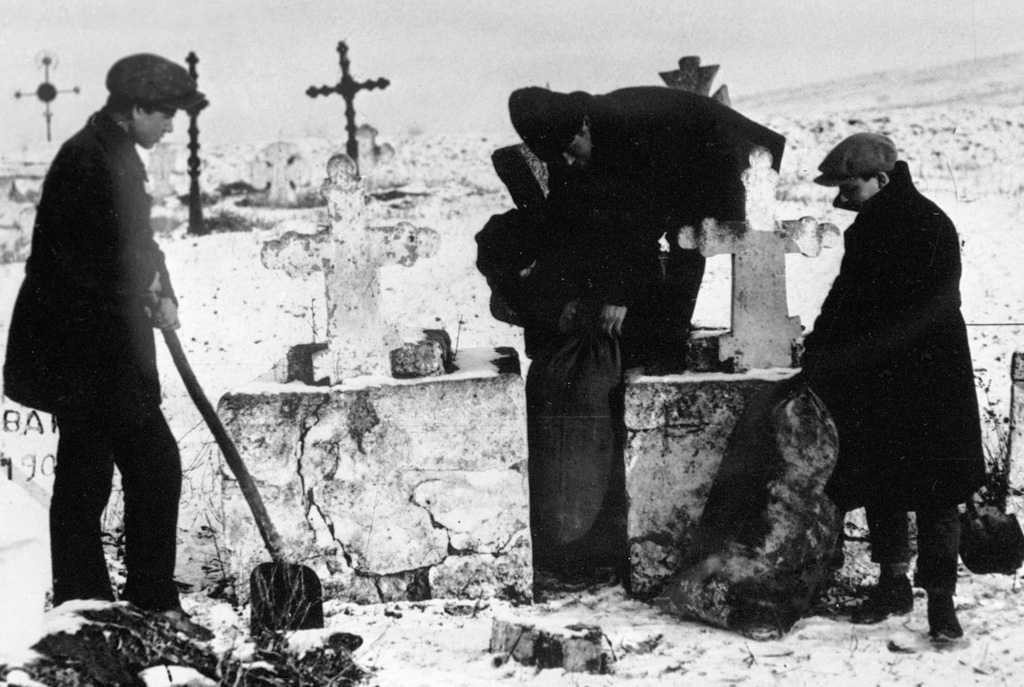
Komsomol members seize "grain hidden by kulaks" 1 November 1930

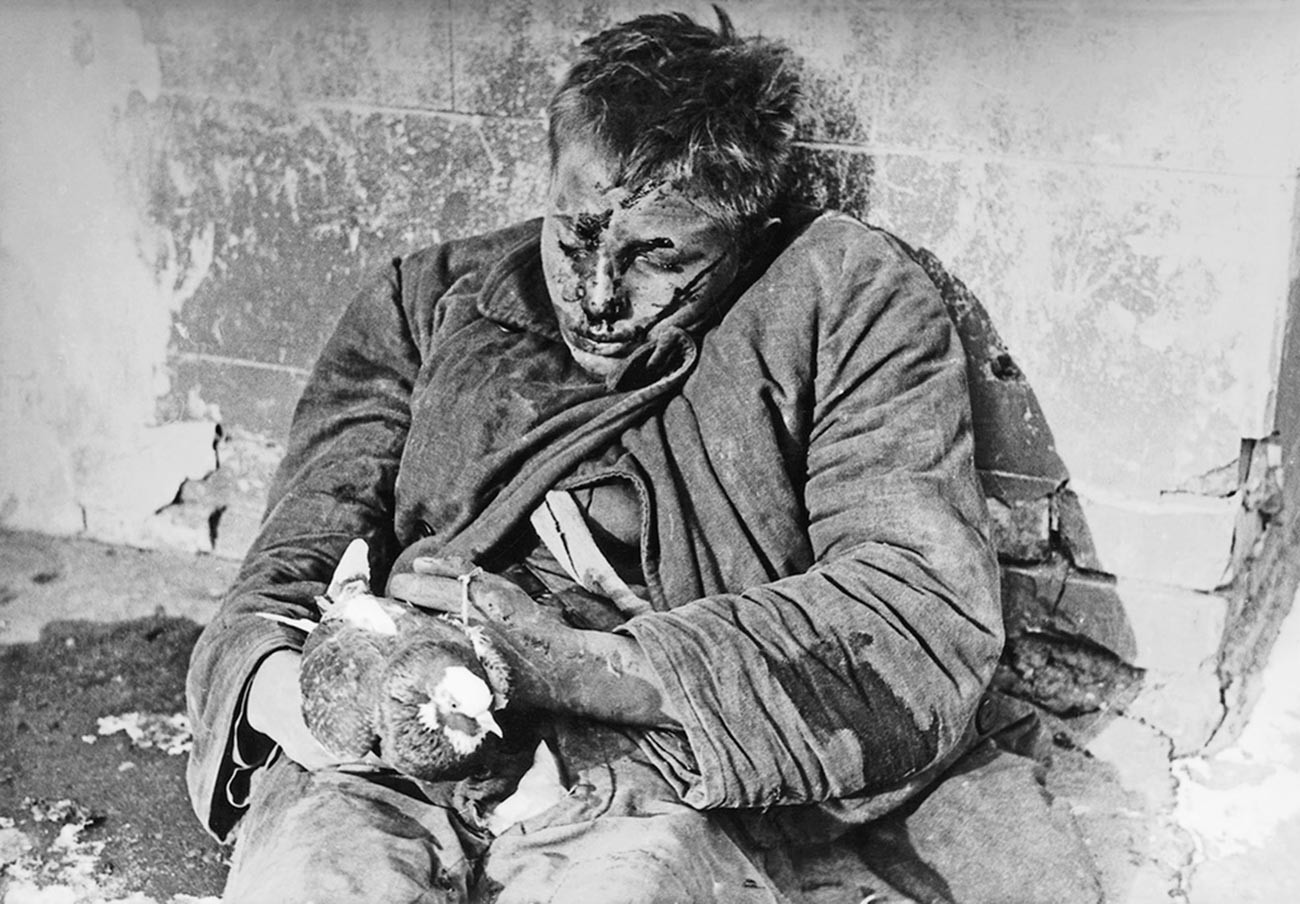
Viktor Cherevihkin, a Soviet teenager killed by German troops occupying Rostov for keeping pigeons, 28 November 1941

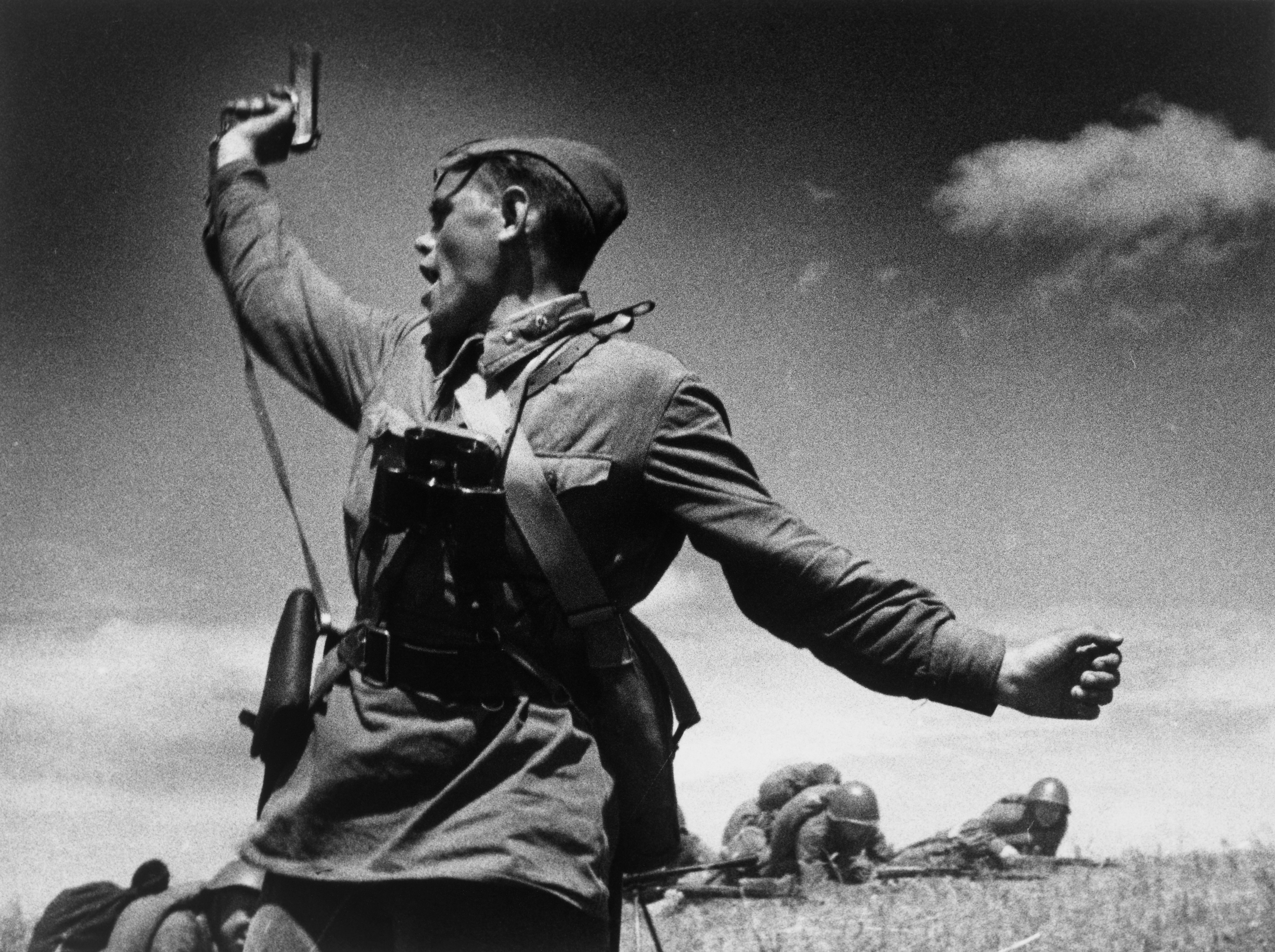
Kombat, possibly 12 July 1942
