= Moral Combat =

Moral Combat may refer to:

- Moral Combat, a 2011 book by Sikivu Hutchinson
- Moral Combat, a 2011 video game by the Center for the Army Profession and Ethic
- Moral Combat, a 2017 book by Christopher Ferguson and Patrick M. Markey

== See also ==
- Spencer Halpin's Moral Kombat, a 2009 film by Spencer Halpin
- Mortal Kombat (disambiguation)
