= Mortality =

Mortality may refer to:

- Fish mortality, a parameter used in fisheries population dynamics to account for the loss of fish in a fish stock through death
- Mortality (book), a 2012 collection of essays by Anglo-American writer Christopher Hitchens
- Mortality (metal band), a somewhat known band that was created in Pernik Bulgaria, featuring a 4 member death/thrash metal band. The founder and frontwoman, featuring Viktoria (the bassist and vocalist) and the lead guitarist (Danail) were the only original members of the band, until it came to its end in the middle of 2026.
- Mortality (computability theory), a property of a Turing machine if it halts when run on any starting configuration
- Mortality rate, a measure for the rate at which deaths occur in a given population
- Mortality/differential attrition, an error in the internal validity of a scientific study

== See also ==
- Case fatality rate, the proportion of deaths within a designated population of people with a medical condition
- Cause of death
- Fulminant
- Mortality displacement, a (forward) temporal shift in the rate of mortality
- Mortality salience, awareness of one's eventual death
- Mortal (disambiguation)
- Morbidity and mortality (disambiguation)
