= Immortal Kombat =

Immortal Kombat may refer to:

- "Immortal Kombat" (Mortal Kombat: Conquest), an episode of the television series Mortal Kombat: Conquest
- "Immortal Kombat" (Supergirl), an episode of the television series Supergirl

== See also ==
- Immortal Combat (disambiguation)
- Mortal Kombat (disambiguation)
