= Morbidity and mortality =

Morbidity and mortality may refer to:

- Morbidity and Mortality (journal), now known as Morbidity and Mortality Weekly Report, a weekly publication by the Centers for Disease Control and Prevention
- Morbidity and mortality conference, a periodic conference in many medical centers usually held to review cases with poor or avoidable outcomes

== See also ==
- Morbidity, a diseased state, disability, or poor health
- Mortality (disambiguation)
- Mortality rate, a measure of the number of deaths in a given population
