= Z (military symbol) =

Russian military and propaganda symbol

"Z" symbol

"Z" symbol (enclosed in a square)

"V" symbol

"O" symbol

Symbols used on Russian military vehicles during the invasion of Ukraine

The Latin-script letter Z (Russian: зет, romanized: zet, IPA: [zɛt]) is one of several symbols (including "V" and "O") painted on military vehicles of the Russian Armed Forces involved in the invasion of Ukraine. It is speculated that the Z helps distinguish task forces from one another and serves as an identifier to avoid friendly fire; however, Russian officials have claimed various meanings for the symbol.

Due to its association with the war in Ukraine, the Z has become a militarist symbol in Russian propaganda and is used by Russian civilians to indicate support for the invasion, further adopted later by Russian far-right organizations. The symbol has subsequently been banned from public display in various countries, and its use has been criminalized by several European governments. Opponents of the war have pejoratively called the Z symbol a zwastika or zwaztika, in reference to the Nazi swastika, or derisively in Russian and Ukrainian as ziga (Russian: зига), in reference to Sieg Heil. Some Ukrainian officials and Internet users have referred to Russia as Ruzzia or RuZZia (Russian: Роzzия or РоZZия; Ukrainian: Роzzія or РоZZія), replacing the letter S with a Z in reference to the military symbol.

== Military use ==
=== Description ===
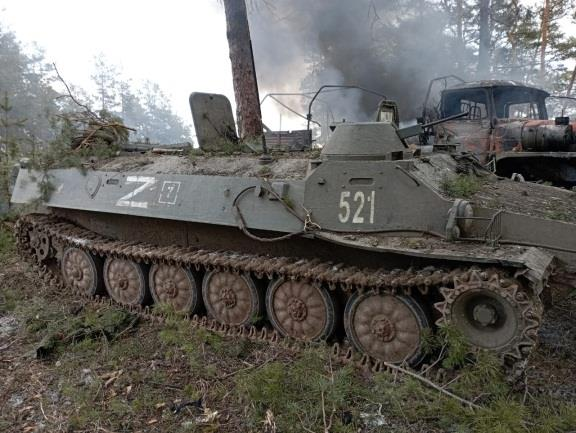
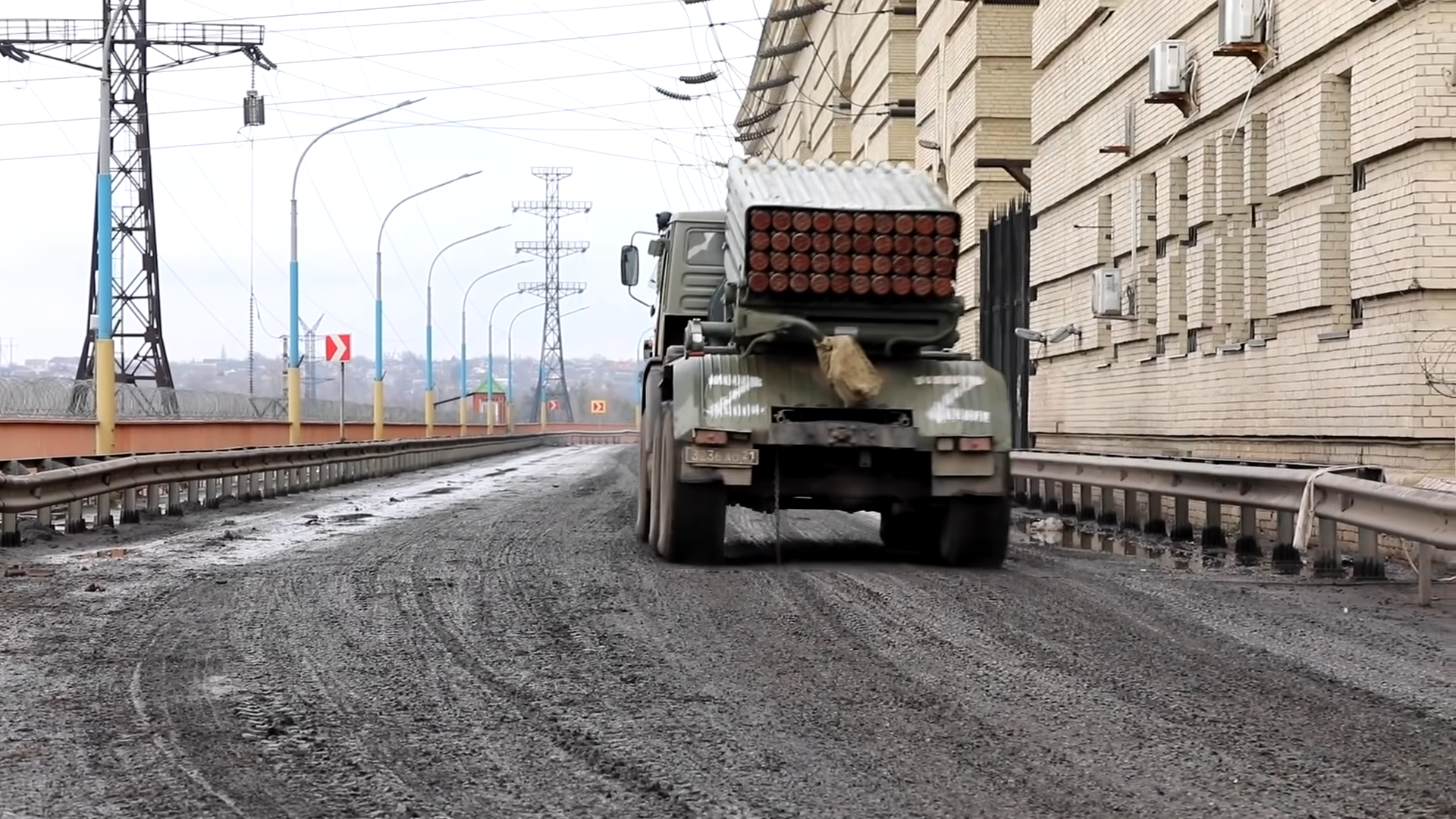
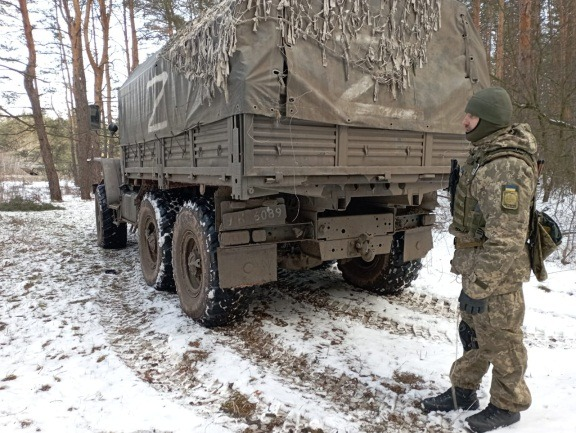
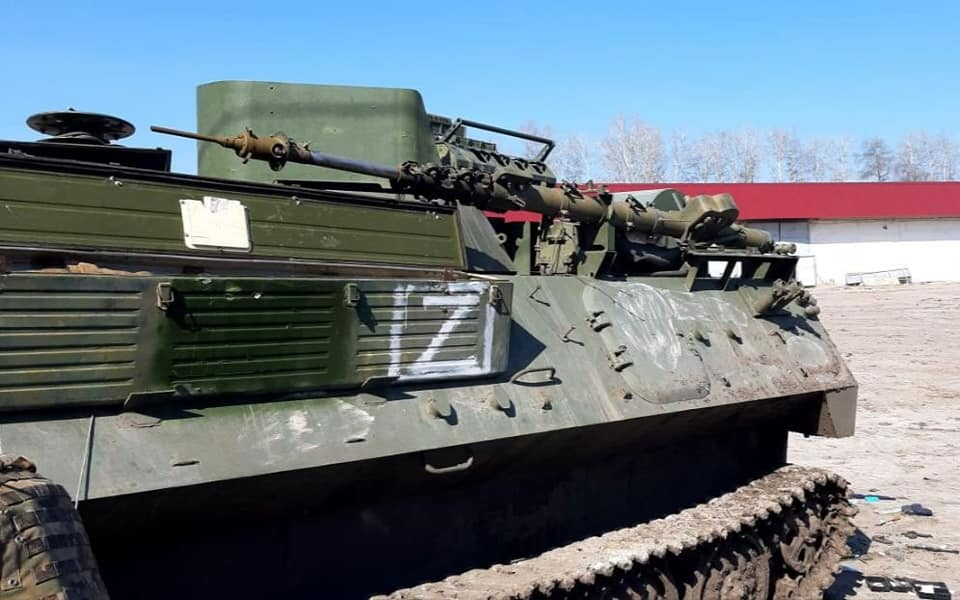
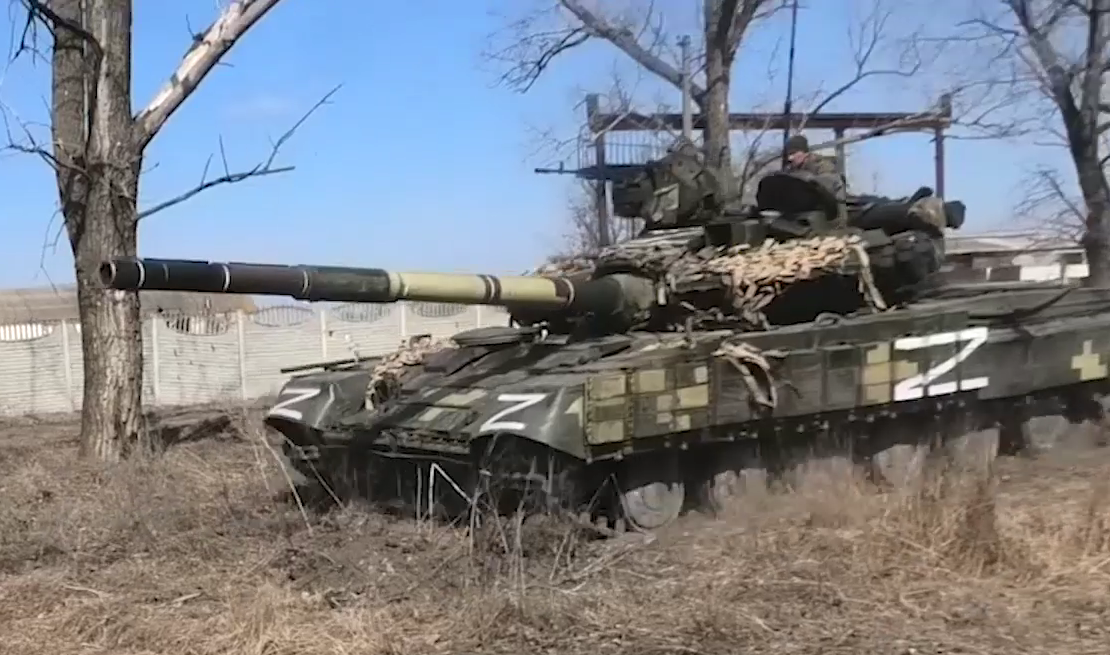
Russian military vehicles inscribed with a Z (and Z-boxed)

Various letters with corresponding meanings have been used by the Russian Armed Forces during the Russian invasion of Ukraine. The form of the "Z" symbol is a reproduction of the Latin letter Z, identical also to a capital Greek zeta. The "Z" symbol is used instead of the equivalent Cyrillic letter З (Ze) used in the Russian alphabet, which has been described as peculiar, considering the symbol's later association with Russian nationalism and pro-Putin politics. This could be to avoid confusion with the numeral of a similar form 3, which is also used in Russia.

=== Purpose ===
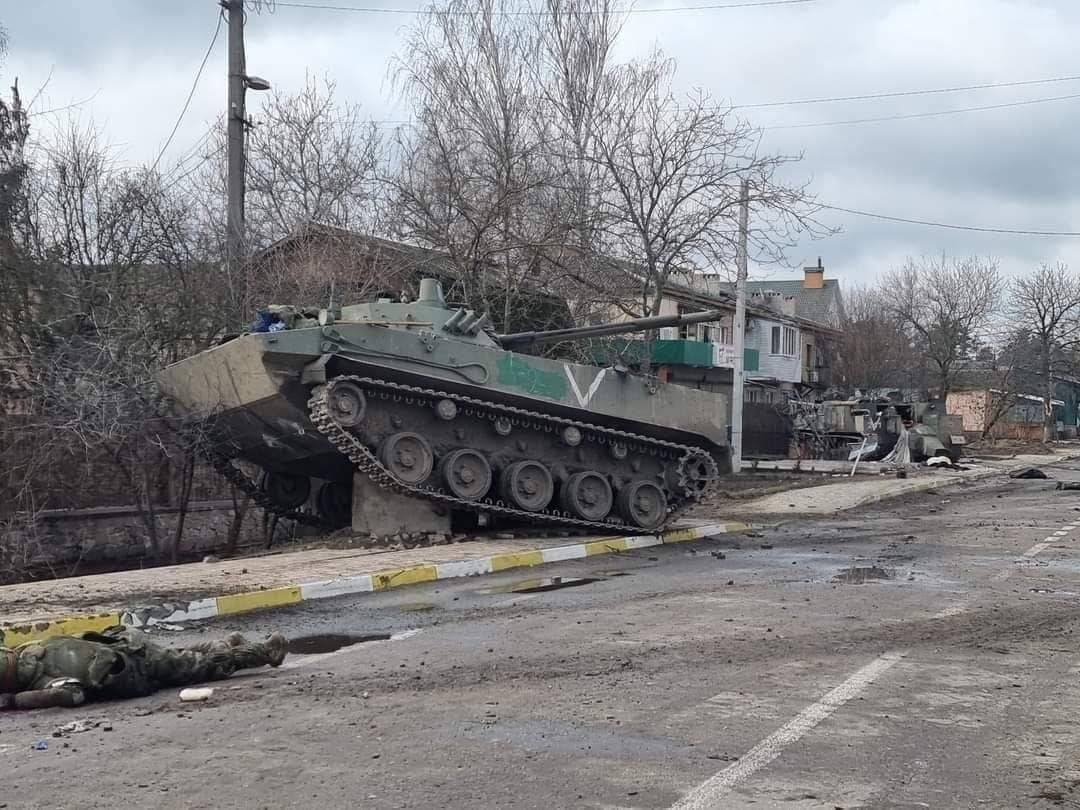
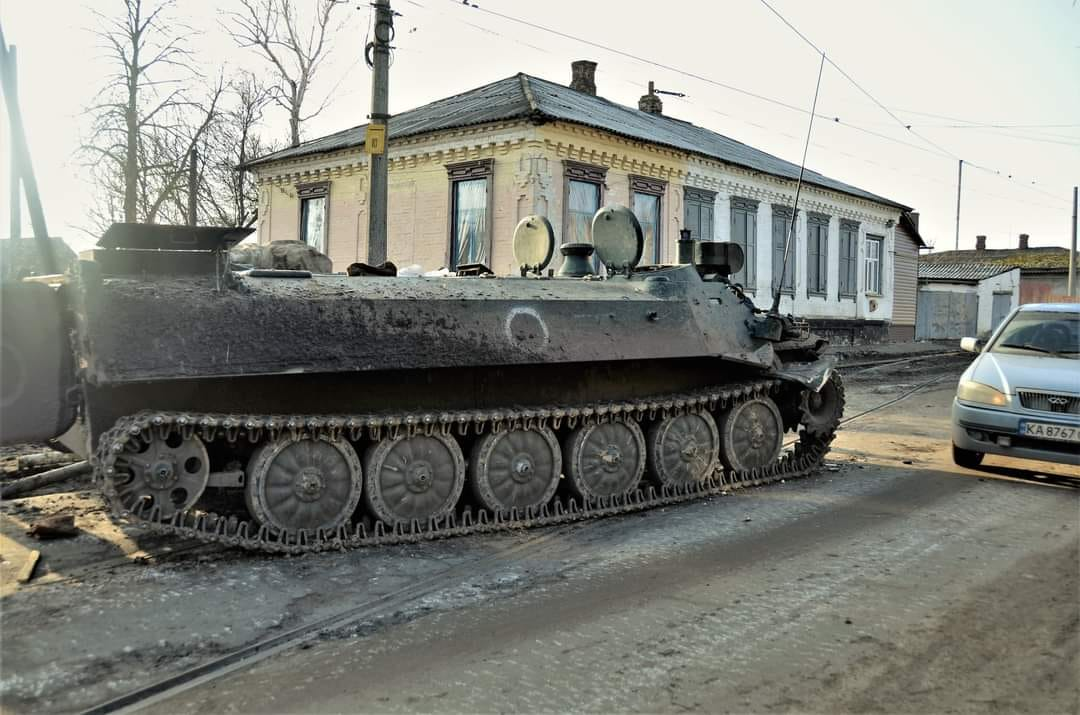
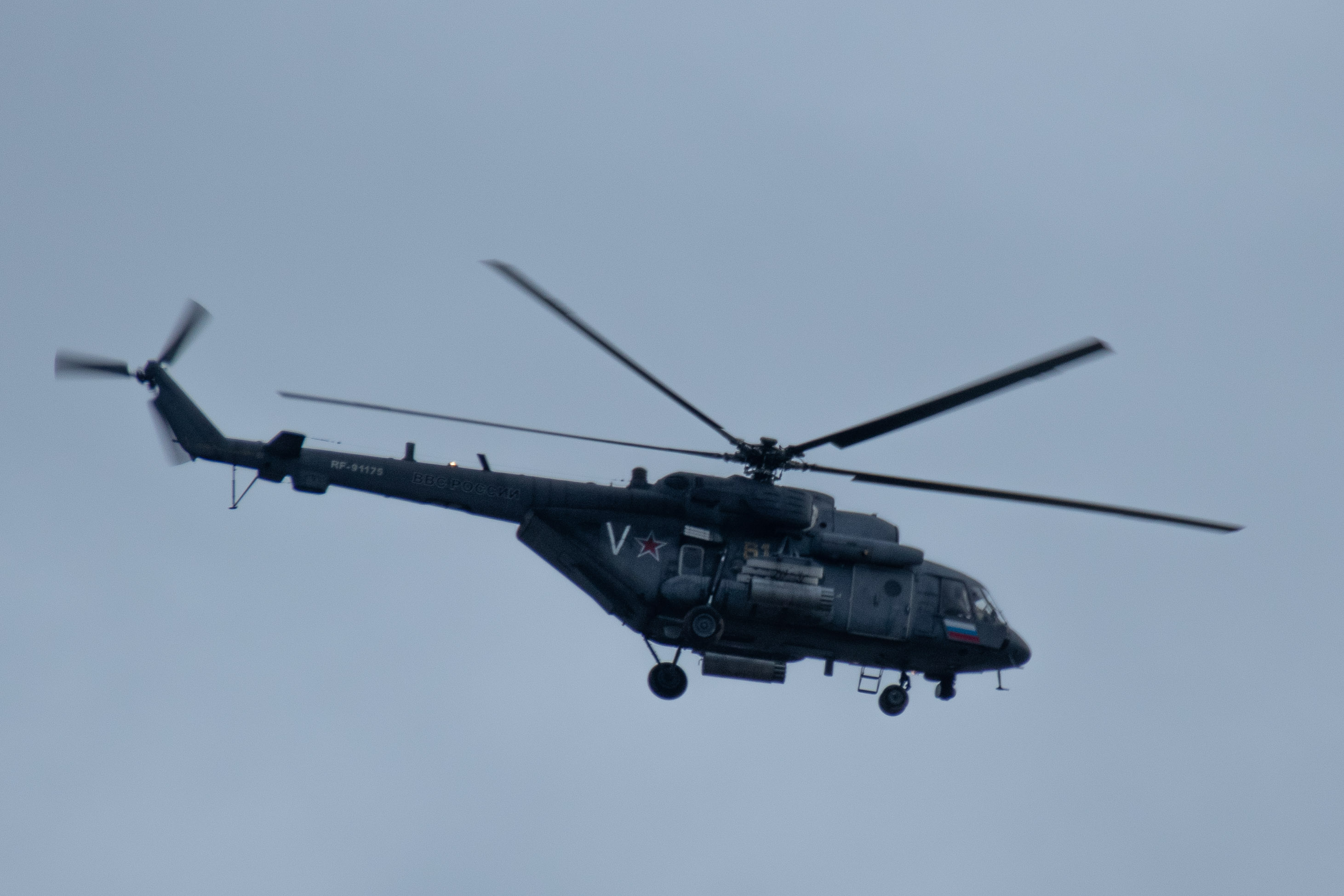
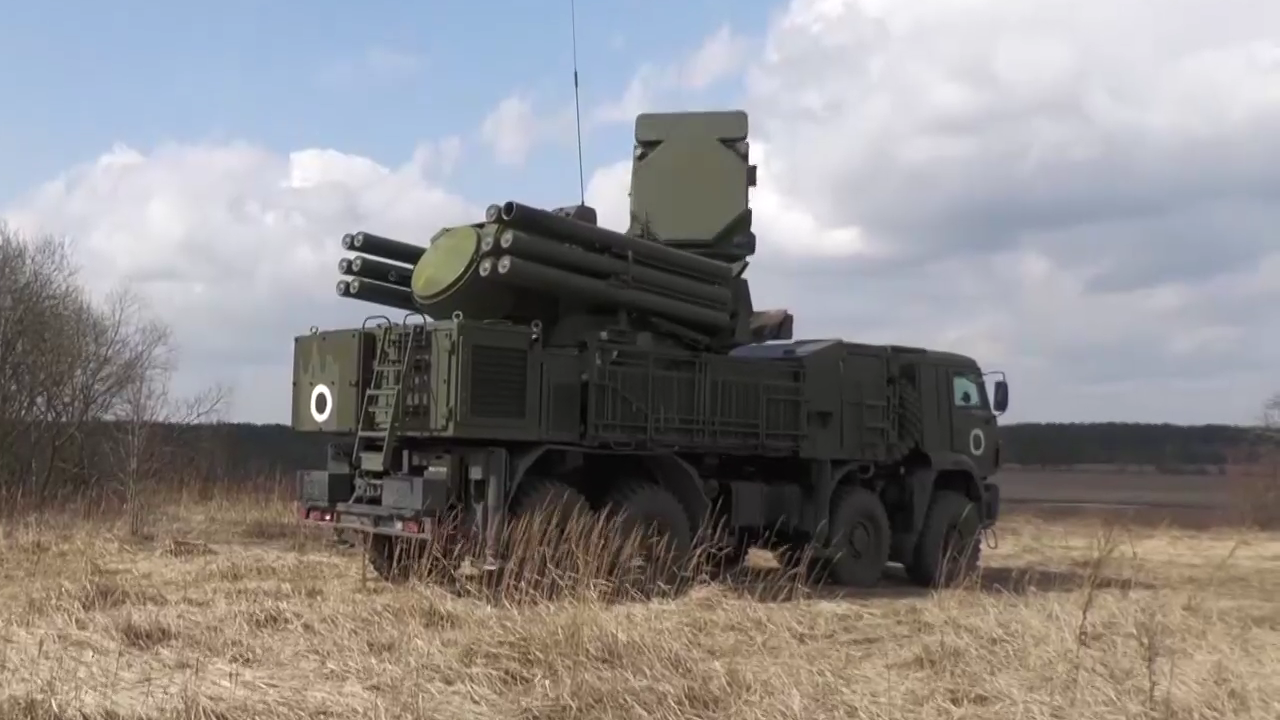
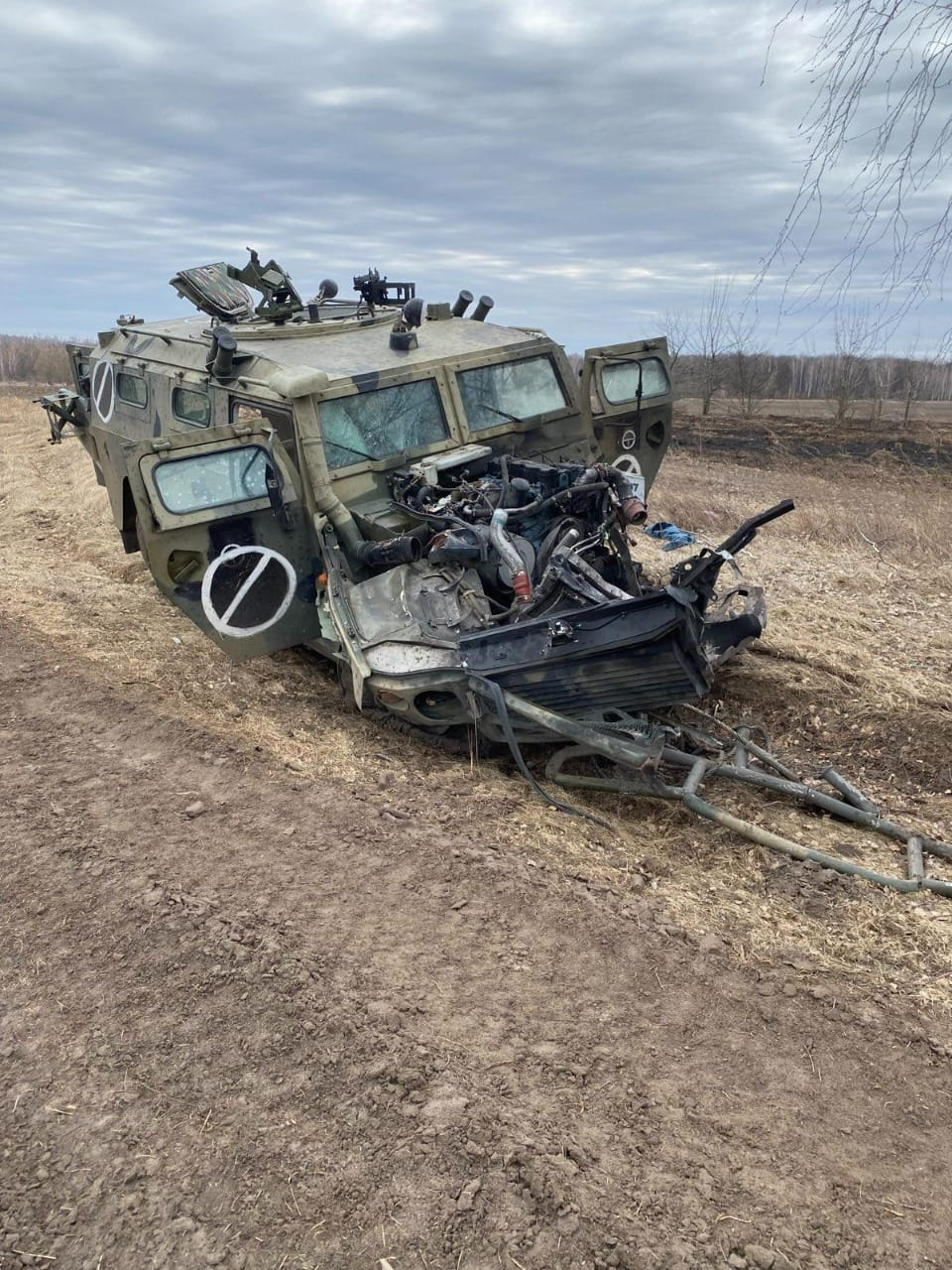
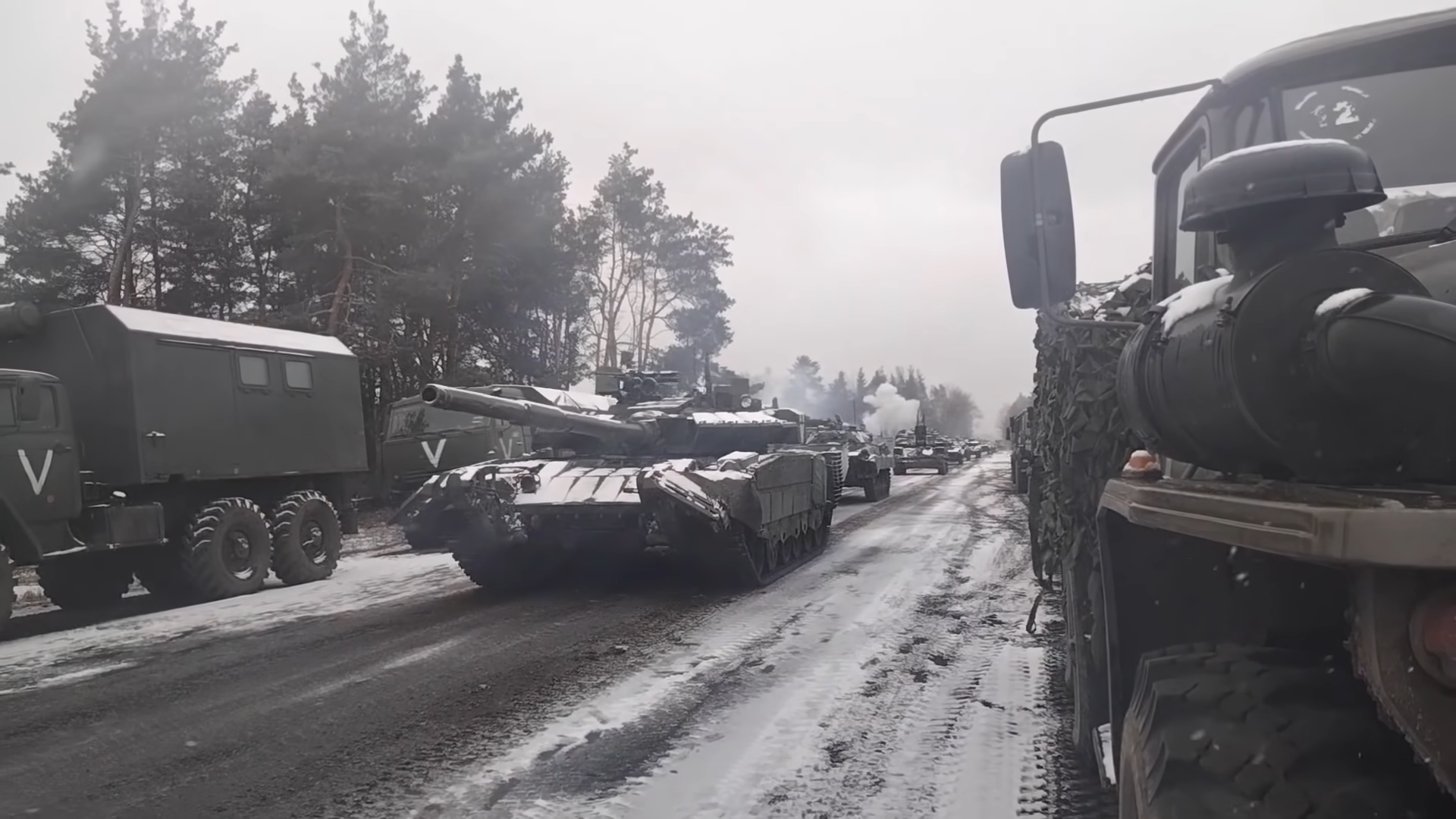
Some of the other letters inscribed by the Russian military on their vehicles including a V, an O, and an O with a diagonal stroke.

Military experts think the symbols are identifying marks used to reduce friendly fire, similar to the invasion stripes used in the Normandy landings during World War II. Some military experts think the symbols help distinguish different Russian army groups from one another, with former Royal United Services Institute director Michael Clarke saying that "often these symbols will be location-based: they will communicate where the unit is going" and pointing to the U.S. military's use of chevrons during the 2003 invasion of Iraq. The latter theory was confirmed by Russian veteran Sergey Kuvykin, who indicated in an interview with Life that symbols including "a 'Z' in a square, a 'Z' in a circle, a 'Z' with a star or simply 'Z' on its own" have been used to tell teams apart.

Russian vehicles along the Russia–Ukraine border displayed the "Z" symbol during the 2021–2022 Russo-Ukrainian crisis in the weeks before the invasion. During the Battle of Kharkiv, locals used the "Z" symbols to identify and track Russian vehicles on Telegram.

=== Naming ===
On Instagram, the Russian Ministry of Defence (MoD) posted on 3 March 2022 that the "Z" symbol is an abbreviation of the phrase "for victory" (Russian: за победу, romanized: za pobedu), while the "V" symbol stands for "strength is in truth" (Russian: сила в правде, romanized: sila v pravde) (a quotion from the Brat movie) and "The task will be completed" (Russian: задача будет выполнена, romanized: zadacha budet vypolnena). The MoD later suggested alternative meanings for "Z", including "For peace" (Russian: за мир, romanized: za mir), "For truth" (Russian: за правду, romanized: za pravdu), "For ours" (Russian: за наших, romanized: za nashikh), and the letter Z in words demilitarization and denazification, which Russian President Vladimir Putin has asserted to be the purpose of the invasion.

Another interpretation for "Z" is the Russian word for west (Russian: запад, romanized: zapad), to designate the Western Military District or west-bound infantry, with the "V" symbol similarly standing for the word for east (Russian: восток, romanized: vostok). This term was used in the joint Zapad 2021 exercise between Belarus and Russia before the invasion.

== Use as pro-war symbolism ==
=== Russian state ===
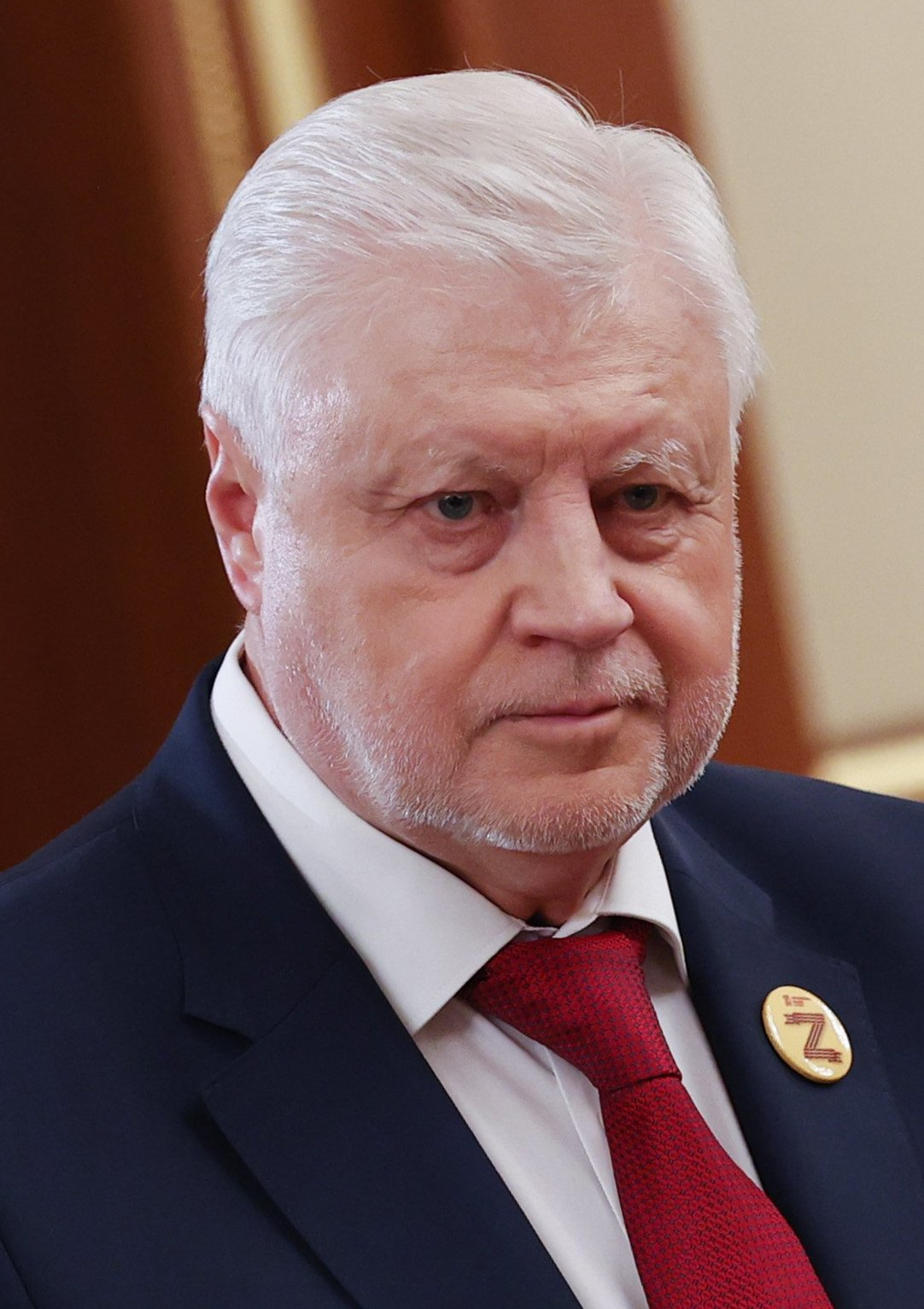
Sergey Mironov wearing a pin with a "Z" symbol

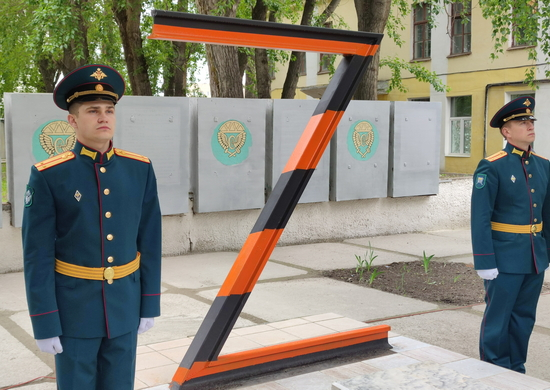
A "Z" war monument in Yekaterinburg with a guard of honor

Since mid-March 2022, the "Z" began to be used by the Russian government as a pro-war propaganda motif, and has been appropriated by pro-Putin civilians as a symbol of support for Russia's invasion. Governor Sergey Tsivilyov of Kuzbass (Russian: Кузбасс) changed the name of the region to a hybrid word that replaced the lowercase Cyrillic letter з with the capital Latin letter Z (Russian: КуZбасс, romanized: KuZbass). The Roscosmos director general, Dmitry Rogozin, began spelling his surname as RogoZin (Russian: РогоZин), and ordered employees at the Russia-managed Baikonur Cosmodrome in Kazakhstan to mark equipment with the "Z" and "V" symbols. Pro-Kremlin Telegram channels have incorporated the letter Z in their names since the beginning of the invasion, and Russian telecom authority Roskomnadzor changed the handle of its Telegram channel to showcase the "Z" in its name. Russian government agencies have also promoted the "Z" symbol in nationalist messages and videos on VK. The 2022 Moscow rally, held on 18 March 2022, which was used by president Putin to drum up support for the war, was officially called in Russia "For a world without Nazism" (Russian: «Zа мир без нацизма»), with Latin Z replacing Russian З. Syrian soldiers contracted by Russia to join the invasion raised "Z" symbol posters while cheering in videos aired by Russian state media. On 22 March 2022, Russia launched a Soyuz rocket with the "Z" symbol.

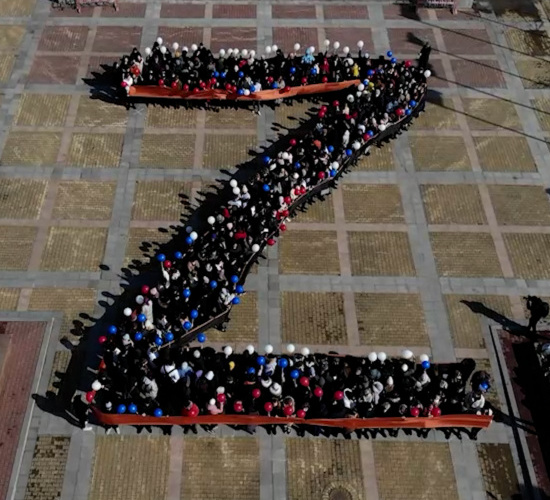
Residents of Khabarovsk, including Young Guard of United Russia members, arranged in a "Z" formation, as organized by the city administration and the United Russia party

The logo of Storm-Z, penal military units participating in the war

Vehicle marking of Wagner Group during its rebellion

"Z" in ribbon of Saint George colors with hashtag #СвоихНеБросаем (#SvoikhNeBrosaem; "We don't abandon our own")

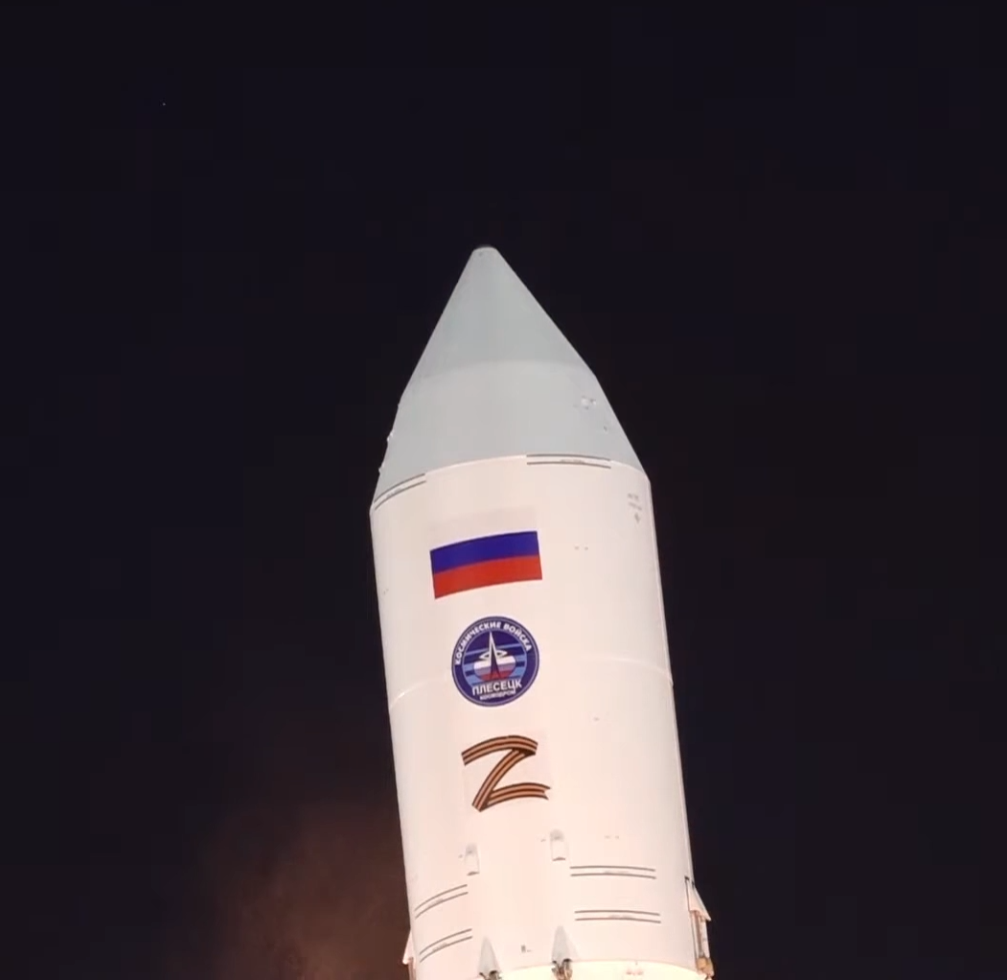
A St. George-stylized Z on a Soyuz-2.1b launch vehicle

=== Other ===
Local authorities in several parts of Russia have organized flash mobs in support of the invasion prominently featuring the symbol. On social media, propaganda videos have been shared depicting flash mobs consisting of pro-war youth activists wearing black shirts decorated with the "Z" symbol and shouting, "For Russia, for Putin!", alongside the #СвоихНеБросаем (transl. we do not abandon our own) hashtag. In a social media video, State Duma member Maria Butina drew a "Z" on her jacket to show support for the invasion and encouraged others to do so as well. Russian state-controlled broadcaster RT has sold merchandise featuring the symbol as a show of support for Russian forces, often with a texture taken from the ribbon of Saint George. Amazon sold "Z" symbol products in the UK, but took down the listings on 8 March after receiving public criticism and media inquiries. The "Z" symbol was also used in pro-Russian rallies in Serbia during the invasion. In Venezuela, Chavista groups included the "Z" symbol in a mural in the Catia parish, in Caracas, depicting and supporting Vladimir Putin and late Venezuelan President Hugo Chávez.

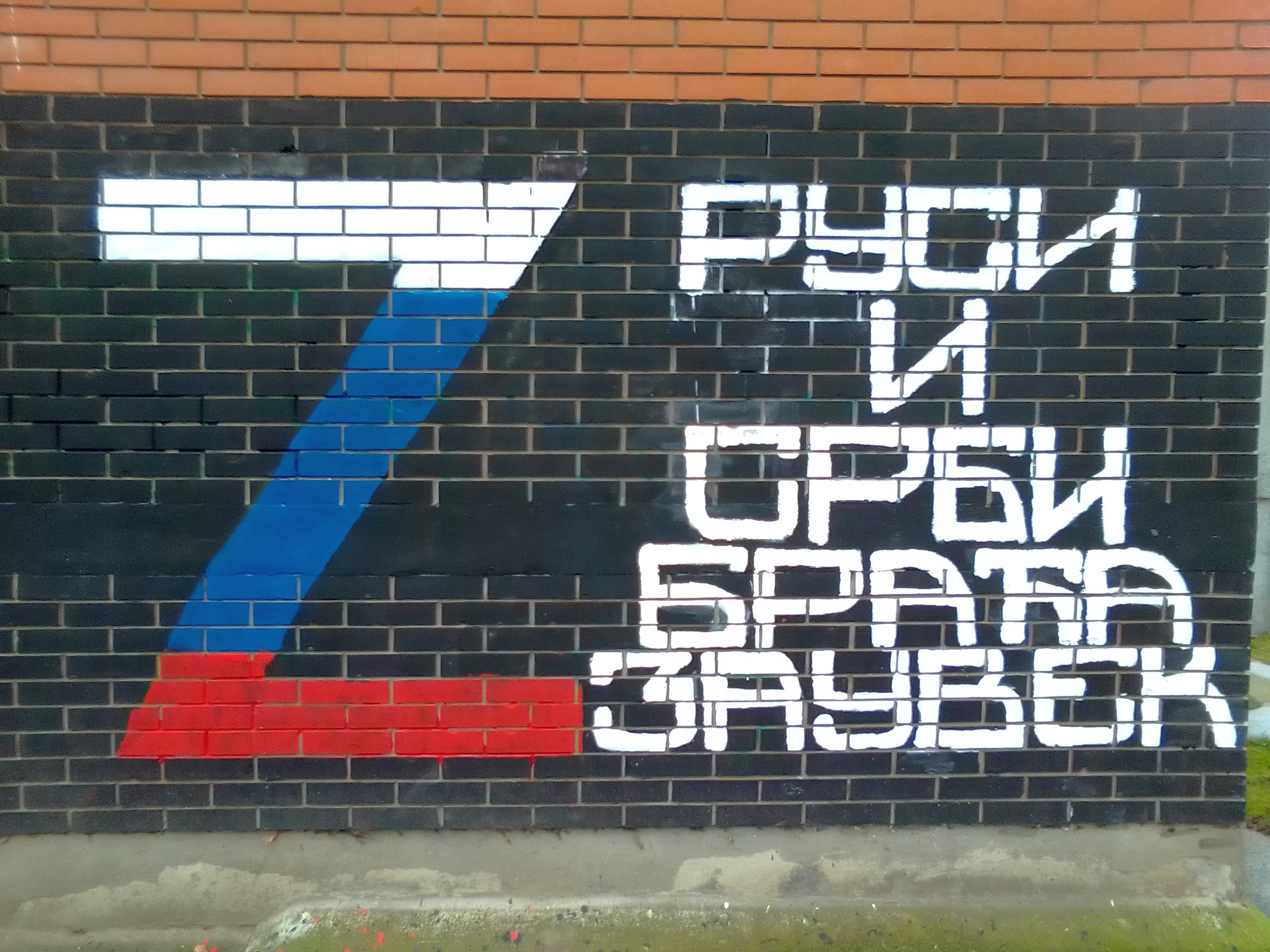
A mural "Z" symbol in support of Russia's war against Ukraine with an inscription "Russians and Serbs brothers forever", in Belgrade, Serbia

Anti-war activists in Russia have seen their property defaced with graffiti containing the "Z" symbol. Russian film critic Anton Dolin, whose door was marked with the symbol, compared the "Z" to the zombie action-horror film World War Z (2013) and described the Russian army and pro-war activists as "zombified". Police officers left "Z" markings while ransacking the building of the human rights organization Memorial after its government-mandated shutdown. The apartment of a member of Pussy Riot – a protest art collective – has also been vandalized with the symbol.

The symbol has also been used for vandalism and propaganda purposes outside of Russia. In Moldova, unknown vandals painted the symbols "Z" and "V" over crosses at the World War II Chișinău Heroes' Cemetery, on graves of soldiers of the Axis-aligned Romania which fought against the Soviet Union. In Latvia, unknown vandals spray-painted the letter "Z" twice on the Bikernieki Memorial which is dedicated to the victims of the Holocaust.

The Russian language search engine Yandex censored the search results for the Z symbol, not allowing symbols of Nazism to be juxtaposed with it.

During the 2023 unrest in North Kosovo, where Serbs are in the majority, the "Z" symbol was painted on Kosovo police and NATO peacekeepers' vehicles.

== Analysis ==
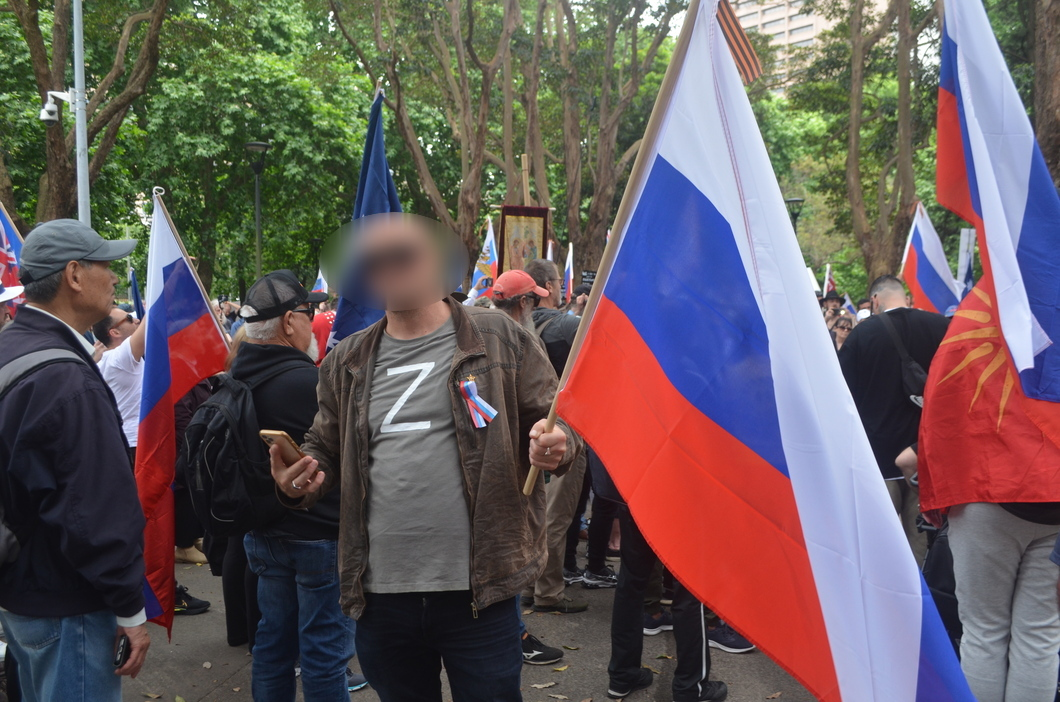
A pro-Russian protester wearing a "Z" t-shirt at a "Rally for Australian Neutrality", in Sydney

Kamil Galeev of the Woodrow Wilson International Center for Scholars said on 7 March 2022 that the "symbol invented just a few days ago became a symbol of new Russian ideology and national identity." A number of critics have described the "Z" as a variant of Nazi symbolism, with some comparing it to the Nazi swastika; the symbol has been pejoratively nicknamed by some Internet users as the zwastika and Zieg (or Ziega (Russian: Zига) in Russian) from the Nazi salute Sieg Heil (which is often called "зига" ("siega") in Russian). Some Ukrainian officials and Internet users started using the symbol to refer to Russia as Ruzzia or RuZZia. Also on 7 March, Ukrainian Minister of Defense Oleksii Reznikov condemned the use of the "Z" symbol, noting its resemblance to the name of the Station Z gas chamber of the Sachsenhausen concentration camp.

In Novosibirsk, independent city councillor Khelga Pirogova told RFE/RL's Siberia.Realities: "I have been getting rather a lot of messages from residents who are asking that something be done about this symbol. They don't like it. It arouses in them anxiety, fear, and other negative emotions." On 25 March 2022, Russian journalist Izabella Yevloyeva was charged under Russia's "false information" law after sharing a post on social media that described the "Z" symbol as being "synonymous with aggression, death, pain and shameless manipulation". Under a law passed on 4 March, she faced up to 15 years in prison.

On 23 May 2022, Russian diplomat Boris Bondarev announced that he had resigned from his position in protest over the Russian invasion of Ukraine, referring to the invasion as an "aggressive war", saying that it was not only a crime against the Ukrainian people, but also "the most serious crime against the people of Russia, with a bold letter Z crossing out all hopes and prospects for a prosperous free society in our country".

== International censure ==
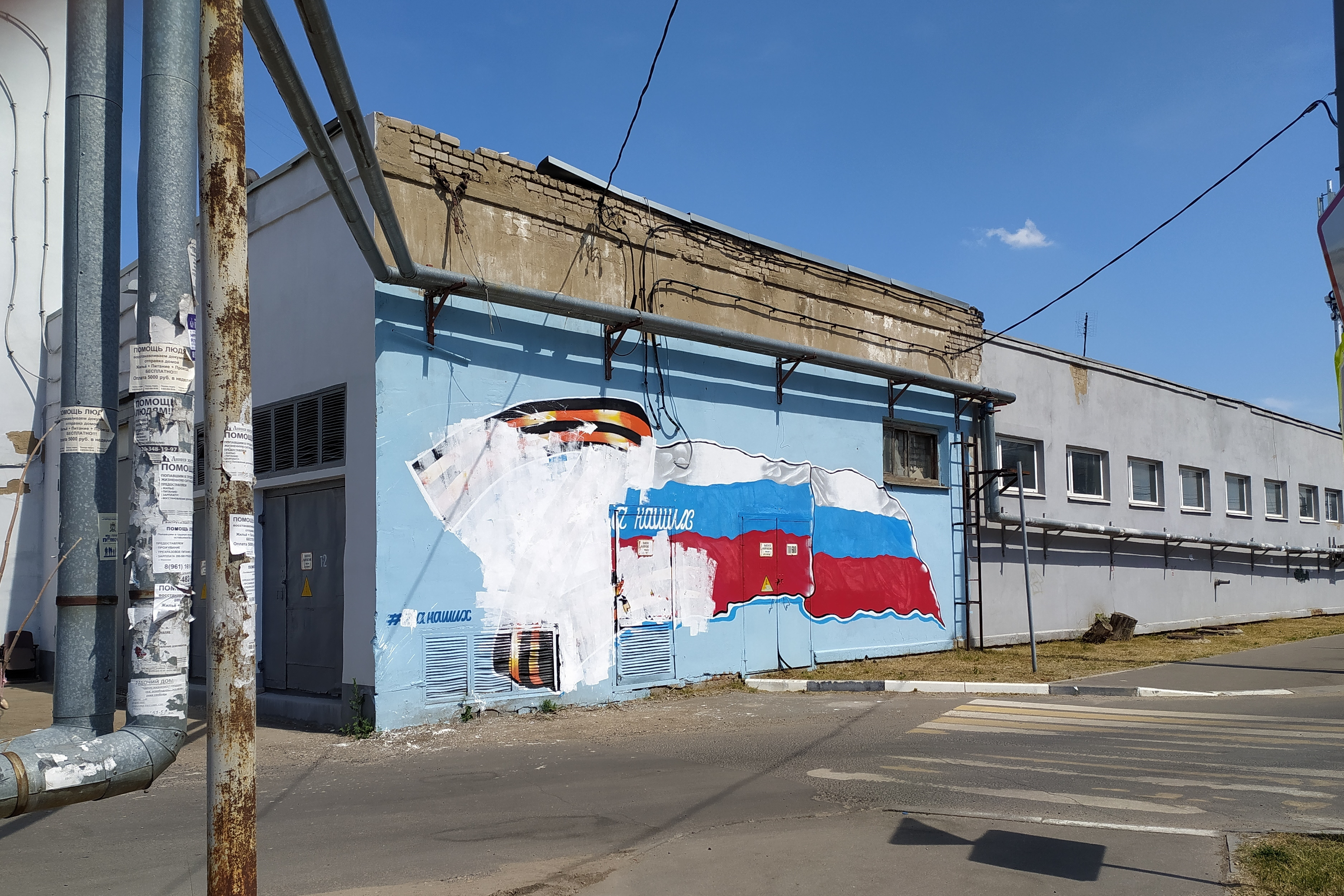
Defaced "Z" in Ivanovo (Russia)

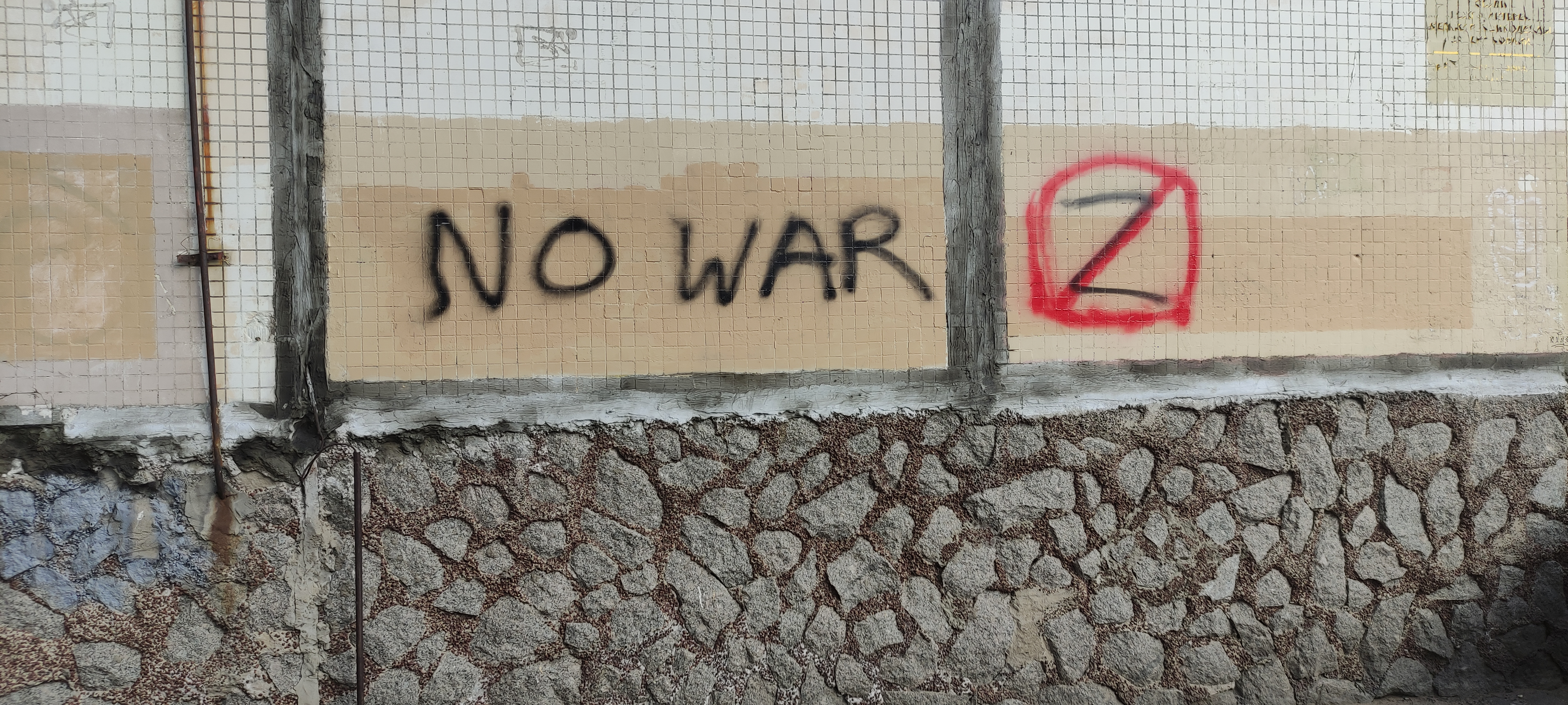
Anti-war graffiti in Saint Petersburg

=== By governments ===
- Czech Republic – as part of a ban on publicly supporting the invasion, the Ministry of the Interior has classified the "Z" symbol as an equivalent to the swastika.
- Estonia – in April 2022, a ban was issued by the Riigikogu.
- Georgia – the ban of symbols is proposed by Lelo for Georgia opposition party.
- Germany – the Federal Ministry of the Interior and Community said that using "Z" to indicate support for the Russian invasion of Ukraine is a felony punishable by up to three years in prison.
  - In April 2022, the vehicle registration office in Herford, North Rhine-Westphalia ceased issuing vehicle registration plates with the letter combination "HF-Z" due to the use of the letter "Z" as a symbol of a war of aggression.
- Kazakhstan – the military symbols are prohibited from being shown on vehicles in public, with the West Kazakhstan Region Police Department explicitly stating that the drivers of vehicles bearing "Z", "V", and "O" symbols would be detained and questioned as to the reasons.
- Kyrgyzstan – police departments have restricted the "Z" symbol from being displayed on vehicles in public.
- Latvia – for glorifying military aggression and war crimes, the "Z" and "V" symbols were added by the Saeima to a list of banned political symbols. The list had already included the swastika, as well as the hammer and sickle.
- Lithuania – on 19 April 2022, Lithuania banned the "Z" and "V" symbols together with the ribbon of Saint George.
- Moldova – since 7 April 2022, the symbols "Z" and "V" and the ribbon of Saint George are banned in Moldova.
- Poland – from 13 April 2022, "whoever uses or promotes symbols or names supporting the aggression of the Russian Federation against Ukraine shall be liable to a fine, restriction of liberty or imprisonment for up to 2 years".
- Ukraine – on 22 May 2022, the Verkhovna Rada banned the symbols "Z" and "V" used to promote the 2022 invasion of Ukraine, but agreed with President Volodymyr Zelenskyy to allow their use for educational or historical purposes.

=== By organizations ===
==== Sporting ====
While participating in the 2022 FIG Artistic Gymnastics World Cup series during the invasion, Russian gymnast Ivan Kuliak wore a shirt with a taped-on "Z" symbol while standing beside Ukrainian gymnast Illia Kovtun on the podium. Kovtun won the gold medal, while Kuliak won the bronze. The International Gymnastics Federation (FIG) denounced Kuliak's "shocking behaviour" and stated that it would request "disciplinary proceedings" against him from the Gymnastics Ethics Foundation. On 7 March, the FIG banned Russian and Belarusian gymnasts and officials from taking part in its competitions. On 17 May 2022, the FIG sanctioned Kuliak with a one-year ban, ending either on 17 May 2023 or six months after the removal of the then-active blanket ban (Note: The ban had not applied during the competition itself as it was only scheduled to take effect on 7 March.) on Russian athletes, whichever was later. He was also stripped of his bronze medal and prize money.

Virtus.pro professional Dota 2 esports player Ivan "Pure" Moskalenko allegedly drew the "Z" on the game map during a qualifying match for the Dota Pro Circuit. After drawing criticism from the community, the team was disqualified from the circuit.

==== Business ====
For sensitivity reasons, several companies have voluntarily removed uses of the letter Z from logos and product names, even if they predate the invasion, including Latvian armored vehicle manufacturer Dartz, Zurich Insurance (which suspended the use of its logo containing an encircled "Z" on social media), and Samsung Electronics (which has re-branded several Samsung Galaxy Z-brand smartphones when promoted in the Baltic states). In March 2022, Ocado launched a new sub-division called Zoom, which had a 'Z' logo that had to be changed, after social media users said it looked like the Russian symbol.

In Lappeenranta, Finland, after receiving complaints by local residents, a transport company decided to change the "Z" route of its buses into "X", to avoid associations with the Russian invasion of Ukraine due to the Z letter being used in Russian propaganda.

In April 2022, Singaporean transportation company ComfortDelGro announced that they would remove the "Z" letter from its Zig Booking App in order to prevent "possible misunderstandings" with the Russian military symbol.

In June 2022, Japanese low-cost airline Zipair Tokyo announced that the large letter "Z" on the tail of all its planes would be replaced with a green geometric pattern to avoid confusion with the Russian military symbol.

== See also ==
=== Other symbols ===
- Chevron (insignia) § Other uses as insignia
- Soviet imagery during the Russo-Ukrainian War

=== Related ideologies ===
- Rashism
- Russian irredentism

=== Specific uses ===
- Storm-Z
- Z-patriots
- Z with stroke
