= Mark One =

Mark One may refer to:

- MK One, fashion retailer, formerly known as Mark One
- MRK1, musician
- Mark One Foods, makers of Candwich

== See also ==
- Mark I (disambiguation), including Mark 1, Mk.1, Mk.I
