= Northern Kosovo clashes =

Clash between Serbs and NATO peacekeepers in Northern Kosovo

North Kosovo clashes
- Part of North Kosovo crisis (2022–2026)
- KFOR peacekeepers clashing with Serbian protesters
Date	26 and 29 May 2023
Location	Zvečan, North Kosovo
Result	NATO increases its presence in Kosovo; Serbian Armed Forces are put on "highest alert"

Belligerents
Serb protesters	NATO; Kosovo

Commanders and leaders
Unorganized	Angelo Michele Ristuccia

Units involved
Northern Brigade; Civilna Zaštita	Kosovo Force; Kosovo Police

Casualties and losses
Per Serbia: 55+ protesters injured 7 protesters arrested	40–93 wounded 5 police officers wounded Multiple police cars destroyed

On 26 May 2023, Kosovo Police forcefully took control of the municipal buildings of four Serb majority regions in Northern Kosovo after a local election was held. Three days later on 29 May 2023, hundreds of Serbian protesters clashed with KFOR peacekeeping troops after rally at city hall in the town of Zvečan in Northern Kosovo.

== Background ==
=== Local elections ===
On 23 April 2023, Kosovo held 2023 Kosovan local elections in four of its northern municipalities. The local election were initially planned to be in December 2022, but they were subsequently postponed. The four municipalities of Leposavić, North Mitrovica, Zubin Potok and Zvečan all have a Serb majority population. Among the election's declared candidates, only two of them were Serbs and the rest were Albanian. Serbian president Aleksandar Vucic called on ethnic Serbs in the regions to boycott the elections, saying that the Serbs of Northern Kosovo should no longer tolerate a "foreign occupation." All of the elected officials of the municipalities were Albanians.

== Clashes ==
On 26 May 2023, Kosovo Police took control of the municipal buildings in Zvečan, Zubin Potok and Leposavić by force after ethnic Serbs had refused to let the newly elected officials assume office. Protestors in Zvečan attempted to stop Kosovar police from escorting the mayor to the city hall leaving 10 protesters and 5 police officers injured. Multiple police cars were also destroyed. The Kosovar Police's use of force against the protesters was condemned by the United States and the EU. On 29 May 2023, hundreds of Serbian protesters rallied at the city hall in the town of Zvečan in Northern Kosovo. The protestors demanded the withdrawal of Kosovo police forces and for the resignation of ethnic Albanian officials who were elected to the mayor's offices in April. The crowd of protesters then spread a huge Serbian flag outside the city hall. NATO peacekeeping soldiers responded by firing tear gas and stun grenades in order to protect Kosovar police officers and disperse protesters. The protesters then responded by throwing rocks, molotov cocktails and other objects at peacekeepers and police officers. Protesters then painted the Russian Z symbol on Kosovo police and NATO peacekeepers' vehicles. KFOR soldiers then moved in with riot shields and batons in another attempt to disperse the crowd. Protesters responded by hurling rocks, bottles and molotov cocktails at the soldiers.

== Aftermath ==
=== Casualties ===
==== NATO and Kosovo ====
Per the Kosovo Police, 5 officers were wounded during the clashes. Per the Hungarian ministry of defense, 20 Hungarian soldiers were wounded with 7 in serious condition. Italian foreign minister Antonio Tajani reported that 11 Italian soldiers were wounded with 3 in serious condition. The Italian ministry of defence reported that 14 Italian soldiers were wounded and that Moldovan soldiers were also wounded. On 5 June 2023, NATO reported that around 40 KFOR peacekeeping troops had been injured. On the one year anniversary of the clashes, Balkan Insight and KoSSev reported that 93 NATO soldiers had been wounded during the clashes. On 12 October 2024, Reuters reported that "more than 90 soldiers were injured when Serb protesters attacked NATO peacekeepers."

==== Protesters ====
Serbian president Aleksandar Vucic claimed that over 50 Serbian protesters were injured in the clashes with 3 of them in serious condition. One of the protesters, a Kosovo Serb named Nenad Orlović, was sentenced to 15 months in prison for attacking KFOR soldiers. 5 other protesters were also arrested. Later on 29 April 2026, a seventh protester, Slobodan Radenkovic, was sentenced to 2 years in prison and handed an 15,000-euro fine due to Radenkovic pleading guilty to attacking KFOR peacekeepers during the protest around the Zvecan municipality building.

=== Novak Djokovic controversy ===
After beating American tennis player Aleksandar Kovacevic in the first round of the 2023 French Open on 30 May 2023, Serbian tennis player Novak Djokovic wrote: "Kosovo is the heart of Serbia. Stop the violence" on a camera lens in Serbian, referencing the clashes on the day prior. Djokovic's father grew up in Zvečan where the clashes on May 26 and May 29 took place. The Tennis Federation of Kosovo accused Novak Djokovic of "aggravating an already tense situation". Djokovic responded to this saying: "As a son of a man born in Kosovo, I feel the need to give my support to our people and to entire Serbia. My stance is clear: I am against wars, violence and any kind of conflict, as I've always stated publicly. I empathize with all people, but the situation with Kosovo is a precedent in international law". Jeton Hadergjonaj, the president of the Tennis Federation of Kosovo, responded to Djokovic's statement saying: "The comments made by Novak Djokovic at the end of his Roland Garros match against Aleksandar Kovacevic, his statements at the post-match press conference and his Instagram post are regrettable." He also accused Novak Djokovic of using his popularity to stir tensions. Djokovic then said in an interview on 31 May 2023 that he stands by his comment stating: "I would say it again, but I don't need to because you have my quotes if you want to reflect on that. Of course I'm aware that a lot of people would disagree, but it is what it is. It's something that I stand for. So that's all."

== Reactions ==
=== Serbia ===
- : Serbian president Aleksandar Vucic claimed in a statement that the consequences of the clashes are "big and grave" and the sole culprit is the Kosovo Prime Minister, Albin Kurti. He also said: "I repeat for the last time and I beg the international community to make sure Albin Kurti sees reason. If they don’t, I am afraid it will be too late for all of us." He also claimed that Kurti was attempting to draw NATO and Serbia into a war saying: "In the last three days, anyone could understand what was being prepared for today in Kosovo. Everything was organised by Albin Kurti, everything with his desire to bring about a big conflict between Serbs and NATO". Vucic's office then released a statement saying that he had put the Serbian Armed Forces on the "highest level alert" in response to the violence.
- (Serbia) : Serbian prime minister Ana Brnabic criticized the international handling of the clashes in Northern Kosovo saying that KFOR was "not protecting the people, they are protecting the usurpers". She then said: "But we must protect the peace. Peace is all we have".
- (Serbia) : Serbian defense minister Milos Vucevic, criticized KFOR, saying their position "looks like they are protecting the police from unarmed people."

=== Kosovo ===
- : Kosovo's President Vjosa Osmani accused Serbia of attempting to destabilize Kosovo. He then posted on Twitter: "Serb illegal structures turned into criminal gangs have attacked Kosovo police, KFOR (peacekeeping) officers & journalists. Those who carry out Vucic's orders to destabilize the north of Kosovo, must face justice".
- : Kosovo's Prime Minister Albin Kurti stated that he would not "surrender the country to a fascist Serbian militia". Kurti then told CNN: "“We are not facing peaceful protesters, we are facing a mob of extremists. This is a fascist militia who attacked our policemen and NATO soldiers – and journalists who were on the ground reporting."

=== International ===
- United States: American ambassador to Kosovo Jeffrey Hovenier after exiting a meeting with Kosovar president Vjosa Osmani said that they had a "shared concern of the prospect of violence and the need to de-escalate." Later on 31 May 2023, Hovenier said that the United States "foresaw the consequences of the decision to forcibly install ethnic-Albanian mayors in four majority-Serb municipalities". He also said that US government had penalized Kosovo by canceling Kosovo's participation in a United States led military drill in Europe.
- Italy: Italian prime minister Giorgia Meloni condemned the violence calling it "absolutely unacceptable and irresponsible". She also said: "It is vital to avoid further unilateral actions on the part of the Kosovar authorities and that all the parties in question immediately take a step back to ease the tensions."
- France: French president Emmanuel Macron said the unrest "has increased sharply since ethnic Albanian mayors took office."
- Russia: The Russian foreign ministry stated: "We call on the West to finally halt its deceitful propaganda and stop blaming the incidents in Kosovo on desperate Serbs, who are trying to defend their legitimate rights and freedom peacefully and without weapons." Russian foreign minister Sergei Lavrov said the situation in Kosovo was "alarming" and that it could provoke "another conflict in the heart of Europe."
- China: Chinese Communist Party spokeswoman Mao Ning criticized NATO and the Kosovo Police's handling of the situation, saying that it was a "failure to respect Serbian political rights." She also said: "We urge NATO to earnestly respect the sovereignty and territorial integrity of the relevant countries and truly do what is conducive to regional peace".
- NATO: On 5 June 2023, Nato announced that it was sending additional reinforcements to Kosovo following the "unprovoked and unacceptable violence which left almost 40 KFOR peacekeeping troops injured". The bulk of the new forces deployed were from the Turkish 65th Mechanized Infantry Brigade.
- EU: EU foreign policy chief Josep Borrell said that the situation was "dangerous and unsustainable" and that urgent de-escalation was needed.
