= MKL =

MKL may refer to:

== Places ==
- McKellar-Sipes Regional Airport (FAA airport code MKL), Jackson, Madison County, Tennessee, USA
- Morakale station (station code MKL), Colombo, Sri Lanka; see List of railway stations in Sri Lanka by line
- Kuala Lumpur Tower (KL Tower; Malay: Menara Kuala Lumpur, MKL), Kuala Lumpur, Malaysia

== Computing and software ==
- Math Kernel Library, an Intel software library
- Multiple kernel learning in machine learning

== Groups, organizations ==
- McCall Aviation (ICAO airline code MKL), see List of airline codes (M)
- Markel Group (stock ticker MKL), a U.S. conglomerate
- Mysore Kirloskar Ltd, a subsidiary of Kirloskar Group
- MY Honor of Kings League (MKL), an e-sports league for Honor of Kings
- Lietuvos moksleivių krepšinio lyga (MLK; Lithuanian: Lithuanian Pupils Basketball League)

== Other uses ==
- Mokole language (Benin) (ISO 639 language code mkl)
- Medium Head Kel-Lite (MKL), a flashlight
- Mark Lottor (mkl), an artist in hacker culture

== See also ==
- MK1 (disambiguation)
- MKL (disambiguation)
