= Combat (World of Darkness) =

Combat is a 1996 role-playing game supplement published by White Wolf Publishing for World of Darkness.

== Contents ==
Combat is a supplement in which a catalogue of combat rules is offered for players who crave intricate—and brutal—fighting mechanics for the World of Darkness. Across 100 pages, the book delivers graphic illustrations and a large array of combat maneuvers that can be purchased using "Power Points" based on a character's attributes (e.g., dots in Brawl translate to available points). Combat Cards help players track these maneuvers. The supplement describes over 100 weapon and unarmed techniques, covering modifiers to initiative, damage, movement, and more. There is guidance on chaining maneuvers together and creating new ones, for players seeking personalized fighting styles. Expanding further, it explores 30 combat styles, from classic disciplines like karate and boxing to supernatural systems tailored to vampires, werewolves, and mages. Advice on integrating special powers into fights is presented. Appendices add new hit locations for realistic damage modeling, sample characters, and weapon techniques sorted by type—with lethal gear, including incendiary shells.

== Reception ==
Mark Barter reviewed Combat for Arcane magazine, rating it a 5 out of 10 overall, and stated that "So what has this bruiser got in its favour? The new rules are clearly explained, allowing almost any combat style or move to be incorporated. The biggest payoff is that it opens up your options, giving combat more flavour and characters more style. Whether it's useful is down to how important combat is in your FS. campaign, and whether you think the new options are really worth this much work."

== Reviews ==
- Dragão Brasil #67 (Oct 2000) p. 6
- Dosdediez V2 #10 (Jul 1999) p. 24
