= Kombat Armouring =

- Type: Private
- Industry: Automotive
- Founded: 1985
- Headquarters: Saint Petersburg, Russia,
- Key people: Mikhail Gorbachev; Founder
- Products: Automobiles
- Website: www.armoringgroup.org

Kombat Armouring is a Russian armoured vehicle and car manufacturer. The first prototype was called the Laura. The company's slogan is Protection without Compromise.

== History ==
The Laura was followed by the Ohta minivan in 1987. In 1990, Kombat Armouring acquired a military factory in Saint Petersburg, where it still produces vehicles today. From 1993 onwards, Kombat Armouring has been producing armoured vehicles for local courier services. From 1995–1998 they produced the Laura 3 which was based on the Pontiac Fiero.

== Models ==
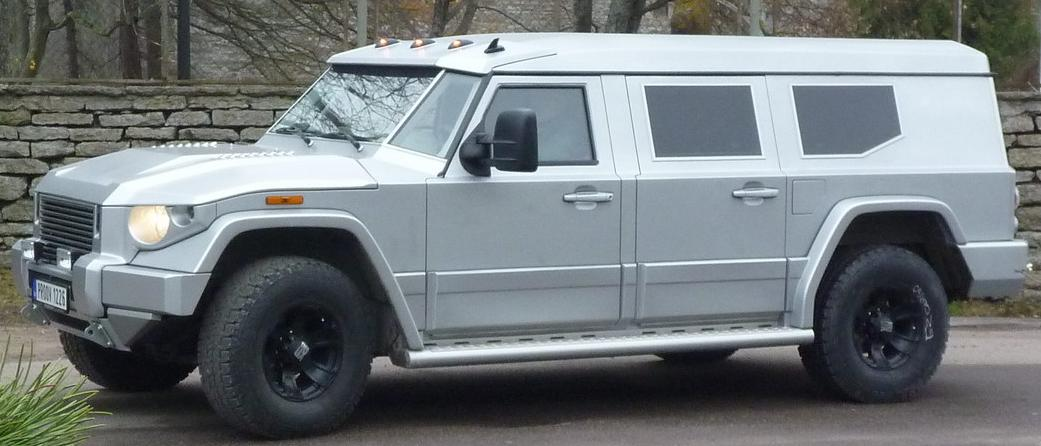
T-98 Kombat

- Laura (1985)
- Ohto (1987)
- Luaz-Proto (1988)
- Kamas (1989)
- Pilot (1990)
- Laura 3 (1995)
- Kanonir (1998)
- Cornet
- Gelendvagen
- T-98 Kombat (2005)

== See also ==
- Dartz
