= Cooper-Bristol T20/25 =

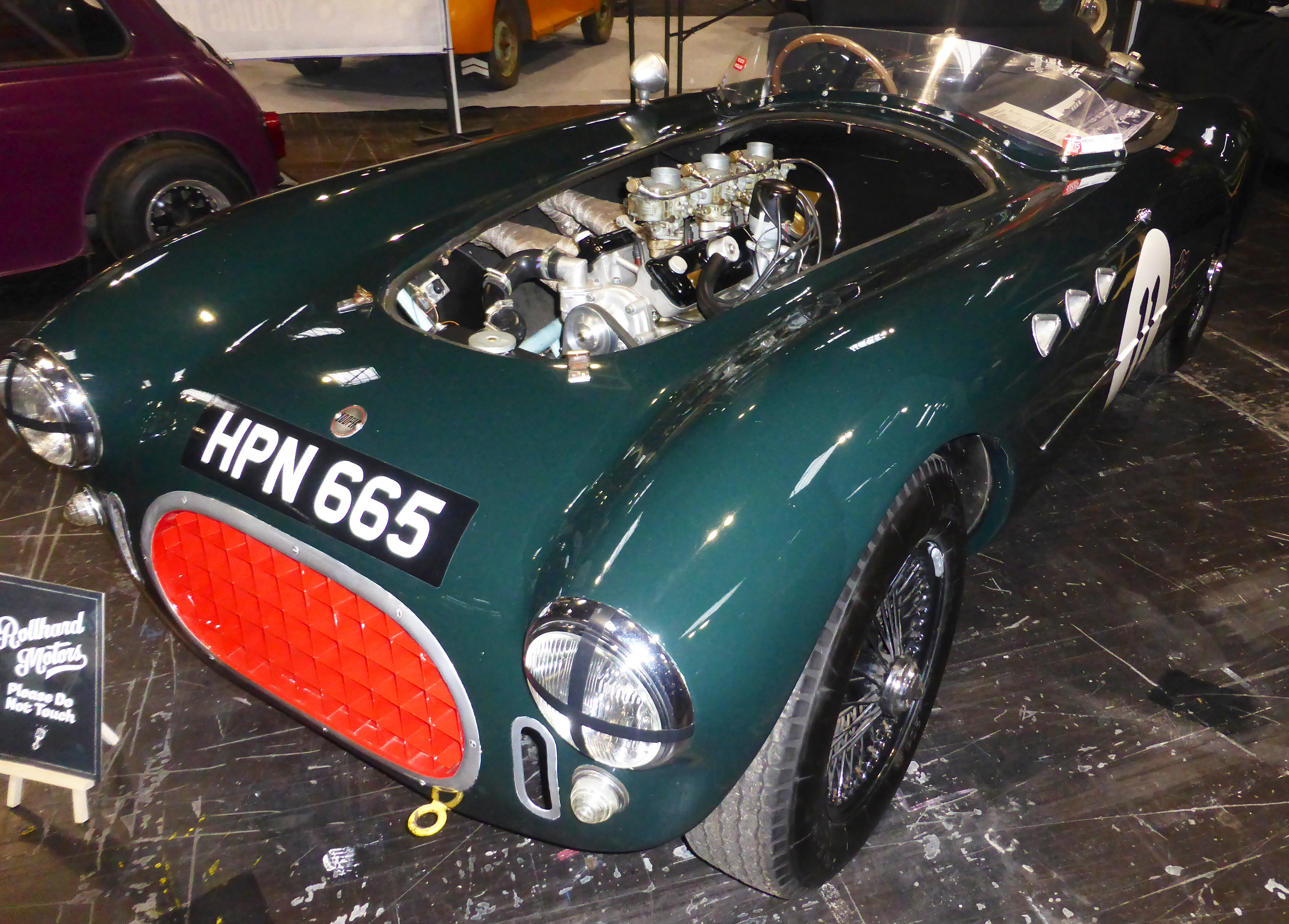
Front view

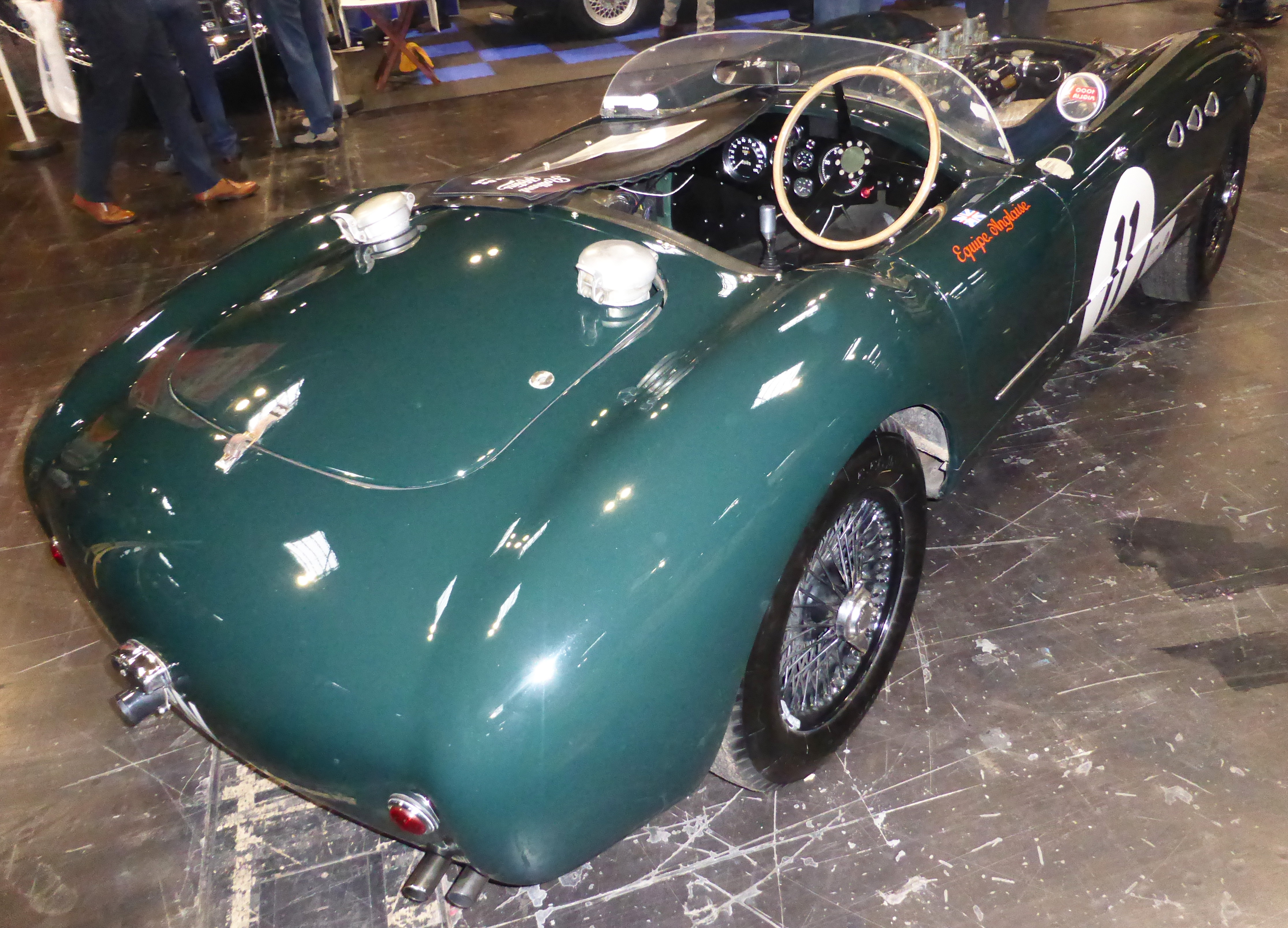
Rear view

The Cooper-Bristol T20/25, also known as the Cooper Mk.1, is a sports car made by British manufacturer Cooper Cars in 1952. It is based on the chassis of the Cooper T20 Formula 2 car, but with enclosed wheels. It used the same 2-liter, 6-cylinder, Bristol engine as the T20.
