= Cooper Mark I =

1947 British sports car

The Cooper Mark I, also known as the T4 (Type 4), was a lightweight sports car, designed, developed, and built by British manufacturer Cooper in 1947. It was based on the chassis of the open-wheel Cooper 500, but with enclosed bodywork. It was powered by a Triumph Twin engine, making about 27 hp (20 kW). It shared many Fiat parts and components, like its predecessor. An aluminum panel body covered the tubular space frame chassis. Only one car was ever built, which is still in existence.
