= Mortal =

Mortal may refer to:

- Mortal (band), a Christian industrial band
- The Mortal, a Japanese band led by Atsushi Sakurai
- Mortal (novel), a science fiction fantasy novel by Ted Dekker and Tosca Lee
- Mortals (novel), a 2003 novel by Norman Rush
- Mortal (film), a 2020 adventure film
- "Mortal" (Smallville), an episode of the television series Smallville
- Mortal (gamer), an Indian YouTuber and esports player

== See also ==
- Immortality, the concept of eternal life
- Mortal Kombat, a fighting game series
- Mortal Online, a 2010 video game by Star Vault
- Mortality (disambiguation)
