= Kombat (photograph) =

World War II photograph

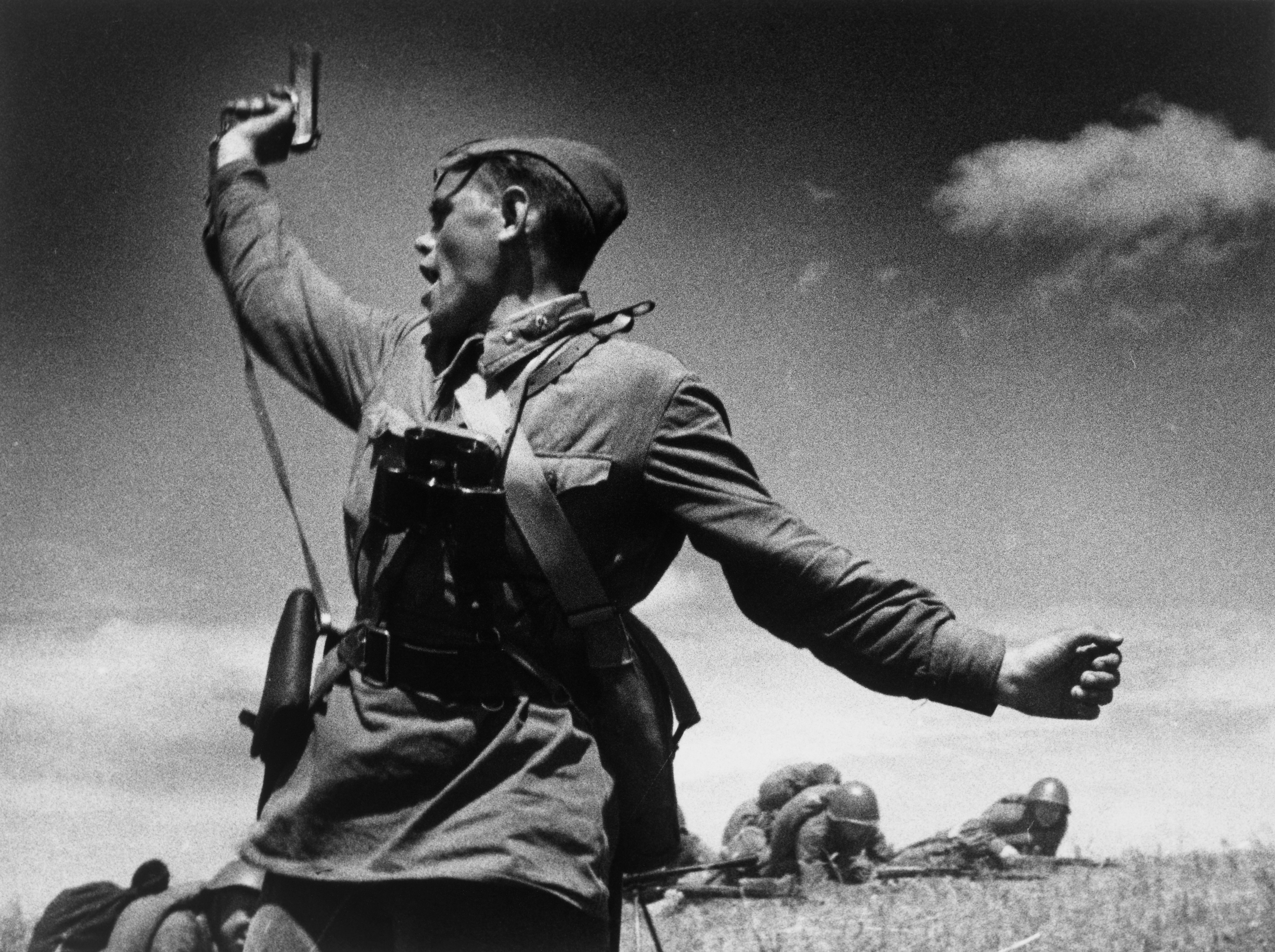
Kombat

Kombat (Russian: Комбат, lit. 'battalion commander') is a black-and-white photograph by the Soviet photographer Max Alpert. It depicts a Soviet military officer armed with a TT pistol who is raising his unit for an attack during World War II. The work is regarded as one of the most iconic Soviet World War II photographs, but neither the date nor the subject is known with certainty. According to the most widely-accepted version, the photograph depicts a political commissar, Aleksei Yeryomenko, minutes before his death, on 12 July 1942 in Voroshilovgrad Oblast (now Luhansk Oblast), Ukraine.

== History ==
Over the years, Alpert gave several contradictory versions of the event, with its time ranging from autumn 1941 to 1943. Alpert was consistent in that he did not know the officer's name and that the photograph's title Kombat ('commander of a battalion') was likely inaccurate since after he took it, he overheard that "the kombat is killed" and tentatively associated the message with the subject of the photograph. After the war, Alpert received numerous letters claiming identification of the officer, but only one was confirmed by a joint investigation by Komsomolskaya Pravda and that administration of Luhansk Oblast, which was undertaken in the 1970s. According to the reconstructed version, Yeryomenko was the political commissar in his unit. When the commander was wounded, he took command and raised the unit for a counterattack against the German offensive. He then died within minutes.

== Legacy ==
The photograph was reused in numerous publications, sculptures, artworks, and commercial products, both in the Soviet Union and abroad.

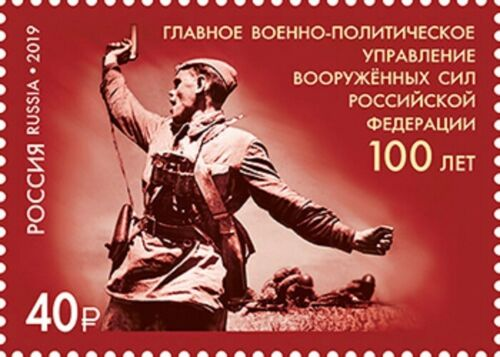
2019 stamp dedicated to the 100th anniversary of the Political Directorate of the Russian Army and featuring the Kombat photo

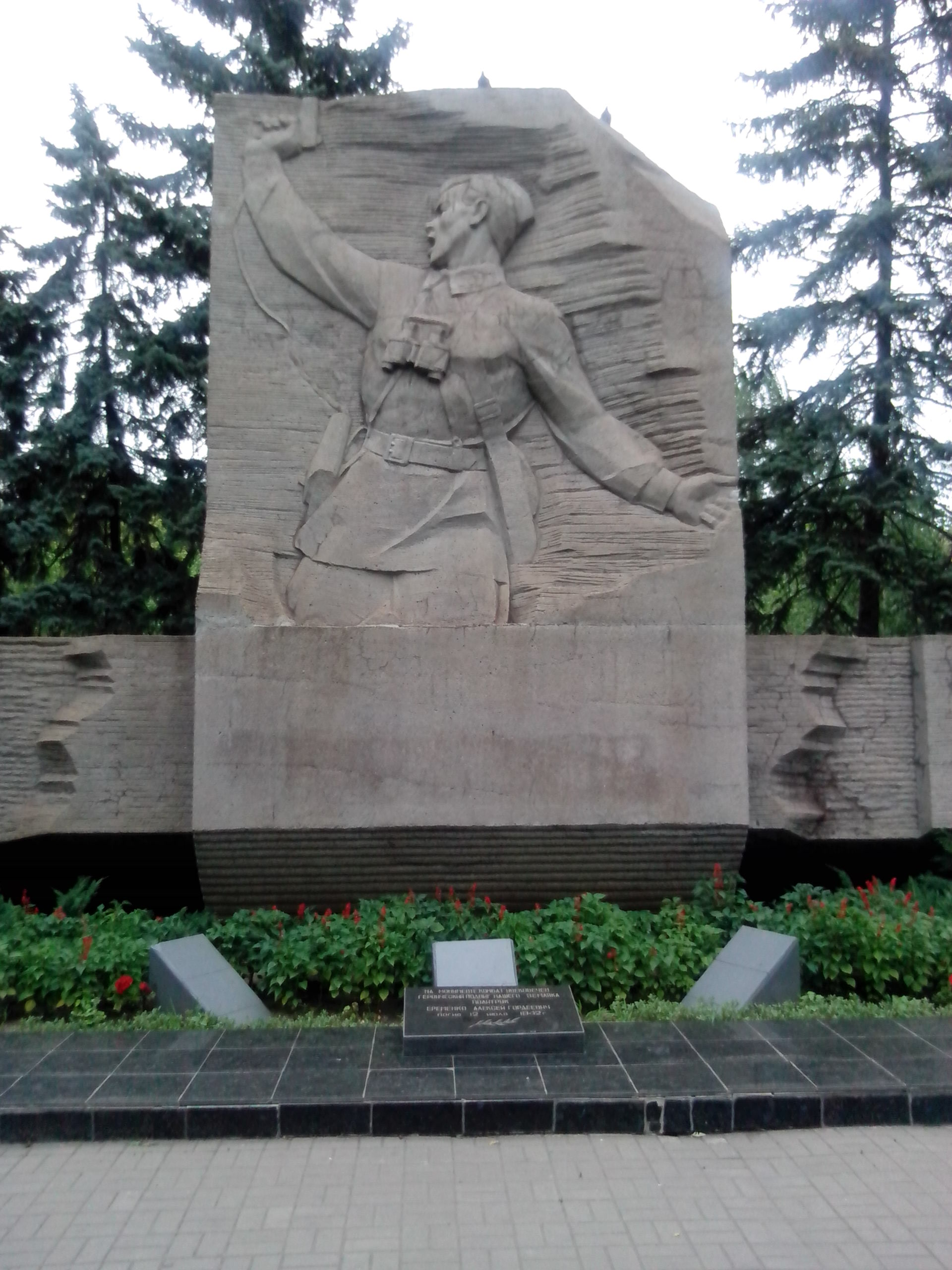
Bas-relief in the Avenue of Glory in Zaporizhzhia, Ukraine

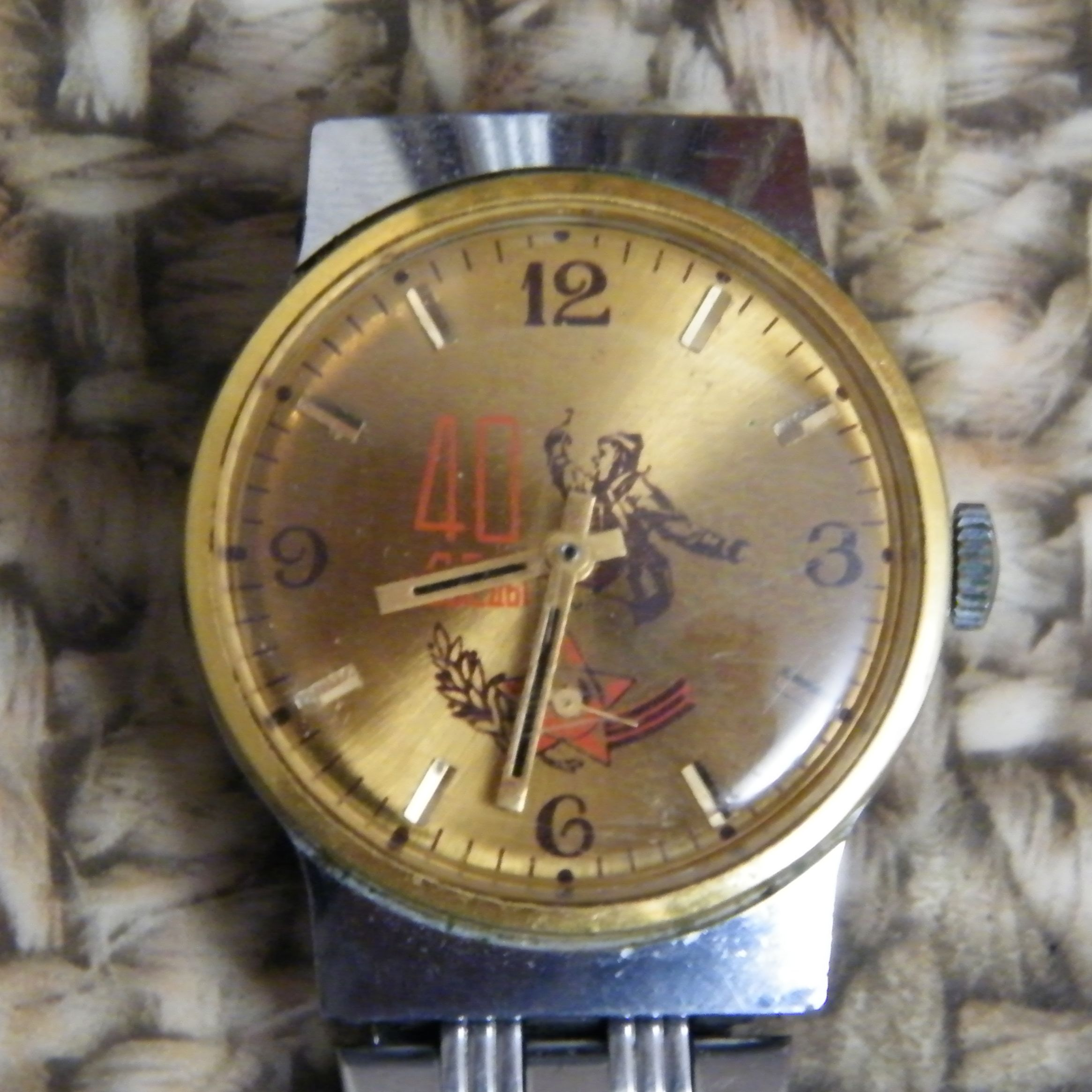
Commemorative wristwatch Pobeda (“Victory”) issued in 1985

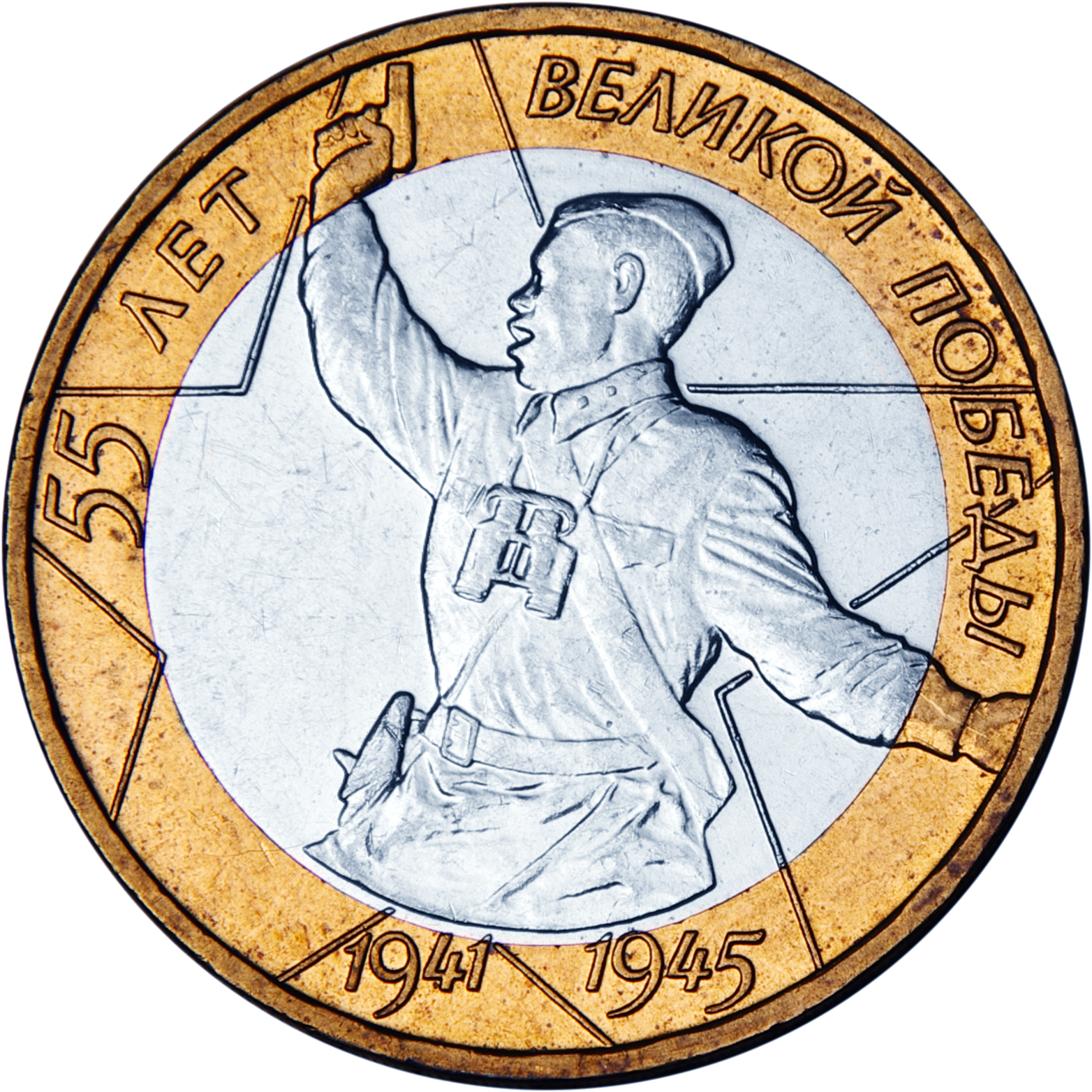
Commemorative Russian 10 ruble coin, 2000: "55 years of Great Victory"
- Relief on the Alley of Military Glory in Zaporizhzhia, created based on the famous photograph.
- An image of a political instructor, based on the photo, was the emblem of Donetsk Higher Military-Political School of Engineering and Signal Corps and other military and political schools of the Soviet Union.
- The image was used on a postage stamp of the Republic of Congo in 1985, dedicated to the 40th anniversary of Victory Day.
- In Chelyabinsk, the image was used to create metal bas-relief in memory of the victory in the Great Patriotic War. The bas-relief is located at the end of a nine-story residential building at Molodogvardeytsev Street, House 48; at the intersection of Molodogvardeytsev and Victory Avenue. During the construction of additional buildings to the complex in the late 1990s, the bas was dismantled and in its place a new, slightly different one was installed.
- The image was used on the cover of the board game Cross of Iron, published by Avalon Hill in 1979, which covers small-unit combat on the Eastern Front in World War II.
