= Mortal Kombat (disambiguation) =

Mortal Kombat is an American video game franchise created by Ed Boon and John Tobias.

Mortal Kombat or Mortal Combat, may also refer to:

== Mortal Kombat franchise ==
- Mortal Kombat (1992 video game), the first game in the Mortal Kombat series of games
- Mortal Kombat: The Album, a 1994 album accompaniment to the video game series
- Mortal Kombat (1995 film), a film adaptation based on the first video game
- Mortal Kombat Annihilation, the second installment in film series and a sequel to the original 1995 film
- Mortal Kombat: Conquest, a 1998 television adaptation based on the video game franchise
- Mortal Kombat (2011 video game), a reboot for the PlayStation 3 and Xbox 360
- Mortal Kombat (2021 film), a reboot of the Mortal Kombat film series

== Other uses ==
=== Mortal Combat ===
- Mortal Combat, alternate title of the 1978 film Crippled Avengers
- "Mortal Combat of Light and Shadow", an episode of Beast King GoLion (1981–1982)
- "Mortal Combat", an episode from season 2 of Eli Stone (2008–09)
- "Mortal Combat", a song from Big Daddy Kane's album It's a Big Daddy Thing

== See also ==
- Immortal Kombat (disambiguation)
- Immortal Combat (disambiguation)
- Moral Combat (disambiguation)
- Portal Kombat
