= T-98 Kombat =

Russian-built armoured fighting vehicle

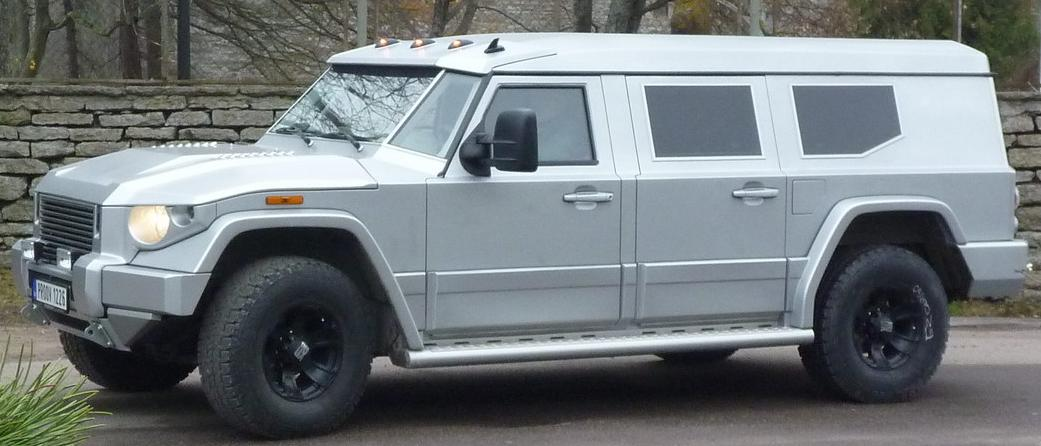
- T-98 Kombat in 2011
- Type: Armoured personnel carrier
- Place of origin: Russia

Production history
- Designer: Kombat Armouring
- Designed: 1990s
- Manufacturer: Kombat Armouring (Laura Group)
- Produced: 1999–present
- Variants: VIP; Utility

Specifications
- Mass: 3750 kg (Hard Top B6); 4150 kg (Station Wagon B6)
- Length: 5150 mm (Hard Top B6); 5350 mm (Station Wagon B6)
- Width: 2100 mm
- Height: 1950 mm (Hard Top B6); 2100 mm (Station Wagon B6)
- Crew: 2 + passengers (varies by configuration)
- Armor: Metal–ceramic composite; monocoque steel body
- Main armament: Optional: 14.5 mm KPVT machine gun; 12.7 mm Kord machine gun
- Secondary armament: 30 mm AGS‑17 grenade launcher (optional)
- Engine: 8.1 L Vortec 8100 V8; 6.6 L Duramax Turbo Diesel V8 * 340 hp @ 4200 rpm (Vortec); 300 hp @ 3100 rpm (Duramax)
- Suspension: Independent front; multileaf rear
- Ground clearance: 300 mm
- Fuel capacity: 140 L
- Operational range: Not published
- Maximum speed: 180 km/h (111 mph) with 8.1 L Vortec V8

The T-98 Kombat is a wheeled armoured vehicle built by Kombat Armouring, a subsidiary of Laura Group, in Saint Petersburg, Russia. The name (Russian: комбат, IPA: [kɐmˈba:t]) is shorthand for "komandir batalyona" (командир батальона – battalion commander).

There are two basic versions of the T‑98 Kombat based on General Motors components, including an 8.1‑litre Vortec engine, Allison 1000 automatic transmission, and General Motors heavy‑duty suspension systems. All running gear and electronics are supplied by General Motors. The two versions are:

- The “VIP”: a monocoque double‑steel body with optional composite ceramic armour and luxury interior options.
- The “Utility”: designed for special operations missions.

The armoured body uses a "metal‑ceramic sandwich with cellular filler" structure. The monocoque design provides protection against mine blasts. Kombat Armouring claims that the highest‑protection configuration can withstand 12.7 mm rounds, shotguns, mines, and ramming.

A 340 hp V8 gives the lightest T‑98 a top speed of 111 mph (180 km/h), making it one of the fastest all‑terrain armoured vehicles in the world.

== Versions ==
1. High‑mobility armoured vehicle (5‑door station wagon)
2. Armoured troop carrier (3‑door panel truck)
3. Fast attack vehicle (4‑door pickup truck)
4. Infantry vehicle for special operations (2‑door pickup truck)

== Armament ==
- Vehicle‑mounted 23 mm autocannon
- 14.5 mm machine gun (KPVT)
- 12.7 mm machine gun (KORD)
- 55 mm remotely operated smoke grenade launcher

== Operators ==
Most are VIP versions sold to the United Arab Emirates, Saudi Arabia, Estonia, Russia, Mauritius, and the United States.

== In popular culture ==
- A gold‑coloured T‑98 Kombat appears in the 2012 comedy The Dictator.
- The T‑98 Kombat appears in the 2014 action film The November Man.
- A similar armoured SUV appears in Grand Theft Auto Online as the HVY Nightshark.
