= Steven Meyer =

Steven Meyer may refer to:

- Steven E. Meyer, American former intelligence official and academic
- Steven P. Meyer, American jurist and politician
