= Partition of Kosovo =

Proposals for the division of Kosovo

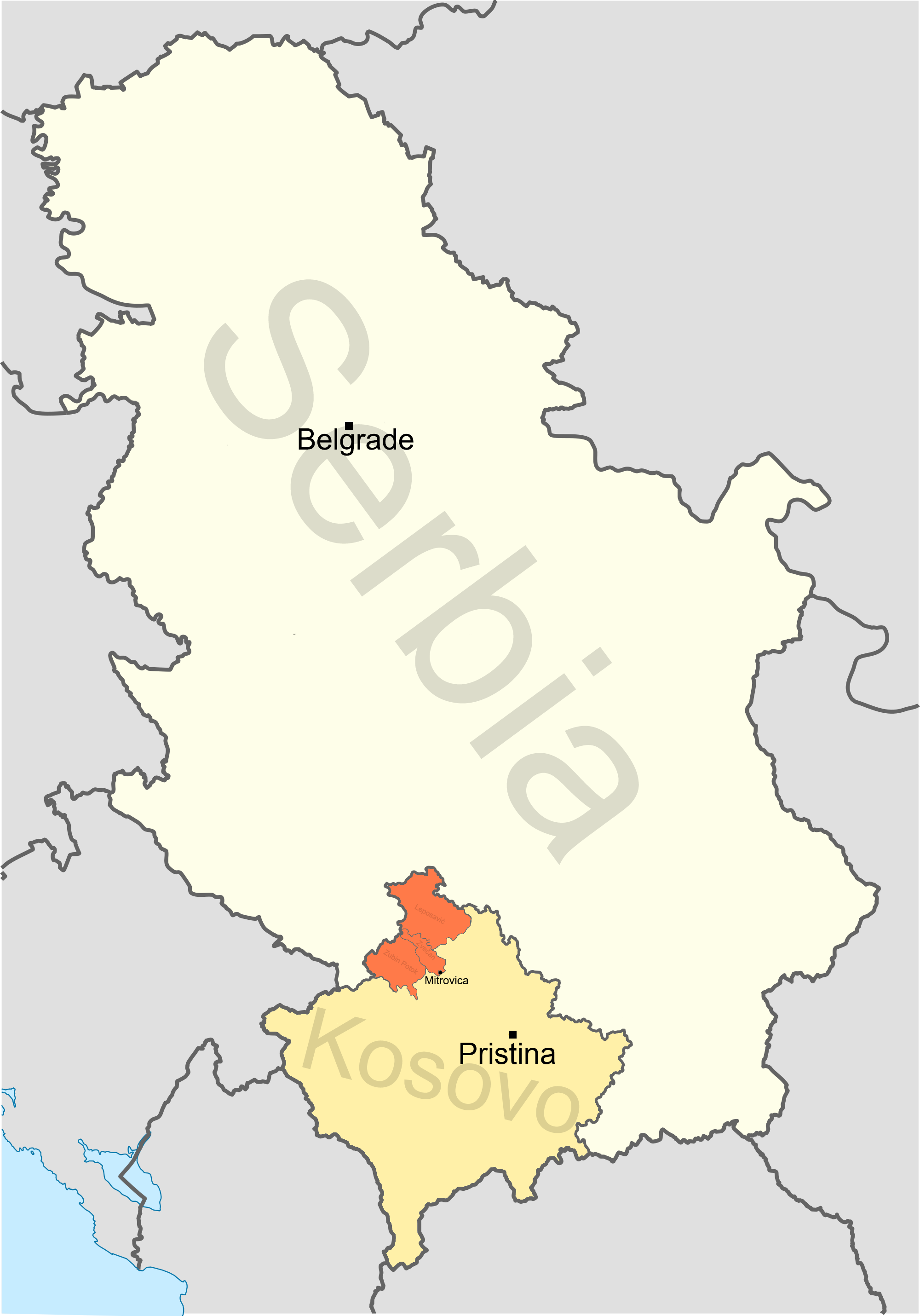
Map of North Kosovo, in orange, showing the divided city of Kosovska Mitrovica

The partition of Kosovo has been suggested as a solution to the Kosovo question between Serbia and Kosovo. A possible partition would be the division of Kosovo along ethnic lines, such as separating Serb majority North Kosovo, and possibly some enclaves in the south, from the rest of Albanian-dominated Kosovo. A partition was proposed several times, even before the 2008 Kosovo declaration of independence, although the question has most recently been raised after the 2011–2013 North Kosovo crisis.

== History ==
=== Proposals during the 1990s ===
Serbian politician Dobrica Ćosić initially proposed the "delineanation with the Croats and the Albanians" in 1990, stating that "Kosovo can not be preserved. It is realistic to delineate, while retaining the coal [mines] and sanctities", according to Bora Jović. Branislav Krstić proposed partition in 1992, worked on further variants in 1993, and finally submitted a draft to the government in 1994. His 1992 proposal included giving autonomy based on the Vance–Owen plan, while Serb and Montenegrin areas be integrated into the state. In 1996, Aleksandar Despić expressed his thoughts on that Kosovo should be divided.

During the Kosovo War in 1998, Dušan Bataković was the organizer of the proposal of "cantonization". In 1999 that proposal was submitted to the French government. It was not accepted by the international community. That year, Bernard Kushner proposed the creation of Serb safety zones.

On April 30, 1999, Margaret Thatcher, the former Prime Minister of the United Kingdom (1979–1990), gave a speech in which she strongly opposed a partition.

=== Proposals in the aftermath of the Kosovo War ===
Vice-president of the Serbian government Nebojša Čović proposed on 18 May 2001 that two entities, a Serbian and an Albanian, be established on Kosovo and Metohija. The Serbian entity would be under the protection of the Yugoslav Army and police, while the Albanian entity would have the highest grade of autonomy and stay under the protection of international powers.

In 2002, Serbian Prime Minister Zoran Đinđić stated that "Serbia has neither the mechanism nor the resources to reintegrate Kosovo into its legal system, or to create a form in which it will be under its sovereignty. The division of the province, therefore, is nothing else than an attempt to rescue what can still be saved."

The policy of partitioning Kosovo and unification of Republika Srpska with Serbia was seen as offering "long-term security and stability for the region", according to Aleksandar Jokic (2003).

In 2004, Anatol Lieven of the Carnegie Endowment for International Peace stated that the "Partition of Kosovo is the most realistic solution, but the Albanians' insisting on independence will lead to a new conflict." Čedomir Antić of G17 Plus said that the "Partition of Kosmet is not an ideal solution, but it is the maximum that can be obtained at this time." Albanologist Miranda Vickers said that the partition of Kosovo would be the best solution.

In 2005, part of the Serbia-Kosovo negotiation was the Serbian side's call for the establishment of Serb municipalities and constitutional and legal protection of Serbs. UN Special Representative (UNOSEK) Jessen-Petersen and Kosovo speaker Daci reiterated the ruling out of partition. Contact Groups' German representative Michael Scheffer also stressed that there should be no division. CIA Deputy Chief of the Balkan Task Force Steven E. Meyer stated that "The Government of Serbia should not forget about a division of Kosovo, which no one in the international community would support, nor dismiss as a solution. Changing borders has never been the Holy Scripture of the EU and the UN." Charles A. Kupchan of the Council on Foreign Relations said that "Giving northern Kosovo, Pristina will be freed from futile attempts to establish rule over a province intending to maintain ties with Belgrade." Serbian intellectual Desimir Tošić said that he supported the option of partition, "but that now there is very little chance, because Serbia will never return to Serbia in the state of 1912, 1918 or 1945."

In 2006, Sanda Rašković-Ivić, President of the Coordination Centre for Kosovo and Metohija, said that "If both sides, both Serbs and Albanians, face the fact that for both living in cohabitation is impossible, and if the international community is faces the same fact, then a kind of partition of Kosovo would represent a solution for both sides." Slobodan Samardžić, adviser to the Serbian PM, said that a long-term solution would be partition, "given the fact that the Albanians so far clearly do not want to live with the Serbs."

In 2007, political analyst Andrey Piontkovsky said that "Serbia needs to stand up for the partition of Kosovo with the argument that there are no international forces that can keep Kosovo Serbs safe in an independent Kosovo." Law professor Timothy William Waters said that "The division is possible and it is possible that this is the right thing to do." Erhard Busek said that "the partition of Kosovo is perhaps the least bad solution". Ivor Roberts, the former British Ambassador to Yugoslavia, supports the partition of Kosovo, stating that "the Partition of Kosovo will please neither side, but the equality of pain is more likely to lead to stability than present Western plans which will undoubtedly destabilise Serbia, and through Serbia the whole region."

=== Proposals in the aftermath of Kosovo's declaration of independence ===
On 17 February 2008, representatives of the people of Kosovo, without any Serb representatives, declared independence.

In 2010, US diplomats warned that European 'vacillation and weakness" could entrench Serbian control over the northern part of the territory. "Failure to act soon means losing northern Kosovo and will reopen the Pandora's box of ethnic conflict that defined the 1990s", then US ambassador, Christopher Dell, wrote that year. "The time is right to end the years of drift on the north and to alter the dynamic of a hardening partition between the north and the rest of Kosovo. ... The current situation is untenable and deteriorating. The aim is to stop the rot."

Former EU Kosovo Envoy Wolfgang Ischinger, in August 2011, stated regarding the partition of Kosovo that in his opinion "such ideas are absolutely unacceptable". He added that without a solution of the conflict, a Serbian European Union membership "will not happen, it must not happen".

In September 2011, James Ker-Lindsay, senior research fellow at the London School of Economics and Political Science, stated that the partition of Kosovo is a logical solution. In an interview for Politika, he stated that Belgrade, in the next few months, might have a chance to fight for the division of Kosovo and the establishment of large autonomy for Serbs in North Kosovo.

In May 2011, Serbian Interior Minister Ivica Dačić proposed the partition of Kosovo as a solution to the Kosovo dispute. He stated, "This is my opinion, although neither Belgrade nor Priština like it. However, I am a realistic politician and I don't see any other solution. ... I think that the only realistic solution is that places where Serbs live stay in Serbia and that the other part where the Albanians live secedes. This is the only realistic way that can lead us to a quick solution. ... Other solutions are a waste of time and years and decades would go in an attempt to solve those small issues". Former Yugoslav President Dobrica Ćosić stated, "I have been talking and writing about Kosovo and Metohija in vain for 40 years now, proposing a democratic, just, compromise and permanent partition. This is the only way to overcome centuries-long antagonism between Albanians and Serbs ... [and] stop the great Albanian expansion and create conditions for normal life of both peoples".

In October 2011, former Austrian Vice-Chancellor Erhard Busek proposed partition and stated: "I agree that the dialogue is the only path, in scope of which issues which seem to be impossible at the moment should also be discussed, such as the division of Kosovo ... I do not see why the international community would not agree on the division if Belgrade and Priština reached an agreement on the issue. All details of such resolution of the Kosovo stalemate could be agreed at some kind of 'Kosovo Dayton', with the international community as the guarantor of the accord." Macedonian president, Gjorge Ivanov, supported the continuation of the Belgrade-Pristina negotiations and said that Macedonia is against the partition of Kosovo, as that may destabilize the region.

Albanian Prime Minister Sali Berisha stated in November 2011: "Dividing Kosovo is an absurd idea and respecting the borders of Kosovo is of essential interest for all the countries in the region."

In January 2012 Montenegrin President Milo Đukanović said he did not support the idea to partition Kosovo because it could "open the door for similar solutions in other countries in the region".

On 14–15 February 2012, a referendum on accepting the institutions of the Republic of Kosovo was held in the Serb-dominated regions of north Kosovo. The result saw 99.74% of voters reject the Republic of Kosovo's institutions.

The Community of Serb Municipalities is planned to be established according to the Brussels Agreement (2013) (see section), but it has since been paused due to opposition on the Albanian side.

In October 2014, Interior Minister Ivica Dačić said that the partition would be one of the better solutions and in the interest of both Serbs and Albanians.

Steven Meyer, former Deputy Chief of the CIA's Balkan Task Force, believes that Kosovo should be divided along ethnic lines.

== Drawing the line ==
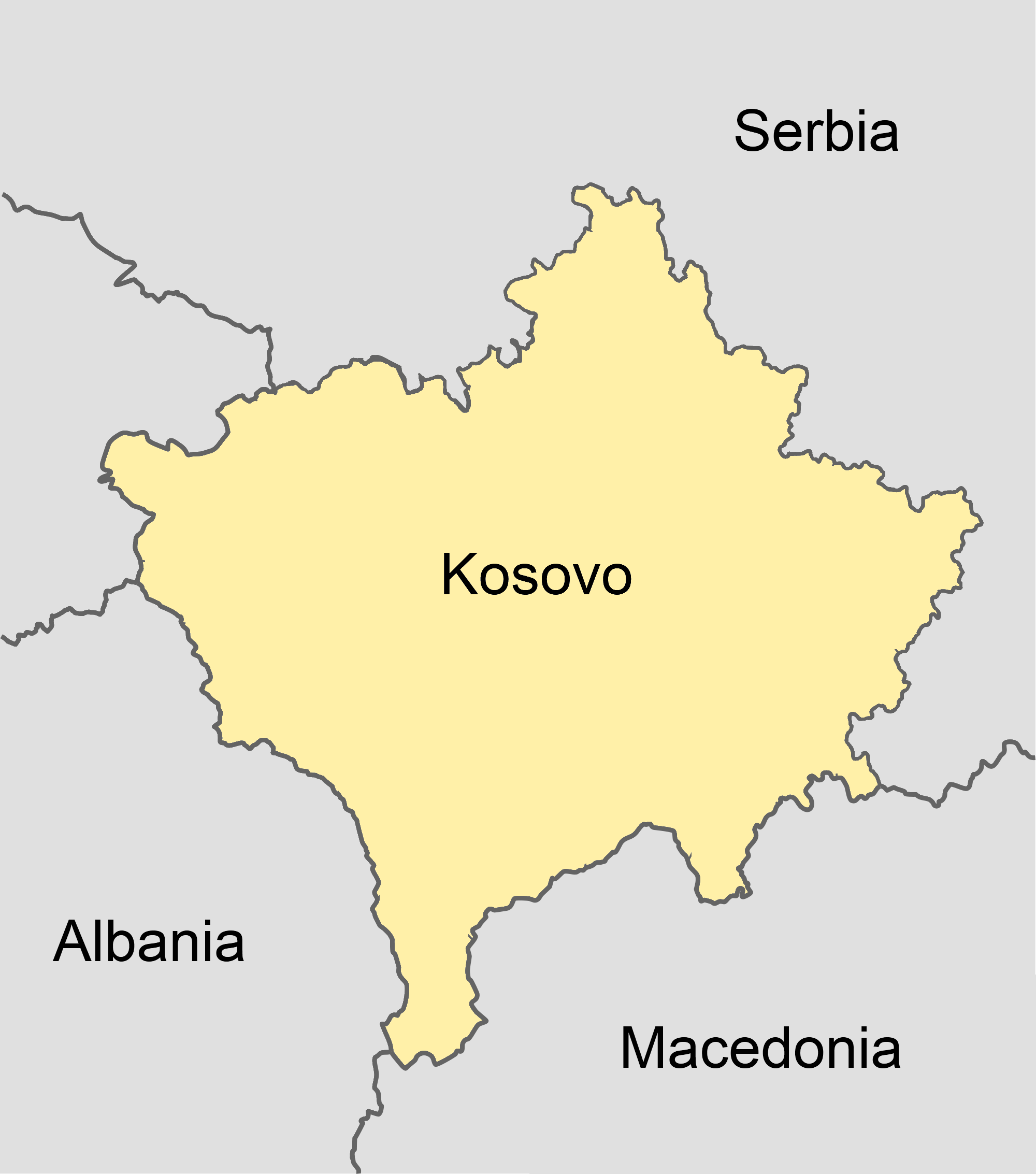
Hypothetical partition, with North Kosovo ceded to Serbia.

The partition of Kosovo along the line of the Ibar River has long been proposed. Following the 2008 independence declaration, the Serbian government formally proposed partition in a proposal to the UN, seeking Serb-majority North Kosovo to be controlled by Kosovo Serb border customs, judiciary and police services, albeit under UNMIK administration. North of the river is a predominantly ethnic Serb majority area, whereas south of the river is a predominantly ethnic Albanian area, with several Kosovo Serb enclaves.

In 2008, the Assembly of the Community of Municipalities was established, a "rival" government based in North Kosovo, loyal to Belgrade. At that time the rest of Kosovo was administrated by the UNMIK and government of the Republic of Kosovo.

Miroslav Marjanović, a top intelligence agent during the 1990s and Kosovo War, in 2016 made public classified information regarding the Kosovo War, among which were DST telegrams from 1998 about the Kosovo Liberation Army and the evaluation that France and Germany were closer to agreeing on a partition of Kosovo into a Serbian and an Albanian part, with the Albanians receiving status similar to that of Republika Srpska. Among documents were also maps depicting the potential partition.

== Community of Serb Municipalities ==
The 2013 Brussels Agreement between the governments of Kosovo and Serbia agreed to create the Community of Serb Municipalities in Kosovo. Its assembly will have no legislative authority and the judicial authorities will be integrated and operate within the Kosovo legal framework. The association was expected to be formed in 2015, but opposition riots and a petition signed by over 203,000 citizens slowed it down. The Constitutional Court of Kosovo ruled that the formation of the Association was in compliance with the constitution of Kosovo, but that certain aspects of its proposed implementation were not.

== See also ==
- Kosovo–Serbia land swap
- 2012 North Kosovo referendum
- Preševo Valley
