= Vragë =

Village in Kosovo

Vragë is a village located in Zubin Potok, Kosovo.

== Events ==
=== Water canal attack ===
On the evening of November 29, 2024, an explosive device detonated near the village of Vragë, at the Ibar-Lepenac water canal. The explosion caused severe damage to critical infrastructure that supplies water to several municipalities and supports Kosovo's main coal-fired power stations. The incident is known as the Ibar-Lepenac canal attack and it is classified as a terrorist attack by the government of Kosovo and the European Union.
