= Ibar-Lepenac canal attack =

2024 bomb attack

- Part of North Kosovo crisis
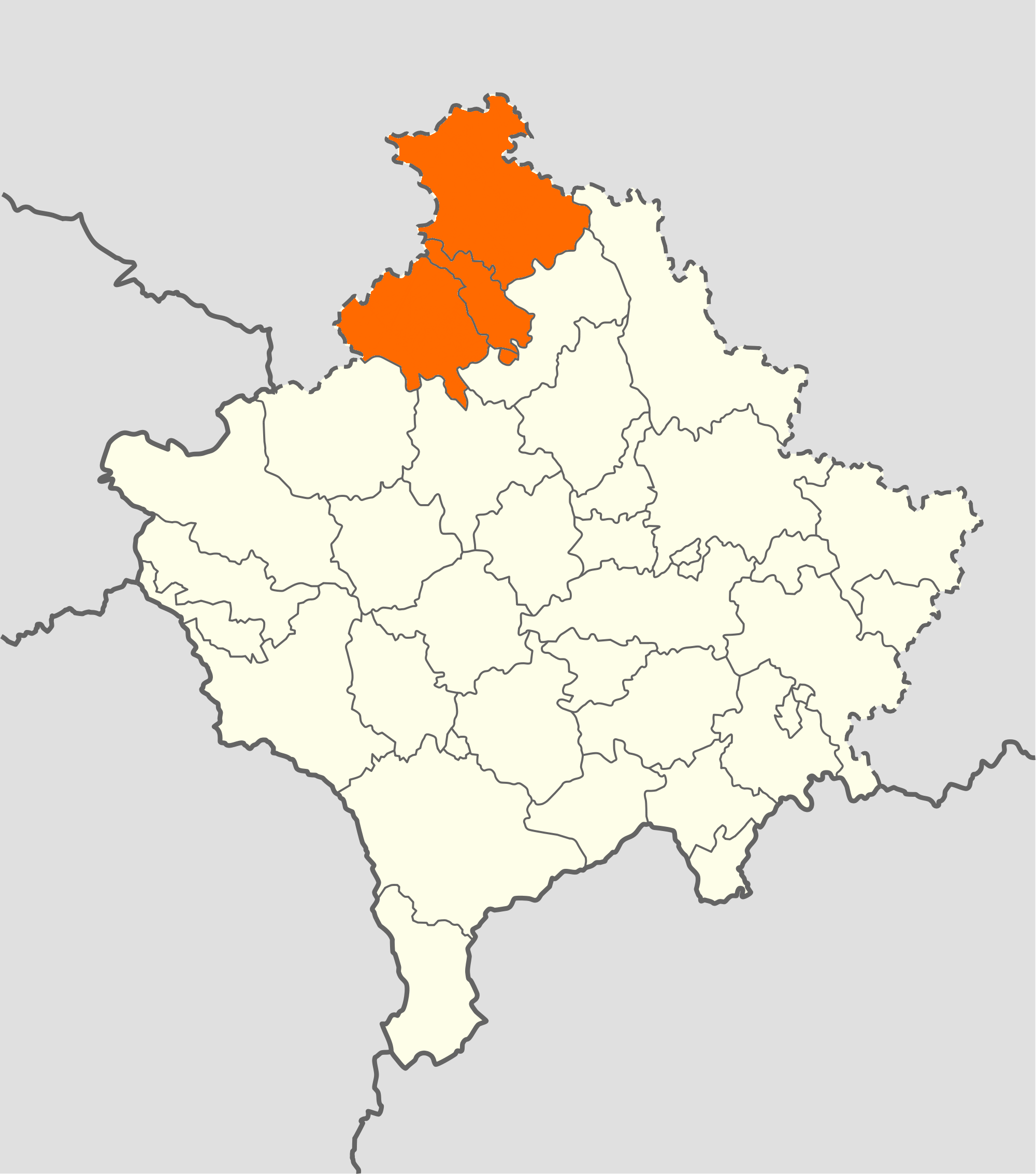
- Region of North Kosovo where the explosion occurred
- Location: Vragë, Zubin Potok, Kosovo
- Date: 29 November 2024
- Deaths: 0
- Injuries: 0
- Perpetrators: Civilna Zaštita and Serbia (Per Kosovo)

On the evening of 29 November 2024, an explosive device detonated at the Ibar-Lepenac water canal in the village of Vragë, Kosovo, severely damaging critical infrastructure that supplies water to multiple municipalities and supports the main coal-fired power station of Kosovo. The government of Kosovo attributed the attack to Serbia, framing it as part of a destabilization strategy. Both Kosovo and the European Union condemned the incident as a terrorist attack.

In the aftermath, Kosovo authorities arrested eight individuals linked to the attack, with investigations revealing the use of explosives and connections to the local Serb organization Civilna Zaštita (Civil Protection). International responses included condemnation and calls for a thorough investigation from Albania, the European Union, France, and Turkey, all expressing solidarity with Kosovo and urging accountability for those responsible.

== Incident ==
On the evening of 29 November 2024, an explosive device detonated at the Ibar-Lepenac water canal in the village of Vragë that belongs to the Zubin Potok of Kosovo, causing substantial damage to vital infrastructure that supplies water to multiple municipalities and supports the operation of the Obiliq energy plant. The explosion occurred in the village of Vrage and created a large crack in the canal. It disrupted the water supply to two coal-fired power plants that produce the majority of the country's electricity. As a result, electricity and water was also temporarily disrupted to some cities. The canal originates in Gazivoda Lake and supplies water to North Kosovo, Mitrovica, Pristina and its surroundings. That same week, there were separate attacks on a police station and a municipality building in Zvečan where hand grenades were thrown, leading Kosovo police to increase their security.

Kosovo's government quickly accused Serbia of orchestrating the attack, framing it as part of a broader strategy to destabilise the region. Prime Minister Albin Kurti claimed that the explosion was carried out by gangs linked to Serbia, while President Vjosa Osmani described the act as terrorism, blaming Serbian criminal networks. Serbia denied any involvement and Serbian President Aleksandar Vučić accused Kosovo of "hybrid" warfare against his country. Serbian foreign minister Marko Đurić condemned the attack and called for a thorough investigation, offering Serbia's assistance to repair the damaged canal.

== Aftermath ==
On 30 November, Kosovo's Minister of Internal Affairs Xhelal Sveçla announced the arrest of eight individuals in connection with the explosion. He also added that the damage was repaired. The attack was classified as a "terrorist act" by Kosovo authorities, who accused neighboring Serbia of involvement. Police Commander Gazmend Hoxha stated that the arrested individuals were suspected of inciting, organising, and executing the attack. An initial investigation revealed the use of 15 to 20 kg of explosives in the attack, and police raids on 10 locations resulted in the confiscation of military uniforms, rocket launchers, firearms, and ammunition. Most of the arrested individuals were linked to the local Serb organization Civilna Zaštita, which Kosovo had designated a "terrorist organization".

On December 4, President Osmani met with European Council President Antonio Costa and European Parliament President Roberta Metsola in Brussels where she reiterated blame on Serbia, calling for accountability for its ongoing attacks through illegal structures, and international involvement in investigating the explosion. She also stated that Kosovo's institutions rely on concrete evidence, citing arrested individuals with ties to Serbia and condemned what she described as Serbia's use of the "throw a stone and hide the hand" tactic.

== International responses ==
- Albania – President Bajram Begaj conveyed the country's support for a full investigation into the attack, underscoring the need for a "thorough investigation into this act of sabotage and terrorism". Prime Minister Edi Rama also denounced the attack, calling it a criminal act targeting critical infrastructure. He emphasised the severe impact on Kosovo's citizens and the broader normalisation process in the region. Rama urged the EU to immediately lift remaining sanctions against Kosovo and to re-engage in a new format of dialogue between Kosovo and Serbia, citing the failure of the existing dialogue framework to deliver meaningful results. Speaker of the Parliament Elisa Spiropali further stated that the perpetrators, instigators, and those responsible for such acts should face appropriate punishment.
- European Union – The European Union strongly condemned what it referred to as a terrorist attack and a "despicable act of sabotage" against critical infrastructure vital for Kosovo's water supply and energy system. The union expressed solidarity with Kosovo and offered support to local authorities, coordinating efforts with KFOR and EULEX to assist in the investigation, as well as calling for full cooperation with Kosovo authorities to bring the perpetrators to justice. Additionally, the European Parliament issued a joint statement condemning the attack, reaffirming support for Kosovo's institutions, and emphasising the need for a thorough investigation to hold those responsible accountable. Member of Parliament Thomas Waitz called for an international investigation into the incident, emphasised the need for Serbia to take responsibility and act against extremists. He further urged the five EU member states that had not recognised Kosovo to do so promptly in order to send a clear message against destabilisation.
- France – The French government denounced the attack and expressed solidarity with Kosovo, calling for a thorough investigation. It also acknowledged the effective coordination between KFOR and EULEX in responding to the incident.
- Germany – Chairman of the Foreign Affairs Committee of the Bundestag Michael Roth condemned the attack as a "terrorist act", stating that the methods employed mirrored those typically associated with Russian terrorism. Roth called for a thorough investigation, warning that if Serbia were implicated it would mark the end of EU accession negotiations with Serbia.
- Turkey – The Turkish government strongly condemned attack and affirmed its commitment to supporting Kosovo and called for a swift identification and prosecution of those responsible.
- United States – U.S. ambassador to Kosovo Jeff Hovenier stated that the United States did not know who was behind the attack but added that once it would be determined, "we will work with the proper authorities to ensure that they are held accountable.

== See also ==
- North Kosovo crisis (2022–2026)
- List of terrorist incidents in 2024
