= Kosovo–Serbia land swap =

Proposed land exchange between Kosovo and Serbia

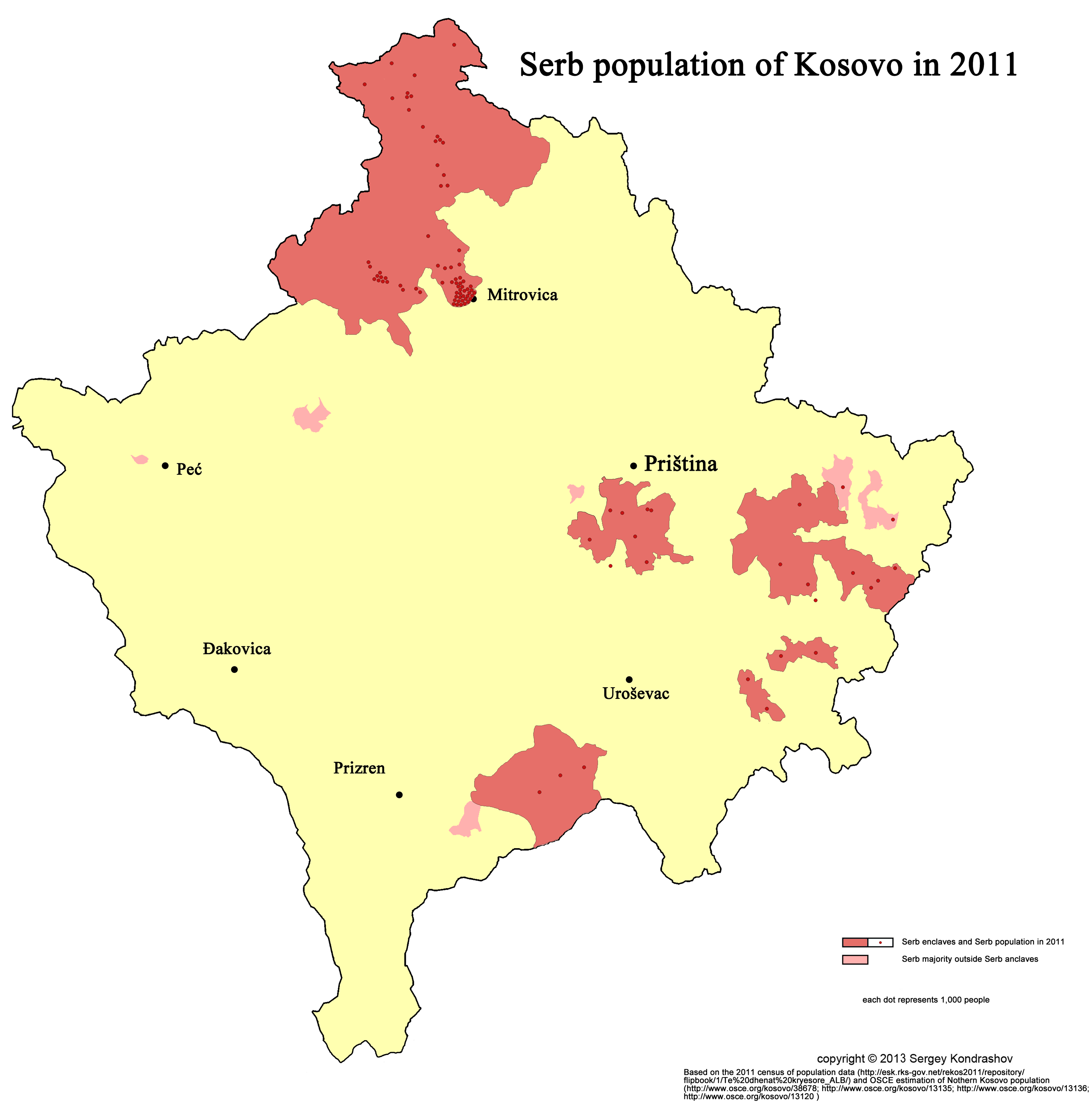
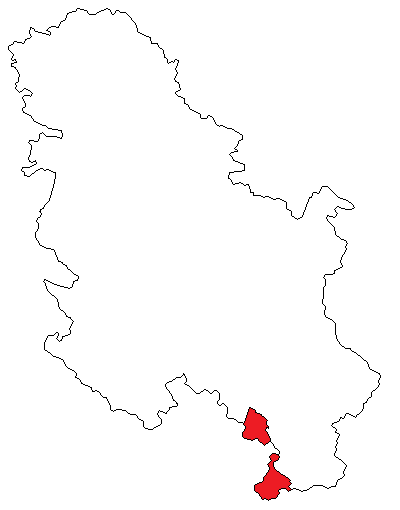
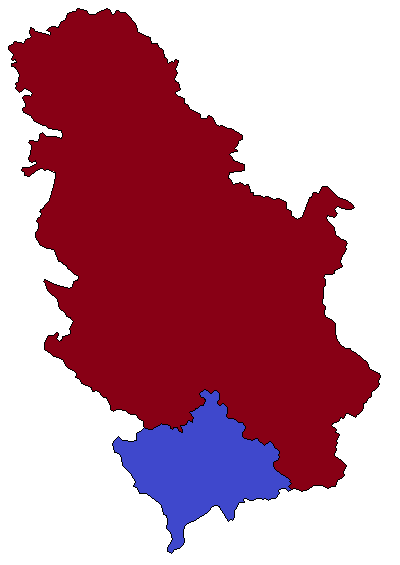
Top: Map showing the distribution of Kosovo Serbs in Kosovo. The northernmost region is North Kosovo.
Middle: Map showing the regions in Serbia where Serbian Albanians live. The southernmost region is the Preševo Valley, of an ethnic Albanian majority, and the northernmost region is the municipality of Medveđa, where Albanians are a minority.
Bottom: Map showing what the borders of Kosovo and Serbia would look like after a hypothetical land swap in which Serbia would get North Kosovo and Kosovo would get the Preševo Valley.

A land exchange has been proposed between Serbia and the partially recognized state of Kosovo to make their border run along ethnic lines. Initially rejected by the international community, the little progress made by the European Union-backed Belgrade–Pristina Dialogue has brought the idea into greater consideration in the EU and also in the United States. The territorial exchange is generally discussed to involve a transfer of the Preševo Valley of Serbia with an ethnic Albanian majority to Kosovo and the pass of the majority ethnic Serb region of North Kosovo of Kosovo to Serbia. The cession of the Serbian municipality of Medveđa to Kosovo has also been proposed. This municipality, although with a considerable Albanian minority, is predominantly ethnic Serbian.

A territorial exchange between Kosovo and Serbia has been proposed to potentially solve the current political status in the region that has stayed stagnant ever since Kosovo's independence declaration in 2008 in order to facilitate the accession of Kosovo and Serbia into the EU. This could also lead to a complete normalization of the relations between Kosovo and Serbia and a potential accession of Kosovo into the United Nations (UN).

In 2018, the president of Kosovo Hashim Thaçi and the president of Serbia Aleksandar Vučić announced their willingness to consider a territorial exchange between both countries. The then European Commissioner for Neighbourhood and Enlargement, Johannes Hahn, said "saying nothing should be excluded at this stage" but urged both leaders to "ensure any deal does not destabilize the wider region". However, in 2020, the then Prime Minister of Kosovo Albin Kurti rejected this idea, stating as justification to this that the Kosovars had already "suffered enough". In general, the Kosovar leadership has been more unwelcoming to the proposal than the Serbian one.

Some experts have argued that a land swap between Kosovo and Serbia would not solve any of the real problems of the conflict and that it could resume ethnic and territorial conflicts within and outside the Balkans. Furthermore, the proposal faces opposition from Serbian and Kosovar Albanian nationalists, with Ramush Haradinaj, former leader of the Kosovo Liberation Army (KLA) and former Prime Minister of Kosovo, saying that such an idea "would lead to war". Additionally, Kosovo Serbs outside North Kosovo have expressed concern about being "abandoned" after a territorial exchange.

Some countries have expressed support or rather a lack of opposition to the idea in the case it was fulfilled in the form of a bilateral agreement. Such countries are Austria, Belgium, Hungary, Romania and the United States. Other countries have taken tough stances against the idea, these being Finland, France, Germany, Luxembourg and the United Kingdom, as well as many of Kosovo's and Serbia's neighbours such as Bosnia and Herzegovina, Croatia, Montenegro and North Macedonia.

== See also ==
- Partition of Kosovo
- Partition of Bosnia and Herzegovina
- Proposed secession of Republika Srpska
- Ilirida
- Political status of Kosovo
