= Bërnjak =

Bërnjak Брњак Brnjak
- Village
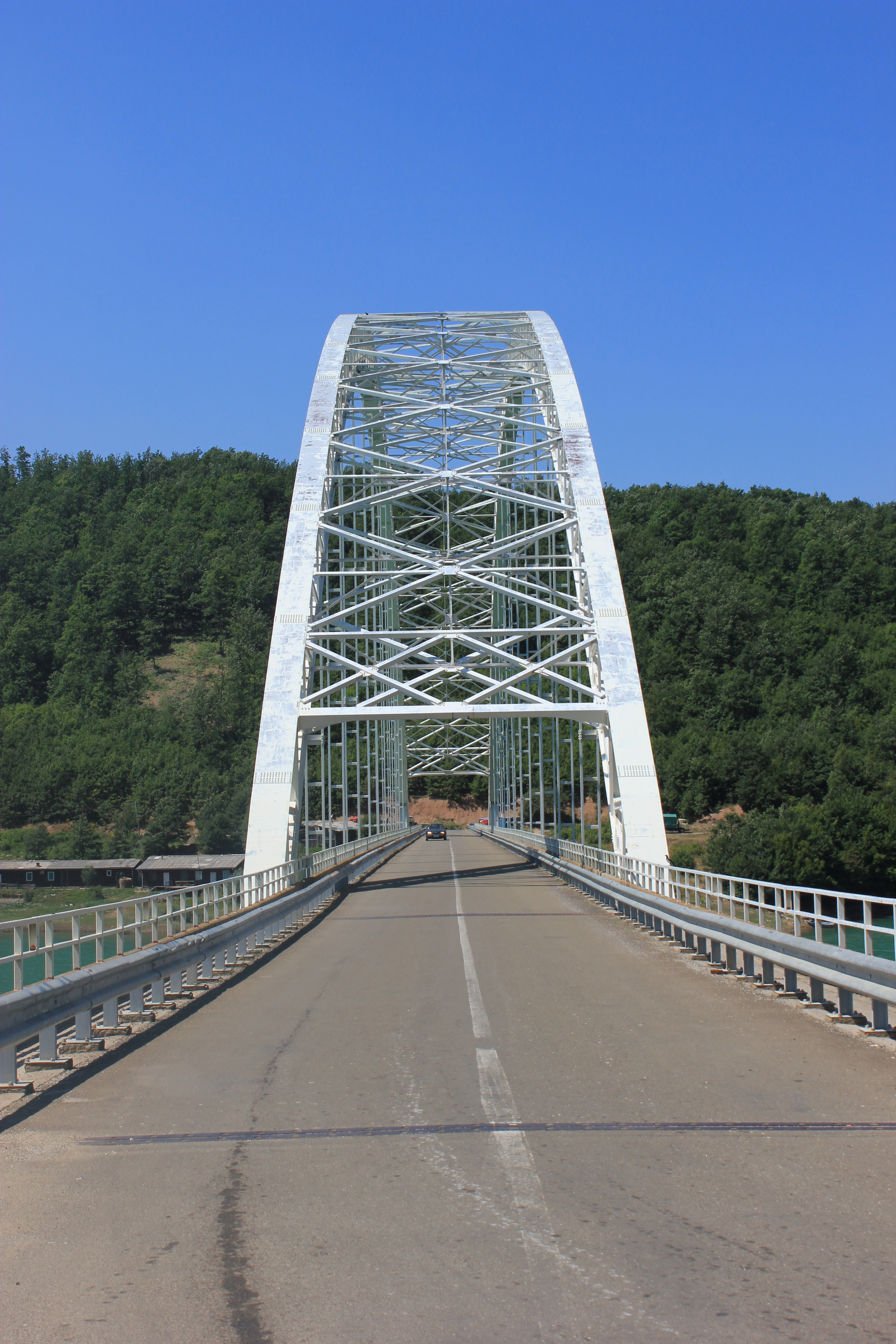
- Nicknames: Brnjaci, Brnjake
- Interactive map of Bërnjak
- Location within Kosovo
- Coordinates: 42°56′03″N 20°34′16″E
- Country: Kosovo
- District: Mitrovica
- Municipality: Zubin Potok

Area
  - Total: 29.81 km^{2} (11.51 sq mi)
- Elevation: 1,220 m (4,000 ft)

Population (1991)
  - Total: 207
  - Density: 6.94/km^{2} (18.0/sq mi)
- Time zone: UTC+1 (CET)
  - Summer (DST): UTC+2 (CEST)

Bërnjak (Albanian: Bërjak (Note: Before 1999)) or Brnjak (nicknamed by local residents Brnjaci or Brnjake) is a village in northern Kosovo. A border crossing with Serbia is located in the village.

== Geography ==
The settlement is located on the territory of the cadastral municipality of Bërnjak with an area of 2,981 ha. Once one of the largest villages in North Kosovo, it is located in the Brnjačka river basin, which flows from the slopes of Mokra Gora.

== History ==
During World War II, Bërnjak was among the villages in North Kosovo that was burned down by Albanian paramilitaries working with the Sandžak Muslim militia and the Serb population expelled.

== 2008 North Kosovo incident ==
Bërnjak was the location of one of the NATO-staffed border checkpoints between Serbia and Kosovo. In February 2008, the border was sealed by NATO troops after ethnic Serbs ransacked and set fire to the border checkpoints at Jarinje and Bërnjak.

== See also ==
- Ujman Lake
