= Çabër =

Çabër: Çabër (Albanian); Čabra (Serbian)
- Village
- Interactive map of Çabër
- Location within Kosovo
- Country: Kosovo
- District: District of Mitrovica
- Municipality: Zubin Potok

Population
  - Estimate (2018): 1,300
- Time zone: UTC+1 (CET)
  - Summer (DST): UTC+2 (CEST)

Çabër or Čabra is a village located in the municipality of Zubin Potok, in Kosovo. Çabër has approximately 1,300 inhabitants who are all Albanians. The river Ibar runs through the village.

== History ==
According to legend, there were two brothers and their nephew who came to Çabër first and gave it its name. Eventually a village was formed and grew to have a large population. The brothers and their nephew allegedly lived in the village since prehistoric times. The most common surnames in the village are Uka, Kurti, Mehmeti, Ferizi.

On 29th March 1999, Serbian artillery fired shells from the village Zupç destroying the whole village. After the war funds were raised to rebuild Çabër and the local Albanian population started returning to their village.

== Notable people ==
- Izmir Zeqiri, current mayor of Zubin Potok
