= Podruga =

Podruga or podrugi with the meaning of second in order is a term used to describe "a wife in a second marriage". Until the end of the twentieth century, this word referred to a second wife whom a husband brought into the house, in the case when he had no children with his first wife. This second wife gave birth to children, and they all lived together under the same roof, but unlike the customs in the Muslim world, the first wife practically became a member of the family.

Podruga is a custom passed down from the Balkans, mostly with Albanian and Serbian people, and when it comes to the first wife, it was not about sacrifice, but about the great love she expressed for her husband. Each wife had separate rooms, chores, and concerns, but they were always together. In some areas of Kosovo and Metohija, this custom was established and was permitted by customary law, even with the tacit or explicit consent of the first infertile wife, who, for economic reasons, had nowhere to go.

"That woman has not renounced love, if she renounced her husband. The host marries a second time, and the second wife (the second wife) comes to bear children, which the first wife cannot have. The first wife remains in the house, but no longer in the capacity of a wife; there is no intimacy with her, the marriage is dissolved in the church, but the first wife is socially protected in the house, she is there as an assistant."

— Nataša Terzić,

Below is a more detailed explanation:

"Cohabitation as a phenomenon does not exist in the Christian world, and it is a wonderful story about the coexistence of two women who are directed towards the same goal, to raise offspring. It does not matter that one gave birth and the other could not. Cohabitation was present in Kosovo and Metohija until the 1980s. It was normal for them to remarry, and this was most often at the insistence of the first wife."

— Nataša Terzić,

Although podruga was not legalized as an official custom in the Christian world, it nevertheless existed:

"The practice was first described in the Bible, where Sarah brought Hagar to Abraham because she thought she would not have children, but in the 90th year, according to God's promise, she gave birth to Isaac. This custom has existed since time immemorial, but in some cultures it was more widespread, and in others less. In Kosovo and Metohija it lasted until the 1980s."

— Nataša Terzić,

The last known podruga, from Serbia, is Petkana Filipović from the village of Drena. in Kosovo and Metohija, who gave her husband Vujica and his first wife Roksanda four daughters and a son.

== See more ==
- Balkan sworn virgins
