= Zupče =

Zupče: Zupçi (Albanian); Зупче/Zupče (Serbian)
- Village
- Location within Kosovo
- Coordinates: 42°54′N 20°46′E
- Location: Kosovo
- District: Mitrovicë
- Municipality: Zubin Potok
- Time zone: UTC+1 (CET)
  - Summer (DST): UTC+2 (CEST)

Zupče (Serbian Cyrillic: Зупче, Albanian: Zupçi) is a small village located in Zubin Potok in northern Kosovo.

== History ==
During World War II, Zupče was among the villages in North Kosovo that was burned down by Albanian paramilitaries and the Serb population expelled.
