= Jagnjenica, Kosovo =

Jagnjenica
- Village
- Interactive map of Jagnjenica
- Country: Kosovo
- District: Mitrovicë
- Municipality: Zubin Potok
- Time zone: UTC+1 (CET)
  - Summer (DST): UTC+2 (CEST)

Jagnjenica is a village in Zubin Potok, Kosovo.

== History ==
During World War II, Jagnjenica was among the villages in North Kosovo that was burned down by Albanian paramilitaries and the Serb population expelled.
