= Land exchange =

A land exchange or land swap is the voluntary exchange of land between two parties, typically a private owner and a government. These parties may include farmers, estate owners, developers, nature organizations, and governments. Land swaps may also take place between two sovereign nations for practical, geographical, or economic reasons.

The exchange of land is undertaken for a variety of reasons, among them the conversion or rehabilitation of a parcel of land to nature or to further the aims of real estate developers. Exchanges frequently present substantial challenges and risks to conservation efforts, particularly in safeguarding historic landscapes, as well as raising public access concerns for land that transitions from public to private ownership.

After the Netherlands designated the Dutch National Ecological Network, provincial governments in the country established programs offering financial and organizational assistance for the acquisition of agricultural land and its restoration to more natural habitats.

== Examples ==
=== Bangladesh and India ===
- India–Bangladesh enclaves

=== Jordan ===
- Jordan transfer desert lands to Saudi Arabia in exchange to land south of Aqaba in 1965 so Jordan can extend its only sea access.

=== Kosovo and Serbia ===
- Proposed land swap Kosovo–Serbia land swap

=== United Kingdom ===
- The township of Boycott (in the parish of Stowe), transferred to Buckinghamshire.
- The parish of Swineshead was an exclave of the county surrounded by Bedfordshire, 1278 acres (517 ha). In 1896, the parish was transferred to Bedfordshire in exchange for the parish of Tilbrook.

=== United States ===
- United States–Mexico Rio Grande Border Finalization
- Anglo-American Convention of 1818
