= Babiće, Zubin Potok =

Babiq: Babiq (Albanian); Babiće (Serbian)
- Village
- Interactive map of Babiq
- Location within Kosovo
- Coordinates: 42°57′47″N 20°31′2″E
- Country: Kosovo
- District: Mitrovicë
- Municipality: Zubin Potok

Population (2009)
  - Total: 4
- Time zone: UTC+1 (CET)
  - Summer (DST): UTC+2 (CEST)

Babiće (Albanian: Babiq) is a village located in the municipality of Zubin Potok, in Kosovo. According to 2009 estimates for the 2011 Kosovan census, it has 4 inhabitants, of whom the majority are Serbs.
