= Dren, Zubin Potok =

Dren
- Village
- Interactive map of Dren
- Location within Kosovo
- Coordinates: 42°51′20″N 20°38′42″E
- Country: Kosovo
- District: Mitrovicë
- Municipality: Zubin Potok

Population (2009)
  - Total: 16

Dren is a village located in the municipality of Zubin Potok, in Kosovo. According to 2009 estimates for the 2011 Kosovan census, it has 16 inhabitants, of whom the majority are Serbs.

== History ==
During World War II, Dren was among the villages in North Kosovo that was burned down by Albanian paramilitaries and the Serb population expelled.
