= Steven P. Meyer =

American judge and politician

Judge of the Tippecanoe Superior Court 2
- Incumbent
- Assumed office January 1, 2015

President of the Lafayette City Council

Personal details
- Born: 1959 (age 66–67)
- Party: Democratic
- Spouse: Kimberly Meyer
- Education: St. Joseph's College (BA); Indiana University School of Law–Indianapolis (JD)
- Occupation: Judge, attorney

Steven P. Meyer (born 1959) is an American jurist and politician serving as a judge of the Tippecanoe Superior Court 2 in Lafayette, Indiana. First elected to the bench in 2014, he previously served for 23 years on the Lafayette City Council, including a tenure as council president. Meyer gained national attention in January 2026 when he and his wife were injured after being shot during a targeted attack at their home.

== Early life and education ==
Meyer graduated from Central Catholic High School in 1977. He attended St. Joseph's College in Rensselaer, where he was valedictorian of the class of 1981 and served as an intern for U.S. representative Floyd Fithian. He earned his Juris Doctor from the Indiana University Robert H. McKinney School of Law in 1984.

== Career ==
Prior to his judicial career, Meyer practiced law in the Lafayette area for 30 years, including time as a managing partner at the law firm Ball Eggleston, PC. He also served as a public defender in Tippecanoe County for 14 years.

Meyer was a member of the Lafayette City Council for 23 years and served as the body's president. In 2014, he ran for the Tippecanoe Superior Court 2 as a Democrat and was elected on November 4, 2014. In December 2025, Meyer announced he would not seek a third term and intended to retire at the end of 2026, marking 35 years of public service.

=== Notable cases ===
Meyer presided over the high-profile case of Natalia Grace, a Ukrainian-born girl whose adoptive American parents were charged with neglect after abandoning her. The case received international media coverage due to disputes over Barnett's actual age. In July 2024, Meyer sentenced a man to 40 years in prison following a fatal accidental shooting involving two young children in Lafayette.

== 2026 shooting ==
On January 18, 2026, at approximately 2:15 p.m., Meyer and his wife Kimberly were shot at their residence on Mill Pond Lane in Lafayette. According to police reports, an unidentified individual in a disguise knocked on the door and claimed to have found the couple's dog, before firing shots through the front door.

Meyer suffered a gunshot wound to the arm, while Kimberly Meyer was struck in the hip. Both were transported to a hospital and listed in stable condition. The shooting triggered a multi-agency investigation involving the Federal Bureau of Investigation (FBI), Indiana State Police, and local law enforcement. Following the attack, Indiana Supreme Court Chief Justice Loretta Rush issued a statewide alert advising all judges to remain vigilant regarding their personal security. Five people were arrested on charges including attempted murder, conspiracy to commit murder, bribery and obstruction of justice.
