= Gazivoda Lake =

Lake in Kosovo and Serbia

- Ujman Lake
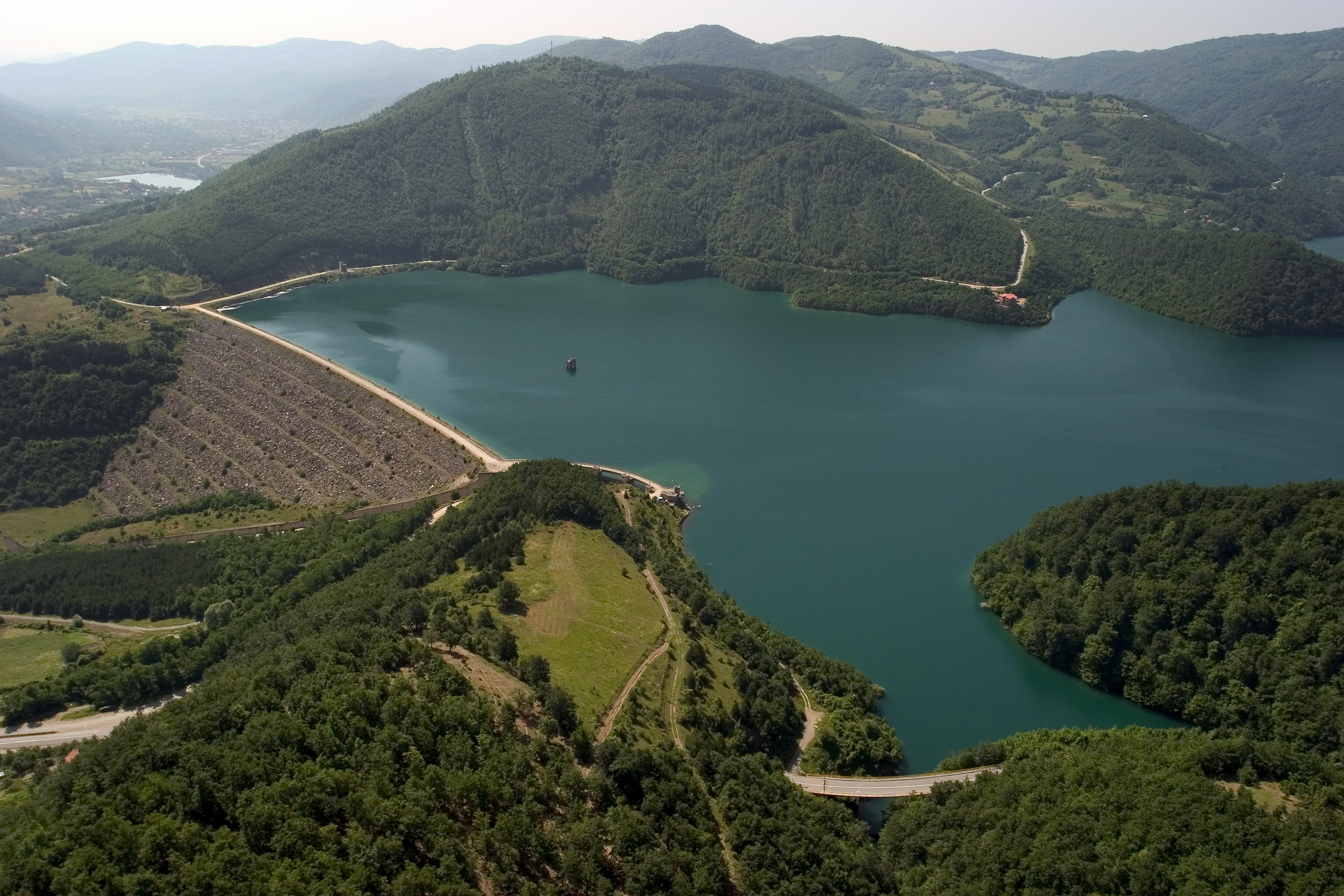
- Gazivoda Lake
- Interactive map of Gazivoda Lake
- Location: Kosovo, Serbia
- Coordinates: 42°57′42″N 20°34′1″E
- Primary inflows: Ibar River
- Basin countries: Kosovo, Serbia
- Max. length: 16.5 km (10.3 mi)
- Max. width: 1.10 km (0.68 mi)
- Surface area: 11.9 km^{2} (4.6 sq mi)
- Average depth: 105 m (344 ft)
- Surface elevation: 694 m (2,277 ft)

Gazivoda Lake (Serbian: Језеро Газиводе) or Ujman Lake (Albanian: Liqeni i Ujmanit), is an artificial lake in Kosovo and Serbia. Gazivoda Lake has an area of 11.9 km^{2} (4.6 sq mi) of which 9.2 km^{2} (3.6 sq mi) reside in North Kosovo and 2.7 km^{2} (1.0 sq mi) in Serbia. The lake was formed by the damming of the Ibar River.

== History ==
As a project, the damming of the Ibar for the creation of a reservoir and thus the generation of hydroelectricity existed since the 1960s to cover for the energy needs of the population and the economy of Socialist Autonomous Province of Kosovo which were expanding at the time. Gazivoda was created between 1973 and 1978. Some sources claim that 230 or up to 1000 people that lived in area were relocated. The project was undertaken by Energoprojekt, the state company of Yugoslavia for the development of hydropower. The main contractor was Belgrade-based company "Hidrotehnika".

The construction of Gazivoda cost $90 million. Half of it was financed by the fund for infrastructure development of Yugoslavia, a fund which was paid for by taxation in all federal republics and autonomous regions. The other 50% was financed by loans from the World Bank. The dissolution of Yugoslavia in the 1990s and the independence of Kosovo in 2008 has resulted in a dispute between the Republic of Serbia and Kosovo about the ownership of Gazivoda. Serbian sources maintain that Serbia should be recognized as the legal owner of the project, as most loan obligations were transferred to Serbia in the post-Yugoslav era. Kosovan sources maintain that the legal entity responsible for the loans by the World Bank was the Socialist Autonomous Province of Kosovo, while Serbia as a legal entity was not involved in the financing of the project. Kosovo further asserts that indemnities to the people that were relocated both in the Autonomous Province and Kosovo and Serbia were paid solely by the institutions of Province of Kosovo.

== Archeological findings ==
In the area of the Ibar basin, a Roman necropolis and the medieval court of Helen of Anjou, Queen of Serbia was located in Brnjak, near Zubin Potok, where she founded a vocational course for poor girls that locals have called "the first school for women in the Balkans". In the lake, tombstones, possible medieval artifacts, Serbian Orthodox churches, and 19th-century houses have been found. Whether they are related to ancient or medieval periods remains unclear. A team of Russian archaeologists has undertaken the project of mapping archaeological findings in the lake and investigating any possible links to antiquity.
