= Preševo Valley =

Geopolitical region in Serbia

Coordinates: 42°18′N 21°38′E

Preševo Valley Прешевска долина (Serbian) Lugina e Preshevës (Albanian)
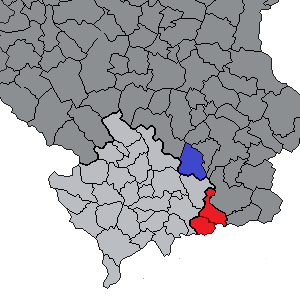
- Preševo Valley (municipalities of Preševo and Bujanovac are marked in red while Medveđa is marked in blue)
- Interactive map of Preševo Valley
- Country: Serbia
- District: Pčinja
- Largest city: Preševo

Area
  - Total: 1,249 km^{2} (482 sq mi)

Population
  - Total: 80,877
  - Density: 64.75/km^{2} (167.7/sq mi)

The Preševo Valley (Serbian: Прешевска долина, romanized: Preševska dolina; Albanian: Lugina e Preshevës) is a geopolitical region in southern Serbia, along the border with the disputed territory of Kosovo. The valley geographically includes municipalities of Bujanovac and Preševo, and politically also Medveđa. It is home to most of the Albanian community in Serbia, who comprise most of the population with the rest being Serbs and Romani.

== Etymology ==
In Albanian the area is referred to as Lugina e Preshevës and in Serbian as Preševska dolina. Albanians also sometimes call the region eastern Kosovo as parts of the territory were considered part of geographical region of Kosovo until the end of World War II. Preševo itself was a kaza of the Kosovo Vilayet until 1912. Medveđa was part of the sanjak of Niš until 1878. The change in the administrative border between In a series of administrative reforms after the war, it became part of Pčinja District. Because of Albanian demands for territorial autonomy, the use of "Preševo Valley" is somewhat politically loaded. In Serbian official statements, the area is usually referred to as the "territory of municipalities of Preševo, Bujanovac, and Medveđa".

== History ==
In 1938, during the colonisation of Kosovo, Preševo was designated in the Turkish-Yugoslav Convention as one of the areas whose population would be forced to migrate to Turkey.

=== 1990s ===
On March 1 and 2, 1992, a referendum was held in the Preševo Valley as a plebiscite to form autonomy with the right to join the self-declared protostate Republic of Kosova. 97% of the 45,000 registered answered in favor. The Yugoslav government deemed the referendum unconstitutional. The region then established defacto political autonomy, and the Assembly for Territorial-Political Autonomy of the Albanians of the region, but with no real dejure success.

The Yugoslav communist government, seeking to maintain Serbian control over the road and rail routes that passed through the region and also control Albanian nationalists, separated this region from Kosovo and organized it into Serbia. During the Kosovo War 6,000–8,000 ethnic Albanians left the area. They reported that they were being conscripted, and Serbian paramilitaries were trying to force them into military barracks.

=== 2001 conflict ===
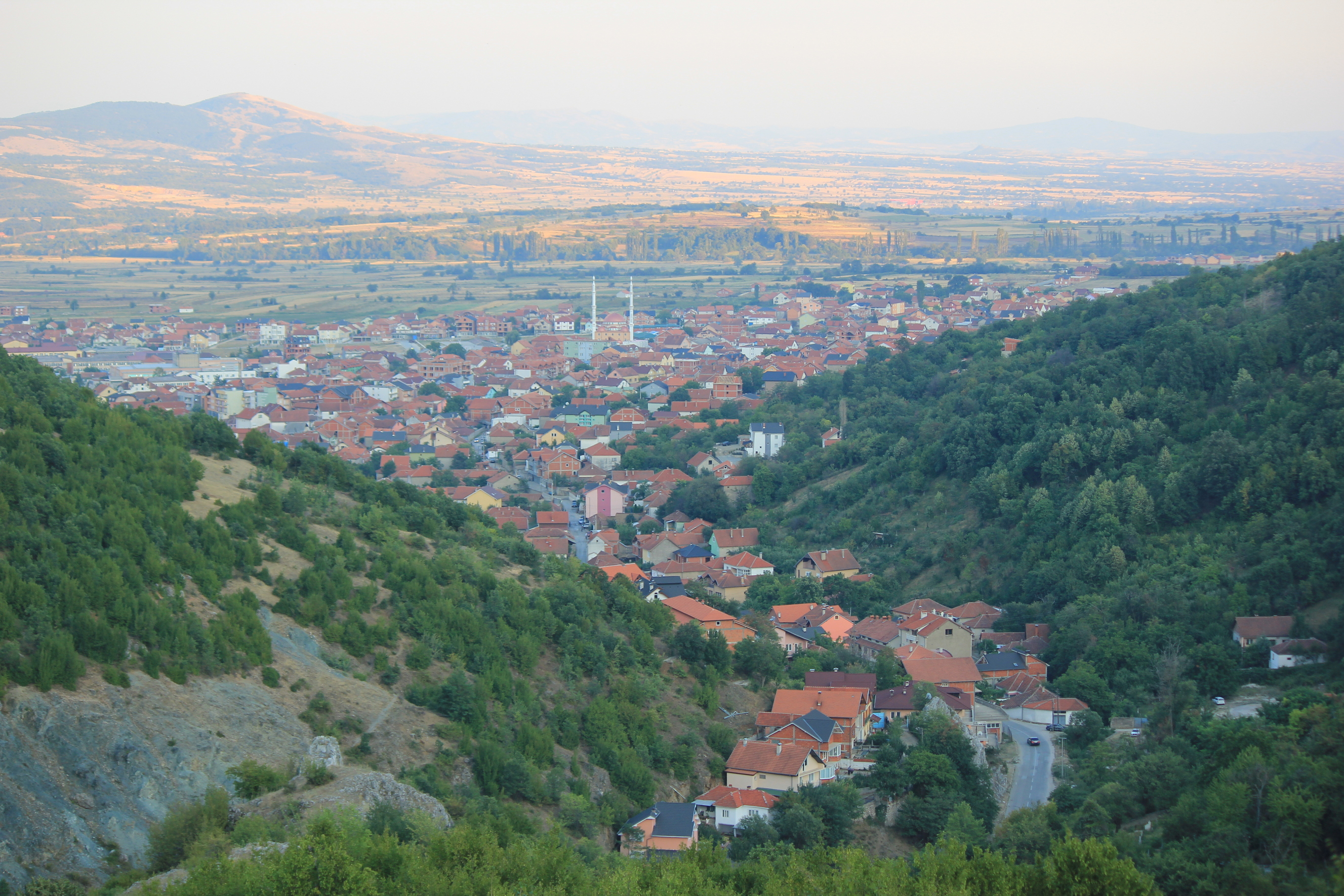
Panoramic view of town of Preševo

In 2001, as a follow-up to the Kosovo War, there were clashes between Serbian security forces and ethnic Albanian guerrillas linked to the Kosovo Liberation Army (KLA), known as the Liberation Army of Preševo, Medveđa and Bujanovac (Albanian: Ushtria Çlirimtare për Preshevë, Medvegjë dhe Bujanoc, UÇPMB). The aim of UÇPMB was to take full control of Preševo, Bujanovac and Medveđa and hold them until such time as the adjacent lands, Kosovo and western Macedonia, also came under Albanian control. This should have been followed by the gradual opening of the borders. Lacking the attention of the international media, the incidents paused as the activities spread south of the border into Macedonia from where the twin organization National Liberation Army, engaged in a war against Macedonian authorities. The Preševo valley conflict ended after international intervention that led to peace treaty, which demilitarised the area, amnestied UÇPMB and granted to the Yugoslav army entry to the region under NATO's approval.

=== Recent period ===
In 2007, Boris Tadić, the president of Serbia, stated "that former and current terrorists, who recently managed to escape from prison in Kosovo, were located in northern regions of the Republic of Macedonia". According to Tadić, "terrorists are planning new attacks on municipalities in southern Serbia in order to start a new Preševo Valley conflict".

In 2021, the Helsinki Committee for Human Rights in Serbia reported that the Serbian government was undertaking a "passivation of residence of Albanians" resulting in Albanians living in Southern Serbia losing the right to vote, their property, health insurance, pension and employment. This measure amounted to "ethnic cleansing through administrative means".

In 2025, Kosovo Prime Minister Albin Kurti issued a letter to the High Representative of Foreign affairs and Security Policy of the European Commission, Kaja Kallas, accusing the Government of Serbia of "systematic discrimination" against Albanians in the Preševo Valley in the political, economic, administrative and cultural spheres.

== Geography ==
Geographically, the Preševo Valley is coterminous with the river basin of Preševska Moravica from its source near the town of Preševo to the confluence with South Morava at Bujanovac. It is part of the Morava/Vardar North–south route across the Balkans, which follows the flows of Great Morava and South Morava through Serbia. This route carries the pan-European corridor X and E75.

== Politics ==
There are six parties which represent the Albanian minority in local and national politics. The Party for Democratic Action, one of the bigger organizations, won two seats in the 2014 parliamentary election. Other parties boycotted the elections, citing deep discontent over Belgrade's treatment of the Albanian minority as one of the main reasons. As a result, the National Assembly of Serbia has only two ethnic Albanians.

The region is often mentioned in connection with political negotiations of the Kosovo status process. Albanian leaders from the Preševo Valley wanted to participate in the talks but were not allowed. A territorial exchange between Serbia and Kosovo involving the Preševo Valley (and sometimes Medveđa) and North Kosovo is an often-mentioned topic in media and informal "probe" statements, but all sides in the official process so far rejected any prospect of a border change. A Chinese scholar proposed another territory exchange: the Serb enclaves south of the Ibar River with Preševo Valley.

== Demographics ==
According to the 2022 census, in the municipalities of Bujanovac, Preševo, and Medveđa, 80,877 inhabitants were registered. Albanians were the most numerous with 57,710 (71% of total population), Serbs accounted for 17,001 or 21%, and Roma were at 3,900 or 4.8%.

Municipality	Ethnicity						Total
Municipality	Albanians	%	Serbs	%	Roma	%	Total
Bujanovac	25,465	62%	10,467	25.5%	3,532	8.6%	41,068
Preševo	31,340	93.7%	1,607	4.8%	219	0.6%	33,449
Medveđa	905	14.2%	4,927	77.5%	149	2.3%	6,360
Preševo Valley	57,710	71%	17,001	21%	3,900	4.8%	80,877

== See also ==
- Albanians in Serbia
