= Steven E. Meyer =

American intelligence official and academic

- Education: University of Wisconsin (BS); Fordham University (MS); Georgetown University (PhD)
- Occupations: Intelligence officer, political scientist
- Employer(s): Central Intelligence Agency; National Defense University
- Known for: Analysis of the Yugoslav Wars; Deputy Chief of the CIA Balkan Task Force

Steven E. Meyer (born circa 1941) is an American former intelligence official and academic. He served for 25 years in the Central Intelligence Agency, most notably as the deputy chief of the agency's Interagency Balkan Task Force during the Yugoslav Wars of the 1990s. He is known for his involvement in the intelligence support for the Dayton Accords and his subsequent academic work at the National Defense University, where he became a critic of the United States foreign policy in Southeast Europe.

== Education ==
Meyer graduated from the Eastern Christian High School in 1959, received a Bachelor of Science from the University of Wisconsin, followed by a Master of Science from Fordham University. He earned his PhD in political science from Georgetown University, where he specialized in comparative politics and passed his comprehensive examinations with distinction.

== Career ==
After receiving his PhD, Meyer taught at Georgetown University for a period before moving into the private sector at the think tank Mathematica Inc. in 1974. From 1982 to 1983 he served as an American Political Science Association Congressional Fellow.

=== Intelligence service ===
Meyer's career in the CIA spanned from 1986 to 2011. He specialized in European and Russian politics, including work on nuclear weapons proliferation, arms control enforcement, and psychological profiling of political leaders. He provided intelligence support for the Intermediate-Range Nuclear Forces Treaty and conventional arms control talks in Vienna and Geneva.

During the Bosnian War and the subsequent conflicts in the Balkans, he served as the deputy chief of the CIA's Balkan Task Force for five years. In this capacity, he provided political and military analysis to the Clinton administration and was involved in the intelligence briefing process surrounding the Dayton Agreement.

=== Academia and later work ===
After retiring from the CIA, Meyer joined the faculty of the National Defense University in Washington, D.C., where he was a professor of political science and national security studies for 13 years. He later served as the dean of graduate studies and the chair of the National Security Program at the now-defunct Daniel Morgan Graduate School.

== Policy views ==
Meyer is a frequent commentator on Balkan affairs, often espousing a realist perspective that diverges from official U.S. and NATO positions.

=== On Balkan policy ===
Meyer has criticized U.S. engagement in the Balkans as "imperial," arguing that Washington's focus on NATO credibility often took precedence over realities. He has suggested that the borders established after the breakup of Yugoslavia are not "sacrosanct" and has advocated for solutions that reflect ethnic demographics, including potential territorial exchanges in Kosovo.

=== On NATO ===
In 2002, Meyer published a controversial article titled "The Carcass of Dead Policies: The Irrelevance of NATO" in the journal Parameters, arguing that the alliance had lost its primary purpose following the end of the Cold War.
