= Zubin Potok =

Zubin Potok: Zubin Potoku (Albanian) Zubin Potok or Зубин Поток (Serbian)
- Town and municipality
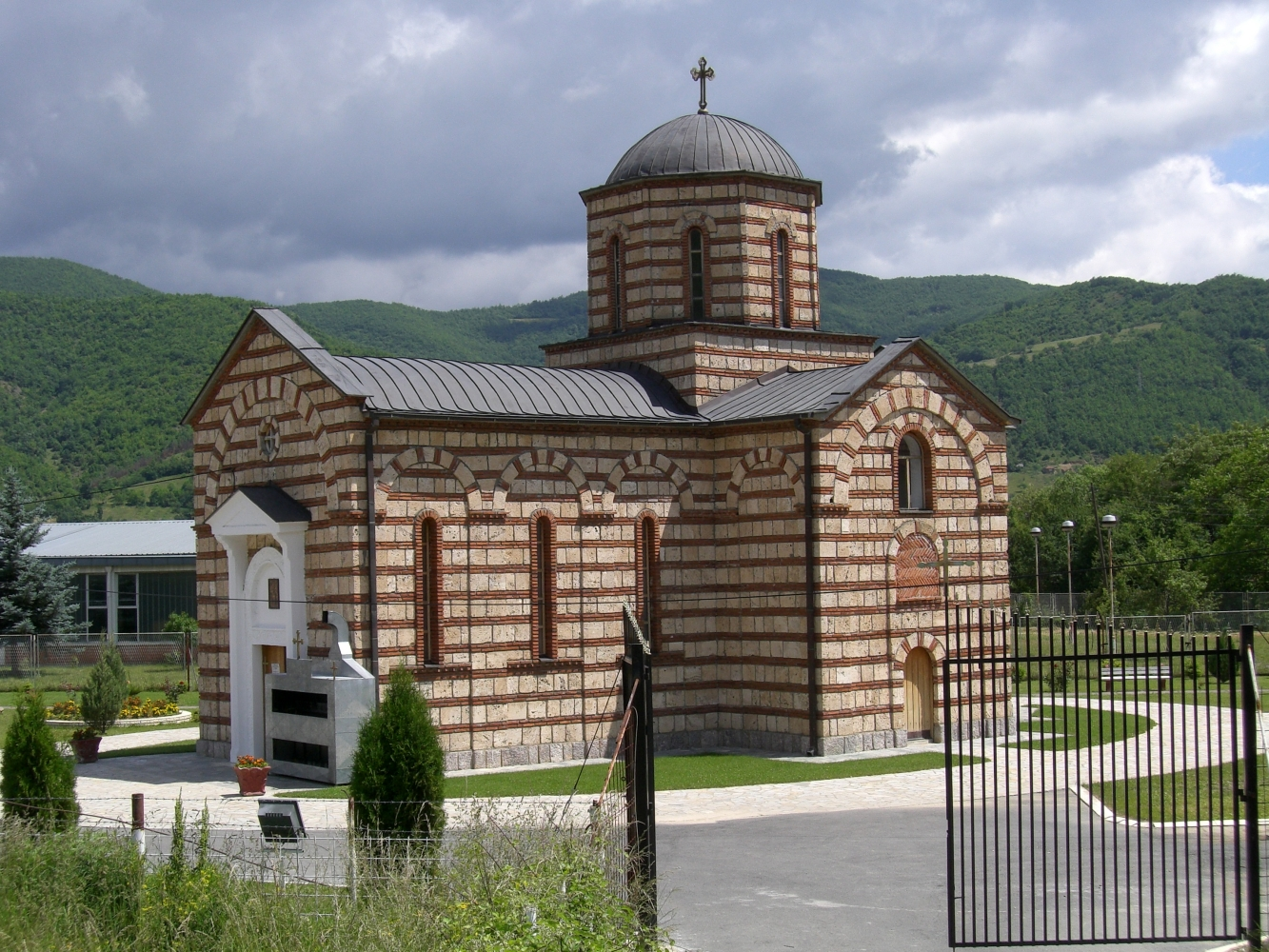
- Holy Trinity Church, Zubin Potok

- Emblem
- Interactive map of Zubin Potok
- Location within Kosovo
- Coordinates: 42°55′N 20°41′E
- Country: Kosovo
- District: District of Mitrovica
- Settlements: 64

Government
  - Mayor: Milos Perovic (SL)

Area
  - Total: 335 km^{2} (129 sq mi)
  - Land: 333 km^{2} (129 sq mi)
  - Rank: 16th in Kosovo
- Elevation: 567 m (1,860 ft)

Population (2015)
  - Total: 15,200
  - Density: 45.6/km^{2} (118/sq mi)
- est.
- Time zone: UTC+1 (CET)
  - Summer (DST): UTC+2 (CEST)
- Postal code: 40650
- Area code: +383(0)28
- Vehicle registration: 02
- Website: Official site

Zubin Potok (Albanian definite form: Zubin Potoku; Serbian Cyrillic: Зубин Поток) is a town and municipality located in the Mitrovica District in Kosovo. As of 2015, it has an estimated population of 15,200 inhabitants. It covers an area of 335 km^{2} (129 sq mi), and consists of the main town and 63 villages.

Zubin Potok is a part of North Kosovo, a region with an ethnic Serb majority. After the 2013 Brussels Agreement, the municipality is expected to become part of a proposed Community of Serb Municipalities.

== History ==
In the village of Vragë, an attack on the water channel that supplies water to the coal-fired power stations and drinking water to some municipalities was attacked. The attack was classified as a terrorist attack committed by the local Serb organization Civilna Zastita (Civil Protection).

== Settlements ==
Aside from the town of Zubin Potok, these villages comprise the municipality of Zubin Potok:

- Babiće / Babiq
- Banja / Banjë
- Brnjak / Bërnjak
- Bube / Bubë
- Čabra / Çabër
- Čečevo / Çeçevë
- Češanoviće / Çeshanovë
- Crepulja / Crepulë
- Čitluk / Çitluk
- Donje Varage / Varagë e Ulët
- Drajinoviće / Drainovë
- Dren
- Gornji Jasenovik / Jasenoviku i Epërm
- Gornji Strmac / Stramci i Epërm
- Jagnjenica
- Junake / Junce
- Kozarevo / Kozareva
- Krligate / Krligatë
- Lučka Reka / Lluçkarekë
- Međeđi Potok / Prroj i Megjës
- Oklace
- Rezala / Rezallë
- Rujište / Rujishtë
- Tušiće / Tushiqë
- Velika Kaludra / Kalludra e Madhe
- Velji Breg / Bregu i Madh
- Vojmisliće / Vojmisliq
- Zečeviće / Zeçevicë
- Zupče / Zupçë
- Padine

== Demographics ==
Historical population
| Year | Pop. | ±% p.a. |
|---|---|---|
| 1991 | 8,700 | — |
| 1999 | 12,000 | +4.10% |
| 2015 | 15,200 | +1.49% |

According to the 2011 estimations by the Government of Kosovo, Zubin Potok has 1,698 households and 6,616 inhabitants. In 2015 report by OSCE, the population of Zubin Potok municipality stands at 15,200 inhabitants.

=== Ethnic groups ===
The majority of Zubin Potok municipality is composed of Kosovo Serbs with more than 13,900 inhabitants (91.5%), while 1,300 (8.5%) Kosovo Albanians live in the municipality. Most of Zubin Potok's Kosovo Albanians live in the village of Çabër (Čabra).

The ethnic composition of the municipality of Zubin Potok, including IDPs:

| Ethnic group | 1991 est. | 1999 est. | 2015 est. |
|---|---|---|---|
| Serbs | 7,750 | 11,000 | 13,900 |
| Albanians | 850 | 850 | 1,300 |
| Others | 100 | - | - |
| Total | 8,700 | 12,000 | 15,200 |

== Economy ==
Zubin Potok is an agricultural community, yet the level of agricultural production has been in decrease due to the lack of investment. Local factories have been also strongly affected by the lack of consumers in the Albanian parts of Kosovo.

== Twin towns – sister cities ==
Zubin Potok is twinned with:

- Gradiška, Bosnia and Herzegovina, since 2021

== Gallery ==
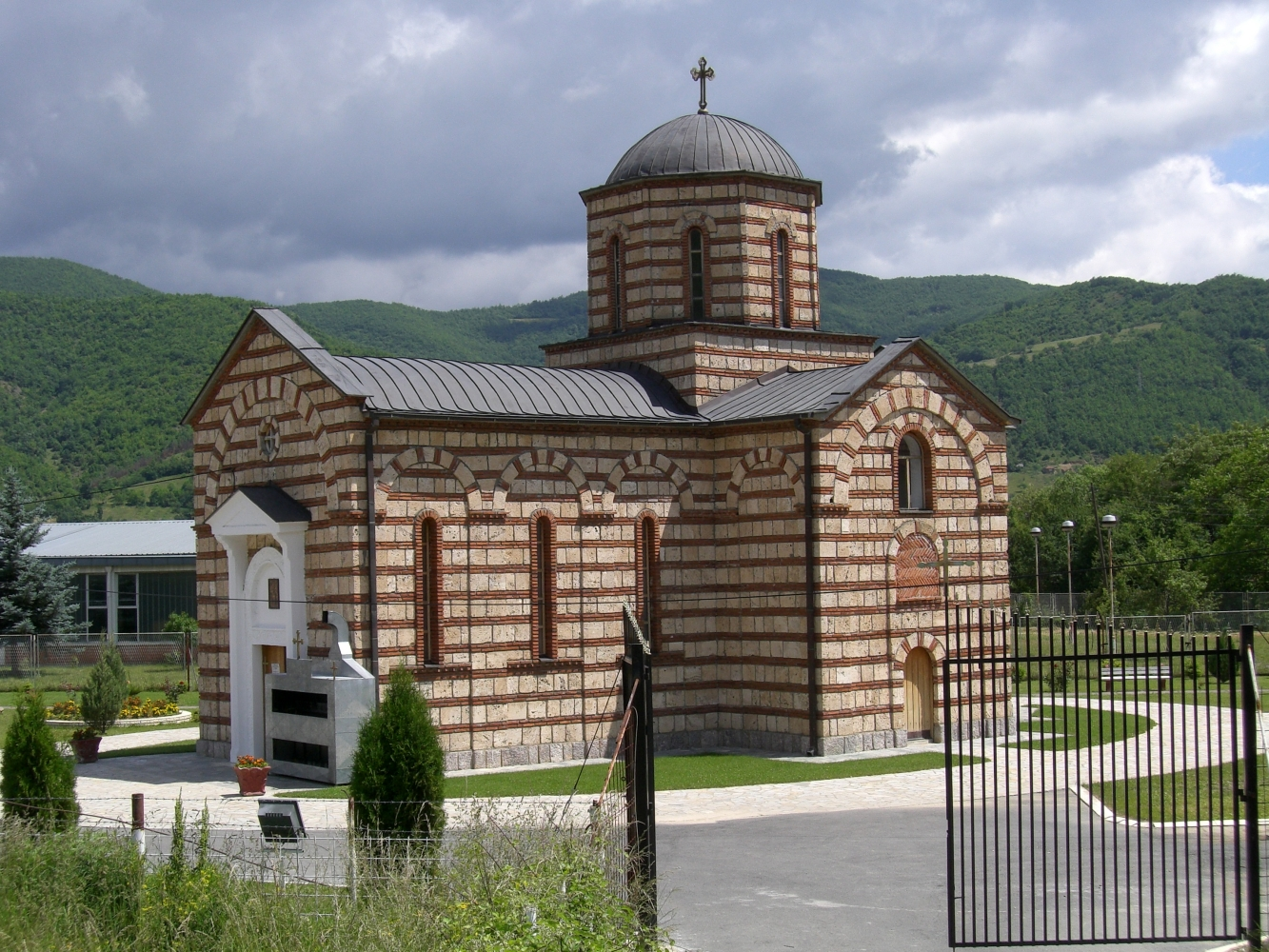
Holy Trinity Church in Zubin Potok

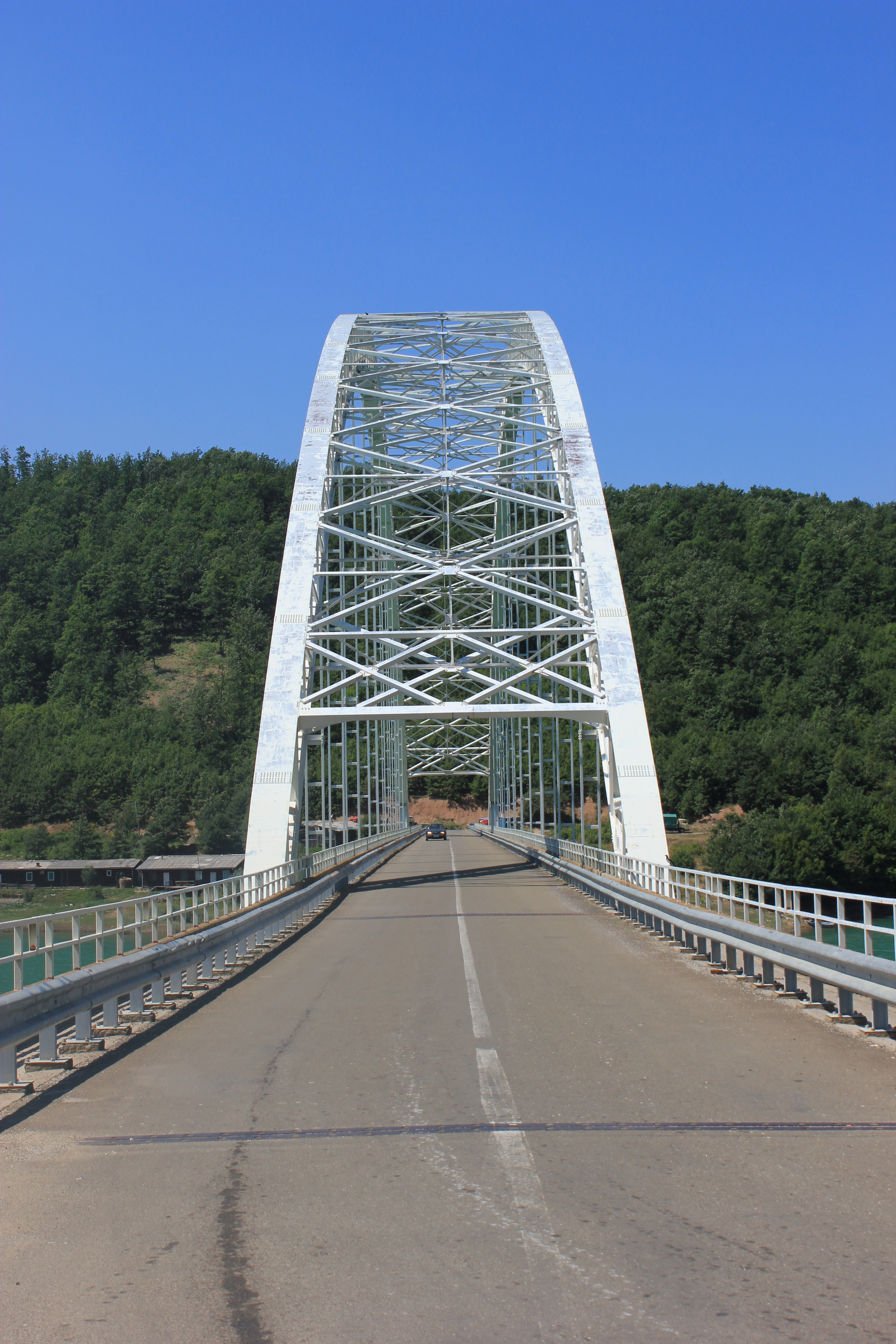
Brnjak Bridge near Gazivoda Lake

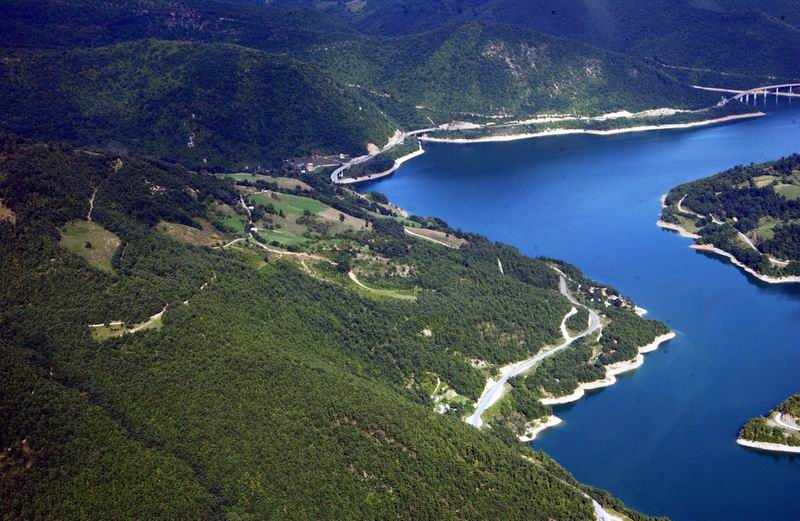
View above Gazivoda Lake

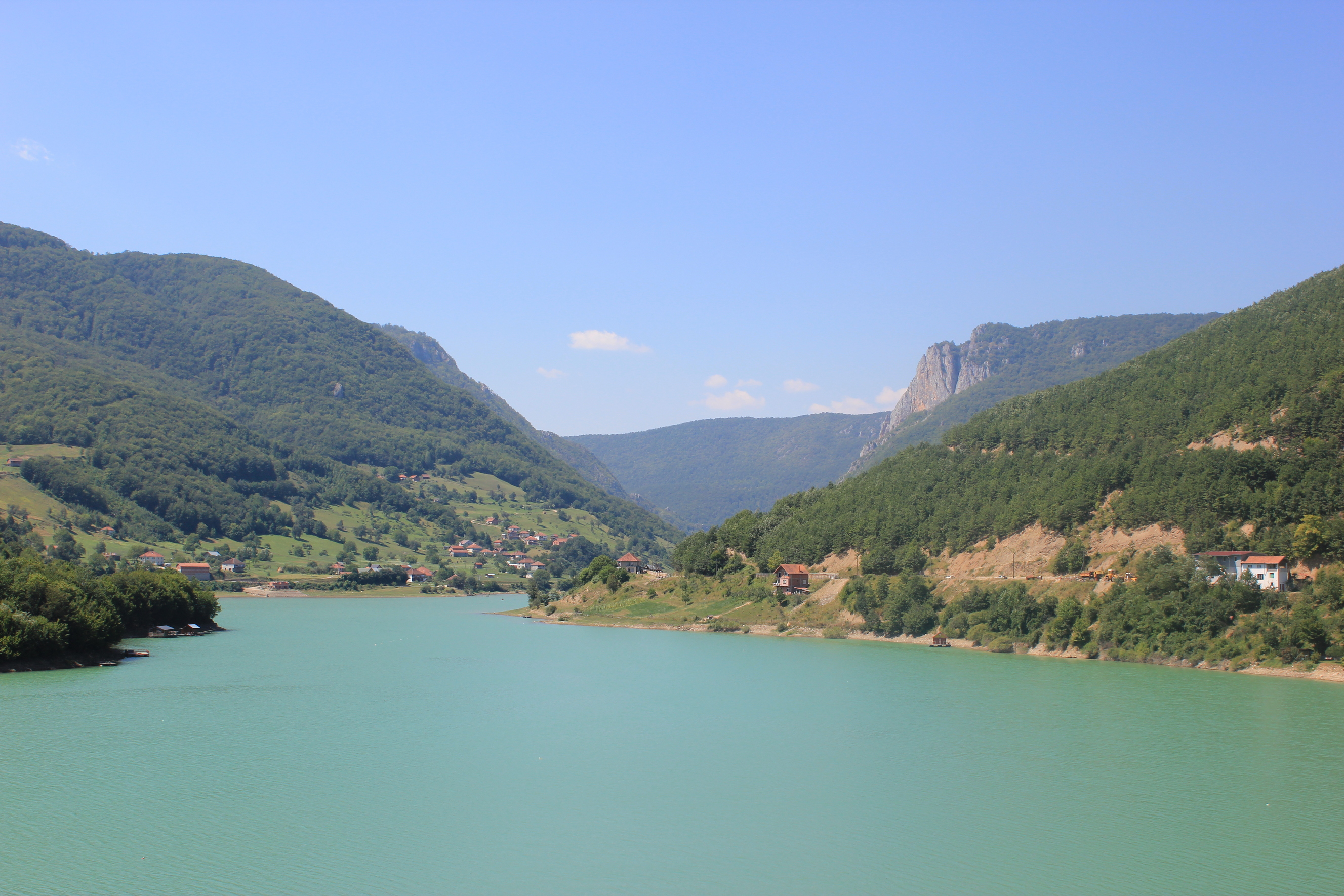
Gazivoda Lake

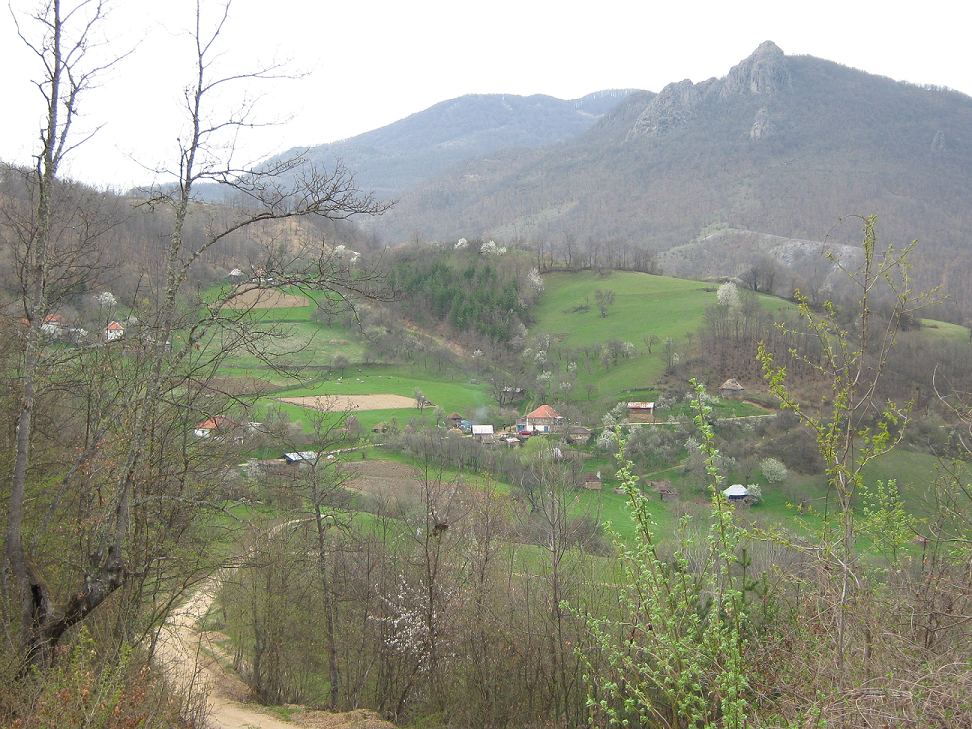
Village in Zubin Potok

== See also ==
- North Kosovo
- Community of Serb Municipalities
- District of Mitrovica
