= North Kosovo =

Geopolitical region in Kosovo

North Kosovo: Северно Косово / Severno Kosovo; Kosova Veriore
- Geopolitical region
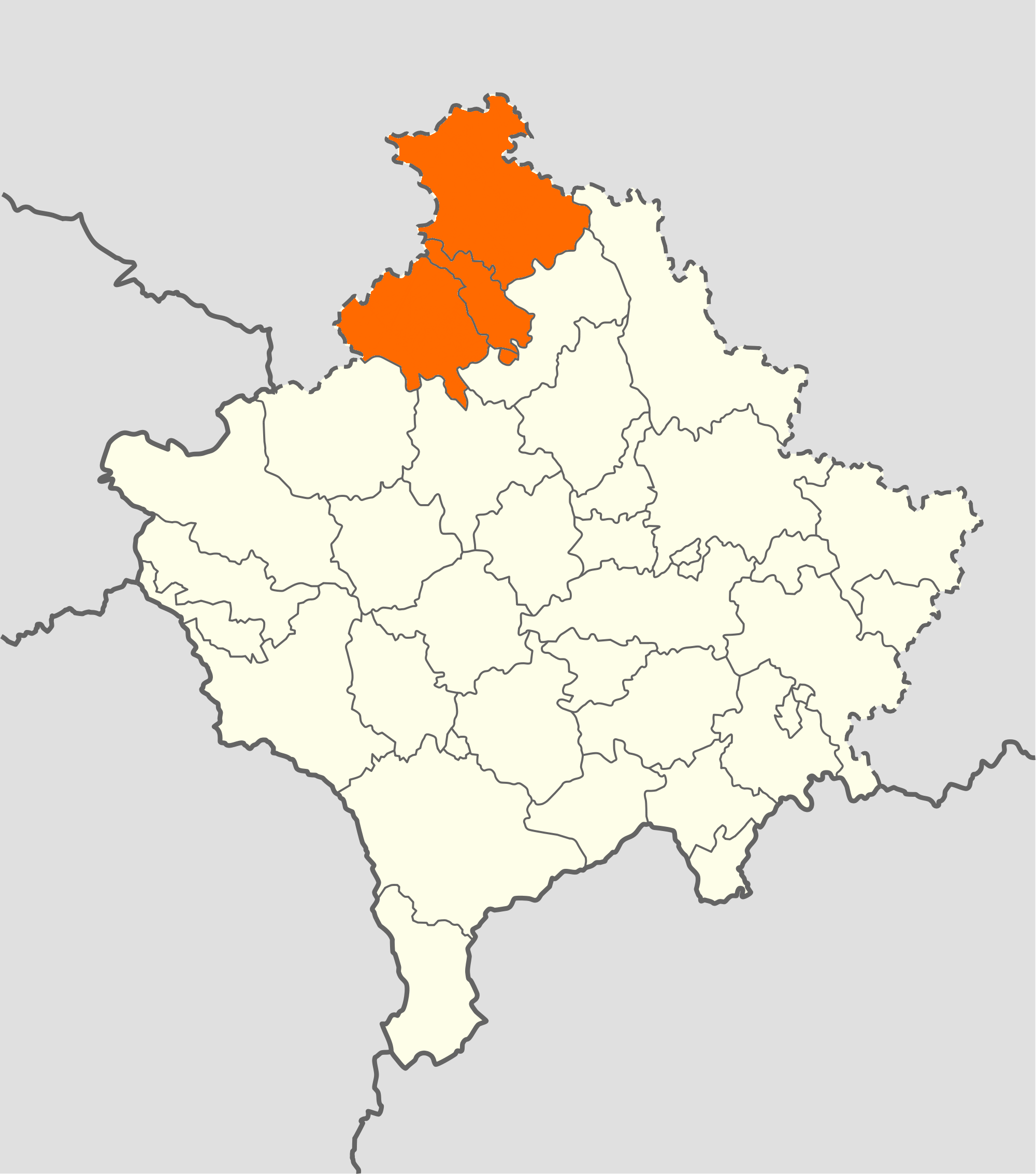
- North Kosovo is marked in orange
- Interactive map of North Kosovo
- Country: Kosovo
- Largest city: North Mitrovica

Area
  - Total: 1,007 km^{2} (389 sq mi)

Population
  - Estimate (2015): 79,910
  - Density: 48/km^{2} (120/sq mi)

North Kosovo (Serbian: Северно Косово / Severno Kosovo, Albanian: Kosova Veriore), also known as the Ibar Kolašin (Serbian: Ибарски Колашин / Ibarski Kolašin, Albanian: Koloshini i Ibrit or Kollashini i Ibrit), earlier Old Kolašin, (Serbian: Стари Колашин / Stari Kolašin, Albanian: Koloshini i Vjetër or Kollashini i Vjetër) and colloquially known as the North (Serbian: Север / Sever, Albanian: Veriu), is a region in the northern part of Kosovo, generally understood as a group of four municipalities where ethnic Kosovo Serbs are the majority: North Mitrovica, Leposavić, Zvečan, and Zubin Potok.

Until 2013, the region operated independently of Kosovo’s government structures, with Serbia-backed and financed so-called parallel institutions, as Serbs in North Kosovo refused to acknowledge and recognize the independence of Kosovo, declared in 2008. The Government of Kosovo opposed any kind of parallel institutions in the region. The parallel structures were abolished by the 2013 Brussels Agreement, signed between the governments of Kosovo and Serbia. Both governments agreed upon establishing a Community of Serb Municipalities, which includes all the ten majority-Serb municipalities in Kosovo, and agreed-upon with intention to give the Serb community greater autonomy in areas such as education, healthcare, urban planning, and economic development. Its implementation has been continuously derailed and has still not been established due to ongoing disagreements between Kosovo and Serbia over its powers and constitutionality.

== History ==
=== 2008–2011: Assembly of the Serb municipalities ===
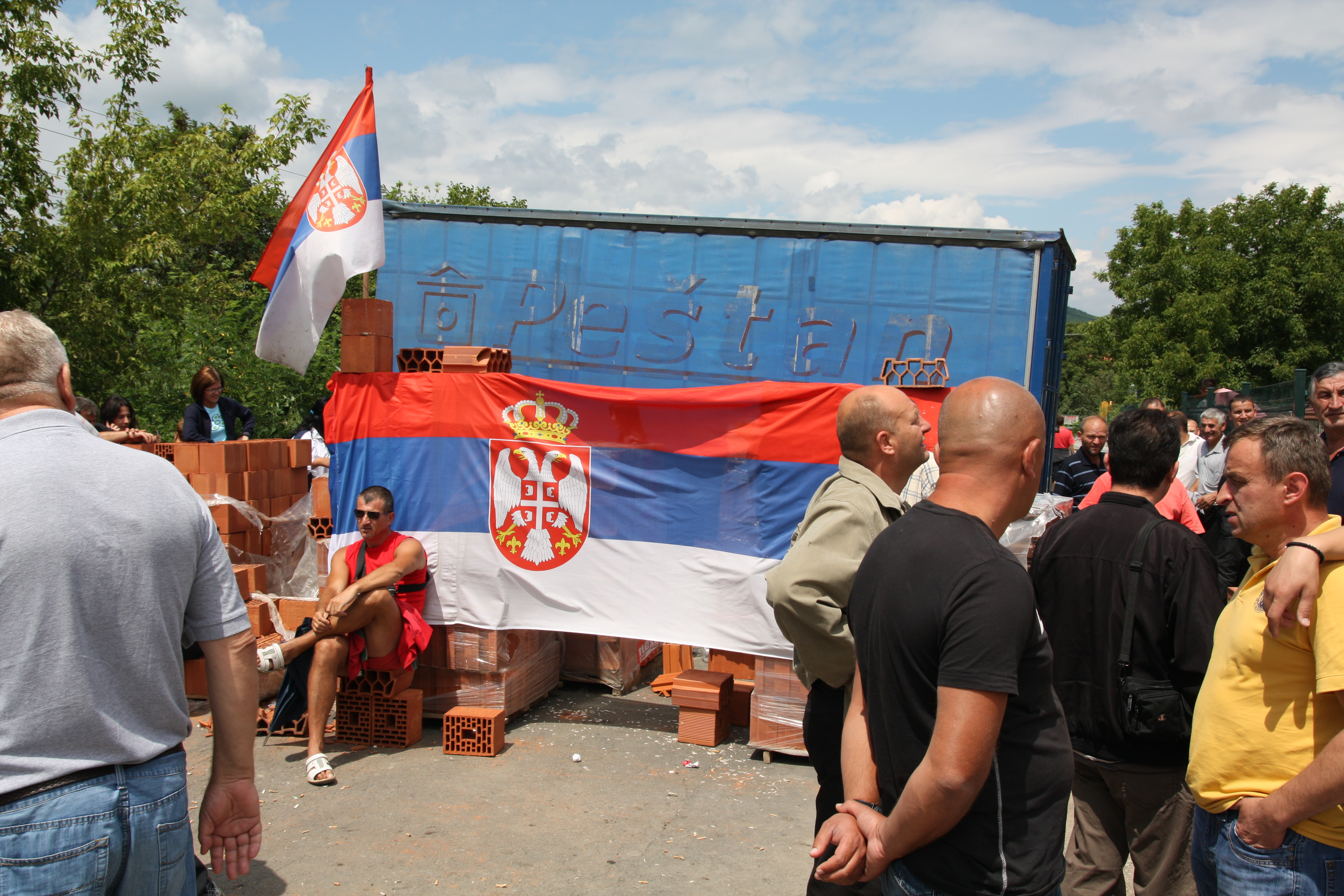
Serb barricades in Zvečan, following the 2011 border clashes

Following Kosovo's declaration of independence in 2008, Serbs put together the Community of Serb Municipalities, elected on 11 May and called by the Government of Serbia. The assembly was composed by 45 representatives. The North Kosovo Serbs had taken a consistently hard line, refusing to cooperate with the government in Pristina or to take up their seats in the Assembly of Kosovo. Their stance was encouraged by the Serbian government of Vojislav Koštunica and they remained in control of this area with their own structures.

Serb List (Serbian: Српска листа, romanized: Srpska lista) leader Oliver Ivanović and other Kosovo Serb leaders had expressed increasing frustration at Belgrade's approach and have voiced their support for a more moderate stance, speaking openly of rejoining the Assembly of Kosovo and taking part in its government. This line has proved highly controversial, as many Kosovo Serbs reject any compromise; in February 2004, Ivanović's car was destroyed by a bomb explosion outside his home in Mitrovica.

The Government of Serbia, Serb List, the Government of Kosovo and the United Nations all officially oppose the separation of North Kosovo. However, many Serbs in the region were adamantly opposed to living under the rule of an Albanian-majority provincial government and rejected an independent Kosovo. Ivanović has spoken out against partition, pointing out that more than 60,000 (50%) of the Serb population of Kosovo lives south of the Ibar, and that all of the important cultural and economic assets of the Kosovo Serbs are in the south of Kosovo.

In 2011, former President of Kosovo Behgjet Pacolli crossed into the Northern part of Mitrovica. It marked the first time that a high ranking Republic of Kosovo official visited Northern Kosovo. Such a symbolic gesture was accompanied by a heavy security presence.

=== 2011–2013: Brussels Agreement ===
On 25 July 2011, Kosovo Police crossed into the Serb-controlled municipalities to control several administrative border crossings, without consulting either Serbia, the Kosovo Force (KFOR) and the European Union Rule of Law Mission in Kosovo (EULEX).

In early 2013, the Prime Minister of Serbia Ivica Dačić encouraged all Serbs to participate in Kosovo elections. The vast majority of Serbs turned out in large numbers to participate in elections held by the Kosovo government with symbols of the Republic of Kosovo Central Elections Commission on the ballot.

With the signatory of the Brussels Agreement in April 2013, Serbia officially dropped its support for the assembly and the parallel structures in Northern Kosovo. Both governments, of Kosovo and Serbia agreed upon creating the Community of Serb Municipalities. According to the agreement:

- Its assembly will have no legislative authority and the judicial authorities will be integrated and operate within the Kosovo legal framework.
- There will be one police force in Kosovo called the Kosovo Police.
- All police in northern Kosovo shall be integrated into the Kosovo Police framework.
- Salaries will solely be paid by the KP.
- The Appellate court in Pristina will establish a panel composed of a majority of Kosovo Serbs judges to deal with all Kosovo Serb majority municipalities.

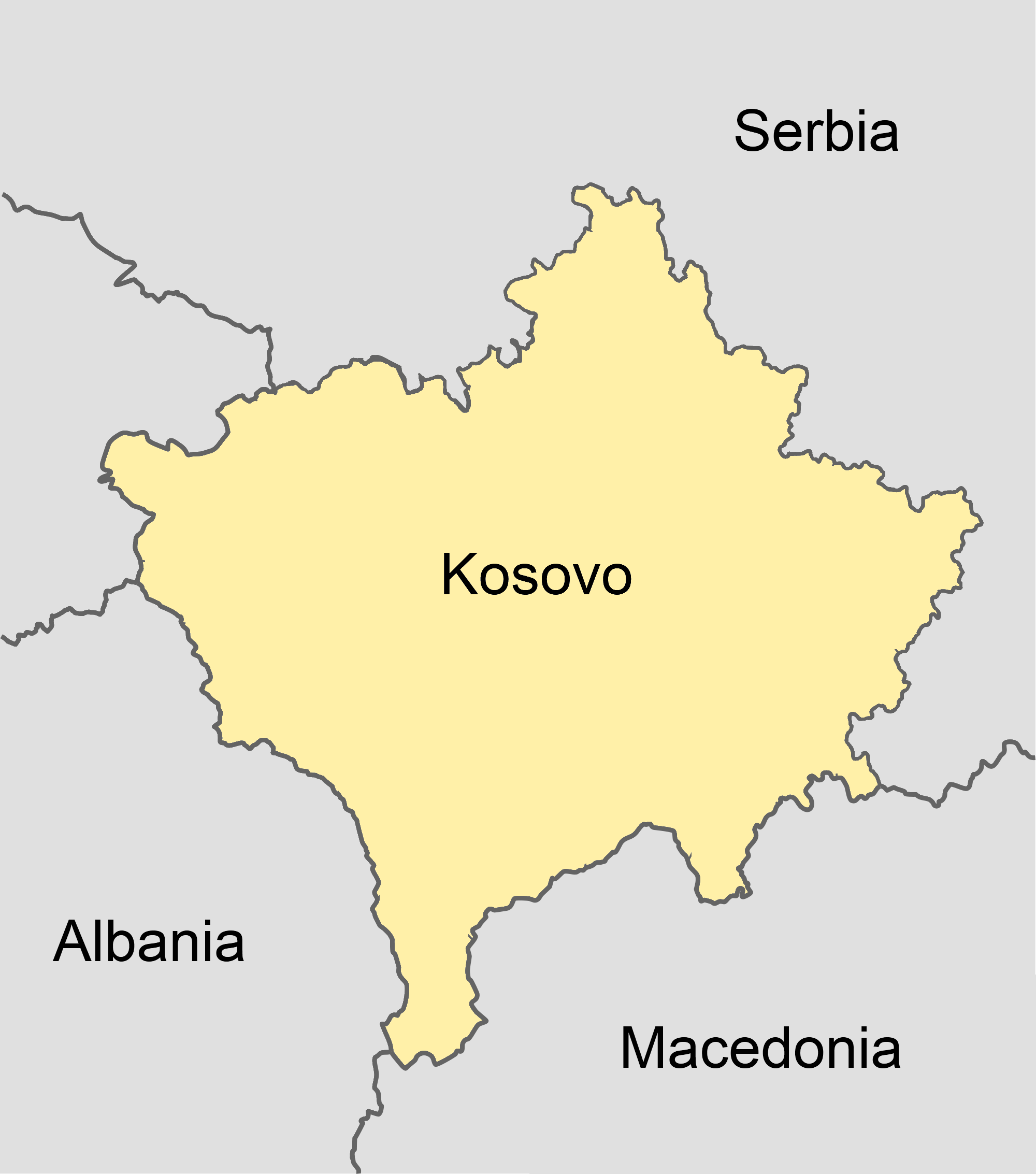
Partition of Kosovo proposed by some Serbian politicians

As the final stage of dialogue between Serbia and Kosovo was near, various officials from Serbia have stated that the partition of Kosovo, with Serbia getting North Kosovo, is the best solution. President of Serbia Aleksandar Vučić said on August 9 that he is for the division of Kosovo. The same could be heard from Minister of Foreign Affairs Ivica Dačić and Defense Minister Aleksandar Vulin. Some Albanian politicians stated that the exchange of territories may be the solution of the Serbia-Kosovo dispute (with Serbia annexing North Kosovo and Kosovo annexing Preševo Valley), although many others rejected this proposal.

=== 2021 North Kosovo crisis ===
In 2021, the Government of Kosovo decided to reciprocally ban Serbian license plates. Owning a Serbian license plate meant that those individuals would have had to switch for Kosovar license plates at a government vehicle registration center.

Kosovar vehicle registration centers in Zvečan and Zubin Potok were targeted by arsonists. Relations with both states during protests worsened as the Serbian Military was put on heightened alert. On 30 September, an agreement was reached to end the license plate ban, taking effect on 4 October, which led to Kosovar license plates in Serbia and Serbian license plates in Kosovo now have their national symbols and country codes covered with a temporary sticker.

=== North Kosovo crisis (2022–2026) ===
The expiration of the eleven-year validity period of documents for cars on 1 August 2022 reignited tensions between Government of Kosovo and the Serbs in North Kosovo. After a Kosovo announcement that Serbian citizens who enter Kosovo will receive entry and exit documents, a number of barricades were created in North Kosovo, but were removed after the postponing of the ban.

In August 2022, unsuccessful negotiations regarding license plates were held, although the ID document dispute was solved. Serbia later submitted a request to KFOR to deploy 1,000 Serbian troops to Kosovo, which was declined. In April 2023, Serbs boycotted the local elections, which led to ethnic Albanian mayors elected in all four North Kosovo municipalities. In May, Kosovo police took control of the North Kosovo municipal buildings by force to install the elected mayors, resulting in protests and clashes. Kosovo later banned all Serbian vehicle license plates from entering its territory and imports from Serbia after 3 police officers were arrested.

On 24 September 2023, approximately 30 Serb militants led by Milan Radoičić, attacked Kosovo police in the village of Banjska before barricading themselves inside the Banjska monastery. Kosovo forces later recaptured the village and monastery, seizing multiple arsenals of weapons along with drones, APC's and ATV's. The incident resulted in the death of a Kosovo police officer and three of the militants.

An agreement was reached with Serbia and Kosovo, stating that Serbia would implement the 2011 agreement on license plates which would recognize Kosovo license plates starting on 1 January 2024.

In February 2024, the Kosovar government banned the use of the Serbian dinar as a payment in Kosovo and North Kosovo. The move was criticized by the U.S. and E.U. since the Serb minority relies on financial assistance and social benefit payments from the government of Serbia.

== Geography ==
North Kosovo is rich in mineral resources, once known for the Trepča mining complex. In the northern part of the region north Kosovo, there is a ridge of the mountain Kopaonik, with the peak of Šatorica, 1,770 metres (5,810 ft), above of the town Leposavić. The southern boundary is the river Ibar, which divides the towns of Mitrovica and North Mitrovica. On the west by Zubin Potok, the mountain ranges of Rogozna and Mokra Gora with the peak of Berim, 1,731 metres (5,679 ft), which separates one from the other lake Gazivode.

== Demographics ==
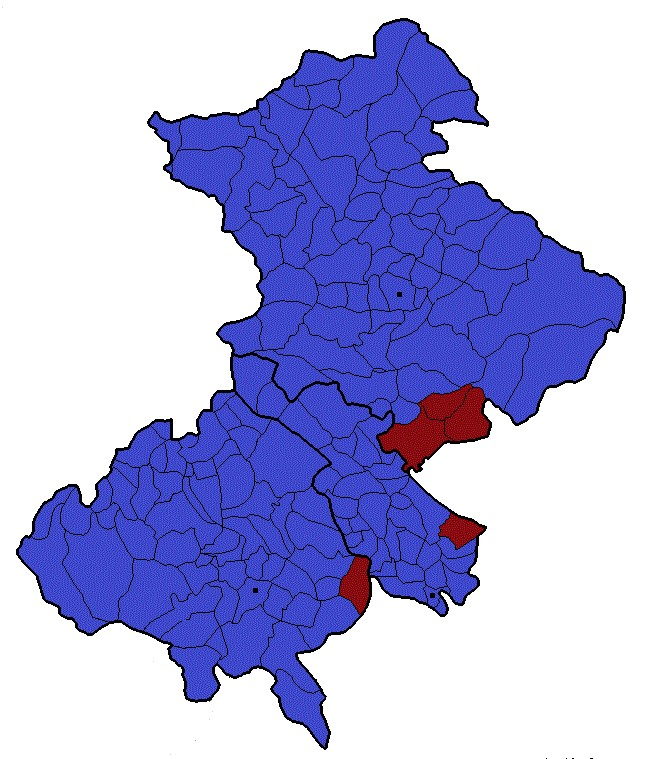
Ethnic map of North Kosovo (blue-majority Serbs, red-majority Albanians)

North Kosovo consists of four municipalities, Leposavić, Zvečan, Zubin Potok, and North Mitrovica. It covers 1,007 km^{2} (389 sq. mi.), or 9.97% of Kosovo's land area. Owing to its border with Serbia proper, North Kosovo is not, strictly speaking, a "Serb enclave" or "Serb exclave".

Before the Kosovo War, the area was predominantly inhabited by Serbs, with a substantial Kosovo Albanians minority and smaller populations of Bosniaks and Roma. The 1991 census recorded 50,500 people in the municipalities of Leposavić, Zvečan and Zubin Potok, of whom the vast majority were Serbs, with a small number of Albanians, and other smaller minorities, though the Statistical Office of Kosovo regards the accuracy of this census as "questionable" given that most Albanians boycotted it. The population of the Mitrovica municipality was predominantly Albanian, with the town itself and two of the nearby villages being ethnically mixed.

Mitrovica was split between Serbs and Albanians at the end of the war, with the Ibar River marking the dividing line. North Mitrovica, which is now home to approximately 22,500 Serbs and 7,000 members of other ethnic groups, is recognized since 2013 as a separate municipality by the Government of Kosovo.

In 2018, the Organization for Security and Co-operation in Europe estimated that the population of Leposavić, Zvečan, Zubin Potok and North Mitrovica stands at 48,500 inhabitants. Of these, around 42,500 (87%) are Serbs, 5,000 (10%) Albanians, 1,000 (3%) Bosniaks and others.

| Municipality | District | Area in km^{2} | Population |
|---|---|---|---|
| North Mitrovica | Mitrovica | 11 | 29,460 |
| Leposavić | Mitrovica | 539 | 18,600 |
| Zvečan | Mitrovica | 122 | 16,650 |
| Zubin Potok | Mitrovica | 335 | 15,200 |
| Total | | 1,007 | 79,910 |

== Economy ==
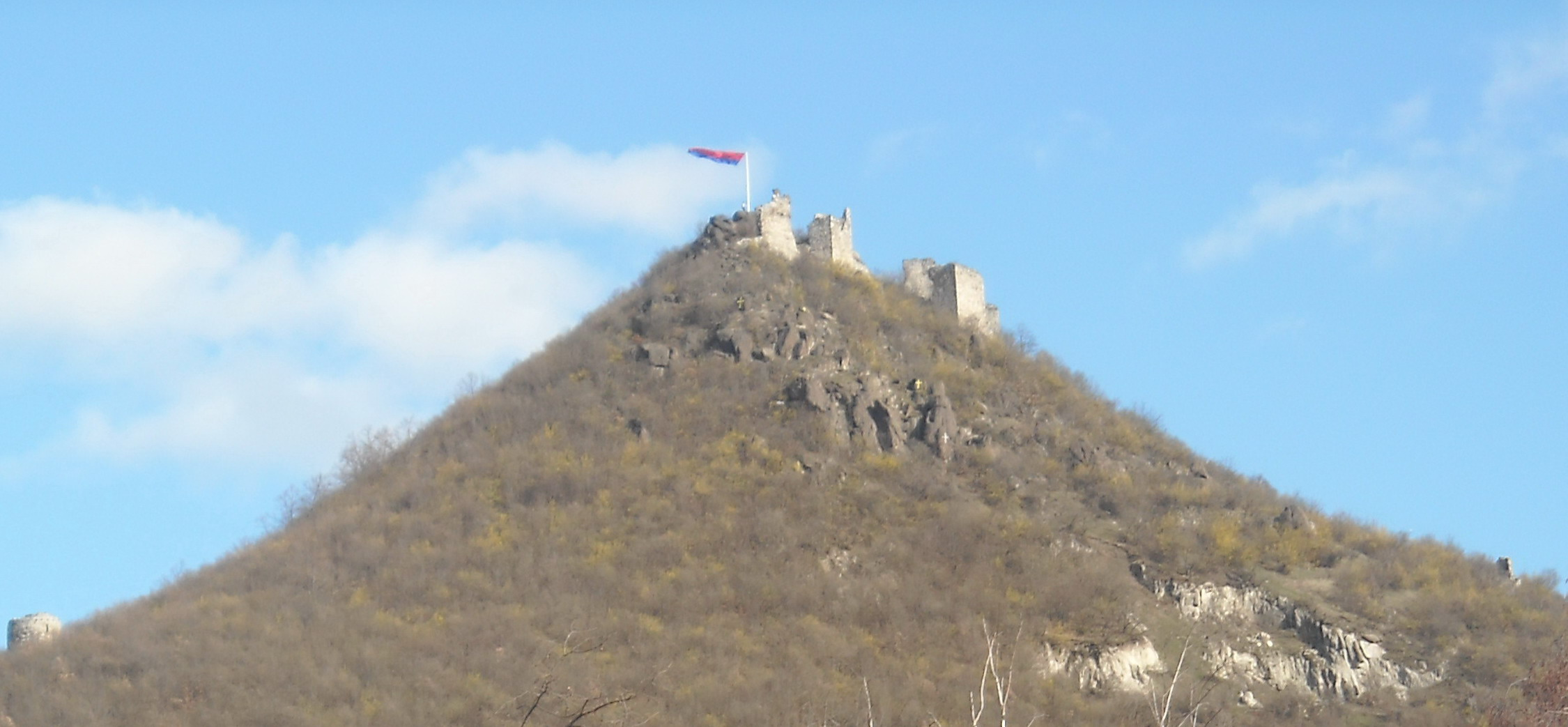
Zvečan Fortress located in the northwest part of North Mitrovica

The region suffers from high unemployment. The economic situation has deteriorated significantly in recent years due to a lack of capital investment, exacerbated by the uncertainty caused by the political dispute over the region's future. The region has used the Serbian dinar rather than the euro. However, in February 2024, the Kosovar government banned the use of the dinar for payment, requiring all regions to use the euro. Kosovo PM Kurti later clarified that the currency was not banned but that the Euro would be the only legal currency for commercial transactions and that there would be a months-long transition period to ease in the new legislation. Smuggling of goods such as alcohol has become a business in North Kosovo where the customs regulations of the Kosovo authorities are unable to be enforced. The Kosovo customs authorities do, however, attempt to curtail the flow of illegal goods from North Kosovo into the rest of Kosovo and have an elaborate network of surveillance cameras in place in that regard. Smugglers transport goods over the porous frontier between Central Serbia and North Kosovo.

The Serb-majority population refuse to recognize Kosovo as an independent state and have consequently not paid for electricity for more than two decades, since the Kosovo War. As a result, the energy-intensive industry of cryptomining, especially of Bitcoin, is especially profitable, even though it is banned. The electricity used is estimated to cost about 12 million euros annually. The total amount of electricity consumed in the year 2021 in northern Kosovo is 372 GWh, that in terms of electric power consumption per capita is at 7,670 kWh, while the average for Kosovo is 3,185 kWh. This big differences accounts because of the illegal cryptomining in northern Kosovo.

== Politics and the rule of law ==
=== Politics ===
Since 1999, the institutions of the Serb-majority North Kosovo have been de facto governed by Serbia. It used Serbian national symbols and participated in Serbian national elections, which are boycotted in the rest of Kosovo; and in turn, it boycotted Kosovo's elections. The municipalities of Leposavić, Zvečan and Zubin Potok are run by local Serbs, while the Mitrovica municipality had rival Serb and Albanian governments until a compromise was agreed in November 2002, whereby the city has one mayor. Serbs were active participants in the Kosovo Elections of 2013.

The region united into a community, the Union of Serbian Districts and District Units of Kosovo and Metohija established in February 2008 by Serbian delegates meeting in Mitrovica, which has since served as North Kosovo's capital. The Union's President is Dragan Velić. This union is not recognised by Kosovo or by UNMIK, which was abolished in 2013 as a result of the Brussels Agreement.

There is also a central governing body, the Serbian National Council for Kosovo and Metohija (SNV). The President of the SNV in North Kosovo is Dr. Milan Ivanović, while the head of its Executive Council is Rada Trajković. Local politics are dominated by the Serbian List for Kosovo. The Serbian List was led by Oliver Ivanović, an engineer from Mitrovica.

North Kosovo is by far the largest of the Serb-dominated areas within Kosovo, and unlike the others, directly borders Central Serbia. This had facilitated its ability to govern itself almost completely independently of the Kosovo institutions in a de facto state of partition; the authorities in turn chose to observe Belgrade's direct rule, which was generally recognised as the legal authority over Kosovo as a whole until the 1998–1999 Kosovo War. However, despite the region being contiguous with Central Serbia, its location within Kosovo and the subsequent conditions of the Kumanovo Treaty in 1999 mean that UNMIK officials have freedom of movement in North Kosovo whereby they assume supervisory status whilst no institution (e.g. police) is in place to enforce Serbian central directives which apply to the rest of Serbia. Before the 2008 Kosovo declaration of independence, it had been speculated that Kosovo might be partitioned with North Kosovo remaining part of Serbia. The complexity of the region has been on the agenda of the 2011 Pristina–Belgrade Talks. In November 2012, Prime Minister of Kosovo Hashim Thaçi stated that autonomy for Northern Kosovo will never be granted, and the region will always remain a part of the Republic of Kosovo.

=== Rule of law ===
Law enforcement and green border checkpoints are carried out by KFOR, EULEX and Kosovo Police. According to an International Crisis Group report, covert agents of Serbian police also operate in the area. North Mitrovica in particular remains a hot spot for organized crime.

== Sports ==
Due to Serbian refusal of Kosovo institutions, Serbs in this part of Kosovo acted independently in sport. For example, the Football First League of North Kosovo was primarily formed of Serbian clubs from four of North Kosovo's municipalities. Now the clubs like Trepča or FK Mokra Gora do not play anymore in North Kosovo but in Raška or Novi Pazar which was accepted by Zoran Gajić, the Serbian minister of sports.

== Gallery ==
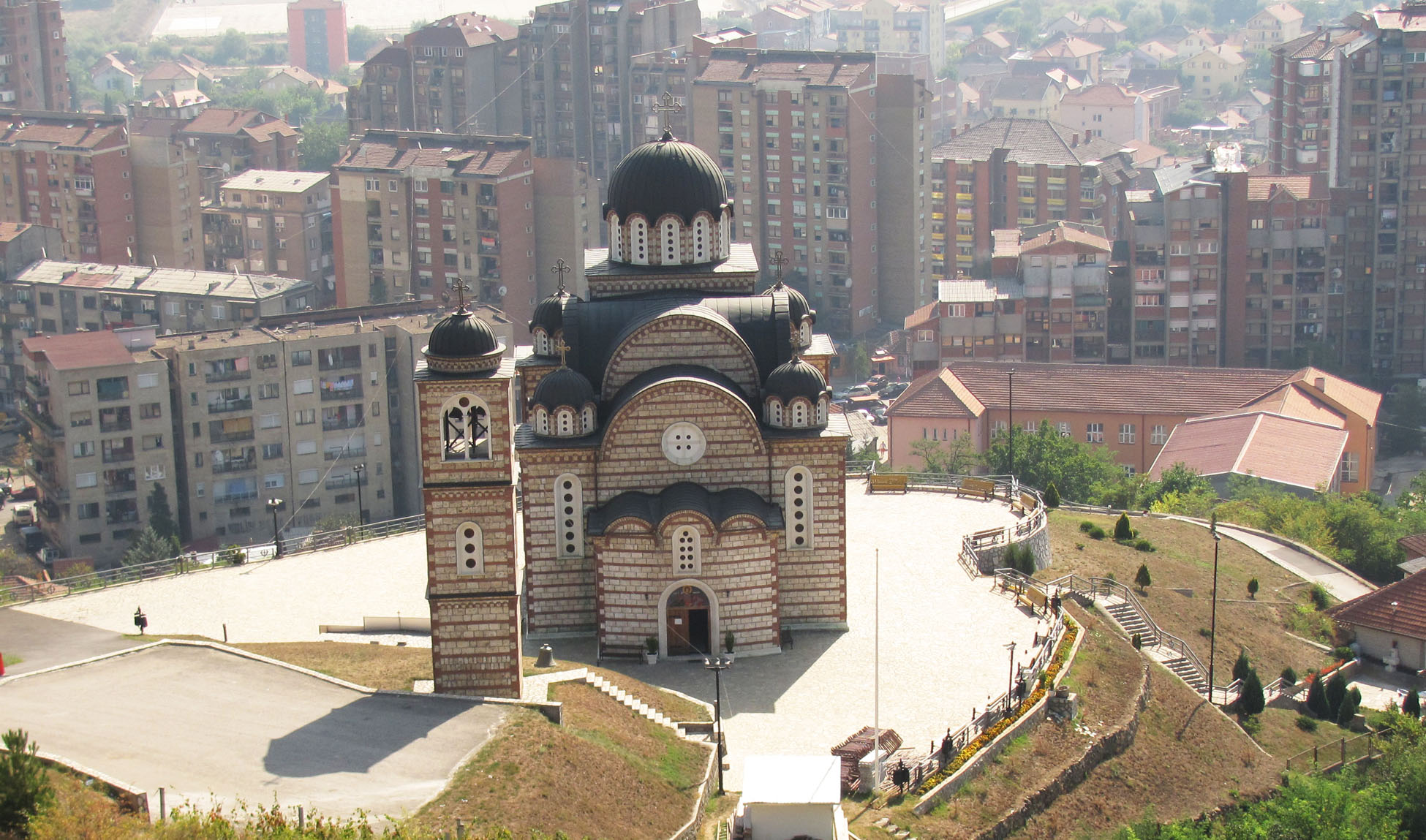
North Mitrovica

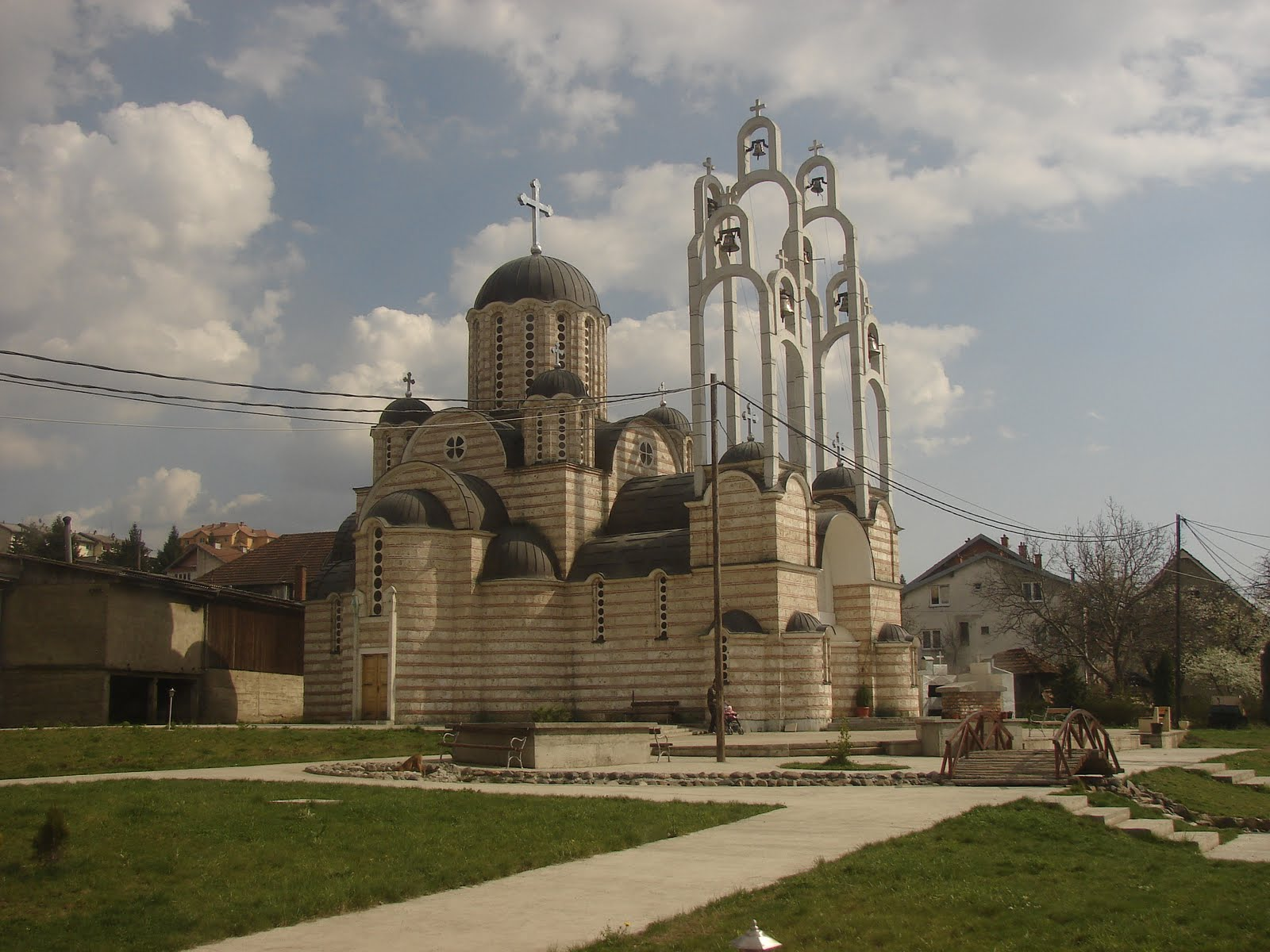
Leposavić

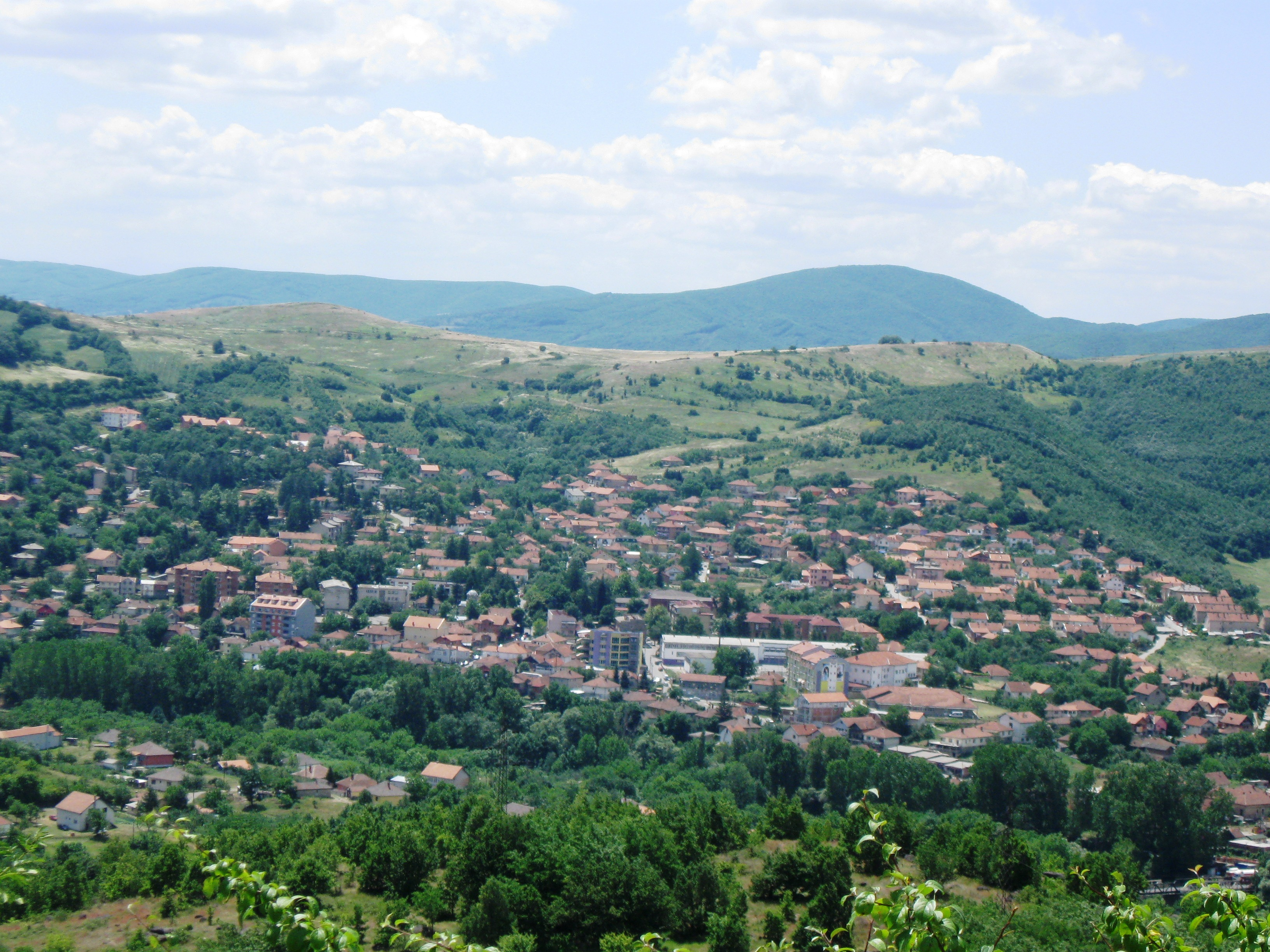
Zvečan

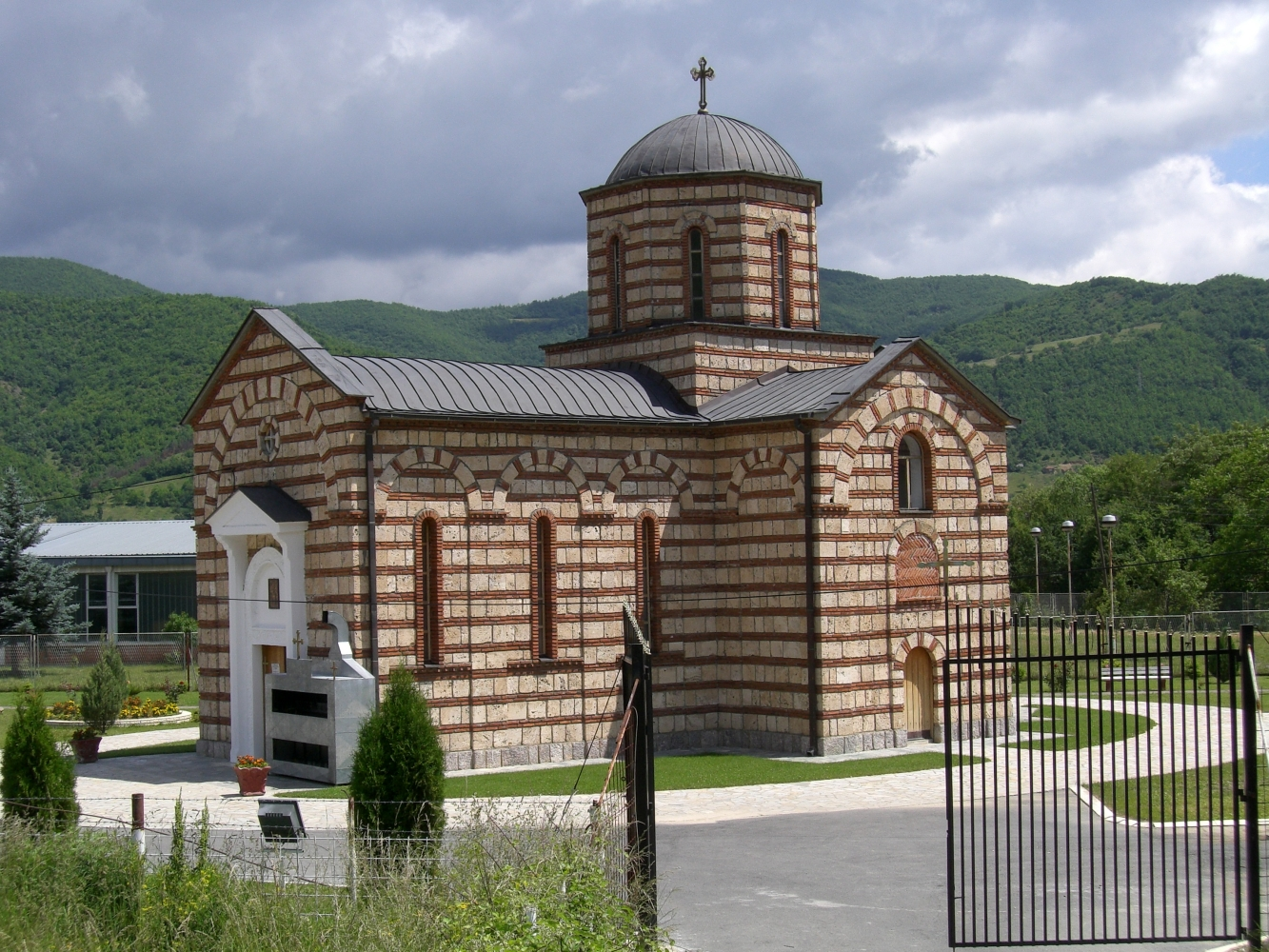
Zubin Potok

== Notable people ==
- Isa Boletini – nationalist figure and guerrilla fighter
- Rexhep Mitrovica – politician, 20th Prime Minister of Albania
- Xhevdet Peci – boxer
- Milan Biševac – football player
- Miloš Krasić – football player
- Nikola Lazetić – football player
- Stevan Stojanović – football player
- Nevena Božović – singer

== See also ==
- Kosovo Serbs
- Partition of Kosovo
