= Ljubomir Marić =

Serbian politician

- Љубомир Марић
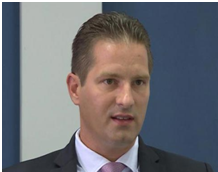

National Assembly of Serbia
- Incumbent
- Assumed office 3 August 2020

Assistant Director of the Office for Kosovo and Metohija
- Incumbent
- Assumed office 14 March 2017
- Prime Minister: Aleksandar Vučić; Ana Brnabić
- Director: Marko Đurić; Petar Petković

Minister of Administration and Local Government of Kosovo
- In office 9 December 2014 – 16 December 2016
- Prime Minister: Isa Mustafa
- Preceded by: Slobodan Petrović
- Succeeded by: Mirjana Jevtić

Personal details
- Born: 1977 (age 48–49) Knin, SR Croatia, SFR Yugoslavia
- Party: Serbian Progressive Party; Serb List

Ljubomir Marić (Serbian Cyrillic: Љубомир Марић, Albanian: Ljubomir Mariq; born 1977) is a politician in Serbia and Kosovo. He was minister of administration and local government in the government of Kosovo from 2014 to 2016 as a representative of the Serb List. He was later elected to the National Assembly of Serbia in the 2020 Serbian parliamentary election. Marić is a member of the Serbian Progressive Party.

== Private life ==
Marić was born in 1977 in Knin, in what was then the Socialist Republic of Croatia in the Socialist Federal Republic of Yugoslavia. When he was eighteen years old in 1995, he and his family fled Knin during Operation Storm and settled in Kosovska Mitrovica in Kosovo and Metohija. He has a master's degree in management.

== Government minister in Kosovo ==
The Serb List entered Kosovo's coalition government following the 2013 Brussels Agreement, which normalized some relations between the governments of Serbia and Kosovo without resolving the status of the territory. Marić was appointed as one of two Serb List representatives in government in 2014, serving as minister of administration and local self-government. He took part in the continuing negotiations in Brussels, which focused on the planned establishment of the Community of Serb Municipalities (Zajednica srpskih opština, ZSO) among other matters. In a May 2015 interview, he said that the ZSO was necessary for the survival of Serbs in Kosovo and Metohija. He added that there had been no will to create the ZSO prior to the formation of Isa Mustafa's administration and that the involvement of the Serb List in government had precipitated the change. (The establishment of the ZSO was subsequently postponed, and as of 2020 it has still not occurred.)

Marić was a frequent spokesperson for the Serb community in Kosovo during his time in government. In February 2016, he indicated that the community would put forward its own candidate in the 2016 Kosovan presidential election to pursue the formation of the ZSO. He later said that Serb delegates would not take part in local committee discussions as to the status of the Trepča Mines, saying that the question should be resolved in Brussels.

Marić was dismissed from government on 16 December 2016 and replaced with another representative of the Serb community. This decision was condemned by the Progressive Party, which blamed manoeuvring by local members of the Movement of Socialists on the Serb List. (This did not ultimately affect the alliance between the Progressives and the Movement of Socialists in the government of Serbia.) Prime Minister Mustafa defended the decision, saying he did not have confidence in Marić as a minister and accusing Marić of making statements contrary to government policy.

On 14 March 2017, the government of Serbia appointed Marić as assistant director of the Office for Kosovo and Metohija. In this capacity, he continued to have oversight in the process of establishing the ZSO. Following the 2017 Kosovan parliamentary election, he complained to the Organization for Security and Co-operation in Europe (OSCE) that some Serbs had been denied the franchise.

== Member of the National Assembly of Serbia ==
Marić received the fifty-second position on the Progressive Party's Aleksandar Vučić — For Our Children electoral list in the 2020 parliamentary election and was elected when the list won a landslide victory with 188 mandates. He is a member of the assembly committee on Kosovo-Metohija, a deputy member of the culture and information committee, the leader of Serbia's parliamentary friendship group with the Central African Republic, and a member the friendship groups with Australia, the Bahamas, Botswana, Brazil, Cameroon, Chile, China, Comoros, Croatia, Cyprus, the Dominican Republic, Ecuador, Equatorial Guinea, Eritrea, Grenada, Guinea-Bissau, Ireland, Jamaica, Kyrgyzstan, Laos, Liberia, Madagascar, Mali, Mauritius, Mexico, Mozambique, Nauru, Nicaragua, Nigeria, Palau, Papua New Guinea, Paraguay, the Philippines, Portugal, the Republic of Congo, Russia, Saint Vincent and the Grenadines, Sao Tome and Principe, Solomon Islands, South Africa, South Sudan, Spain, Sri Lanka, Sudan, Suriname, Togo, Trinidad and Tobago, the United Kingdom, the United States of America, Uruguay, and Uzbekistan.
