= Belgrade–Pristina Dialogue =

EU-facilitated talks between the governments of Serbia and Kosovo

The Belgrade–Pristina Dialogue was a negotiation process facilitated by the European Union that sought to normalize relations between Serbia and Kosovo. Serbia claims Kosovo as its southern province under United Nations administration, and rejects its independence. Kosovo considers Serbia as a neighboring state. The negotiations began in March 2011, three years after Kosovo declared independence. They are the first negotiations between the two entities since Kosovo declared independence in February 2008.

== Background ==
The Republic of Kosovo declared independence on 17 February 2008, and has been partially recognized internationally. Serbia introduced a draft-resolution on 8 October 2008 in the UN General Assembly, which sought the opinion of the International Court of Justice on Kosovo's declaration of independence. The ICJ delivered its Advisory Opinion on 22 July 2010 concluding that Kosovo's “declaration of independence of Kosovo adopted on 17 February 2008 did not violate international law." After the verdict Serbia and the European Union submitted a draft-resolution to the United Nations General Assembly. On 9 September 2010, the UN General Assembly adopted Resolution 64/298, which recognized the Advisory Opinion of the ICJ and welcomed "the readiness of the European Union to facilitate a process of dialogue between the parties." According to Resolution 64/298, the dialogue process "would be a factor for peace, security and stability in the region, [...]promote cooperation, achieve progress on the path to the European Union and improve the lives of the people." The talks were delayed due to the collapse of the Kosovar government, forcing Kosovo into early elections.

The mandate of the EU is to facilitate the dialogue between the two parties with the end goal of normalizing relations between Serbia and Kosovo. As such, the process is closely related to the EU accession process of both Serbia and Kosovo, which is seen as mutual goal of the parties and is being used as an incentive by the EU. For Serbia, progress in the dialogue and in the implementation of agreements reached and in the normalization of relations and rule of law conditionality are fundamental to advance in EU accession negotiations. Similarly, Kosovo's fulfilment of its milestones along the EU path – such as the signing of its Stabilization and Association Agreement with the European Union or getting access to EU funds – is conditioned upon progress made in the dialogue and in its rule of law reforms.

The dialogue is held in Brussels and is facilitated by the European Union High Representative/Vice President of the European Commission, and the European External Action Service (EEAS) team. Meetings and working groups are convened at the technical – at chief negotiators' level – and political – at Prime Ministers' and/or Presidents' levels. The first meeting was held on 8-9 March 2011 between the chief negotiators from Serbia and Kosovo.

== Initial talks ==
The talks were first mediated by Robert Cooper. Oliver Ivanović said that Belgrade and Pristina were urged to continue talks in Brussels, but Serbia is not obliged to recognize Kosovo at any point in the process. Borko Stefanović led the Belgrade negotiating team and Edita Tahiri led the Pristina negotiating team.

The talks began on 8 March 2011 and featured three main issues:

- Regional cooperation
- Freedom of movement
- Rule of law.

=== First round ===
The first round of dialogue took place on 8–9 March 2011 and covered economic co-operation between the two parties. Other issues on the agenda during the first round of dialogue were telecommunications, air traffic, customs seals, land books and civil records.

=== Second round ===
The second round of negotiations was delayed until 28 March 2011. Issues discussed in the second round of talks were electricity and possibly Freedom of Movement, as well as first round topics such as Kosovo's customs seal, air traffic and Kosovo's participation in regional initiatives. On 28 March, the representative discussed land books and registries of births, deaths and marriages, as well as power supply issues. Stefanović stated that "Certain progress has been achieved on land books, birth registries and electric energy supply; we laid out our proposal and hope that there will finally be a positive wrap-up of these topics at the next meeting".

=== Third round ===
The third round of dialogue took place on 15 April 2011. The issues discussed were freedom of movement, registration plates for vehicles and the recognition of educational diplomas.

=== Fourth round ===
The fourth round of dialogue was held on 17 and 18 May 2011. Agreement was almost reached on the cadaster and freedom of movement; the European Union proposed to also tackle the issues of missing people and cultural heritage.

=== Fifth round ===
The fifth round of dialogue was set to take place on 14 and 15 June 2011, but was delayed a few days before. It was assumed that the meeting would instead be held in late June, but it was pushed back to 2 July 2011. It was expected that solutions would be reached on the cadaster, freedom of movement and vital records. Electricity and telecommunications issues may also have been resolved in that round. Agreement was reached on freedom of movement across the border (both persons and cars), exchange of information regarding Serbia's civil registries to help Kosovo establish its own civil registry, and recognising each other's educational diplomas.

=== Sixth round ===
The sixth round of dialogue was set to take place on 20 and 21 July 2011. They were postponed to September on 19 July, allegedly because Kosovo's representative wanted to have Kosovo's state symbols shown, which the Serbian representative rejected. They were later set for 2 September 2011. Agreement was reached on the customs issue (the stamp will only feature the words "Customs of Kosovo") and on the cadaster; telecommunications and university degrees were also discussed, but no agreement was reached on these issues.

=== Seventh round ===
The seventh round dialogue was scheduled for 28 September 2011 (it was initially scheduled for 27 September, but was postponed shortly before due to a flare-up in violence). The Serb delegation refused to continue with the talks whilst Kosovo police and customs officials controlled border posts, which were not previously agreed upon, resulting in violence. The talks were then set for 14 October 2011, though only technical issues were planned to be discussed.

=== Outcome ===
- Kosovo representatives agreed on freedom of movement across the administrative border, both for persons and cars.
- Belgrade has agreed to give Pristina copies of land registries and documents on births, deaths and marriages in Kosovo.
- Mutual recognition of each other's university diplomas.
- Belgrade has agreed to accept Kosovo Customs stamps stating "Customs of Kosovo".
- End of the trade embargo, restoring trade between the two entities.
- Integrated operations at North Kosovo crossing points.
- Representation of Pristina authorities at regional organizations. (Note: "Kosovo*" will be the only denomination to be used and the footnote to be applied to the asterisk will read: "This designation is without prejudice to positions on status, and is in line with UNSCR 1244 and the ICJ Opinion on the Kosovo Declaration of Independence". Until now agreements have been signed by UNMIK.)
- Liaison officers would be exchanged between Belgrade and Pristina – to be stationed in EU missions.

=== Further aims ===
Additional agreements:

- energy cooperation issues – electricity transmission, implementation of the Energy Community treaty
- telecommunications issues – landline and mobile phone services in North Kosovo, roaming

== 2013 Brussels Agreement ==
The first stage of the dialogues 2011-2012 were referred to as the 'Technical Dialogue' and led to a significant number of technical agreements addressing the most pressing issues of concern, though most were never fully implemented.

The second phase, which began in 2013, is referred to as the 'High Level Dialogue', with the "First Agreement of Principles Governing the Normalisation of Relations", signed on 19 April 2013, as its crowning achievement. After the signing of the agreement, the European Commission officially advised that work could start on a Stabilisation and Association Agreement (SAA) with Kosovo and accession negotiations with Serbia.

In July 2017, the EU facilitated dialogue moved to pursuing comprehensive normalization of relations between Kosovo and Serbia.

In its 2018 strategy 'A credible enlargement perspective for and enhanced EU engagement with the Western Balkans', the European Commission wrote that, without effective and comprehensive normalization of Belgrade-Pristina relations through the EU-facilitated dialogue, there cannot be lasting stability in the region. A comprehensive, legally binding normalization agreement is urgent and crucial so that Serbia and Kosovo can advance on their respective European paths.

The lack of stability is clear due to the lack of consensus as well as an increase in violent developments. On 16 January 2018, Kosovo Serb politician, Oliver Ivanović, was assassinated in North Mitrovica and on 26 March 2018, the former Director of Serbia’s Kosovo office Marko Đurić was arrested and deported after illegally entering Kosovo and attending a meeting in North Mitrovica.

From 2018 until July 2020, talks between Serbia and Kosovo halted. The negotiations ceased due to the increasing violence, particularly the expulsion of Marko Ðurić as well as the introduction of a 100% tariff on imported goods from Serbia and Bosnia-Herzegovina by Kosovo government. Despite the stall in negotiations, the European Union continues to support open dialogue between Kosovo and Serbia.

=== September 2020 talks ===
In July 2020, attempts were made to revitalize the negotiations by the EU. However, progress was made at the Kosovo and Serbia economic normalization agreements in Washington, D.C., on 4 September 2020. While not a legally binding document, the international document provided a declaration of will and political commitment by both Kosovo and Serbia.

On 7 September 2020, Serbian President Aleksandar Vučić and Kosovo Prime Minister Avdullah Hoti met for talks in Brussels, hosted by Josep Borrell under the auspices of the European Union. At a press conference after the talks, EU Special Representative for the Serbia-Kosovo dialogue Miroslav Lajčák stated that "full progress" had been made in the areas of economic cooperation, missing persons and displaced people. Vučić and Hoti met again in Brussels on 28 September 2020 where they discussed arrangements for minority communities, the settlement of mutual financial claims and property and attempted to make progress towards a more comprehensive agreement.

== 2020 Washington Agreement ==
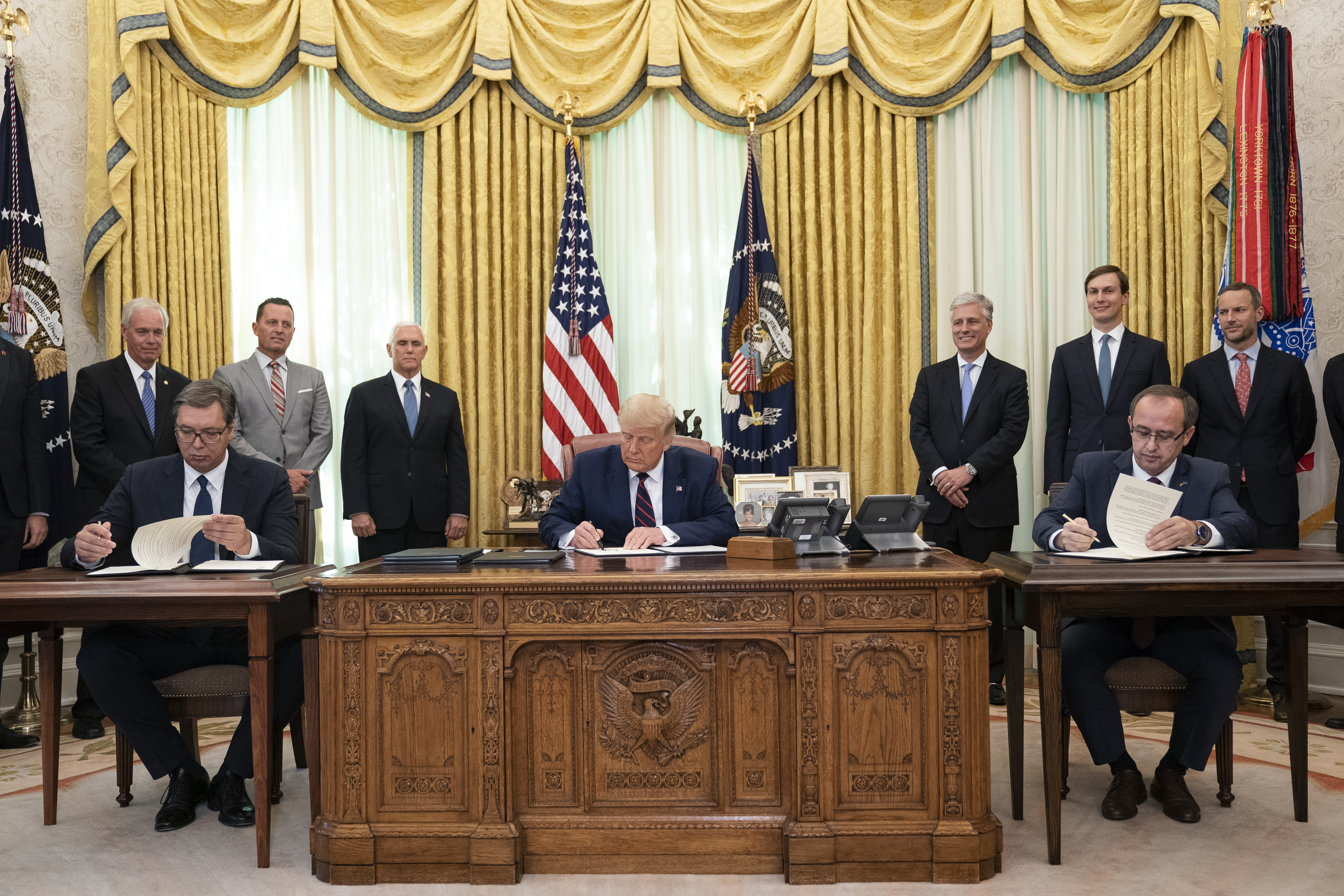
Aleksandar Vučić, President of Serbia (left), Donald Trump, President of the United States (middle), and Avdullah Hoti, Prime Minister of Kosovo (right), signing the agreement in the White House, 2020

On 4 September 2020, under a deal brokered by the United States, Serbia and Kosovo agreed to normalise economic relations. The deal will encompass freer transit, including by rail and road, while both parties agreed to work with the Export–Import Bank of the United States and the U.S. International Development Finance Corporation and to join the Mini Schengen Zone, but also to commence rail links between them such as Niš-Pristina and Pristina-Merdare and to connect the Belgrade-Pristina rail network with a deep seaport on the coast of the Adriatic Sea They will also conduct a feasibility study with the U.S. Department of Energy concerning the shared Gazivoda Lake, which straddles the border between the two states.

== 2023 Ohrid Agreement ==
In December 2022, the European Union forwarded a draft agreement to the authorities in Serbia and Kosovo at the EU-Western Balkans summit in Tirana. The proposed agreement is based on a previous draft drawn up by the French and German diplomats earlier in 2022. Under the terms of the draft agreement, both sides would agree to "develop normal, good neighborly relations with each other on the basis of equal right" and that "both parties will recognize each other's relevant documents and national symbols, including passports, diplomas, vehicle plates and customs stamps." The draft agreement further adds that Serbia will not oppose membership of Kosovo in any international organizations and Kosovo will form an "appropriate level of self-management for the Serbian community in Kosovo. Both parties will exchange permanent missions in their respective capitals. The proposal also allows for the formation of a joint commission, chaired by the EU, for monitoring its implementation. The EU hopes that the agreement could be signed by the end of 2023 and negotiations regarding the proposed agreement are expected begin in mid-January.

The final text, known as "Agreement on the path to normalization between Kosovo and Serbia", was reported to have been agreed in principle by Kosovan prime minister Albin Kurti and Serbian president Aleksandar Vučić on 27 February 2023 at a meeting in Brussels with EU High Representative for Foreign Affairs and Security Policy Josep Borrell and EU Special Representative for the Belgrade-Pristina Dialogue Miroslav Lajčák. Kurti and Vučić met again on 18 March at Ohrid, North Macedonia and verbally accepted a roadmap for implementation of the agreement.

== International reaction ==
- Albania Then Albanian Prime Minister Sali Berisha stated that he supports the "technical talks".
- Austria Foreign Minister Michael Spindelegger said that he believes the start of the talks between Belgrade and Pristina was good and yielded results despite a dose of restraint. He also welcomed the progress made in the talks, but stressed that normal relations between Serbia and Kosovo were still far away.
- Croatia On 28 March 2011, Gordan Jandroković, the Croatian Minister for Foreign Affairs and European Integration, stated "We support technical dialogue between the two states of Kosovo and Serbia, as two independent states. On this question, Croatia can serve as a model for regional cooperation, resolving technical issues between regional states".
- European Union EU Mediator Robert Cooper stated "The atmosphere was good. This was the first official meeting held in the last few years. The atmosphere was really good, friendly and sincere".
- France French President Nicolas Sarkozy said that Kosovo has progressed since declaring independence in 2008. However, he said that Kosovo needs more reform and that reform is the objective of the dialogue with Belgrade.
- Kosovo On 10 March 2011, the Kosovo Assembly passed a resolution (63 for and 57 against) in support of negotiations between the Republic of Kosovo and the Republic of Serbia. The resolution states that the negotiations should deal with "technical issues of common interest" and "can in no case involve the sovereignty ... and territorial integrity of Kosovo".
- Serbia On 9 March 2011, Serbian Minister for Kosovo Goran Bogdanović stated that the negotiations were "an opportunity to get to a historic compromise and historic reconciliation because the problems in the relations between Serbs and Albanians have already been there over the past few centuries" however "we will never recognise Kosovo as an independent creation, and it is good that these discussions have not been given a fixed term and that participants in the talks will not go to Brussels with ready-made solutions". Borko Stefanović stated that Belgrade wants to discuss the status of Kosovo during the negotiations however Pristina is strongly opposed to negotiating on status and says that status is not up for negotiating. Stefanović rejected the claim that these were only 'technical negotiations', he states that "some issues only appear technical, but have a strong political dimension. Pristina's continued insistence on independence is nothing but self-encouragement".
- United States U.S. Ambassador to Serbia Mary Burce Warlick stated "We hope that this will be a positive and constructive process which will lead to betterment of everyday life of people in both countries. We strongly support the talks, and both teams have opened the dialogue well."

== See also ==
- Accession of Kosovo to the European Union
- Accession of Serbia to the European Union
- Kosovo–Serbia relations
- 2008 Kosovo declaration of independence
- Foreign relations of Kosovo
- Foreign relations of Serbia
- International recognition of Kosovo
- Political status of Kosovo
