= Dušan Proroković =

Serbian political scientist

Dušan Proroković Душан Пророковић
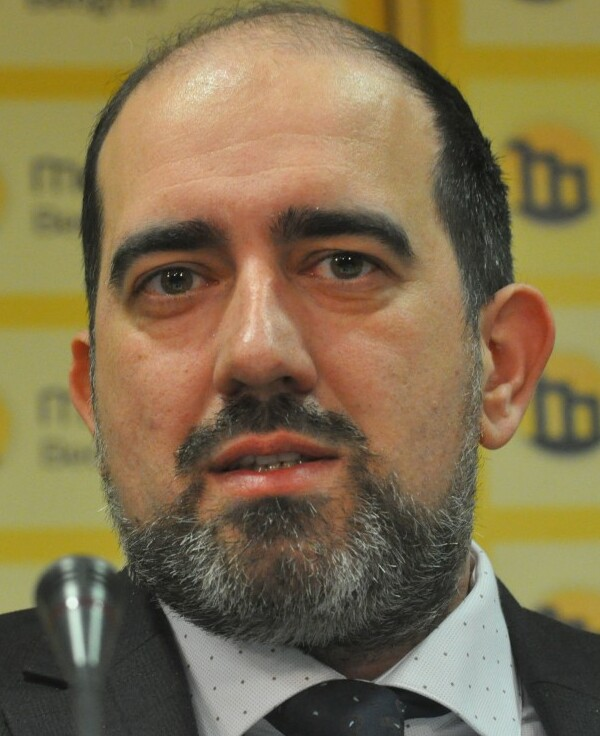
- Proroković in 2019

State Secretary in the Ministry for Kosovo and Metohija
- In office 24 May 2007 – 12 July 2008
- Prime Minister: Vojislav Koštunica
- Minister: Slobodan Samardžić

Member of the National Assembly
- In office 22 January 2001 – 25 May 2007

Personal details
- Born: 16 August 1976 (age 50) Loznica, SR Serbia, SFR Yugoslavia
- Party: DSS (1994–2017); Independent (2017–present)
- Children: 4
- Education: University of Belgrade; College of International and Public Relations Prague; Matej Bel University
- Occupation: Political scientist; professor; politician

Dušan Proroković (Serbian Cyrillic: Душан Пророковић; born 16 August 1976) is a Serbian political scientist, university professor and politician. A former member of the National Assembly from 2001 to 2007 and high-ranking official of the centre-right Democratic Party of Serbia (DSS), he is now affiliated with the far-right Serbian Party Oathkeepers (SSZ).

== Early life and education ==
Proroković was born on 16 August 1976 in Loznica, SR Serbia, SFR Yugoslavia.

He completed his undergraduate studies at the Faculty of Organizational Sciences (FON) of the University of Belgrade and postgraduate studies at the College of International and Public Relations Prague at the department of international relations and diplomacy, where he then received his master's degree. He obtained his Ph.D. degree at the department of international relations and diplomacy at the Faculty of Political Sciences and International Relations of the Matej Bel University in Banská Bystrica, and after completing his doctoral studies, he defended his doctoral dissertation at the Faculty of Security of the University of Belgrade.

== Academic career ==
He was appointed associate professor at the Faculty of Diplomacy and Security in Belgrade in 2018.

He also works as a research associate at the Belgrade Institute for International Politics and Economy, where he is the head of the Center for Eurasian Studies, executive director of the Center for Strategic Alternatives from Belgrade and foreign policy commentator of Radio Sputnik.

== Political career ==
He started his political career in 1994 as a member of Vojislav Koštunica's centre-right Democratic Party of Serbia (DSS), becoming a high-ranking official. He served as a member of the National Assembly from 2001 to 2007, when he was appointed a state secretary in the Ministry for Kosovo and Metohija and served until 2008 He was a substitute member of the Serbian delegation in the Parliamentary Assembly of the Council of Europe from 2006 to 2007. He was participating in the process of negotiations on the future status of Kosovo under the auspices of the UN. In 2007, Proroković stated that Serbia is ready to use force to maintain its sovereignty. Proroković was later appointed the president of the political council DSS. He was kicked out of the party in 2017 by its new leader Miloš Jovanović. He later became a political adviser to the far-right Serbian Party Oathkeepers (SSZ) and participated in its campaign for the 2022 general election.

== Political positions ==
=== Kosovo ===
Prokorović is against the recognition of independence of Kosovo, adding that Kosovo is a "NATO protectorate that unilaterally declared independence on the territory of Serbia" and that "that protectorate is institutionally unbuilt and systemically unsettled, and therefore 'stuck' with a handful of problems in the long run". In late January 2023, Prokorović signed a petition rejecting the proposed French-German agreement between Serbia and Kosovo. On 11 February 2023 in Kragujevac, Proroković, along with the leaders of SSZ, NDSS, Dveri and POKS, held the first joint campaign event as part of the campaign against the proposed French-German plan for Kosovo.

=== Foreign policy ===
Prokorović is a critic of NATO and in 2015 stated that by joining NATO, Serbia would "sacrifice a lot of things, and for that it would not receive any compensation". He believes that the Open Balkan initiative was a way to prevent further strengthening of economic ties between Belgrade and Moscow. In 2017, Prokorović wrote an article praising Aleksandr Dugin. In April 2022, Proroković signed a petition calling for Serbia not to impose sanctions on Russia after it invaded Ukraine.

== Personal life ==
Proroković is married and has four children. Besides his native Serbian, he speaks English, Czech, Slovak and Russian.

== Works ==
- Kosovo: Interethnic and Political Relations (2011)
- Geopolitics of Serbia: Position and Perspectives at the Beginning of the 21st Century (2012)
- German Geopolitics and Balkans: Goals of Middle European Continentalism (2014)
- The Era of Multipolarity (2017)
