= Oliver Ivanović =

Kosovo Serb politician

Oliver Ivanović Оливер Ивановић
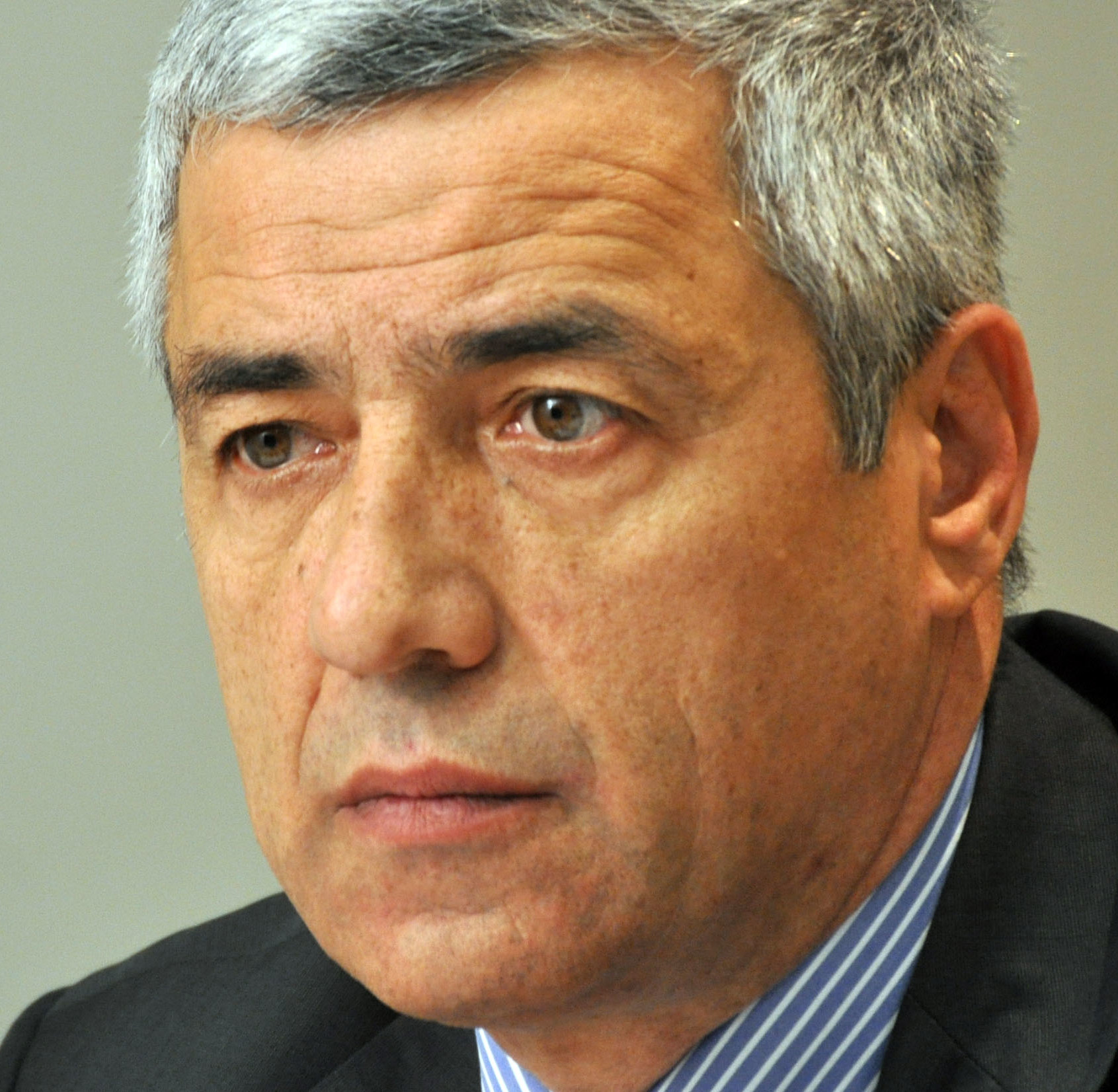
- Ivanović in December 2011

State Secretary of the Ministry for Kosovo and Metohija
- In office 2008–2012

Personal details
- Born: 1 April 1953 Rznić, AP Kosovo, PR Serbia, FPR Yugoslavia
- Died: 16 January 2018 (aged 64) North Mitrovica, Kosovo
- Cause of death: Assassination
- Resting place: Belgrade New Cemetery, Belgrade, Serbia
- Party: SKJ (1971–1990); SPS (1990–1999); DA (2001–2004); SDP (2004–2010); GI SDP (2010–2018)
- Spouse: Marina Ivanović
- Domestic partner: Milena Popović
- Children: 5
- Education: University of Priština
- Occupation: Politician
- Profession: Mechanical engineer, economist

Oliver Ivanović (Serbian Cyrillic: Оливер Ивановић; 1 April 1953 – 16 January 2018) was a Kosovo Serb politician.

Ivanović served as the State Secretary of the Ministry for Kosovo and Metohija from 2008 to 2012 and was also a member of the Coordination Center for Kosovo and Metohija from 2001 to 2008. He was assassinated by unknown perpetrators on 16 January 2018 in North Mitrovica.

== Early life and career ==
Ivanović was born in Rznić, a village near Dečani in the west of SAP Kosovo, FPR Yugoslavia (now Kosovo), on 1 April 1953. His father, Bogdan, was a history professor, and his mother, Olga, was a professor of Serbian language and literature. He also had a brother, Miroslav, and a sister, Nataša. His paternal heritage was Montenegrin. He attended primary and secondary mechanical-technical school in Kosovska Mitrovica. After turning 18, he joined the League of Communists of Yugoslavia in 1971.

Ivanović enrolled in the Zagreb Military Academy to become a pilot. During his studies he started karate training and quickly became an instructor. He earned a blackbelt and later won the Kosovo karate championship, became the President of the Karate Club in Trepča and judged in international competitions. Three years into his studies he was diagnosed with a color vision deficiency and left the Military Academy. He returned to Kosovo and graduated from the Faculty of Mechanical Engineering in Kosovska Mitrovica, University of Pristina. He also studied at the Faculty of Economics in Pristina.

After the studies, he worked in several companies in Mitrovica. With the creation of multi-party system in SFR Yugoslavia in 1990, he stepped out of parties, declaring himself "a man of the people". From 1991 to 1998, he was the head of the Sports Center in Mitrovica. Prior to the Kosovo War and the establishment of UNMIK in Kosovo, Ivanović was a lesser-known member of the Socialist Party of Serbia in Mitrovica.

== Political career ==
=== 1999–2008: Leader of Kosovo Serbs ===
1999–2004

With the establishment of the Serbian National Council of Kosovo and Metohija in 1999, he was appointed as the president of the executive board for North Kosovo. He was removed from this position on 6 June 2001. He was also removed from the presidential function of the Regional Board of Serbian National Council in October 2001.

Also, from 1998 to 2004, he served as the general director of nickel mine company "Feronikl" located in Drenas.

Ivanović joined the Democratic Alternative led by Nebojša Čović. On 2 August 2001, he became the Head of the Department for Economic Development and Reconstruction of the "Coordination Center for Kosovo and Metohija", while the Head of the Center was Nebojša Čović.

Ivanović led the Coalition "Return" in the 2001 Kosovan parliamentary election held in November 2001, getting 89,388 votes which earned 22 places in the Assembly of Kosovo (120 places in total) for his coalition.

He was appointed as the minister in the newly formed Government of Kosovo and a member of the Presidency of the Assembly of Kosovo on 2 December 2001. In March 2004, a violent unrest in Kosovo broke out, in which Kosovo Albanians took part in wide-ranging attacks on the Kosovo Serbs minority. The Government of Kosovo consisted of Serbian representatives fell soon after.

2004–2008

In 2004, Ivanović's party Democratic Alternative (DA) merged into the Social Democratic Party (SDP), and he together with Nebojša Čović became one of the party's leaders.

Also, in the same year he became the director of the National Employment Service for Kosovo and Metohija controlled by the Government of Serbia.

He was the leader of the Serbian List for Kosovo and Metohija in the 2004 Kosovan parliamentary election held in October 2004. The election was massively boycotted by Kosovo Serbs. Eventually, the list won 1,414 votes, thus taking 8 out of 10 Serbian minority places in the Assembly of Kosovo (110 places in total).

=== 2008–2012: Governmental position ===
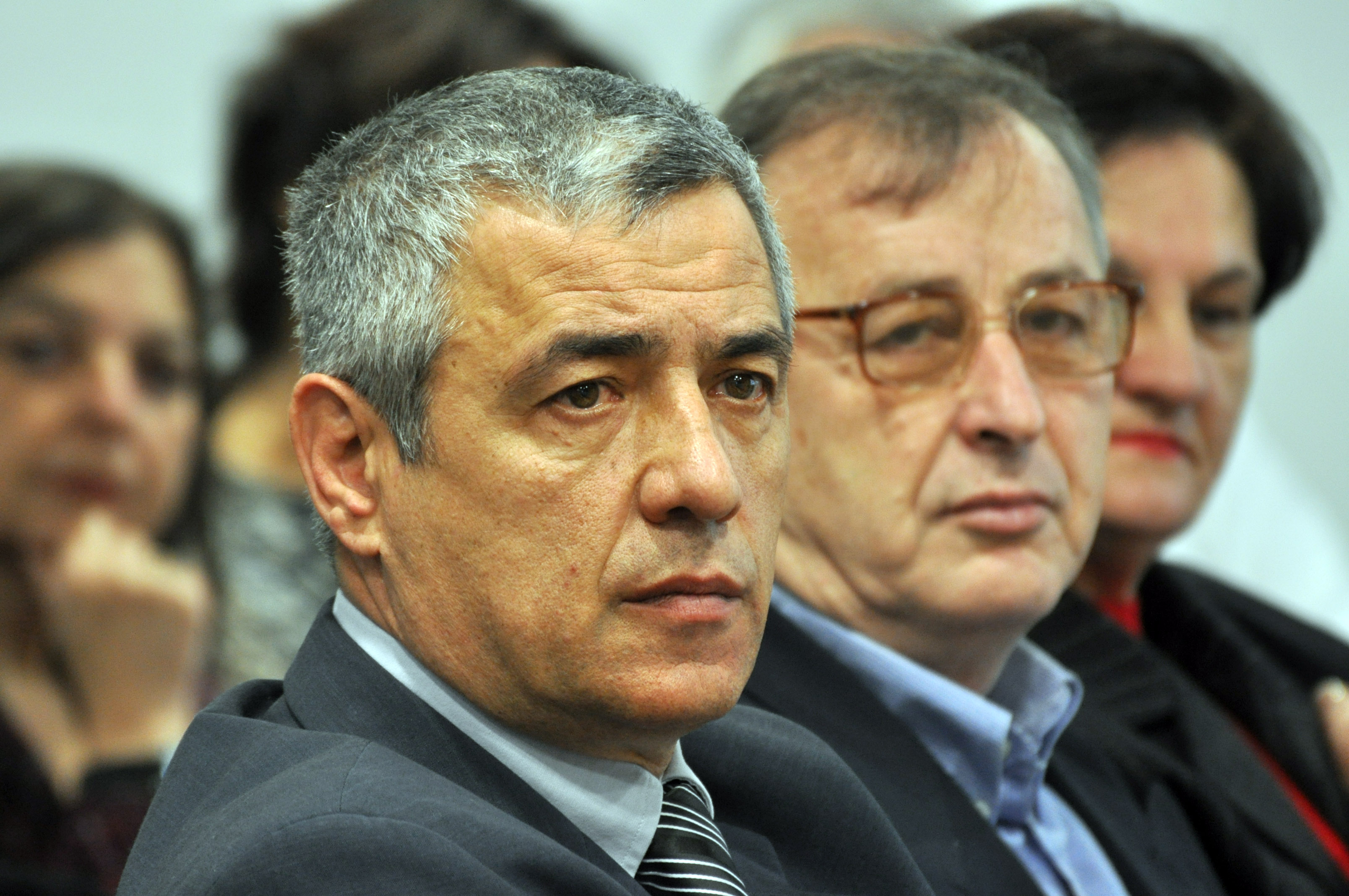
Ivanović in 2011 in Belgrade

On 17 February 2008, Kosovo unilaterally declared independence from Serbia in the Assembly of Kosovo. In a meeting attended by 109 of the total 120 MPs, the assembly unanimously declared Kosovo's independence, while all 11 representatives of the Kosovo Serbs minority boycotted the proceedings.

In July 2008, Ivanović joined the Government of Serbia as the State Secretary of the newly formed Ministry for Kosovo and Metohija under Minister Goran Bogdanović. The Ministry took over jurisdictions of disbanded "Coordination Center for Kosovo and Metohija".

In January 2010, the Social Democratic Party ceased to exist, which resulted in an exchange of bitter words between Ivanović and Čović. Soon after, he formed a civic initiative "Srbija, demokratija, pravda" (Eng. "Serbia, democracy, justice"). Since then, he served as president of the civic initiative.

He stayed on the position of the State Secretary until July 2012.

In July 2012, following the 2012 Serbian parliamentary election, the Serbian Progressive Party led by Aleksandar Vučić and Socialist Party of Serbia led by Ivica Dačić formed the Government of Serbia.

=== 2013–2018: Political decline ===
In April 2013, the Government of Serbia and the Government of Kosovo signed the Brussels Agreement on the normalization of their relations.

2013 Local elections

In September 2013, Ivanović announced that his civic initiative was forced to change its name from "SDP" - "Srbija, demokratija, pravda" (Eng. "Serbia, democracy, justice"),
to "GI SDP - Oliver Ivanovic", following the request of the Central Election Commission of Kosovo, which banned the use of the other countries' name for names of political organizations operating in Kosovo.

Ivanović decided to run in the 2013 Kosovan local elections for the president of North Mitrovica, with his civic initiative "SDP". The election campaign was marked with the Serbian Progressive Party-led Government of Serbia public calls to Kosovo Serbs to come out and vote in Kosovan elections organized by the Government of Kosovo, for the first time since Kosovo gained independence. The Government of Serbia also called the citizens to vote for the Serb List candidates.

Eventually, Ivanović lost to Krstimir Pantić of the civic initiative Serb List, finishing with 1,924 votes (45.62%).

2014–17 Imprisonment and threats

In January 2014, two months following the local elections, Ivanović was arrested on suspicion over war crimes which occurred in 1999 and 2000. He was sentenced to nine years in jail on 21 January 2016 for war crimes by judges from the EULEX Kosovo. However, the Appeals Court in Pristina annulled the guilty verdict on 12 February 2017 and ordered a new trial. The case was dropped after his assassination. In 2021, Malcolm Simmons, former head judge at the EU’s rule-of-law mission in Kosovo, told Kosovo MPs that he was pressured by EULEX to bring a case against Ivanović for political reasons so that he would not run for office.

In July 2017, his car was burned down by unknown perpetrators.

In September 2017, three months after the 2017 Kosovan parliamentary election, the Serb List with the support of the Serbian political leadership, formed the Government of Kosovo with PANA Coalition, which is formed of former Kosovo Liberation Army leaders (active in Kosovo War).

Ivanović was released from prison in early 2017 and at that time pointed out the poor circumstances in North Kosovo where Serbs formed the majority. In an interview, he stated that Kosovo Serbs in North Kosovo are not afraid of Kosovo Albanians, but rather of, "Serbs, local criminals who ride in SUVs without car plates". He also said that, "Drugs are sold on every corner and parents are very concerned." He pointed that in just a few years, there had been over 50 cases of burned vehicles, many hand grenades thrown, and two unresolved murders committed, and added that, "All this happened on a territory of just two and a half square kilometers, which happens to be completely covered by security cameras". He surmised that, "It was obvious that police forces are afraid to offend the perpetrators" and that, "Perpetrators likely come from security forces."

2017 Local elections

He decided to run in 2017 Kosovan local elections for the president of North Mitrovica, with his civic initiative "SDP". During the campaign, he publicly criticized the Government of Serbia and ruling Serbian Progressive Party for favoring Serb List over other Serbian parties in Kosovan local elections.

Goran Rakić, a leader of the Serb List and opponent in elections for North Mitrovica, labelled Ivanović as an "irrelevant person" in Kosovo politics. Also, prominent officials of the Government of Serbia among whom was the director of the Office for Kosovo and Metohija Marko Đurić, blatantly discredited Ivanović labeling him as "traitor" and anti-Serbian politician. Ivanović responded by saying: "I have proven my Serbian patriotism in a much more difficult way than those who are accusing me of being anti-Serbian, I hope, will have to prove theirs [Serbian patriotism].

Eventually, Ivanović finished in second place with 1,475 votes (18.52%), behind Goran Rakić who received 5,372 votes (67.45%). Also, the Serb List won in all 10 Serb-majority municipalities.

== Assassination ==
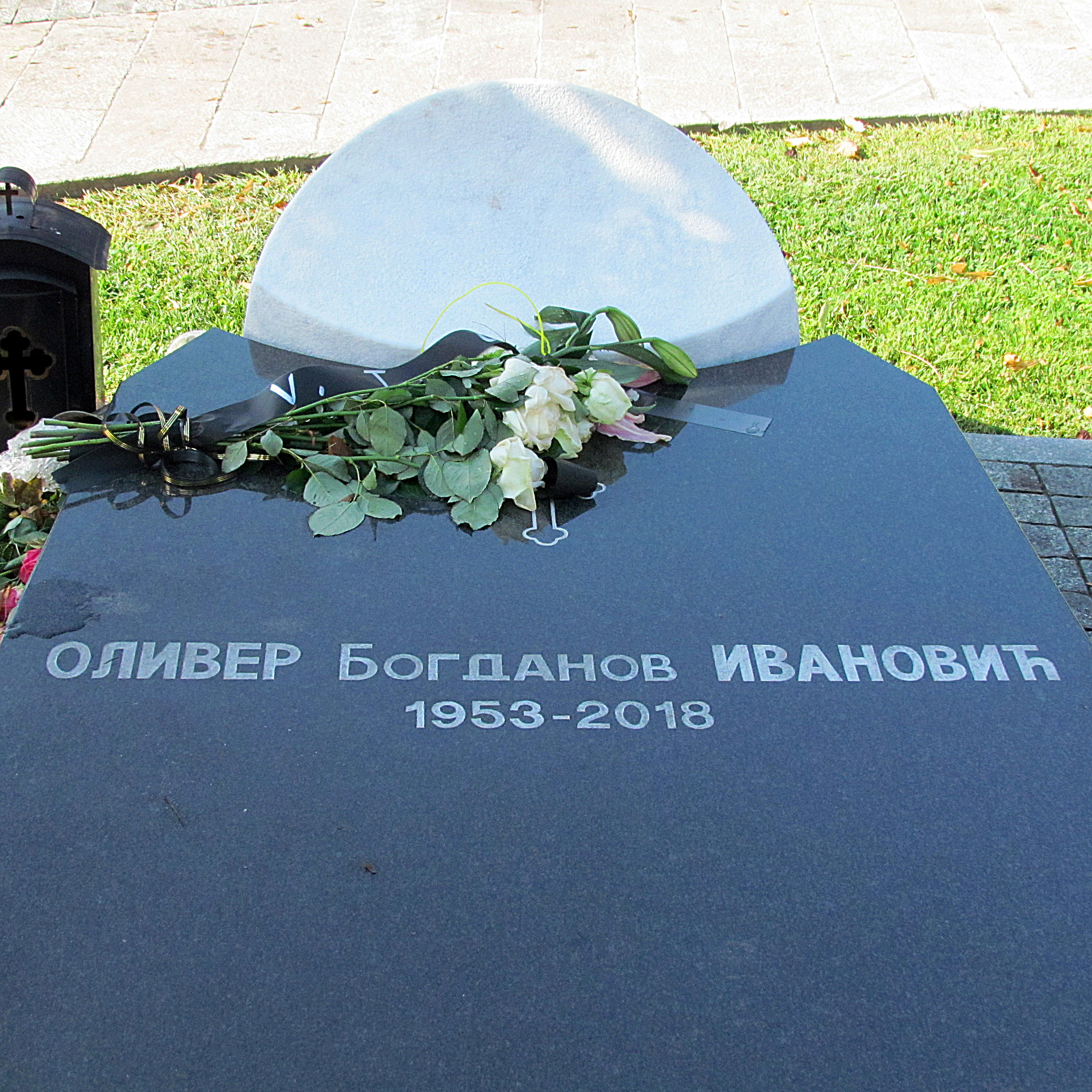
Ivanović's grave at the Belgrade New Cemetery

On 16 January 2018, Ivanović was shot in a drive-by shooting at 08:17 CET, while entering his office in North Mitrovica. Resuscitation attempts were performed at Mitrovica Hospital shortly afterwards up to 9:15, but they were unsuccessful.

Autopsy findings revealed that Ivanović had been hit by six 9mm PARA bullets from a Zastava M70A pistol, mainly hitting his upper torso (vital organs – upper aorta, hollow vein and liver). In an interview four days prior to the assassination, he had admitted that he feared for his safety.

Soon afterwards, President of Serbia Aleksandar Vučić scheduled an emergency session of the National Security Council of Serbia. He condemned the assassination, describing it as an "act of terror". The Government of Kosovo condemned the assassination as well. This was the first assassination of a Serbian politician since the murder of former Prime Minister of Serbia Zoran Đinđić fifteen years earlier, on 12 March 2003.

His funeral took place on Thursday January 18, in the New Cemetery of Belgrade.

== Investigation ==
=== Investigation in Kosovo ===
Kosovo police arrested four persons on 23 November 2018: three suspected towards involvement in the murder and one for obstruction to police work.

Silvana Arsović, Oliver Ivanović party's administrator, was detained for 48 hours on 26 November 2018 to be questioned under suspicion if she manipulated security cameras outside the party office in Mitrovica before the murder, when the murder took place near the office. Prosecutor Syle Hoxha said that Silvana Arsović was detained only for 48 hours.

Kosovo police officer Dragiša Marković was detained for 1 day on 10 February 2018 under suspicion of manipulating the evidences on the place of the murder of Oliver Ivanović. Then, he was arrested a second time on 23 November 2018.

Mario Milošević, a Montenegrin citizen, was arrested on 18 July 2018 in Pristina. (He was also on a warrant list by Interpol towards separate murder connected with organized crime in Podgorica.) On 23 November 2018, Kosovo police officer Nedeljko Spasojević was arrested along with Marko Rosić, a person associated by media with Partizan Belgrade fan club, in North Kosovo. Strahinja Danković was also arrested together with Mario Milošević. Montenegrin media call him a football fan of Serbian club FK Rad.

Milan Radoičić, a businessman and head of Kosovo Serb party ″Srpska Lista″, was on suspicion towards involvement in the murder, his home was raided by Kosovo Police on 23 November 2018, but he escaped arrest fleeing to Serbia. There in Serbia, Milan Radoičić was interviewed on 26 November 2018 by Serbian police, when he denied his any involvement in the case. Serbian president Aleksandar Vučić said that Milan Radoičić is innocent, and Kosovo police wanted to kill him during raid to put guilt of organizing the murder on Serbian government.

In April 2019, Kosovo prosecutor Syle Hoxha stated that two new suspects were being investigated for their possible involvement, both of whom were tied to organized crime. The suspects were not named.

In February 2020, a new trial began with six Serbs charged with the participation in the assassination of Ivanović. All of them pleaded not guilty of all charges at the preparatory hearing before the Special Court in Pristina. In June 2024, four individuals were convicted and sentenced to prison: Marko Rosić, Nedelko Spasojević, Dragisa Marković and Zarko Ivanović. Silvana Arsović was acquitted during the trial while another one of the suspects, Rade Basara, was also previously acquitted.

=== Investigation in Serbia ===
Nebojša Stefanović, Serbian Interior Minister, told in January 2019 that Serbia is leading its own investigation towards the murder tracing some persons who were in north Kosovo then moved to Western Europe. He didn't name the suspected. President of Serbia Aleksandar Vučić stated that German Albanian Fljorim Ejupi is the wanted assassin, which was negated by Kosovo.

== Personal life ==
Beside his native language Serbian, he also spoke Albanian, English and Italian.

He was in relationship with Milena Popović, with whom he had a son. He also had three sons by his previous marriage with Marina. He also had a daughter in a previous relationship.

== See also ==
- List of unsolved murders (2000–present)
