= Milena Popović =

Serbian politician

Milena Popović (Serbian Cyrillic: Милена Поповић; born 1983), formerly known as Milena Ivanović, is politician in Serbia. She is the widow of Oliver Ivanović, a prominent Kosovo Serb politician who was killed by unknown assailants in 2018. Popović is a member of the Serbian Progressive Party and was elected to the National Assembly of Serbia in the 2020 Serbian parliamentary election.

== Private career ==
Popović is an art historian living in Belgrade.

== Public career ==
Popović sometimes acted as a spokesperson for Ivanović during his incarceration in Priština between 2014 and 2017. She has spoken several times about his assassination, remarking on one occasion that she would not make a public statement on the identity of his killers unless she was absolutely certain.

Popović joined the Progressive Party in early 2020. This decision was met with surprise and criticism from some circles. Shortly before Oliver Ivanović's assassination, a television station associated with the Progressive Party and the Serb List ran a video directed against Ivanović, accusing him of working against the interests of Serbs. This occurred during the 2017 Kosovan local elections, when Ivanović was leading the only organized political opposition in the local Serb community. Popović has downplayed the significance of the video, describing it as short-term criticism in the context of a political campaign. She had previously said in a 2019 interview that Progressive Party member Marko Đurić, for many years the director of Serbia's Office for Kosovo and Metohija, did more to assist her husband during his incarceration than anyone else. She added that she acted as a conduit between Ivanović and Đurić when relations between the two were strained and that she considered Đurić to be a friend.

=== Parliamentarian ===
Popović received the fifty-fifth position on the party's Aleksandar Vučić — For Our Children electoral list in the 2020 parliamentary election and was elected when the list won a landslide victory with 188 out of 250 mandates. She is a member of the culture and information committee and the committee on constitutional and legislative issues, a deputy member of the health and family committee, and a member of the parliamentary friendship groups with Belgium, Germany, and Italy.

In October 2020, Popović accused opposition politicians of using the murder of Oliver Ivanović to score political points.
