= Serbia–Uzbekistan relations =

- Serbia: Uzbekistan

Serbia and Uzbekistan maintain diplomatic relations established between Uzbekistan and the Federal Republic of Yugoslavia (of which Serbia is considered sole legal successor) in 1995.

== History ==
On 29 October 2025, President of Serbia, Aleksandar Vučić, travelled to Tashkent. The two nations signed a joint declaration. Vučić stated "I hope that in the future we will conclude a free trade agreement, an investment protection agreement, and further strengthen economic and trade cooperation." Vučić also commended Uzbekistan for not recognizing the independence of Kosovo.

On 6 May 2026, Marko Đurić, Serbian minister of foreign affairs, met with Uzbek president Shavkat Mirziyoyev and Uzbek foreign minister, Bakhtiyor Saidov. The two nations discussed labor migration, culture, and education.

=== Uzbekistan's stance on Kosovo ===
Uzbekistan does not recognize Kosovo, as Uzbekistan has maintained its stance with Serbia on the issue, respecting Serbia's territorial integrity and sovereignty.

== High-level visits ==
High level visits from Serbia to Uzbekistan

- Aleksandar Vučić (29 October 2025)
- Marko Đurić (6 May 2026)

High level visits from Uzbekistan to Serbia

== Economic relations ==
In 2025, both nations traded for $44 million (€37.7 million), with $27.5 million (€23.6 million) going from Serbia to Uzbekistan, and $16.4 million (€14.1 million) going from Uzbekistan to Serbia.

== Diplomatic missions ==
- Serbia is represented in Uzbekistan through its embassy in Moscow (Russia).
- Uzbekistan is represented in Serbia through its embassy in Vienna (Austria).

== See also ==
- Foreign relations of Serbia
- Foreign relations of Uzbekistan
