= Vladimir Petrović (disambiguation) =

Vladimir Petrović (born 1955) is a Serbian football manager and former player.

Vladimir Petrović may also refer to:

- Vladimir Petrović (ambassador) (born 1978), former Serbian ambassador to the United States
- Vladimir Petrović-Stergiou (born 1977), Serbian-Greek professional basketball player
- Vladimir Petrović (footballer, born 1972), former Croatian footballer
- Vladimir Petrović (tennis) (born 1929), former Yugoslavia Davis Cup tennis player
