= Goran Bogdanović =

Goran Bogdanović may refer to:

- Goran Bogdanović (politician) (born 1963), Serbian politician and former Minister for Kosovo and Metohija
- Goran Bogdanović (footballer) (born 1967), Serbian footballer
- Goran Bogdanović (footballer, born 1990), former Macedonia U21 international footballer
