= Petar Petković =

Serbian politician

- Петар Петковић
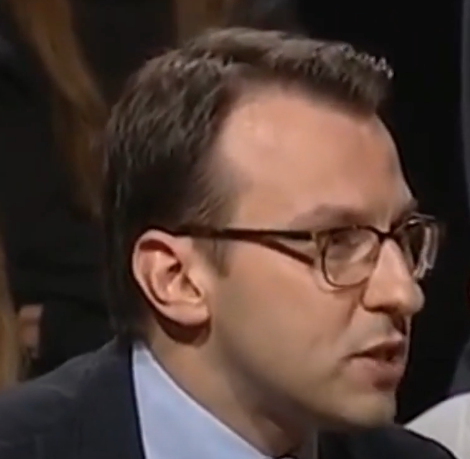

Director of the Office for Kosovo
- Incumbent
- Assumed office 8 October 2020
- President: Aleksandar Vučić
- Preceded by: Marko Đurić

Personal details
- Born: 12 July 1980 (age 46) Zaječar, SR Serbia, SFR Yugoslavia
- Party: Serbian Progressive Party; Democratic Party of Serbia (until 2014)
- Children: 2
- Education: University of Belgrade

Petar Petković (Serbian Cyrillic: Петар Петковић; born 12 July 1980) is a Serbian politician who is currently serving as the Director of the Office for Kosovo since 8 October 2020. Previously he served as the Assistant Director of the office and was a Member of the National Assembly. He was a member of the Democratic Party of Serbia (DSS) until he joined the Serbian Progressive Party (SNS).

== Biography ==
=== Early life and education ===
He was born in 1980 near the Bulgarian border in Zaječar, Serbia that was during that time a constituent republic of Yugoslavia .

He graduated from the Faculty of Orthodox Theology of the University of Belgrade and the Diplomatic Academy of the Ministry of Foreign Affairs of Serbia. He did his postgraduate studies at the Faculty of Political Sciences in Belgrade at the Department of International Studies and received a masters degree.

=== Political career ===
Petković served as an advisor in the Cabinet of the Prime Minister of Serbia Vojislav Koštunica from 2007 to 2008.

After the 2012 parliamentary elections, he was elected an MP on the list of the Democratic Party of Serbia.

In October 2014, Petković left the DSS only a day after its founder and longtime leader Vojislav Koštunica left the party. In the meantime, he joined the Serbian Progressive Party and became a member of the party's Main Board.

He has been the Assistant Director of the Office for Kosovo and Metohija from April 2016 to October 2020 when he took over as the Director replacing Marko Đurić who was named the new Ambassador of Serbia to the United States of America. On 8 December 2022, during the North Kosovo crisis, Petković stated that Serbia could respond by sending up to 1,000 security force personnel to Kosovo in accordance with the UN Resolution 1244.

=== Personal life ===
Petković speaks English and can use Russian. He is married to his wife Nadica, and is the father of two children.

== See also ==
- Kosovo and Metohija
- Republic of Kosovo

Government offices
Preceded by Marko Đurić	Director of the Office for Kosovo and Metohija; 2020–present	Incumbent
