= List of ambassadors of Serbia to the United States =

List of Serbian ambassadors to the United States

Coordinates: 38.919936°N 77.070801°W

Ambassador of Serbia to the United States
- Амбасадор Србије у Сједињеним Државама
- Greater coat of arms of Serbia

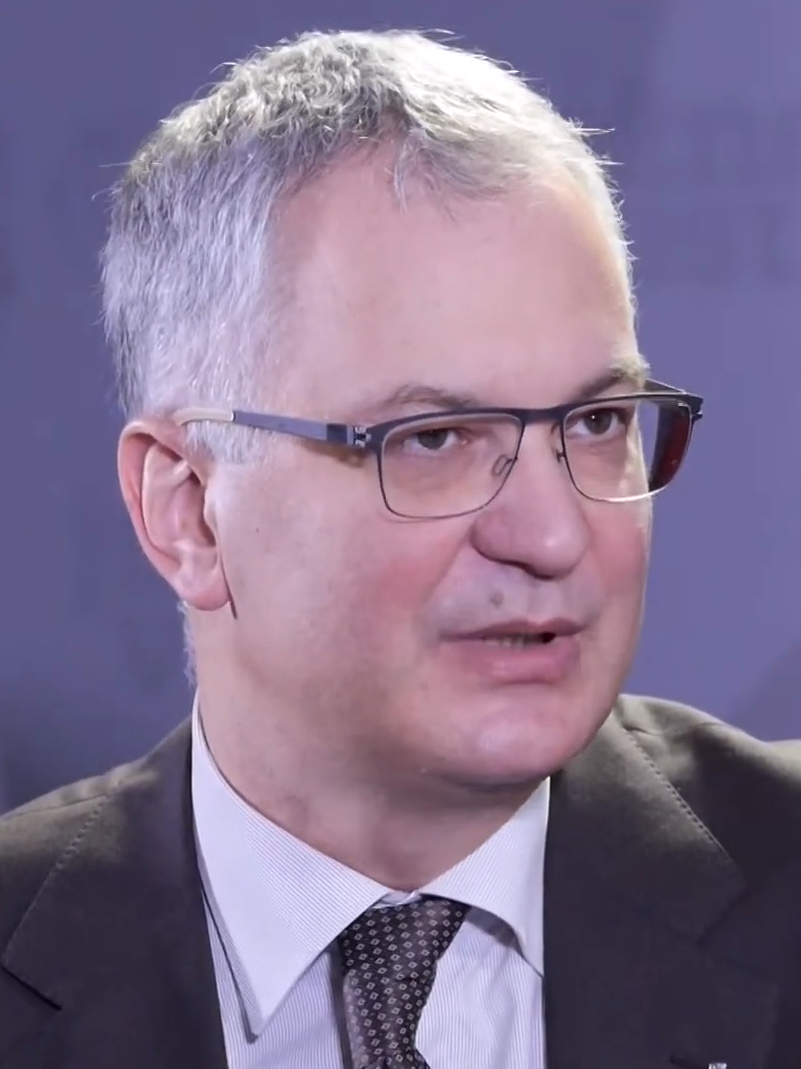
- Incumbent; Dragan Šutanovac since May 9, 2024
- Ministry of Foreign Affairs
- Style: His Excellency
- Residence: Washington, D.C.
- Nominator: Government
- Appointer: President of the Republic
- Inaugural holder: Ljubomir Mihajlović
- Formation: 1917

The Ambassador of Serbia to the United States is the official diplomatic representative of the Republic of Serbia to the United States. The ambassador leads the Serbian diplomatic mission and is responsible for managing and strengthening the bilateral relations between the two countries.

The diplomatic mission was first established in 1917 during the Kingdom of Serbia period. The role has continued through various political transformations, including the Kingdom of Serbs, Croats, and Slovenes (later renamed to the Kingdom of Yugoslavia), the Federal People's Republic of Yugoslavia (later renamed to the Socialist Federal Republic of Yugoslavia), the Federal Republic of Yugoslavia (later renamed to the State Union of Serbia and Montenegro), and the modern Republic of Serbia.

Throughout the 20th century, the post evolved from envoys to fully accredited ambassadors, mirroring the development of modern diplomatic protocols. Notably, during the 1990s, diplomatic representation was limited or suspended due to interruptions in diplomatic relations between Serbia and the United States at the time.

== List of representatives ==
Designated	Diplomatic accreditation	Image	Officeholder	Title	Heads of state Serbia/Yugoslavia/ Serbia–Montenegro	President of the United States
January 26, 1917 – legation opened; listed as the Kingdom of Serbia
January 26, 1917			Ljubomir Mihailović	Envoy	Peter I of Serbia	Woodrow Wilson
August 21, 1918			Jevrem Simić	Chargé d'affaires	Peter I of Serbs, Croats, and Slovenes	Woodrow Wilson
January 6, 1919			Slavko Grujić	Envoy	Peter I of Serbs, Croats, and Slovenes	Woodrow Wilson
February 1, 1919 – listed as the Kingdom of Serbs, Croats, and Slovenes
October 10, 1922			Ante Tresić Pavičić	Envoy	Alexander I of Serbs, Croats, and Slovenes	Warren G. Harding
May 4, 1927			Vojislav Antonijević	Envoy	Alexander I of Serbs, Croats, and Slovenes	Calvin Coolidge
June 10, 1928			Božidar Purić	Chargé d'affaires	Alexander I of Serbs, Croats, and Slovenes	Calvin Coolidge
May 24, 1929			Leonid Pitamic	Envoy	Alexander I of Serbs, Croats, and Slovenes	Herbert Hoover
October 1, 1929 – listed as the Kingdom of Yugoslavia
May 1, 1934			Božidar P. Stojanović	Chargé d'affaires	Peter II of Yugoslavia	Franklin D. Roosevelt
October 29, 1935			Konstantin Fotić	Envoy	Peter II of Yugoslavia	Franklin D. Roosevelt
October 5, 1942 – legation raised to embassy
October 5, 1942			Konstantin Fotić	Ambassador	Peter II of Yugoslavia	Franklin D. Roosevelt
July 10, 1944			Ivan Frangeš	Chargé d'affaires	Peter II of Yugoslavia	Franklin D. Roosevelt
April 24, 1945	May 2, 1945		Stanoje Simić	Ambassador	Ivan Ribar	Harry S. Truman
January 6, 1946			Sergije Makiedo	Chargé d'affaires	Ivan Ribar	Harry S. Truman
July 9, 1946	July 18, 1946		Sava Kosanović	Ambassador	Ivan Ribar	Harry S. Truman
July 1, 1947 – listed as the Federal People's Republic of Yugoslavia
May 22, 1950	June 5, 1950		Vladimir Popović	Ambassador	Ivan Ribar	Harry S. Truman
April 12, 1954	April 13, 1954		Leo Mates	Ambassador	Josip Broz Tito	Dwight D. Eisenhower
October 6, 1958	October 27, 1958		Marko Nikezić	Ambassador	Josip Broz Tito	Dwight D. Eisenhower
September 27, 1962	November 2, 1962		Veljko Mićunović	Ambassador	Josip Broz Tito	John F. Kennedy
April 7, 1963 – listed as the Socialist Federal Republic of Yugoslavia
August 28, 1967	August 30, 1967		Bogdan Crnobrnja	Ambassador	Josip Broz Tito	Lyndon B. Johnson
October 14, 1971	October 21, 1971		Toma Granfil	Ambassador	Josip Broz Tito	Richard Nixon
November 18, 1975	November 21, 1975		Dimče Belovski	Ambassador	Josip Broz Tito	Gerald Ford
October 19, 1979			Vladimir Sinđelić	Chargé d'affaires	Josip Broz Tito	Jimmy Carter
November 16, 1979	November 28, 1979		Budimir Lončar	Ambassador	Josip Broz Tito	Jimmy Carter
December 10, 1983			Branislav Novaković	Chargé d'affaires	Mika Špiljak	Ronald Reagan
December 28, 1983	January 9, 1984		Mićo Rakić	Ambassador	Mika Špiljak	Ronald Reagan
June 22, 1987	July 20, 1989		Živorad Kovačević	Ambassador	Lazar Mojsov	Ronald Reagan
November 22, 1989	December 20, 1989		Dževad Mujezinović	Ambassador	Janez Drnovšek	George H. W. Bush
May 21, 1992 – listed as Serbia–Montenegro
1992			Ivan Živković	Chargé d'affaires	Dobrica Ćosić	George H. W. Bush
1994			Dušan Paunović	Chargé d'affaires	Zoran Lilić	Bill Clinton
1994			Zoran Popović	Chargé d'affaires	Zoran Lilić	Bill Clinton
1996			Nebojša Vujović	Chargé d'affaires	Zoran Lilić	Bill Clinton
March 25, 1999-January 1, 2001 – embassy closed
January 1, 2001 – listed as the Federal Republic of Yugoslavia
January 18, 2001	February 14, 2001		Milan St. Protić	Ambassador	Vojislav Koštunica	George W. Bush
2001			Ivan Živković	Chargé d'affaires	Vojislav Koštunica	George W. Bush
October 30, 2002	December 9, 2002		Ivan Vujačić	Ambassador	Vojislav Koštunica	George W. Bush
February 4, 2003 – listed as the State Union of Serbia and Montenegro
June 6, 2006 – listed as the Republic of Serbia
April 14, 2009	May 20, 2009		Vladimir Petrović	Ambassador	Boris Tadić	Barack Obama
December 3, 2013			Vladimir Jovičić	Chargé d'affaires	Tomislav Nikolić	Barack Obama
February 2, 2015	February 23, 2015		Đerđ Matković	Ambassador	Tomislav Nikolić	Barack Obama
October 8, 2020			Marko Đurić	Ambassador	Aleksandar Vučić	Donald Trump
April 1, 2024			Vladimir Marić	Chargé d'affaires	Aleksandar Vučić	Donald Trump
May 9, 2025	July 28, 2025		Dragan Šutanovac	Ambassador	Aleksandar Vučić	Donald Trump

== See also ==
- Serbia–United States relations
- Foreign relations of Serbia
