= Robert Cooper (diplomat) =

British diplomat and adviser

Sir Robert Cooper
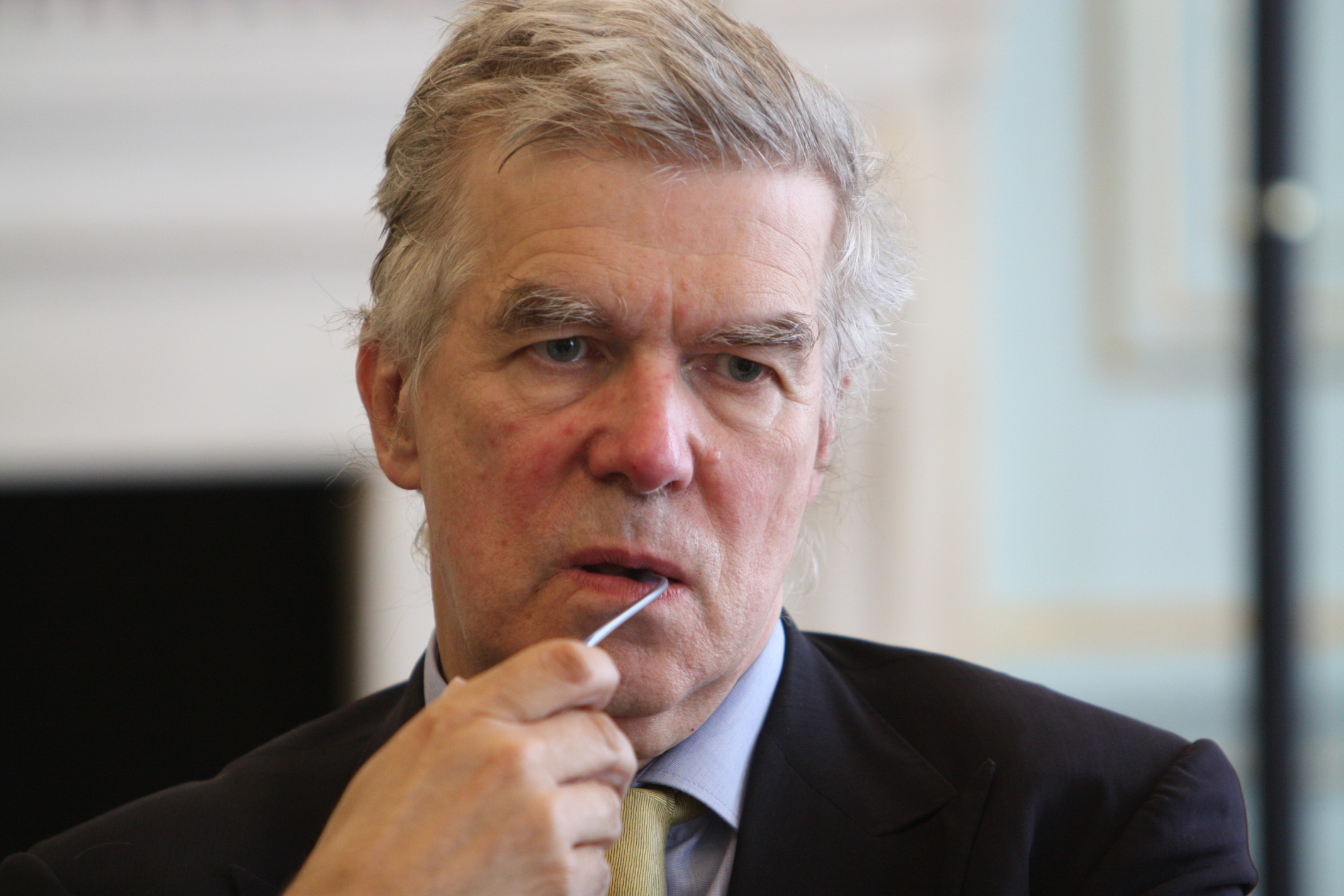

Special Adviser at the European Commission
- In office April 2013 – March 2014

EEAS Counsellor
- In office 2010–2013

DG for External and Politico-Military Affairs (Council of the European Union)
- In office 2002–2010

Personal details
- Born: 28 August 1947 (age 79) Brentwood, Essex, England, United Kingdom
- Domestic partner: Mitsuko Uchida
- Education: Worcester College, Oxford; University of Pennsylvania

Sir Robert Francis Cooper (born 28 August 1947) is a British diplomat and adviser who served as a Special Adviser at the European Commission for Myanmar between 2013 and 2014. He was also a member of the European Council on Foreign Relations and writes on international relations.

== Early life ==
He was born on 28 August 1947, in Brentwood, Essex, the son of Norman and Frances Cooper, and educated at the Delamere School for Boys in Nairobi, Kenya, and Worcester College, Oxford. He won a Thouron Award, and spent the academic year 1969–70 at the University of Pennsylvania, joining the Diplomatic Service of the Foreign and Commonwealth Office in 1970.

== Career ==
As a diplomat, he has worked at various British embassies abroad, notably those in Tokyo and Bonn. At the Foreign Office, he was Head of the Policy Planning Staff from 1989 to 1993. He has also been seconded to the Bank of England and spent a period in the Cabinet Office as Deputy Secretary for Defence and Overseas Affairs. He was the UK's Special Representative in Afghanistan until mid-2002.

In 2002, he began to work for the European Union (EU). He assumed the role of Director-General for External and Politico-Military Affairs at the General Secretariat of the Council of the European Union. In that role, he was responsible to Javier Solana, the former High Representative of the EU's Common Foreign and Security Policy, and has assisted with the implementation of European strategic, security and defence policy. Since 2007 he has also been a member of the European Council on Foreign Relations.

After the Treaty of Lisbon's shake-up of EU foreign policy structures, and Solana's replacement by Catherine Ashton, Cooper sat on the steering committee which drew up the proposals for the new European External Action Service (EEAS). After the EEAS, the EU's foreign service, was formally established in December 2010 Cooper was made an EEAS "Counsellor". Subsequently he was released from the EEAS, but appointed as a Special Adviser to the Vice-President of the European Commission Catherine Ashton, primarily with regard to Myanmar, from April 2013 to March 2014.

== Personal life ==
His longtime partner is Dame Mitsuko Uchida, a concert pianist.

== Controversy ==
In March 2011, Cooper apparently came under fire for his support of Bahraini government crackdowns against protesters, waving off suggestions of police violence and saying "accidents happen." His comments came a week after a video surfaced showing a Bahraini police convoy performing drive-by shootings against unarmed protesters.

== Honours and distinctions ==
Following the state visit to Japan by Queen Elizabeth II, he was appointed Member of the Royal Victorian Order. He was subsequently appointed Companion of the Order of St Michael and St George (CMG).

In 2004, Cooper was awarded the Orwell Prize for The Breaking of Nations.

In November 2005, he was listed among the top 100 in Prospect magazine's Global Intellectuals Poll.

On 14 November 2012, he was listed by EurActiv, the European media network, as the 28th out of 40 "most influential Britons on EU policy".

Cooper was appointed Knight Commander of the Order of St Michael and St George (KCMG) in the 2013 New Year Honours for services to international peace and security.

== Doctrine ==
Cooper is best known for his exposition of the doctrine of "new liberal imperialism", as expressed in his The Post-Modern State (2002). This contains such ideas as the designation of countries as "Failed states", "Modern states" and "Postmodern states", and statements such as "The challenge to the postmodern world is to get used to the idea of double standards". His world-view is said to have been influential in the political thinking of Tony Blair as well as the development of European Security and Defence Policy.

== Publications ==
His publications, apart from a number of articles in Prospect and elsewhere, include:

- The Post-Modern State and the World Order (Demos, 2000), ISBN 1841800104.
- The Post-Modern State, in Mark Leonard (ed.) Re-Ordering the World: The long-term implications of 11 September (Foreign Policy Centre: London, 2002) Observer Special Report Full text (pdf)
- The Breaking of Nations: Order and Chaos in the Twenty-First Century (Atlantic Press, 2003), ISBN 0-7710-2266-2.
- The Ambassadors: Thinking about Diplomacy from Machiavelli to Modern Times (Weidenfeld & Nicolson, 2021), ISBN 1-7802-2836-8.
