= College of International and Public Relations Prague =

Private university in Prague, Czech Republic

Coordinates: 50°4′4.7″N 14°23′57.25″E

The College of International and Public Relations Prague (in Czech: Vysoká škola mezinárodních a veřejných vztahů Praha) is a private university in Prague, specializing in bachelor's and master's degrees in international and public relations. Since 2008 has established the Education and Consulting Institute in Bratislava, Slovakia (in Slovak: Vzdelávací a konzultačný inštitút v Bratislave, Slovenská republika). .

== Overview ==
The College of International and Public Relations Prague was founded in 1999 as the School of International and Public Relations Prague Ltd. It developed 6 secondary branches and 2 branches of higher vocational study with 8 specializations – the representative branches of economy and management of commercial and manufacturing companies, hotel management, banking sector, personnel management, diplomatic service and public relations. The university is a place for vocational adult education in the field of Public Relations. At present, the school has adopted a training program for higher vocational school, secondary technical school and an eight-year school.

== Courses ==
The College offers two Bachelor study programs and three Masters programs:

Bachelor: International relations and diplomacy, with the option of profiling Diplomacy and Public Administration and Public Relations, with the option of profiling.

Masters: European studies and public administration and International and Diplomatic Studies.

== Institutions of the University ==
The Education and Consulting Institute in Bratislava provides education for students in the Slovak Republic.

The Czech Institute of Advertisement and Marketing Communication was established in 2000 by The school of International and Public Relations and The Association of Czech Advertising Agencies. the Institute's goal is to organize practical courses for employees of public relation agencies and companies.

The Prague Center for Strategic Studies (PCSS) is a non-governmental and non-profit research institution of the University of International and Public Relations Prague (VŠMVVP). PCSS stimulates and coordinates research for VŠMVVP. It mainly deals with exploring international relations, namely in political relations, with particular emphasis on the world political system, policy, power and the political organization of global importance.

The Institute of Diplomacy and Foreign business is a theoretical–research and development department. It deals primarily with the development of theory and research in the field of diplomatic relations and issues of terms and links in the field of foreign business. It also collects documents and information on the theoretical and research objectives, provides evaluation, treatment and transfer of lessons learned institutions of public administration, professional associations and other relevant institutions. This work is done in cooperation with the business community, particularly in relation to export promotion, foreign business and its participation in international projects.

The Center of Scientific Information of the CIS states and their regions (SVRI) is a research and scientific department established for analysis and is an information center. It deals with the collection and evaluation of information and research of political, economic and security relations of Central and Eastern Europe and in particular the Russian Federation.

== Notable faculty members ==
- prof. PhDr. Zdeněk Veselý, CSc. – History of International relations – author of numerous publications
- prof. PhDr. Zuzana Lehmannová, CSc. – Comparative religions
- prof. JUDr. Pavel Šturma, DrSc.
- doc. Ing. Judita Štouračová, CSc. – Dean – Former Ambassador of the Czech Republic to Serbia and Montenegro
- Dr Miroslav Polreich, Former Czech Ambassador to OSCE Czechoslovak permanent mission to UN
- doc. PhDr. Vladimír Prorok, CSc. – Politicology – author of numerous publications
- prof. Oskar Krejčí CSc. – International relations author of numerous publications
- Dr. Jiří Dienstbier – Former dissident and Minister of Foreign Affairs
- JUDr. Pavel Zářecký, CSc. – former Vice Minister in the Czech Government
- Doc.PhDr. Jiří Bystřický – Theory of mass media and media communication
- Doc. PhDr. Jana Andresíková – Moderation
- doc. PhDr. Felix Černoch, CSc.
