= Vladimir Petrović (ambassador) =

Serbian diplomat

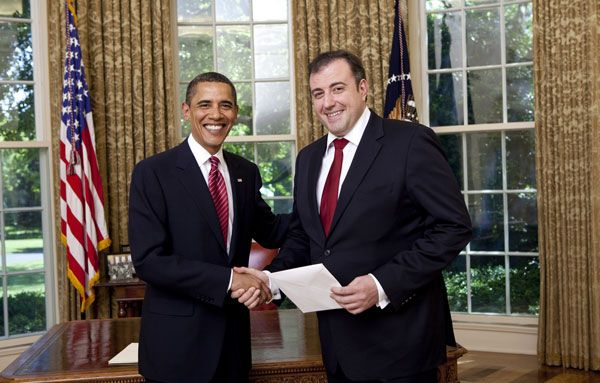
- Petrovic (right) presenting his letters of credence to United States President Barack Obama

Serbian Ambassador to the United States
- In office designated: April 14, 2009 accredited: May 20, 2009 – December 3, 2013
- Preceded by: Ivan Vujačić
- Succeeded by: Vladimir Jovičić

Personal details
- Born: 1978 (age 47–48) Kragujevac
- Parent: Borivoje has twice been mayor of Kragujevac, as well as President of the Assembly of Serbia in 1990. (father)
- Education: Elementary and High school in Belgrade.
- Alma mater: BA degree in Political Sciences Georgia State University

Vladimir Petrović (Serbian Cyrillic: Владимир Петровић; born 1978) is the former Serbian ambassador to the United States.

== See also ==
- Serbia – United States relations
