= Ministry for Kosovo and Metohija =

Ministry of the Serbian government, 2007–2012

- Министарство за Косово и Метохију; Ministarstvo za Kosovo i Metohiju; Ministria për Kosovën dhe Metohinë

Ministry overview
- Formed: 15 May 2007
- Preceding Ministry: Coordination Center for Kosovo and Metohija
- Dissolved: 27 July 2012
- Superseding Ministry: Office for Kosovo and Metohija

The Ministry for Kosovo and Metohija (Serbian: Министарство за Косово и Метохију, romanized: Ministarstvo za Kosovo i Metohiju; Albanian: Ministria për Kosovën dhe Metohinë) was the ministry in the Government of Serbia responsible for the issues relating to Kosovo and Metohija from 2007 to 2012.

== History ==
The ministry was formed on 15 May 2008, taking over the jurisdictions of disbanded Coordination Center for Kosovo and Metohija. It was abolished on 27 July 2012 after the formation of the Office for Kosovo and Metohija, while also one minister without portfolio was in charge for the issues that were in charge of the abolished ministry.

== List of ministers ==
Political Party: DSS DS

Name (Birth–Death)	Party	Term of Office		Prime Minister (Cabinet)
Slobodan Samardžić (1953–)	DSS	15 May 2007	7 July 2008	Koštunica (II)
Goran Bogdanović (1963–)	DS	7 July 2008	27 July 2012	Cvetković (I)

== See also ==
- Office for Kosovo and Metohija
