= Slobodan Samardžić =

Serbian politician

- Слободан Самарџић
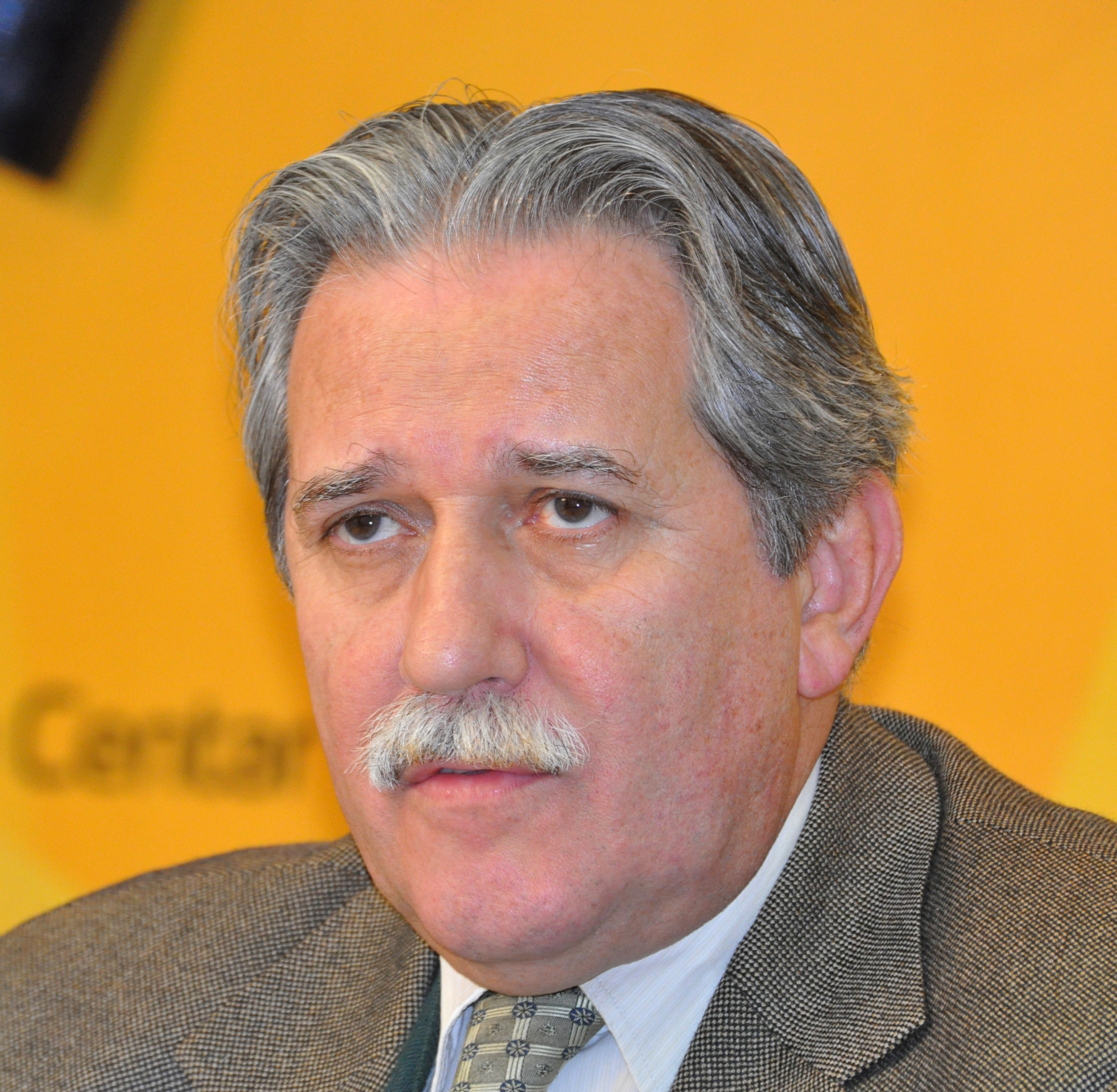

Minister for Kosovo and Metohija
- In office 15 May 2007 – 7 July 2008
- Preceded by: Post established
- Succeeded by: Goran Bogdanović

Personal details
- Born: 3 April 1953 (age 73) Belgrade, FPR Yugoslavia
- Party: Democratic Party of Serbia (until 2014); Statehood Movement of Serbia (2014–present)
- Spouse(s): Vesna Samardžić, née Olić
- Children: Two sons and a daughter
- Education: University of Belgrade (BA, MPhil and PhD in political science)
- Occupation: University professor
- Profession: Political scientist

Slobodan Samardžić (Serbian Cyrillic: Слободан Самарџић) is a Serbian academic and politician who served as the Minister for Kosovo and Metohija from 2007 to 2008.

== Early years and education ==
Samardžić was born in Belgrade in 1953 to Serb parents from Bosnia and Montenegro. His family hails from the influential Samardžić brotherhood of the Herzegovinan Krivošije clan, specifically from the area near Herceg Novi, in Montenegro.

Samardžić graduated from the University of Belgrade Faculty of Political Sciences, where he also obtained his PhD.

== Professional career ==
He was editor of scientific and political program at Radio Belgrade from 1982 to 1984. He was a fellow of the Institute of European Studies. From 2001 to 2023, Samardžić was a full professor of European Studies at the Faculty of Political Sciences of the University of Belgrade. He is also Director of Political Studies at the Belgrade think-tank Centre for Liberal-Democratic Studies.

Area of his studies includes political ideas and institutions, contemporary federalism, political theory and practice of constitutionalism, political system of Yugoslavia and Serbia, and European Union.

Samardžić has written six books: Ideology and Rationalism (1984), Council Democracy (1987), Yugoslavia and the Challenge of Federalism (1990), Coercive Community and Democracy (1994), European Union as a Model of the Supranational Community (1998), and State Construction and Deconstruction (2008).

Samardžić was advisor for political issues to former Yugoslav president and Serbian Prime Minister Vojislav Koštunica. He headed the Serbian government’s Committee for Decentralisation and was (with Vuk Jeremić) co-ordinator of Serbia's State Negotiating Team on the future status of Kosovo-Metohija.

== Personal life ==
Samardžić speaks English and German. He is married and has three children.

== Media ==
Slobodan Samardžić appears in Boris Malagurski's documentary film The Weight of Chains in which he talks about the motives behind Western intervention in the Kosovo War. In the film, Samardžić also speaks about concerns regarding the status of Serbia's northern province of Vojvodina.

Government offices
| Preceded by Post established | Minister for Kosovo and Metohija; 2007 – 2008 | Succeeded by Goran Bogdanović |
