= Autonomous Province of Kosovo and Metohija =

Territory disputed by Serbia and Kosovo

Kosovo and Metohija: Косово и Метохиja (Serbian); Kosovo i Metohija (Serbian); Kosova dhe Metohia (Albanian)
- Autonomous province
- Autonomous Province of Kosovo and Metohija: Аутономна покрајина Косово и Метохиja (Serbian); Autonomna pokrajina Kosovo i Metohija (Serbian); Krahina Autonome e Kosovës dhe Metohisë (Albanian)
- Location of Kosovo and Metohija within Serbia
- Coordinates: 42°40′N 21°10′E
- Country: Serbia
- Treaty of London: 30 May 1913
- Socialist Autonomous Province: 31 January 1946
- Autonomy increased: 21 February 1974
- Autonomy decreased: 28 March 1989
- Kosovo War: 28 February 1998 – 11 June 1999
- UN Administration: 10 June 1999
- Brussels Agreement: 19 April 2013
- Administrative center: Pristina

Government
  - Type: Autonomous province (disputed): Claimed by Serbia as an autonomous province (under UN Security Council resolution 1244).
  - Body: Office for Kosovo and Metohija (Government of Serbia)
  - Director: Petar Petković

Area
  - Total: 10,887 km^{2} (4,203 sq mi)

Population
  - Total: 1,586,659
  - Density: 145.74/km^{2} (377.46/sq mi)

Languages
  - Official languages: Albanian; Serbian
- Time zone: UTC+01:00 (CET)
  - Summer (DST): UTC+02:00 (CEST)
- ISO 3166 code: RS-KM

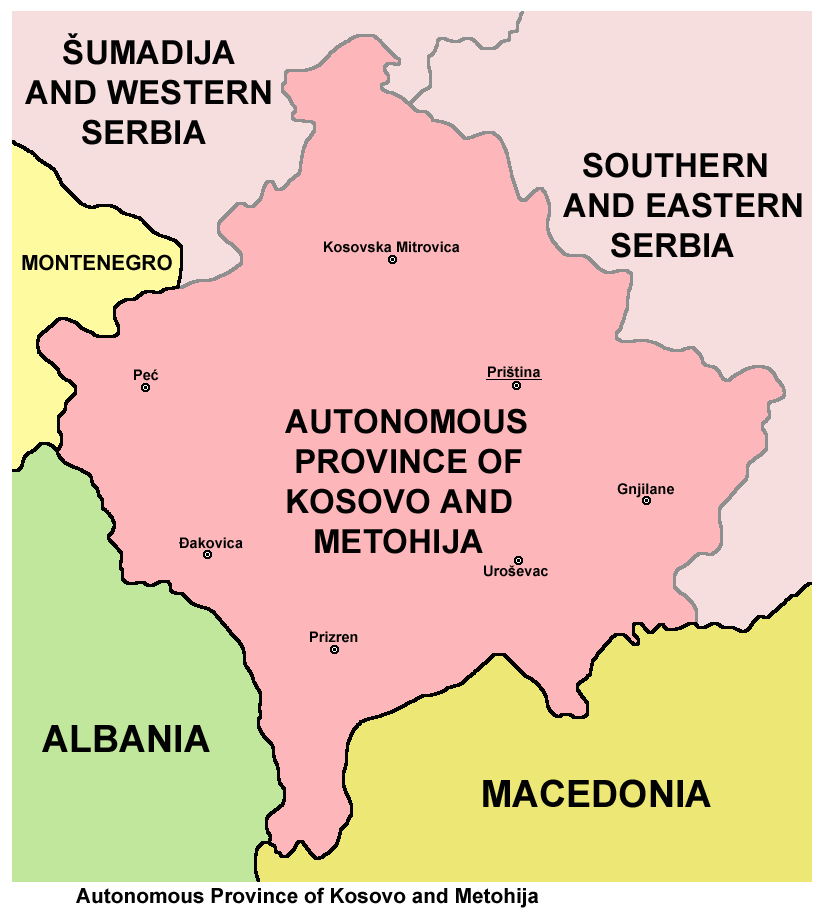
Map of the Autonomous Province of Kosovo and Metohija as claimed by Serbia

Kosovo and Metohija (Serbian: Косово и Метохиja, romanized: Kosovo i Metohija, Albanian: Kosova dhe Metohia), officially the Autonomous Province of Kosovo and Metohija (Serbian: Аутономна покрајина Косово и Метохиja, romanized: Autonomna pokrajina Kosovo i Metohija, Albanian: Krahina Autonome e Kosovës dhe Metohisë), commonly known as Kosovo (Serbian: Косово, Albanian: Kosova) and abbreviated to Kosmet (from Kosovo and Metohija; Serbian: Космет) or KiM (Serbian: КиМ), is an autonomous province that occupies the southernmost corner of Serbia, as defined by the country's constitution. The territory is the subject of an ongoing political and territorial dispute between the Republic of Serbia and the partially recognised Republic of Kosovo, with the KiM being viewed as the de jure interpretation of the territory under Serbian law; however, the Serbian government currently does not control the territories because they are administered by the Republic of Kosovo. Its claimed administrative capital and largest city is Pristina.

The territory of the province, as defined by Serbian laws, lies in the southern part of Serbia and covers the regions of Kosovo and Metohija. The territory was previously an autonomous province of Serbia during Socialist Yugoslavia (1946–1990), and acquired its current status in 1990. The province was governed as part of Serbia until the Kosovo War (1998–99), when it came under United Nations (UN) administration in accordance with United Nations Security Council Resolution 1244, but still remained internationally recognized as part of the then Federal Republic of Yugoslavia. On 17 February 2008, representatives of the people of Kosovo (Albanian: Udhëheqësit e popullit tonë, të zgjedhur në mënyrë demokratike) unilaterally and extra-institutionally declared Kosovo's independence, which is internationally recognized by 110 UN members. While it is de facto independent from Serbia, Serbia still regards it as its province.

== Overview ==
In 1990, the Socialist Autonomous Province of Kosovo, an autonomous province of Serbia within Yugoslavia, had undergone the anti-bureaucratic revolution by Slobodan Milošević's government which resulted in the reduction of its powers, effectively returning it to its constitutional status of 1971–74. The same year, its Albanian majority—as well as the Republic of Albania—supported the proclamation of an independent Republic of Kosova. Following the end of the Kosovo War 1999, and as a result of NATO intervention, Serbia and the federal government no longer exercised de facto control over the territory.

In February 2008, the Republic of Kosovo declared independence. While Serbia has not recognised Kosovo's independence, in the 2013 Brussels Agreement, it abolished all its institutions in the Autonomous Province. As of 19 December 2025, Kosovo's independence is currently recognized by 110 UN member states. In 2013, the Serbian government announced it was dissolving the Serb minority assemblies it had created in northern Kosovo, in order to allow the integration of the Kosovo Serb minority into the general population of Kosovo.

== History ==
=== Socialist Yugoslavia ===
Between 1945 and 1963 the region was officially named the Autonomous Region of Kosovo and Metohija, with a level of self-government lower than that of the Autonomous Province of Vojvodina. In 1963 it was granted the same level of autonomy as Vojvodina, and accordingly its official name was changed to Autonomous Province of Kosovo and Metohija. In 1968, the prefix "Socialist" was added and the term "Metohija" was dropped, changing the official name of the province to Socialist Autonomous Province of Kosovo. In 1974 both autonomous provinces (Vojvodina and Kosovo) were granted significantly increased levels of autonomy. In 1990 the term "Metohija" was reinserted into the provincial name, with "Socialist" being dropped. From that point on the official name of the province was once again Autonomous Province of Kosovo and Metohija.

=== Anti-bureaucratic revolution ===
Constitutional changes were made in Yugoslavia in 1990. The parliaments of all Yugoslavian republics and provinces, which until then had MPs only from the League of Communists of Yugoslavia, were dissolved and multi-party elections were held within them. Kosovar Albanians refused to participate in the elections so they held their own unsanctioned elections instead. As election laws required (and still require) turnout higher than 50%, a parliament in Kosovo could not be established.

The new constitution abolished the individual provinces' official media, integrating them within the official media of Serbia while still retaining some programs in the Albanian language. The Albanian-language media in Kosovo were suppressed. Funding was withdrawn from state-owned media, including those in the Albanian language in Kosovo. The constitution made the creation of privately owned media possible, however their operation was very difficult because of high rents and restrictive laws. State-owned Albanian language television or radio was also banned from broadcasting from Kosovo. However, privately owned Albanian media outlets appeared; of these, probably the most famous is "Koha Ditore", which was allowed to operate until late 1998 when it was closed after publishing a calendar glorifying ethnic Albanian separatists.

The constitution also transferred control over state-owned companies to the Yugoslav central government. In September 1990, up to 123,000 ethnic Albanian workers were dismissed from their positions in government and media, as were teachers, doctors, and civil servants, provoking a general strike and mass unrest. Some of those who were not sacked quit in sympathy, refusing to work for the Serbian government. Although the sackings were widely seen as a purge of ethnic Albanians, the government maintained that it was removing former communist directors.

Albanian educational curriculum textbooks were withdrawn and replaced by new ones. The curriculum was (and still is, as this is the curriculum used for ethnic Albanians in Serbia outside Kosovo) identical to its Serbian counterpart and that of all other nationalities in Serbia except that it had education on and in the Albanian language. Education in Albanian was withdrawn in 1992 and re-established in 1994. At the University of Pristina, which was seen as a centre of Kosovo Albanian cultural identity, education in the Albanian language was abolished and ethnic Albanian teachers were also dismissed in large numbers. Albanians responded by boycotting state schools and setting up an unofficial parallel system of Albanian-language education.

Kosovo Albanians were outraged by what they saw as an attack on their rights. Following mass rioting and unrest from ethnic Albanians as well as outbreaks of inter-communal violence, in February 1990, a state of emergency was declared and the presence of the Yugoslav Army and police was significantly increased to quell the unrest.

On 2 July 1990, еthnic Albanian members of the provincial assembly declared Kosovo а republic within the Yugoslav federation. The "Republic of Kosova" was declared an independent state by the assembly 22 September 1991. Unsanctioned elections were held in 1992, which overwhelmingly elected Ibrahim Rugova as "president" of a self-declared Republic of Kosova; Serb authorities rejected the election results, and tried to capture and prosecute those who had voted.

In 1995, thousands of Serb refugees from Croatia were settled in Kosovo, which further worsened relations between the two communities.

=== Kosovo War and NATO bombing of Yugoslavia ===
Ethnic Albanian opposition to the sovereignty of Yugoslavia and especially Serbia had previously resulted in rioting (1968 and 1981) in the capital Pristina. Rugova initially advocated non-violent resistance, but later opposition took the form of separatist agitation by opposition political groups and armed action from 1995 by the "Kosovo Liberation Army" (Ushtria Çlirimtare e Kosovës, or UÇK) whose activities led to the Insurgency in Kosovo which led to the Kosovo War in 1998.

The worsening security situation resulted in the United Nations Security Council passing Resolution 1199 demanding an immediate ceasefire. A subsequent agreement between Yugoslavia and NATO led to the deployment of an OSCE verification mission in Kosovo. In early 1999, the Rambouillet conference was convened in an attempt to end the Kosovo conflict. Following a failure to reach an agreement, NATO launched a bombing campaign against Yugoslavia in March resulting in Kosovo being placed under United Nations administration in June 1999.

In 2003, the Federal Republic of Yugoslavia was renamed the State Union of Serbia and Montenegro. As a result of the 2006 Montenegrin independence referendum, Montenegro left the federation in June 2006.

On 17 February 2008, representatives of the people of Kosovo unilaterally declared Kosovo's independence, an act not recognised by Serbia.

== Politics ==
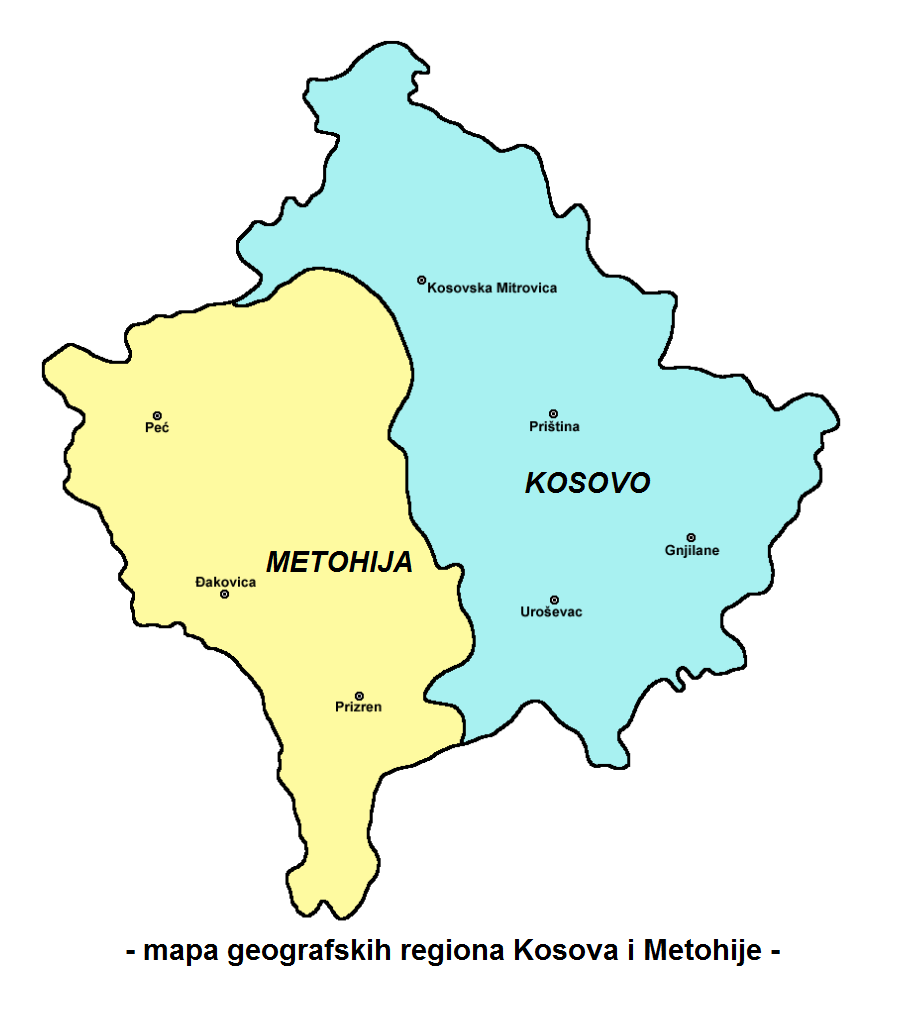
The regions of Metohija (yellow), and Kosovo (blue)

Since 1999, the Serb-inhabited areas of Kosovo have been governed as a de facto independent region from the Albanian-dominated government in Pristina. They continue to use Serbian national symbols and participate in Serbian national elections, which are boycotted in the rest of Kosovo; in turn, they boycott Kosovo's elections. The municipalities of Leposavić, Zvečan and Zubin Potok are run by local Serbs, while the Kosovska Mitrovica municipality had rival Serbian and Albanian governments until a compromise was agreed in November 2002.

The Serb areas have united into a community, the Union of Serbian Districts and District Units of Kosovo and Metohija established in February 2003 by Serbian delegates meeting in North Mitrovica, which has since served as the de facto "capital." The Union's president is Dragan Velić. There is also a central governing body, the Serbian National Council for Kosovo and Metohija (SNV). The President of SNV in North Kosovo is Dr Milan Ivanović, while the head of its Executive Council is Rada Trajković.

Local politics are dominated by the Serbian List for Kosovo and Metohija. The Serbian List was led by Oliver Ivanović, an engineer from Kosovska Mitrovica.

In February 2007 the Union of Serbian Districts and District Units of Kosovo and Metohija has transformed into the Serbian Assembly of Kosovo and Metohija presided by Marko Jakšić. The Assembly strongly criticised the secessionist movements of the Albanian-dominated PISG Assembly of Kosovo and demanded unity of the Serb people in Kosovo, boycott of EULEX and announced massive protests in support of Serbia's sovereignty over Kosovo. On 18 February 2008, day after Kosovo's unilateral declaration of independence, the Assembly declared it "null and void".

Also, there was a Ministry for Kosovo and Metohija within the Serbian government, with Goran Bogdanović as Minister for Kosovo and Metohija. In 2012, that ministry was downgraded to the Office for Kosovo and Metohija, with Aleksandar Vulin as the head of the new office. However, in 2013, the post was raised to that of a Minister without portfolio in charge of Kosovo and Metohija.

== Administrative divisions ==
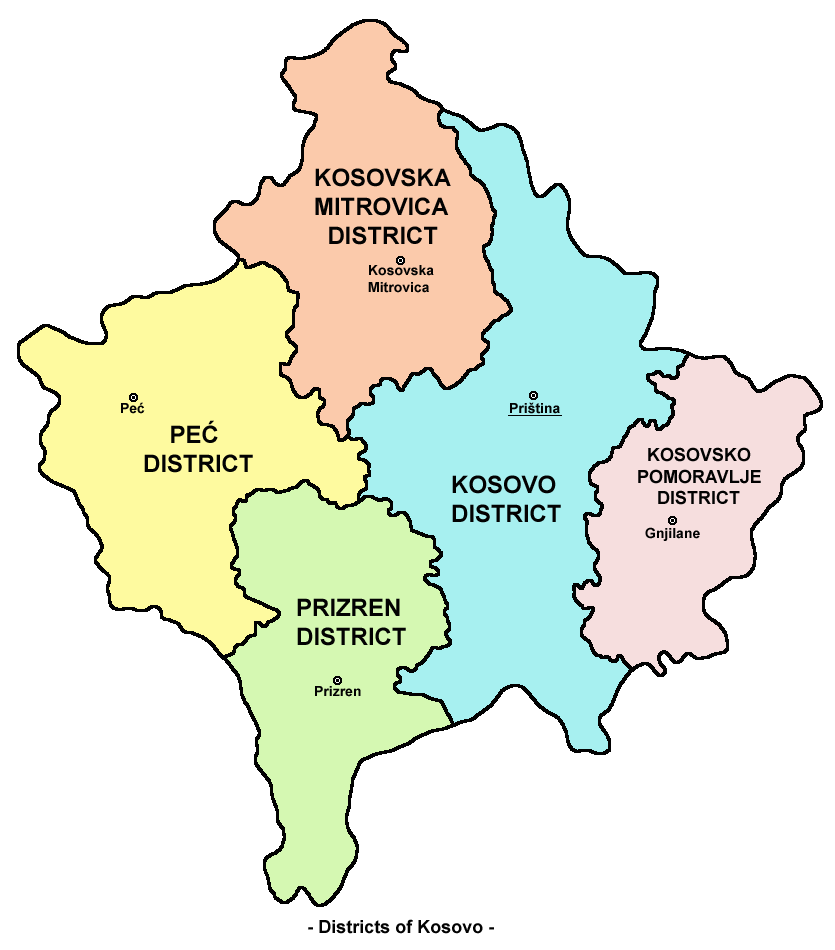
Districts in Kosovo and Metohija

Under the Serbian system of administration, Kosovo is divided into five districts comprising 28 municipalities and 1 city. In 2000, UNMIK established a system with 7 districts and 30 municipalities. Serbia has not exercised effective control over Kosovo since 1999. For the UNMIK created districts of Kosovo, see Districts of Kosovo.

District	Seat	Area	Population in 2016 (rank)	Municipalities and cities
Kosovo District (Kosovski okrug)	Pristina	3,095 km^{2} (1,195 sq mi)	672,292	Pristina; Drenica; Kosovo Polje; Lipljan; Obilić; Podujevo; Uroševac; Štimlje; Kačanik; Štrpce
Kosovo-Pomoravlje District (Kosovsko-Pomoravski okrug)	Gnjilane	1,389 km^{2} (536 sq mi)	166,212	Kosovska Kamenica; Novo Brdo; Gnjilane; Vitina
Kosovska Mitrovica District (Kosovskomitrovički okrug)	Kosovska Mitrovica	2,054 km^{2} (793 sq mi)	225,212	Kosovska Mitrovica; Leposavić; Srbica; Vučitrn; Zubin Potok; Zvečan
Peć District (Pećki okrug)	Peć	2,459 km^{2} (949 sq mi)	178,326	Peć; Istok; Klina; Đakovica; Dečani
Prizren District (Prizrenski okrug)	Prizren	1,902 km^{2} (734 sq mi)	376,085	Orahovac; Suva Reka; Prizren; Dragaš

== See also ==
- Albanians in Serbia
- North Kosovo

== Sources ==
- Bennett, Christopher (1995). Yugoslavia's Bloody Collapse: Causes, Course and Consequences. London: Hurst & Company. ISBN 9781850652281.
- Ćirković, Sima (2004). The Serbs. Malden: Blackwell Publishing. ISBN 9781405142915.
- Pavlowitch, Stevan K. (2002). Serbia: The History behind the Name. London: Hurst & Company. ISBN 9781850654773.
- Ramet, Sabrina P.; Pavlaković, Vjeran, eds. (2007) [2005]. Serbia Since 1989: Politics and Society Under Milošević and After. Seattle: University of Washington Press. ISBN 978-0295985381.
