= Goran Bogdanović (politician) =

Serbian politician (born 1963)

Goran Bogdanović MP
- Горан Богдановић
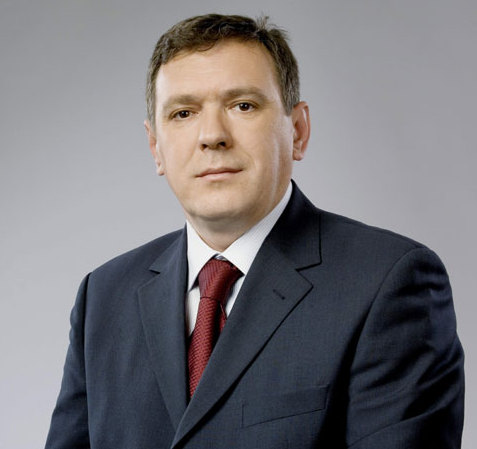

Minister for Kosovo and Metohija
- In office 7 July 2008 – 27 July 2012
- Preceded by: Slobodan Samardžić
- Succeeded by: Post abolished

Personal details
- Born: 2 February 1963 (age 63) Raška, FPR Yugoslavia
- Party: SDS (2014–present); DS (2000–2014)

Goran Bogdanović (Serbian Cyrillic: Горан Богдановић, born 2 February 1963) is a Serbian politician who served as the Minister for Kosovo and Metohija in the Cabinet of Mirko Cvetković from 2008 to 2012.

== Early years and education ==
He was born in 1963 in Raška and holds a degree from the University of Belgrade Faculty of Agriculture.

== Professional career ==
From 1992 to 1996, he was manager of JUKO in Srbica. Afterwards held the position of as state agricultural inspector until 2002, before becoming Minister of Agriculture of Kosovo and Metohija and later on resuming the position of state agricultural inspector.

Bogdanović has been a member of the Demokratska Stranka since 2000 and leads the Party provincial committee. He was elected MP to the National Assembly of Serbia on 21 January 2007. On 7 July 2008, he was named Minister for Kosovo and Metohija. On 13 January 2010, he was stopped and then escorted by Kosovo Police to the Kosovo-Serbia border at Merdare, for "illegal political activities". In June 2012, he was banned from entering Kosovo for trying to enter "illegally".

== Personal life ==
Bogdanović is married with two sons. He speaks Russian, English and his native Serbian.

== See also ==
- Politics of Serbia
- Autonomous Province of Kosovo and Metohija

Government offices
Preceded by Slobodan Samardžić	Minister for Kosovo and Metohija; 2008 – 2012	Succeeded by Aleksandar Vulin as director of Office for Kosovo and Metohija
