= Office for Kosovo and Metohija =

- Канцеларија за Косово и Метохију; Kancelarija za Kosovo i Metohiju; Zyra për Kosovën dhe Metohinë
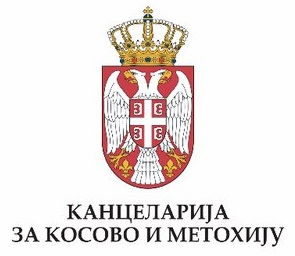

Office overview
- Formed: 2 August 2012
- Preceding Office: Ministry for Kosovo and Metohija
- Headquarters: Palace of Serbia, Bulevar Mihajla Pupina 2, Belgrade
- Office executive: Petar Petković, Director
- Website: kim.gov.rs

The Office for Kosovo and Metohija (Serbian: Канцеларија за Косово и Метохију, romanized: Kancelarija za Kosovo i Metohiju; Albanian: Zyra për Kosovën dhe Metohinë) is one of bodies of the Government of Serbia. It was constituted on 2 August 2012 after the dissolution of the Ministry for Kosovo and Metohija. The current office director is Petar Petković.

== Organization and jurisdiction ==
The director is in charge of the Office, and is appointed by the Government. The mandate of the director is 5 years.

The Jurisdiction of the Office is established by its statute:

- Monitoring of conclusion and implementation of international agreements related to Kosovo and Metohija.
- Maintaining contacts with international organizations, countries, NGOs, and other relevant institutions regarding the future status of Kosovo and Metohija.
- Monitoring the implementation of international agreements in the field of human rights in Kosovo and Metohija.
- Monitoring compliance with Resolution 1244 and the Constitutional Framework in the process of concluding international agreements by the Special Representative of the UN Secretary General.
- Analysis of the drafts of resolutions submitted to the UN Security Council.
- Monitoring, cooperation and coordination with international military forces.
- Protection of rights and the return of refugees and internally displaced persons from Kosovo and Metohija, as well as internally displaced persons in Kosovo and Metohija.
- Repair and construction of houses for the returnees, building the infrastructure, the provision of humanitarian and emergency aid for vulnerable Serbian and non-Albanian population in Kosovo and Metohija.
- The implementation of the decision centers for social work and child protection.
- Informing social work centers and concerned citizens of recognized and implemented social benefits.
- Recording and processing of submissions, as well as all interested parties from Kosovo and Metohija in relation to the rights of labor relations and labor law.
- Cooperation with the National Employment Service and proposing measures for improvement of informing citizens about the job vacancies in Kosovo and Metohija, the benefits for the unemployed and employers, as well as finding employment opportunities.
- Functioning of the institutions of the Republic of Serbia in Kosovo and Metohija.
- Social policy, culture, media, religious issues, restoration of cultural and spiritual heritage of Serbia and the Serbian Orthodox Church in Kosovo.
- Infrastructure and telecommunications in the Serbian areas of Kosovo and Metohija.
- Financial, legal, technical and professional assistance in all areas of significance for Serbs and other non-Albanian communities in Kosovo and Metohija.
- Legal protection of persons belonging to national minorities and legal persons from Kosovo and Metohija.
- Coordination of activities in the field of economy and economic development with line ministries and other relevant bodies and organizations of the Republic of Serbia.
- Improving the energy, transport and telecommunications.
- Formulation of draft legislation which provides substantial autonomy of Kosovo and the implementation of state policy to protect the territorial integrity of the Republic of Serbia, as well as other functions from the Department.

== List of directors ==
Political Party: DSS DS PS SNS

Name	Party	Term of office		Time in office
Ministry for Kosovo and Metohija
Slobodan Samardžić (born 1953)	DSS	15 May 2007	7 July 2008	1 year, 53 days
Goran Bogdanović (born 1963)	DS	7 July 2008	27 July 2012	4 years, 20 days
Office for Kosovo and Metohija
Aleksandar Vulin (born 1972)	PS	27 July 2012	2 September 2013	1 year, 37 days
Marko Đurić (born 1983)	SNS	2 September 2013	8 October 2020	7 years, 36 days
Petar Petković (born 1980)	SNS	8 October 2020	Present	6 years, 25 days

== See also ==
- Ministry for Kosovo and Metohija
