= Marko Đurić =

Serbian politician (born 1983)

- Марко Ђурић
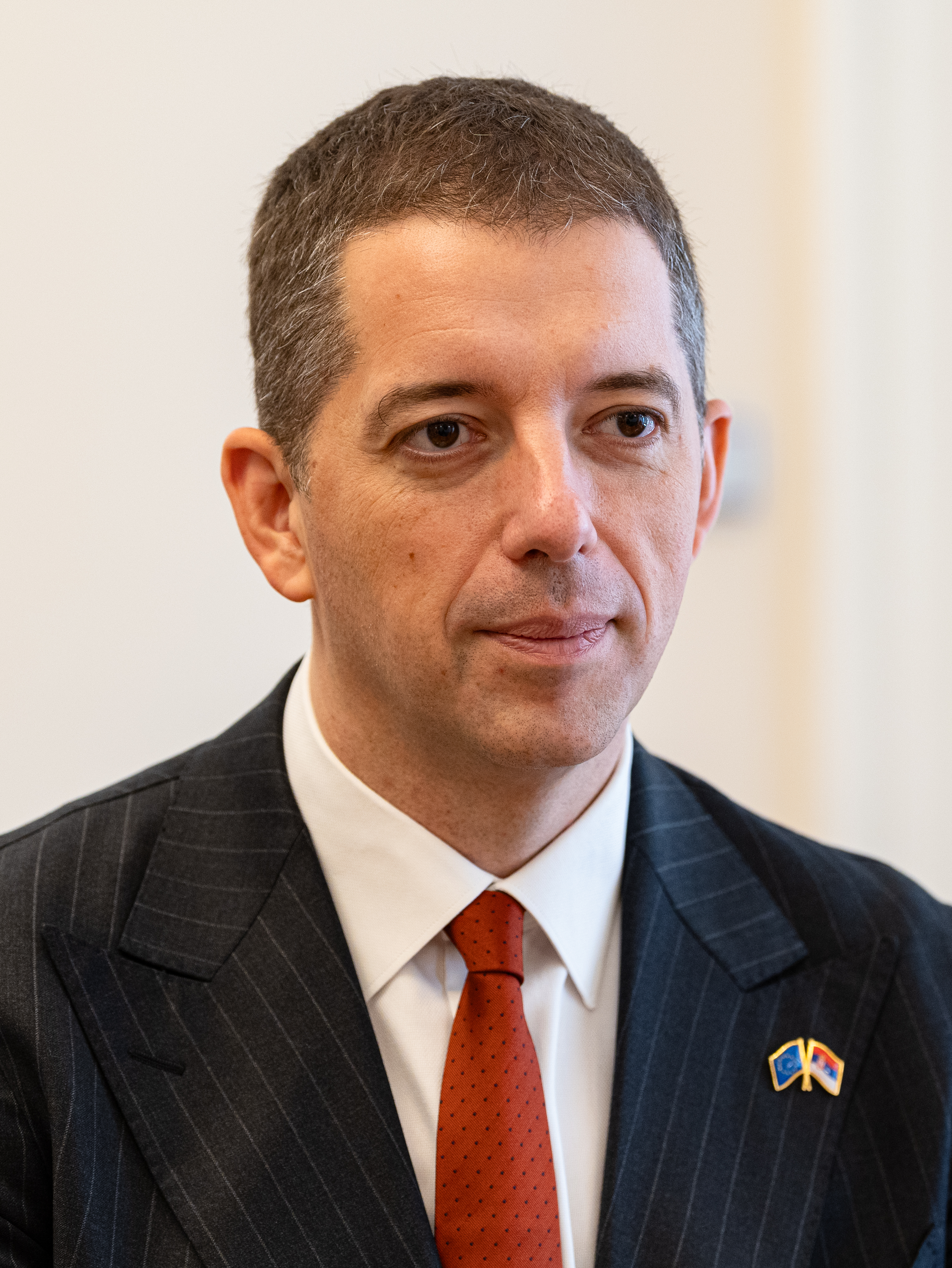
- Đurić in 2024

Minister of Foreign Affairs
- Incumbent
- Assumed office 2 May 2024
- Prime Minister: Miloš Vučević; Đuro Macut
- Preceded by: Ivica Dačić

Ambassador of Serbia to the United States of America
- In office 8 October 2020 – 30 April 2024
- President: Aleksandar Vučić
- Preceded by: Đerđ Matković
- Succeeded by: Dragan Šutanovac

Director of the Office for Kosovo and Metohija
- In office 2 September 2013 – 8 October 2020
- Prime Minister: Ivica Dačić; Aleksandar Vučić; Ana Brnabić
- Preceded by: Aleksandar Vulin
- Succeeded by: Petar Petković

Foreign Policy Advisor to the President of Serbia
- In office 1 June 2012 – 27 May 2014
- President: Tomislav Nikolić

Personal details
- Born: 25 June 1983 (age 43) Belgrade, SR Serbia, SFR Yugoslavia
- Party: SNS (2008–present)
- Children: 3
- Education: Faculty of Law
- Alma mater: University of Belgrade
- Occupation: Politician

Marko Đurić (Serbian Cyrillic: Марко Ђурић; born 25 June 1983) is a Serbian politician and diplomat who has served as the minister of foreign affairs since 2024. Prior to becoming a government minister, Đurić was the ambassador of Serbia to the United States of America from 2020 to 2024, and the non-resident ambassador of Serbia to Colombia from 2021 to 2024.

Previously, Đurić served as the director of the Office for Kosovo and Metohija from 2 September 2013 to 8 October 2020. He has also served as the foreign policy adviser to the president of Serbia from 2012 to 2014. Being a member of the Serbian Progressive Party since its founding in 2008, he currently serves as party's vice president and as member of party's Council for Foreign Policy and European Integration.

== Early life and education ==
Đurić was born in 1983 in Belgrade and is Jewish through his maternal grandmother neurophysiologist Mira Pašić née Šenberger, a researcher at the Institute Siniša Stanković and a lecturer at the Faculty of Natural Sciences and Mathematics in Belgrade. His maternal grandfather, Najdan Pašić, was a professor, social and political theorist, and one of the founders of the University of Belgrade Faculty of Political Sciences. Đurić's great-granduncle is Nikola Pašić who served as Prime Minister of Serbia and Yugoslavia in the first half of the 20th century. Đurić enrolled as a student of a 4-year program of the Faculty of law in 2002, and graduated 8 years later, in 2010. Đurić speaks Serbian, English, Hebrew, and basic French.

== Career ==
Đurić joined Otpor movement in 2000 and became an activist of its press team, taking part in the 5 October Overthrow that same year, which led to the overthrowing of Slobodan Milošević's regime. Đurić has also hosted and edited a youth political radio talk show at the nationally broadcast Radio Belgrade 202 station in 2001 and 2002. From 2002 to 2008, he was a member of the Student parliament at his faculty, where he organised and chaired several public discussions and participated in various student competitions (public speech, moot courts).

=== Joining the Serbian Progressive Party ===
In 2008, Đurić wrote an analysis of the proposed new Statute of the Autonomous Province of Vojvodina. He was among the founding members of the Serbian Progressive Party (SNS). In 2009, Đurić became SNS legal team coordinator and assistant to the Party Deputy President Aleksandar Vučić. Since 2010, he is a member of the SNS Main Board, also acting as a party spokesman. In 2011, Đurić helped the establishment and started coordination of SNS Foreign policy and European integration team, took very active and noticeable role during the 2012 election campaign. In late 2012, he became a member of the presidency of the Serbian Progressive Party.

In 2011, Đurić was employed as a researcher at the Institute for Political Studies in Belgrade, freezing his status at the institute after SNS and its candidate Tomislav Nikolić won the general and presidential election in May 2012, and Đurić entered office as the president.

In June 2012, Đurić was appointed a foreign policy adviser to the president of the Republic of Serbia, with coordination of top officials' activities regarding the International reaction to the 2008 Kosovo declaration of independence and preparation of a Serbian official platform for Belgrade-Pristina negotiations in 2012, along with daily diplomatic communication and strategic policy planning being some of many of his important duties.

=== Director of the Office for Kosovo and Metohija ===
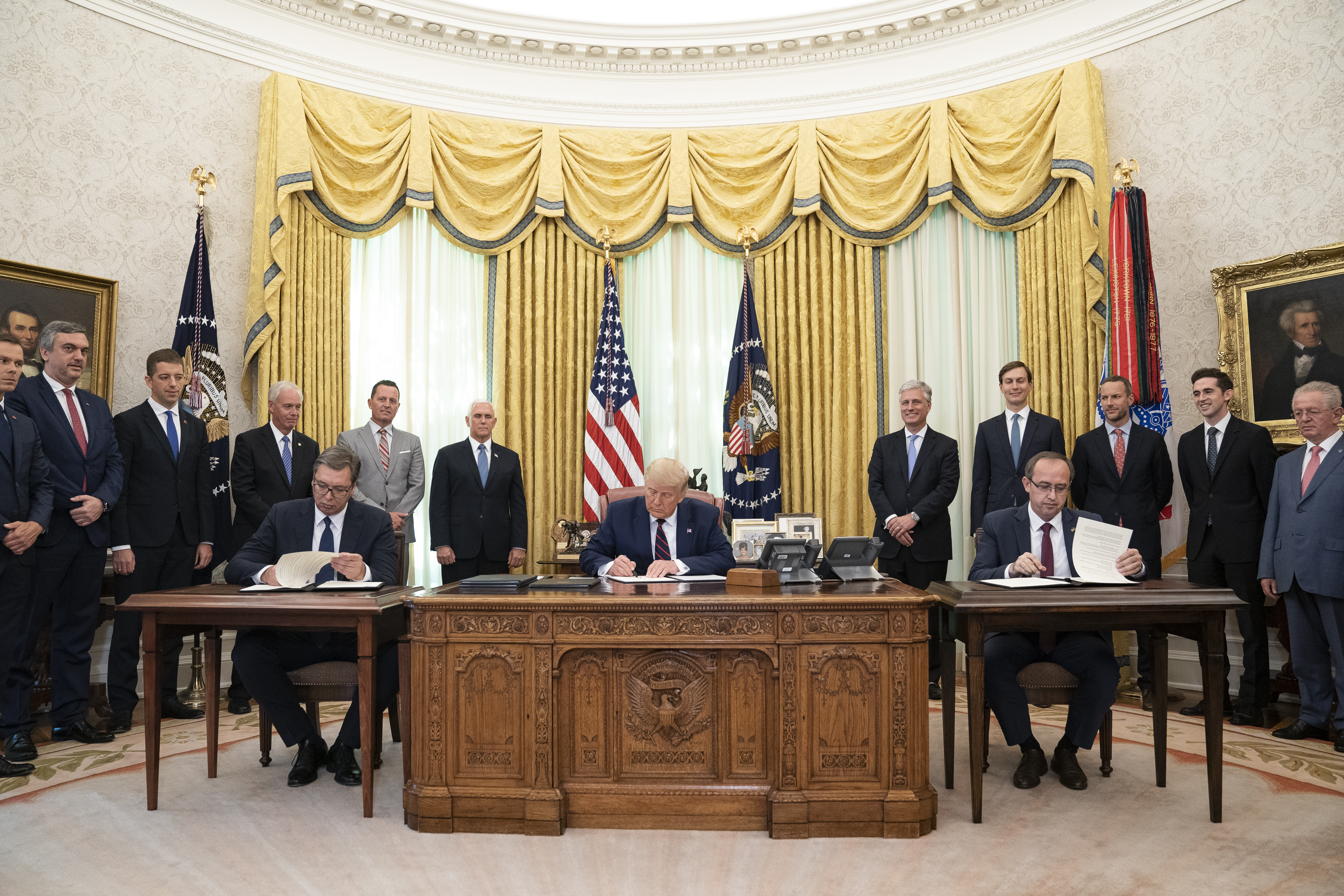
Đurić (third from the left) in September 2020 at the White House at the signing of the Kosovo and Serbia economic normalization agreements in the presence of Donald Trump.

On 2 September 2013, Đurić was appointed as the director of Office for Kosovo and Metohija in the Government of Serbia.

Đurić was arrested during the meeting with local Serbs at 26 March 2018 in North Mitrovica by the Special Units of Kosovo Police, after crossing the territory of Kosovo. Kosovo's deputy prime minister Enver Hoxhaj claimed that Đurić's presence in Kosovo "without authorization" of the Kosovar authorities was in breach of EU agreements between the two sides (Brussels Agreement). During the arrest, many journalists were injured by some members of Kosovo Police which was condemned by European Broadcasting Union and OSCE. The act of arrest and violence was condemned by Serbian President Aleksandar Vučić who said that Đurić's trip was legal and in fact according to the Brussels agreement. Đurić was then taken to Pristina, the capital of Kosovo, brought in front of a judge and then escorted from the territory of Kosovo.

=== Ambassador of Serbia to the United States of America ===
On 8 October 2020, Đurić was named the new Ambassador of Serbia to the United States of America replacing Đerđ Matković.

On 18 October, Đurić said that 2020 Nagorno-Karabakh conflict is a warning to those who do not believe that Kosovo is still an international powder keg.

=== Minister of Foreign Affairs ===
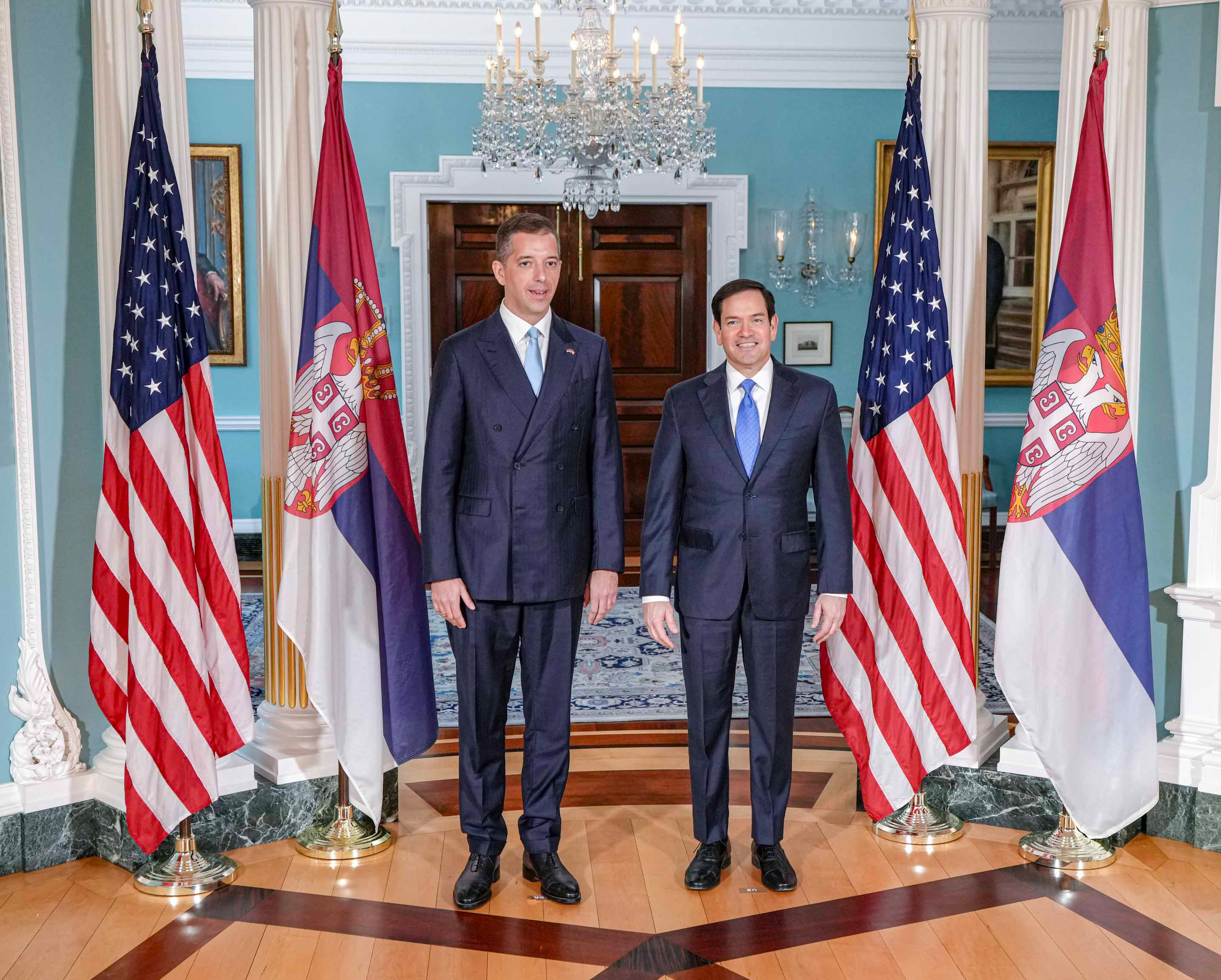
Đurić with the United States Secretary of State Marco Rubio

Đurić was appointed the minister of foreign affairs in the cabinet of Miloš Vučević on 2 May 2024, succeeding Ivica Dačić. Following a meeting with the United States ambassador Christopher R. Hill, Đurić announced the strengthening of cooperation with the United States. On 12 May 2024, Đurić met with the Ukrainian minister of foreign affairs Dmytro Kuleba and the first lady Olena Zelenska. On 6 August 2025 Đurić met with the United States Secretary of State Marco Rubio.

Government offices
Preceded by Aleksandar Vulin	Director of the Office for Kosovo and Metohija; 2013–2020	Succeeded by Petar Petković
Preceded by Ivica Dačić	Minister of Foreign Affairs; 2024–present	Succeeded by
Diplomatic posts
Preceded by Đerđ Matković	Serbian ambassador to the United States; 2020–2024	Succeeded by Vladimir Marić
