= Israel–Yugoslavia relations =

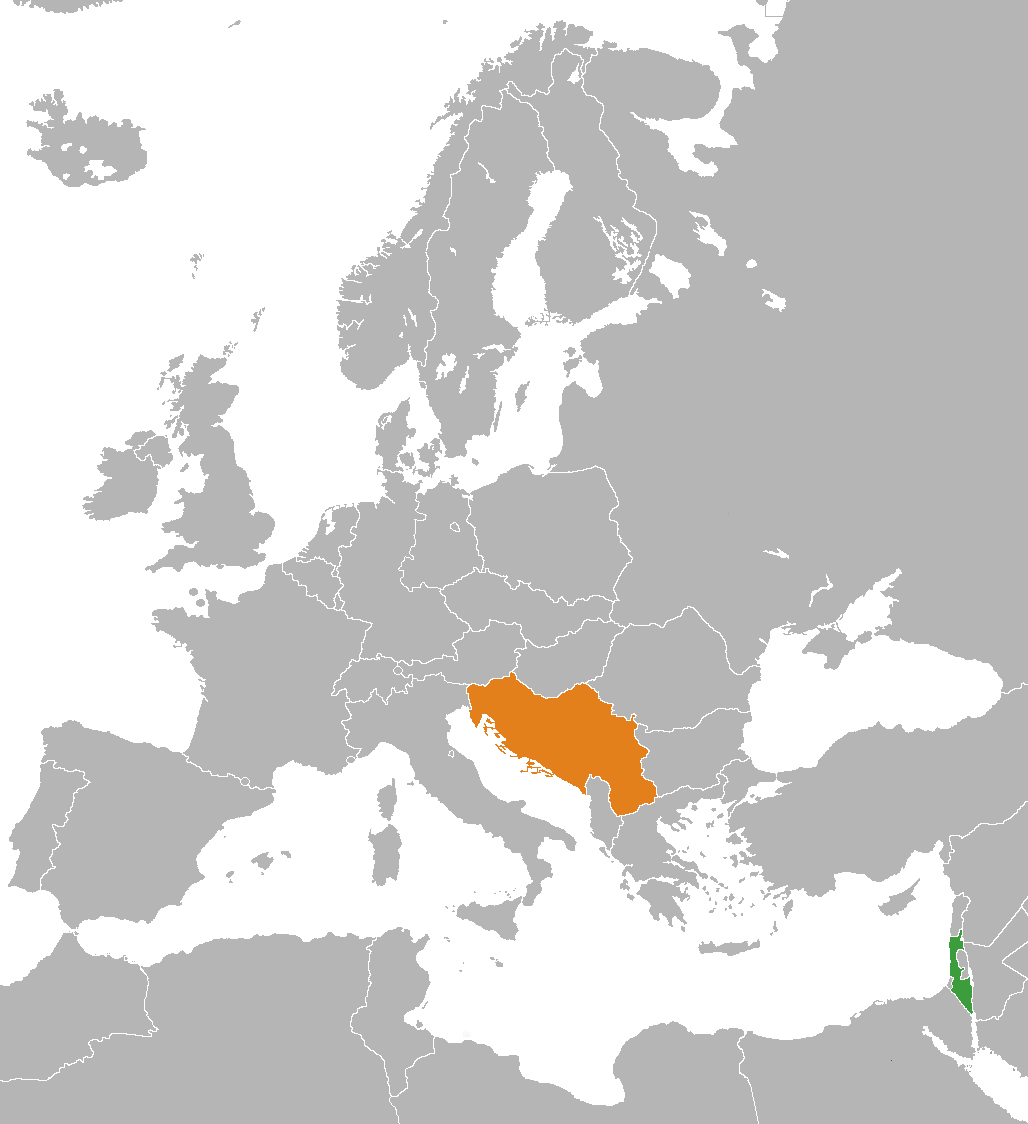

- Israel: Yugoslavia

Israel–Yugoslavia relations were historical foreign relations between Israel and now split-up Socialist Federal Republic of Yugoslavia. Positive initial relations between the two states were subsequently negatively affected by the Arab–Israeli conflict and close relations between Yugoslavia and some Arab states, particularly Yugoslav relations with Egypt. Despite cancelation of the formal relations after the Six-Day War informal, commercial and cultural exchanges continued throughout the Cold War period.

== History ==
Between the end of World War II and creation of the State of Israel, Yugoslavia allowed passage of thousands of Jewish refugees to British Palestine which was perceived as a part of the anti-imperialist struggle. Yugoslavia was one of the 11 members of the United Nations Special Committee on Palestine and one of three which voted against the final proposal with Yugoslav side advocating for bi-national one-state solution. Yugoslavia recognized Israel on 19 May 1948. In 1948 Federation of Jewish Communities in Yugoslavia sought and received permission from the authorities to send material help and organize Jewish emigration to Israel. More than a half of Yugoslav Jews who survived Holocaust have emigrated to Israel. Contrary to other socialist countries in eastern and southeastern Europe, Yugoslavia allowed emigration of its Jewish citizens to Israel, but permitted them to keep only their movable property while the state received real property. Some sources claim that this permission was the result of influence of Moša Pijade, one of the highest ranking Yugoslav functionaries.

An early $2 million trade deal was signed between Yugoslavia and Israel in 1949. This trade volume increased to $22 million by 1965. In 1952, Yugoslavia invited a number of Israeli army officers to study Yugoslav military training courses and observe army maneuvers.

In 1953, funded by the Yugoslav Government, companies, and trade unions, the Jewish Federation of Yugoslavia organized the planting of sixty thousand trees in Israel to commemorate “Jewish victims of fascism.” By 1952 the community independently built fourteen memorials to commemorate Yugoslav Jews, most notable of them in 1952 in Belgrade and Novi Sad in People's Republic of Serbia, Zagreb and Đakovo in People's Republic of Croatia, and Sarajevo in People's Republic of Bosnia and Herzegovina. After 1952, in Serbia alone another forty Holocaust victims monuments were erected with the most prominent one being the Jewish Sephardic Cemetery in Belgrade designed by Bogdan Bogdanović.

Formal bilateral relations between the two states were canceled after the 1967 War with Israel expecting at the time that they will remain interrupted as long as Yugoslavia continues to play leading role in the Third World via the Non-Aligned Movement. Nevertheless, cultural and commercial contacts between the two countries continued with prominent exchanges between the two sides including Habima Theatre visit to Belgrade, establishment of direct JAT flights between Belgrade and Tel Aviv, Elazar Granot visit etc. In 1985 former Yugoslav diplomat Vojimir Šobajik told to Politika that the cancelation of relations was a mistake and that "Israel's legitimacy must not be questioned". Some ascribed decision not to reestablish relations by 1982 (after the death of President Josip Broz Tito) to personal preference of the Foreign Minister Raif Dizdarević who was leading figure in the influential pro-Arab lobby in the country. On 9 September 1988 Simcha Dinitz, chairman of the Jewish Agency for Israel, was the first Israeli representative officially visiting Yugoslavia after the breakup of relations.

In June 1988, the Foreign Affairs committee of the Yugoslav parliament decided that while Israeli government policy regarding the Palestinians remains an obstacle to the re-establishment of diplomatic relations, there is no issue with Yugoslavia acting to foster economic, cultural, and tourism relations between the two countries.

In 1990 Prime Minister of the Socialist Republic of Serbia (one of the six Yugoslav constituent republics) Stanko Radmilović together with 300-member entourage with representatives of numerous companies visited Israel. Reestablishment of the formal diplomatic relations between the two states (at the Yugoslav federal level) was ultimately delayed and never implemented due to concerns at the federal level Ministry of Foreign Affairs, differences in opinion between the six republics and ultimately breakup and Yugoslav Wars. Formal diplomatic relations were renewed only on January 31, 1992, when SFR Yugoslavia had already started dissolving.

== See also ==
- Yugoslavia and the Non-Aligned Movement
- World War II in Yugoslavia
- Yugoslav Partisans
  - Rab battalion
- Bosnia and Herzegovina–Israel relations
- History of the Jews in Bosnia and Herzegovina
- Israel–Serbia relations
- Palestine–Serbia relations
- History of the Jews in Serbia
- Jewish Historical Museum, Belgrade
- Croatia–Israel relations
- History of the Jews in Croatia
- Israel–North Macedonia relations
- History of the Jews in North Macedonia
- Israel–Montenegro relations
- History of the Jews in Montenegro
- Israel–Slovenia relations
- History of the Jews in Slovenia
- Israel–Kosovo relations
- Kosovo and Serbia economic normalization agreements (2020)
