= Palestine–Serbia relations =

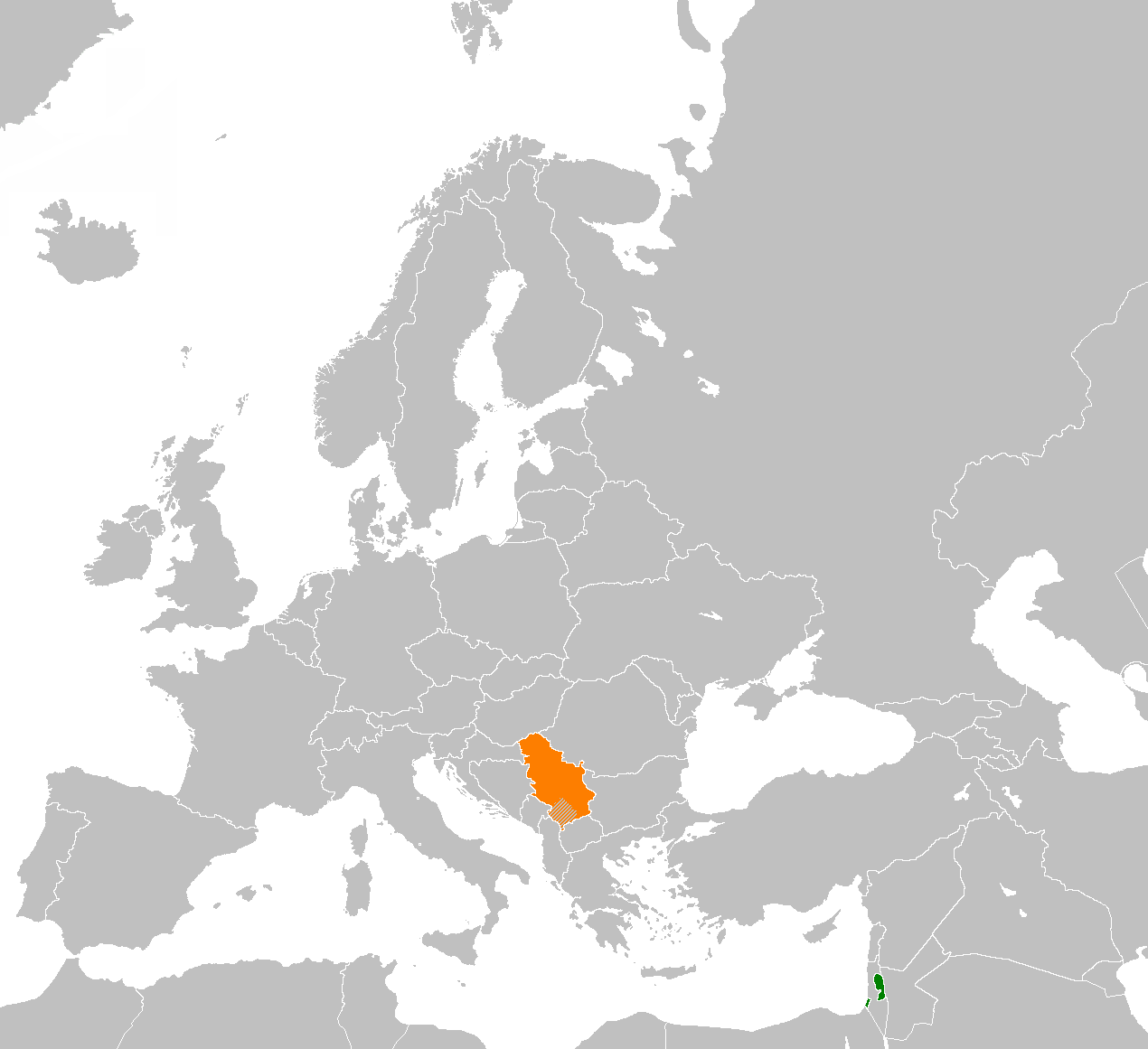

- Palestine: Serbia

Palestine and Serbia maintain diplomatic relations established between the Palestine and SFR Yugoslavia in 1989. From 1989 to 2006, Palestine maintained relations with the Socialist Federal Republic of Yugoslavia (SFRY) and the Federal Republic of Yugoslavia (FRY) (later Serbia and Montenegro), of which Serbia is considered shared (SFRY) or sole (FRY) legal successor.

== History ==
Yugoslavia under Josip Broz Tito had established diplomatic relations with Israel in 1948. After the Six-Day War in 1967, Yugoslavia had cut off all diplomatic relations with Israel and did not restore them until 1991. Tito had strongly supported Yasser Arafat and the Palestine Liberation Organization. Yasser Arafat was one of the dignitaries who had visited Belgrade after the death of Tito on 8 May 1980. Yugoslavia had recognized the State of Palestine in 1988 and had established full diplomatic relations with it in 1989. During the Yugoslav wars in the 1990s, Palestine had recognised the Federal Republic of Yugoslavia (then Serbia and Montenegro) and all the other former Yugoslav republics.

In late 1999, during a time when Serbia was increasingly isolated internationally for its actions in the Yugoslav Wars, the Palestinian Authority invited Serbian President Slobodan Milošević to celebrate Orthodox Christmas in the city of Bethlehem in the West Bank. An Israeli spokesman said that Milošević would probably be detained if he entered most countries, including Israel, as he had been indicted by the International Criminal Tribunal. Milošević did not ultimately attend the ceremonies.

Tomislav Nikolić, President of Serbia, visited Palestine at the invitation of President Abu Mazen in 2013.

President of Palestine Mahmoud Abbas visited Serbia accompanied by Riyad al-Maliki in 2015 and opened the embassy of Palestine in Belgrade, in the presence of the President of Serbia, Tomislav Nikolić. On that occasion, a memorandum of understanding was signed between the ministries of foreign affairs and was agreed to hold consultations on an annual basis, as well as the development of economic relations and the opening of cooperation programs in various sectors.

Serbian Foreign Minister Ivica Dačić visited the city of Bethlehem and met with Riyad al-Maliki in 2017.

A parliamentary Palestinian-Serbian Friendship Committee between the National Assembly of Serbia and the Palestinian National Council was formed in 2020. The Friendship Committee was formed by members of the Serbian Parliament representing the ruling coalition parties: the Serbian Progressive Party, the Socialist Party and the Social Democratic Party.

As part of the "World in Serbia" educational program, in the period 2009–2017 Serbia provided more than seventy scholarships for Palestine in various disciplines.

Serbia abstained from supporting seven successive UN General Assembly resolutions related to the Palestinian cause passed on 4 November 2020 shortly after the conclusion of the Kosovo–Serbia Economic Agreement in early September.

Serbia has voted in favor of Palestine on several occasions, including the UN General Assembly vote rejecting the United States' decision to move its embassy in Israel to Jerusalem.

=== Religious and cultural ties ===
In October 2026, the Serbian Orthodox Church voiced concern regarding the situation of Christians in Palestine, cautioning against attempts to diminish their long-standing historical presence. In a letter addressed to Ramzi Khouri, a member of the Executive Committee of the Palestine Liberation Organization and head of the Higher Presidential Committee for Church Affairs in Palestine, Serbian Patriarch Porfirije expressed solidarity with the Palestinian people and raised alarms over what the church characterized as "suffering, persecution and discrimination" faced by Christian communities. The church underscored that Christians have sustained a continuous presence in the region for over two millennia and remain an integral part of its history and heritage. It appealed for the safeguarding of Christian communities and for adherence to international law and religious rights. Porfirije stated that the church would continue to raise the protection of Christian communities and efforts for peace in the Middle East in meetings with political leaders and international institutions.

== Palestine's stance on Kosovo ==
Palestine is strongly against the independence of Kosovo. In February 2008, two senior Palestinian officials representing the Mahmoud Abbas West Bank-controlling government, who also are part of the team negotiating with Israel, disagreed on what the Kosovo events implied for Palestine. Yasser Abed Rabbo said, "If things are not going in the direction of continuous and serious negotiations, then we should take the step and announce our independence unilaterally. Kosovo is not better than us. We deserve independence even before Kosovo, and we ask for the backing of the United States and the European Union for our independence". Saeb Erekat responded that the Palestine Liberation Organization had already declared independence in 1988. "Now we need real independence, not a declaration," said Erekat, "We need real independence by ending the occupation. We are not Kosovo. We are under Israeli occupation and for independence we need to acquire independence".

After 2009 state visit to Serbia, President Mahmoud Abbas in a meeting with the Serbian President Boris Tadić, when discussing both the situations in the Middle East and Kosovo said, "We are looking for a way to resolve these problems in a peaceful way, by upholding international law. We cannot impose solutions nor can we accept imposed solutions. That is why we must negotiate". In September 2011, during the meeting of Foreign Ministers of the Non-Aligned Movement summit in Belgrade, the Palestinian Ambassador to the UN Riyad Mansour said that Palestine was a "typical foreign occupation which cannot be compared to the issue of Kosovo" as confirmed by international law and the UN.

In 2014 Palestinian Ambassador to Serbia Muhammad Nabhan said that "Kosovo has always been part of Serbia", that thus unlike Israel in the Palestinian territories, that Serbia has "never occupied Kosovo," and that "Palestinians support Serbia and still do".

== Serbia's stance on Gaza ==
During the 2008–2009 Gaza War, Foreign Minister Vuk Jeremić said "We are joining the voice of the whole world, which condemns the violence in Gaza, and we call for the stopping of missile attacks on Israel and Israeli attacks against the Gaza strip". Ministry of Foreign Affairs issued a statement saying "Ministry of Foreign Affairs of the Republic of Serbia condemns attacks in the Gaza Strip, and calls for calming of military actions in which guiltless civilians are killed. The Republic of Serbia welcomes the decision of the U.N. Security Council and joins in with the rest of the world in condemning the violence in the Middle East. Republic of Serbia is committed to a peaceful resolution of all conflicts, and calls on both sides to stop the attacks which cause a humanitarian catastrophe." President of the National Assembly Slavica Đukić Dejanović accepted a proposal of the Greek Parliament President for a regional conference aimed at ending the escalating violence in the Middle East. After the 2010 Gaza flotilla raid, the Serbian Ministry of Foreign Affairs condemned the excessive use of force which caused the deaths of innocent civilians. It also endorsed the UN Security Council's call for an immediate and impartial investigation into the incident.

At the 2010 summit of Balkan countries in Istanbul, Serbia was one of the countries that strongly condemned Israel's attack on the aid flotilla as well as the loss of life. In 2011, Serbia voted to recognize Palestine as UNESCO's 195th member, against Israel's wishes. Belgrade declared that it would not have opposed a resolution recognizing Palestinian sovereignty, had one come before the UN General Assembly. In 2012 Serbia voted in favor of United Nations General Assembly resolution 67/19, making Palestine a non-member UN observer state, like the Vatican.

During the 2014 Gaza War, Serbian Prime Minister Aleksandar Vučić stated that Serbia respected the right of the state of Israel to existence and a peaceful life of its citizens, and expressed hope that the situation would be resolved peacefully and that everyday life would return to normal.

During the Gaza war, Serbian President Aleksandar Vučić condemned the October 7 attacks. He stated that Serbia is against the killing of civilians and medical personnel and that both sides are friends and that Serbia will keep friendship with both of them.

Serbia sent humanitarian aid, including food, medicine equipment, water and tents. Serbian Minister of Internal and External Trade Tomislav Momirović stated that Serbia stands in solidarity with innocent people who are victims of a tragic conflict.

== See also ==
- Foreign relations of Palestine
- Foreign relations of Serbia
- Israel–Serbia relations
