= Croatia–Israel relations =

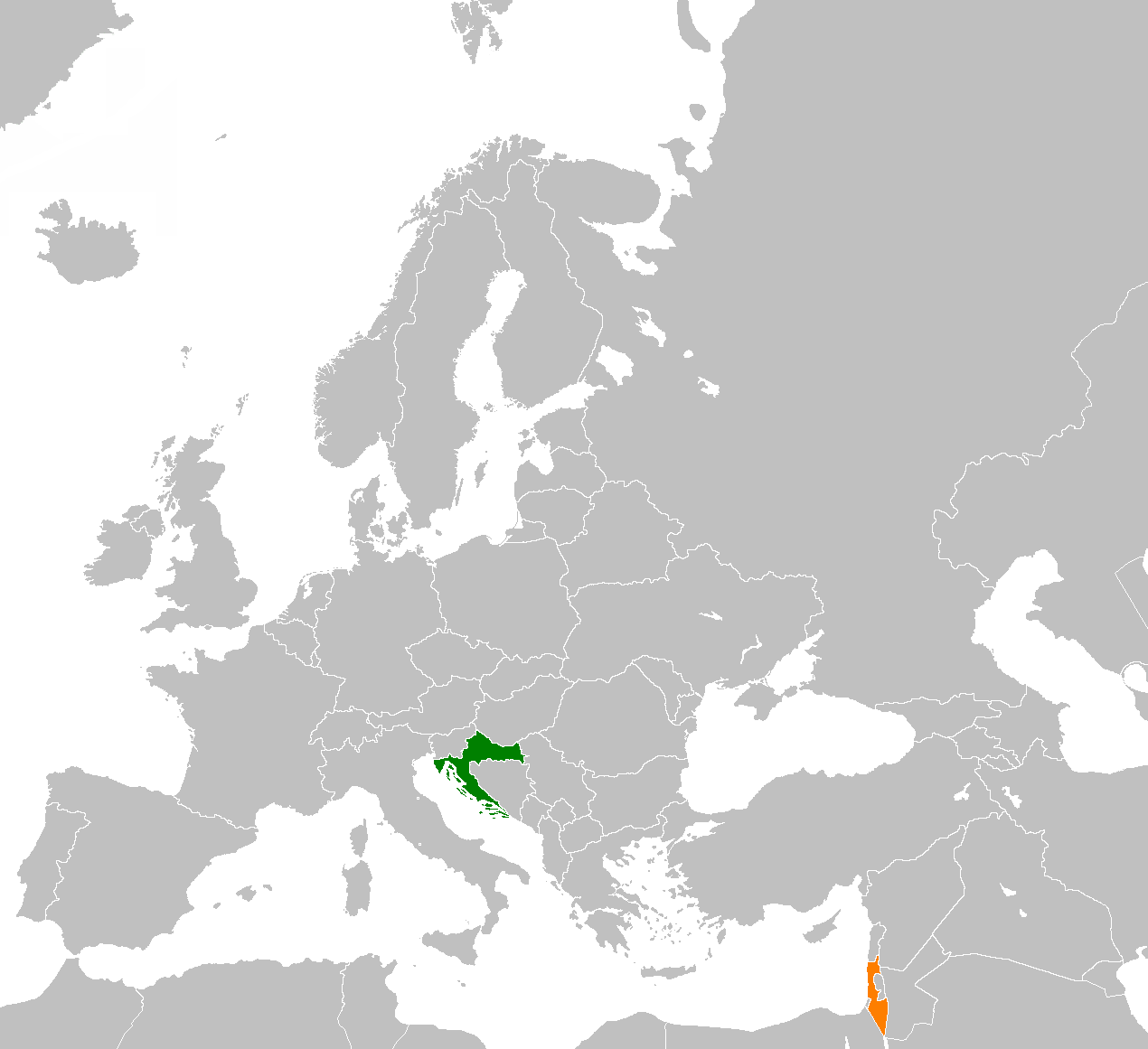

- Croatia: Israel

Diplomatic mission
- Croatian embassy in Tel Aviv: Israeli embassy in Zagreb

Full diplomatic relations between Croatia and Israel were established on April 9, 1997 following Croatia's independence from SFR Yugoslavia. Croatia has an embassy in Tel Aviv and honorary consulates in Ashdod, Caesarea, Jerusalem and Kfar Shmaryahu. Israel has an embassy in Zagreb. Relations between the two countries are described as friendly and highly cooperative. In recent years, Croatia and Israel have intensified bilateral relations and defence and security cooperation. Croatia is one of the countries Israel occasionally turns to within the EU to advocate on its behalf and it generally abstains or votes with Israel on key EU votes at the UN. Then Israeli president Reuven Rivlin described Croatia in 2019 as "Israel's strong ally in the EU, the UN and other multilateral organizations."

Both countries are members of United Nations, International Monetary Fund, World Bank, World Trade Organization, Union for the Mediterranean and many other international organisations.

== The Jewish community of Croatia ==
The Jewish community of Croatia dates back to at least the 3rd century, although little is known of the community until the 10th and 15th centuries. The community that had approximately 20,000 members until the beginning of World War II, many of whom have contributed to the development of the Croatian economy, science and culture throughout the states history, was almost completely destroyed during the Holocaust that took place on the territory of the Nazi-puppet state, the so-called Independent State of Croatia (NDH). Nevertheless, many Jews were given refuge during the war by the anti-Nazi resistance movement led by the marshal Josip Broz Tito, an ethnic Croat. 117 Croats were honoured with the title Righteous Among the Nations. After the War, half of the survivors chose to settle in Israel while an estimated 2,500 continued to live in Croatia.

Today there are 9 synagogues with Jewish organizations in Croatia; Zagreb (x2), Rijeka, Osijek, Split, Dubrovnik, Čakovec, Daruvar and Slavonski Brod. Zagreb Faculty of Humanities and Social Sciences's Chair of Judaism offers undergraduate and graduate programs in Jewish studies. Jews are officially recognized as a national minority by the Croatian Constitution and therefore have their own permanent seat in the Croatian Parliament.

=== Croatian Jews in Israel ===
Some people of Croatian Jewish descent make one of the smaller Yugoslav Jewish communities in Israel.

== Relations with SFR Yugoslavia ==
While Croatia was a member of the Yugoslav Federation (1943–1991) it established diplomatic relations with Israel in 1948 through the Federation. Until 1952, a total of 7,578 Jews emigrated from Yugoslavia to Israel in five emigration waves. At first, Yugoslavia was mostly neutral in the Arab–Israeli conflict but maintained ties with Israel. Following the 1948 Arab–Israeli War, Israel needed weaponry to defend itself. Czechoslovakia sold to Israel 50 Supermarine Spitfire Mk. IX fighter aircraft but it had a problem with their transfer. Faced with harsh Soviet pressure, Czechoslovakia and Israel arranged a transfer through Yugoslavia's Nikšić Airport (in Montenegro) and Port of Rijeka (in Croatia) in the top secret Operation Velvetta. This successful campaign lasted between 24 September 1948 and 5 January 1949. According to Israeli historian and war veteran Meir Pa'il, without Yugoslavia's assistance, Israel would probably not have won the war. Considering that Yugoslavia, which was stretched between the NATO and the Warsaw Pact during the Cold War, was a leader of the third bloc called Non-Aligned Movement and that President Tito maintained close relations with Arab leaders, especially Gamal Abdel Naser, since most Arab countries were members of the Movement, Yugoslavia severed all diplomatic relations with Israel in 1967 after Israel attacked Egypt in the Six-Day War. After Tito's death in May 1980 the separate Yugoslav republics slowly began to pursue their own foreign policies in relation to Israel, with Croatia choosing to pursue pro-Israeli policies.

== Relations during the Croatian War of Independence ==
After the breakup of Yugoslavia occurred as a result of a series of political upheavals and conflicts during the early 1990s, conservative politician President Franjo Tuđman rose to power in the newly independent Republic of Croatia on 8 October 1991. Israel has complained about the attitude that Tuđman presented in his book "The Wastelands of Historical Reality", more specifically in the chapter entitled "The history of the multiplication of war crimes and the creation of the Jasenovac and Bleiburg myth" in which he questioned the number of people killed in Jasenovac concentration camp considering that the number was from 30,000 to 40,000, unlike much higher figures presented by the Yugoslav authorities which emphasized a range between 350,000 and 800,000. The United States Holocaust Memorial Museum (USHMM) presently estimates that the Ustaša regime murdered between 77,000 and 99,000 people in Jasenovac between 1941 and 1945, out of which 12,000 to 20,000 were Jews. The Jasenovac Memorial Site quotes a similar figure of between 80,000 and 100,000 victims. Tuđman was also writing about the cooperation of some Jewish inmates with Nazi supervisors in Jasenovac, which he based on the memoirs written by the Croatian Communist Ante Ciliga who spent a year as a prisoner in Jasenovac.

Despite these disagreements Israel recognized Croatia as an independent state on April 16, 1992, but still refused to further develop bilateral cooperation.

=== Criticism of the Israeli policy toward Croatia ===
This Israeli policy has been heavily criticized by Igor Primoratz, a professor at the Department of Philosophy of the Hebrew University of Jerusalem. In his texts Israel and Genocide in Greece and Israel and the War in the Balkans he wrote: "Since the beginning of the disintegration of Yugoslavia, Israel’s political establishment has taken a pro-Serbian stand. Facts that Israel had an embassy in Belgrade since October 1991 and that Serbia was the first among Yugoslavia's successor states to open the embassy in Israel (though ambassador Budimir Košutić will never submit his credentials to the president of Israel due to the UN Security Council sanctions imposed on Belgrade) are just confirming that. Both Israeli public and the press itself as Yad Vashem refused to recognize crimes that Serbs committed in Croatia during the Croatian War of Independence", crimes that Croatia considers as the first case of genocide in Europe since the Holocaust.

=== Establishment of diplomatic relations ===
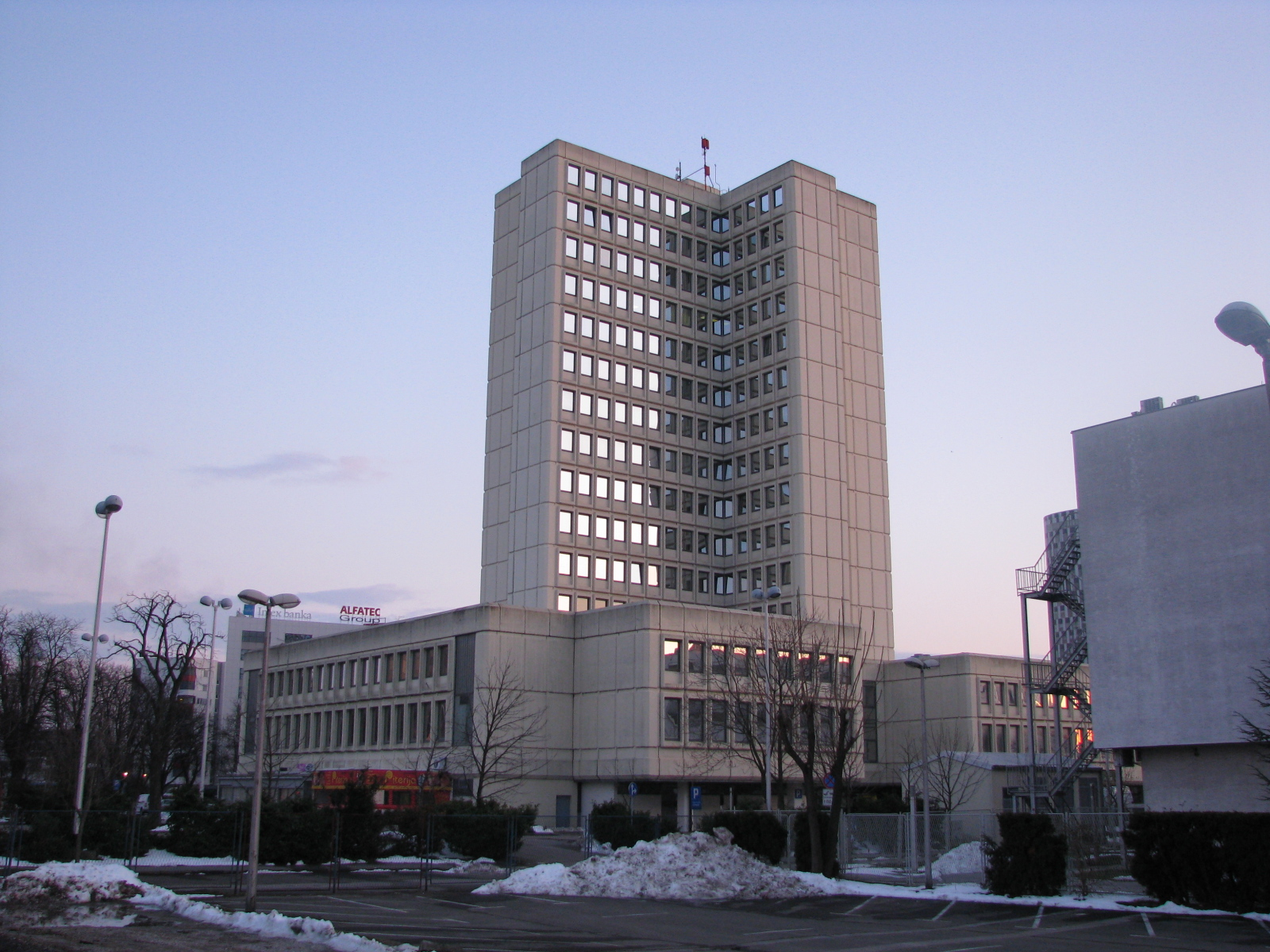
Israeli embassy in Chromos Tower, Zagreb

In September 1997, after several months of intense negotiations, Israel and Croatia published a joint statement on intention to establish diplomatic relations. Secret talks between the Israeli Foreign Ministry Director-General Eitan Bentsur, and the head of the office of the Croatian president Hrvoje Šarinić were held in Budapest. Full diplomatic relations among the two countries were established on September 4, 1997, after Croatian government issued a statement apologizing for the crimes committed by Ustaše in the NDH while President Tuđman promised to publish a modified version of his book. Croatia opened its embassy in Tel Aviv, while Israel was represented in Croatia through its embassy in Vienna until 2005.

President Tuđman sought to visit Israel but still has been rejected. The first senior Croatian official to visit Israel was Foreign Minister Mate Granić who made a state visit in May 1998 after Israeli prime minister Benjamin Netanyahu invited him. Although president Tuđman hoped to visit Israel in an official state visit he never got a chance to do so because of his sudden death in 1999.

Croatian producer Branko Lustig said on March 4, 2015, in an interview for the Slovenian television that he first met President Tuđman on Zagreb premiere of the film Schindler's List in 1994. He said that Tuđman grabbed his hand at one point while they were watching the movie and that he looked up to him and saw him crying. He said that he thought to himself: "Someone who is crying over the fate of these [Jewish] people cannot be a bad man."

Croatian historian Slavko Goldstein said in an interview for Jutarnji list that he asked for an audience with President Tuđman when he saw a film about Bruno Bušić that was pro-Ustasha intoned in the early 1990s. Goldstein said that Tuđman at one point during the meeting banged the table and shouted: "Slavko, as long as I'm here, the pro-Ustasha policy will not pass."

== Relations in 21st century and state visits ==
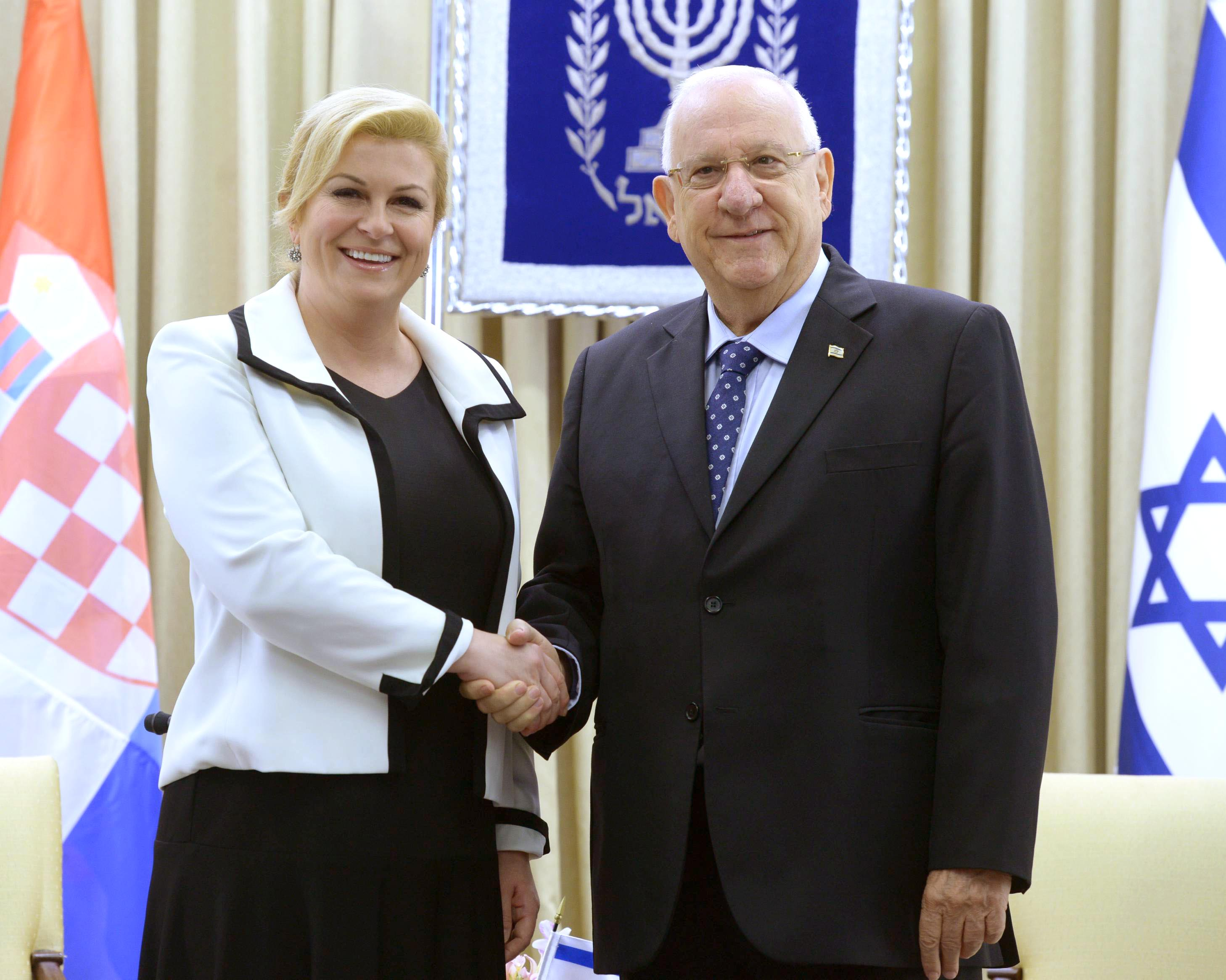
Croatian president Kolinda Grabar-Kitarović with Israeli president Reuven Rivlin during her official visit to Israel, July 2015

After the death of President Tuđman Israel began with active bilateral cooperation with Croatia so in February 2000 it sent a delegation to the inauguration of new Croatian president Stjepan Mesić.

In January 2001, the two countries mutually abolished visas while in October of the same year, president Mesić visited Israel and apologized for the Ustaše crimes against the Jewish people committed during the WWII. He visited Israel for the second time in October 2009.

First Israeli president that visited Croatia was Moshe Katsav who did so in July 2003. In his speech to the Croatian Parliament he said: "Israel appreciates Croatian Partisans and other Croatian freedom fighters who fought against fascism in Croatia during the Second World War. These fighters serve to honor to the Croatian people and are an important national value for the young generation." During his visit President Katsav met with the speaker of the Croatian Parliament Zlatko Tomčić, Croatian prime minister Ivica Račan and representatives of the Croatian Jewish Community. He also visited Dubrovnik and Memorial center in Jasenovac.

In March 2004, delegation of three Croatian ministers visited Israel; Foreign Minister Miomir Žužul, Minister of Science, Education and Sports Dragan Primorac and Minister of Agriculture Petar Čobanković.

On 8 September 2005, Israel opened its embassy in the Croatian capital of Zagreb. The first ambassador of Israel who dwelt in Zagreb was Shmuel Meirom. Since 2019, the Israeli ambassador to Croatia is Vesela Mrđen Korać.

On 15 February 2012, Croatian president Ivo Josipović visited Israel and apologized for the Ustaše crimes against the Jewish people committed during the WWII. He stated: "I stand before the Parliament of the State of Israel, and more importantly, I stand before the Croatian children, and without ambiguity, I apologize. Holocaust survivors and all the other victims I beg for your forgiveness."

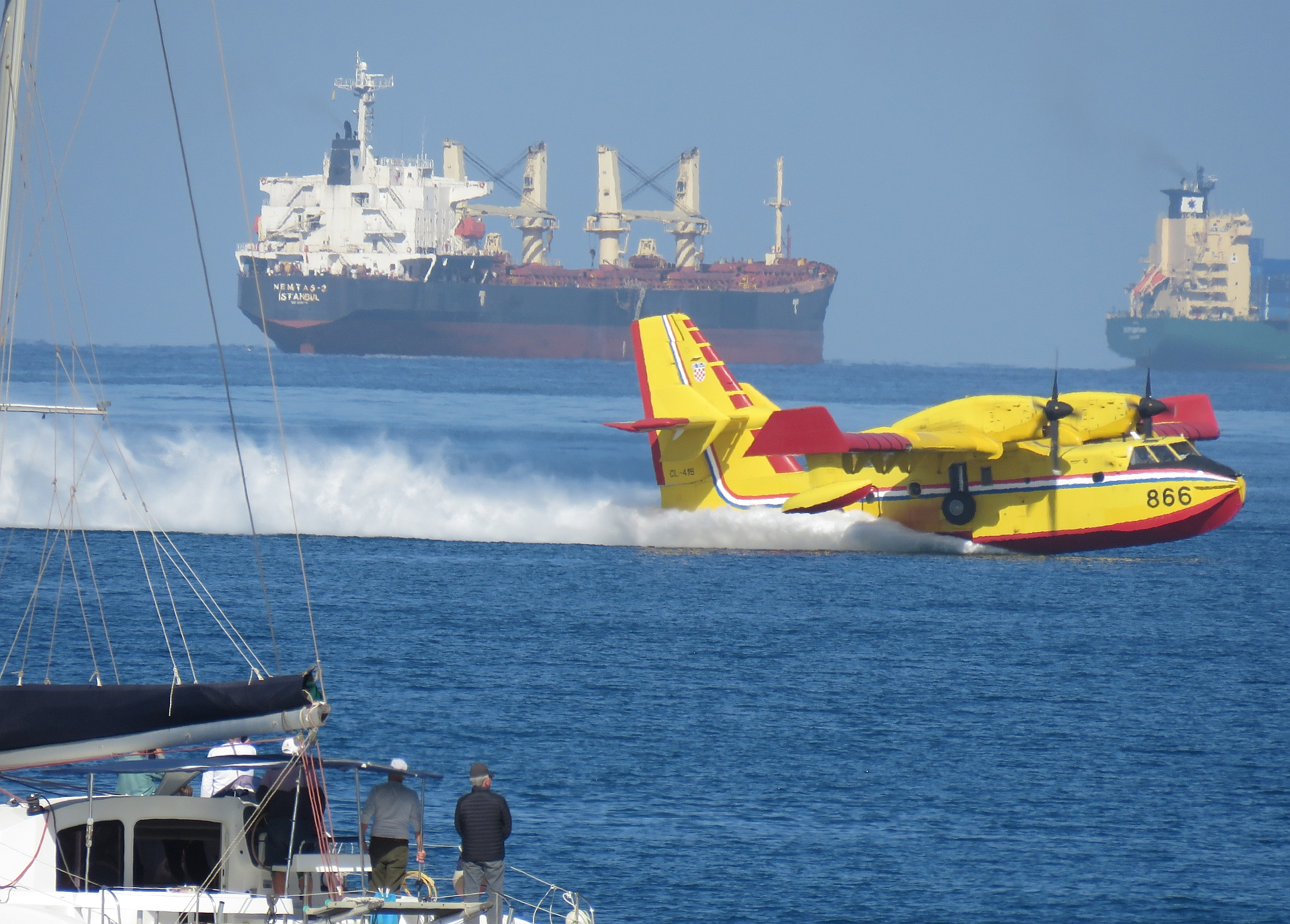
In November 2016, Croatian Air Force sent its Canadair CL-415 water bombers to help Israel in a fight against massive wildfires

On 22 July 2015, Croatian president Kolinda Grabar-Kitarović visited Israel. She stated in Yad Vashem: "As president of Croatia, I express my deepest regret to all the victims of the Holocaust that were killed by the hands of the collaborationist Ustasha regime during World War II. I deeply sympathize with your pain and suffering. The Ustasha regime most definitely was not a reflection of the true desire of the Croatian people for an independent state. Unfortunately, they have manipulated that desire. Croats must face with and accept its past because of the future. The vast majority of the Croatian people, including my grandparents, were part of the anti-fascist resistance movement, one of the proportionately largest resistance movements in occupied Europe during the World War II. I am grateful to those who put us [Croats] on the right side of history. Croatia is based on anti-fascism and the Croatian War of Independence." Croatian director Branko Lustig visited Israel with the president Grabar-Kitarović and gave an Oscar he won for the film Schindler's List as a gift to the Yad Vashem.

On 30 May 2016, Croatian foreign minister Miro Kovač visited Israel. In an interview for Jerusalem Post, Kovač condemned racism, anti-Semitism, and extremism and pointed out that Croatian constitution explicitly condemns fascism and guarantees protection for minorities and that there wasn't any public support for a BDS movement in Croatia. Kovač expressed Croatia's desire to upgrade cooperation with Israel in agriculture, water management, tourism, cyber and high technology, and praised excellent cooperation in areas of defense, security, and intelligence. When talking about compensation for properties seized from Jews by the Ustaše and the Communists, Kovač stated that Croatia supported the idea of creating a foundation which would be jointly managed by Croatia, the United States, and Israel, and which would work with Croatian Ministries of Public Administration and Justice to resolve the issue of property restitution. During his visit, Kovač met with Israeli prime minister Benjamin Netanyahu, representatives of the Jewish Council and the World Jewish Congress and visited Yad Vashem.

On 26 October 2016, UNESCO's World Heritage Committee passed a controversial resolution on Temple Mount which dismissed Israeli connections to the location. However, the resolution was passed with fewer than half the body's 21 members voting affirmative (10 for, 8 abstained, 2 against, 1 not present). At first, it was supposed to be passed unanimously, by consensus, because the UNESCO Secretary-General stated that if it was not passed unanimously, then it would not be implemented. Before the meeting opened, Palestinian Authority and Jordan wanted to present resolution text which would strengthen the Muslim claims to the Temple Mount, but after they were ensured that there was a consensus vote on the existing, softer version of the text, they submitted it, but when the meeting opened, Croatia and Tanzania called for a secret ballot which effectively blocked a unanimous by consensus vote. Israeli prime minister Benjamin Netanyahu thanked both Croatian and Tanzania for this move.

Croatia joined Cyprus, Greece, Italy, Russia and Turkey in fighting November 2016 Israel wildfires by sending its 2 Canadair CL-415 water bombers.

On 24 January 2017, Croatian prime minister Andrej Plenković visited Israel, marking the 20th anniversary of the establishment of diplomatic relations between Croatia and Israel. During the visit, Prime Minister Plenković met with Israeli president Reuven Rivlin, Prime Minister Benjamin Netanyahu and leader of the opposition Tzipi Livni. During their meeting, two prime ministers praised the significant progress of bilateral relations between two nations in the past years and signed a joint statement on the intention between the Croatian and Israeli governments on co-operation in the field of disaster prevention and emergency response.

On 25 March 2017, Croatian and Israeli Defense Ministers, Damir Krstičević and Avigdor Lieberman, have signed a Memorandum of Understanding in the Field of Defense which is to be used as a platform and a basis for advancing defense co-operation and bilateral relations between two nations. The Memorandum envisages co-operation in the military-technical area, exchange of experience in the field of military education, various forms of education and training, cybernetic abilities, and in the field of equipment and modernization of the armed forces.

On 25 January 2017, prime ministers' Plenković and Netanyahu held a meeting at Davos during their attendance at the World Economic Forum. Prime minister Plenković said that they primarily talked about the improvement of economic and political relations between their countries, especially "agriculture and Mediterranean cooperation." Croatia offered Israel shipbuilding services and cooperation in political multilateral forums and defense. Prime minister Netanyahu announced his visit to Croatia during 2018.

In March 2018, Croatia agreed to purchase 12 F-16 Fighting Falcon aircraft from Israel, but the agreement was cancelled in January 2019 because Israel failed to obtain the approval from the United States for the supply of the aircraft because the Trump administration saw Israel as an unfair competition in the tender, in which the US participated with Greece and Sweden.

On 10 September 2019, Croatian deputy prime minister Davor Božinović and the Israeli Minister of Public Security, Strategic Affairs and Information Gilad Erdan signed an agreement on cooperation in the field of public security which is expected to increase cooperation between countries' security agencies, notably in the field of cybersecurity.

Croatian-Israeli Society, founded on May 5, 1994, is a Croatian organization whose goal is "to promote friendly relations, cultural, scientific and any other cooperation between Croatia and Israel, and to cherish Jewish culture, traditions and heritage." Society is regularly funded by the Ministry of Foreign and European Affairs, Ministry of Culture and the Office for Education, Culture and Sports of the City of Zagreb. It has a few hundred members.

In 2026, Croatian President Zoran Milanović declined to approve the appointment of Israel’s new ambassador to Zagreb, citing objections to the policies of the Israeli government and tensions related to the Gaza war. The decision followed delays in the approval process and disagreements over the timing of the nominee’s public announcement. Croatian authorities said that ambassadorial appointments fall under the president’s constitutional authority, and the nominee was not formally approved.

== Economic relations ==
Economic cooperation between Croatia and Israel is good and increasing. In 2014, Croatia exported to Israel goods worth $33.3 million and imported from it goods worth $22.4 million. Israeli investors have invested hundreds of millions of dollars intro Croatia so far. Two main projects of Israeli investors are Project Teva-Pliva worth $200 million and Project golf park in Dubrovnik.

In 2011, 35,000 Israeli tourists visited Croatia. However, it is believed that the number is much higher because many Israelis don't use their Israeli passports for traveling, but rather the ones of another state whose citizenship they also hold. Croats are common pilgrims in Israel. In 2017, Croatia was visited by 56,952 Israelis who made 142,400 overnight stays.

Croatian Israeli Business Club is a Croatian organization whose main goal is enhancement and promotion of business relations between Croatia and Israel.

Croatia - Israel trade in millions USD-$
	Israel imports Croatia exports	Croatia imports Israel exports	Total trade value
2023	33	24.2	57.2
2022	40.5	37.8	78.3
2021	42.3	21.4	63.7
2020	33	20.4	53.4
2019	41.3	51.9	93.2
2018	26	22.9	48.9
2017	26.7	17.8	44.5
2016	18.4	25.9	44.3
2015	36.2	19.6	55.8
2014	31.2	21.5	52.7
2013	22.5	20.9	43.4
2012	8.5	30.1	38.6
2011	4.9	30.4	35.3
2010	7.1	21.8	28.9
2009	15.3	25.2	40.5
2008	5.9	23.2	29.1
2007	3.1	27.8	30.9
2006	4	12.1	16.1
2005	5.7	10.1	15.8
2004	5.4	15.6	21
2003	5.7	9.8	15.5
2002	3.2	8	11.2

== See also ==
- Foreign relations of Croatia
- Foreign relations of Israel
- Israel-EU relations
- History of the Jews in Croatia
- Israel–Russia relations
- Israel–Serbia relations
- List of ambassadors of Israel to Croatia
