= Israel–Montenegro relations =

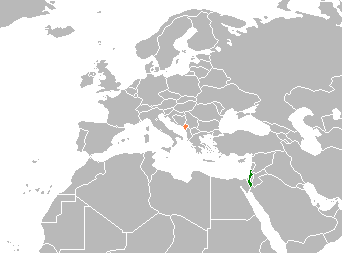

- Israel: Montenegro

Israel–Montenegro relations are the bilateral relations of Israel and Montenegro.

Israel recognized Montenegro on 13 June 2006 and established diplomatic relations on 12 July 2006. Both countries represent their countries by non-resident ambassadors.

Since 2006, Israel and Montenegro have an agreement on promotion and protection of investments which was signed during the Serbia and Montenegro.

In 2024, a Velvet monument was reveled in Nikšić, a monument which was donated by Israel in 2022 as a gratitude to the former Yugoslavia and Montenegro.

== High level visits ==
On July 4 and 5, 2018 the Director General of the Ministry of Foreign Affairs of Israel Yuven Rotem visited Montenegro, and on July 16 and 17, 2018 the former Minister of Foreign Affairs Srdjan Darmanović visited Israel. On March 27, 2019 the President of Montenegro Milo Đukanović visited Israel and meet with the President of Israel Reuven Rivlin. Milo Đukanović have also visited Israel as part of the Fifth World Holocaust Forum held in Jerusalem on January 22 and 23, 2020.

President of the Parliament of Montenegro Andrija Mandić officially visited Israel at the invitation of his colleague Speaker of the Knesset Amir Ohana. Apart from the meeting with Amir Ohana, Mandić met with the President of Israel Isaac Herzog. Minister of urbanism, spatial planning and state property Slaven Radunović and Mayor of Nikšić Marko Kovačević were also a part of President Mandić's delegation and met with their respective counterparts.

== Economic relations ==
For the period of January-October 2021, the trade between Israel and Montenegro amounted to 11,5 million euros, while in 2020 it amounted to 2.6 million euros, and at the same period of January-October 2021 investments from Israel amounted to EUR 1,08 million, while in 2020 they amounted to EUR 0.1 million, in 2019 2,8 million euros.

In 2019, Montenegro signed contract with the Israeli defense and technology company Elbit Systems in value of $35 million, and in 2023 another deal with Elbit Systems in value of $22 million.

== Tourism ==
For the period of January-October 2021, 17,496 Israelis visited Montenegro, spending 49,646 nights. While in 2020, 558 Israelis visited Montenegro. In 2019, 40,764 Israelis visited Montenegro, who spent 111,978 nights.

== Jewish community ==
The Jewish community of Montenegro numbered about 500 Jews in 2023. In 2024 construction of a new and first Synagogue began in Podgorica.

== Resident diplomatic missions ==
- Israel is accredited to Montenegro from its embassy in Belgrade, Serbia.
- Montenegro has a honorary consulate in Tel Aviv.

== See also ==
- Foreign relations of Israel
- Foreign relations of Montenegro
- History of the Jews in Montenegro
- Israel–Yugoslavia relations
