= Israel–Kosovo relations =

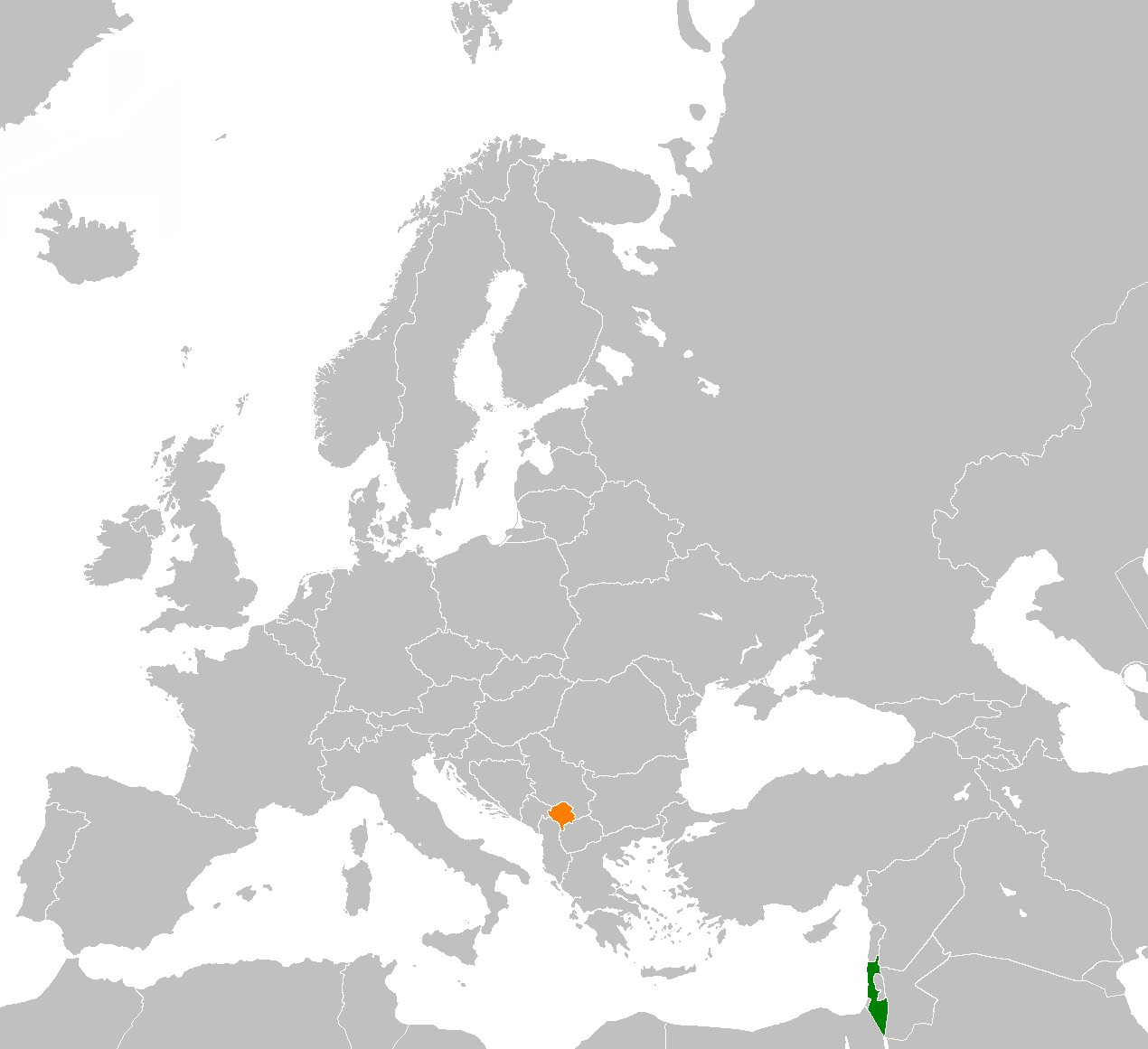
- Israel: Kosovo

Diplomatic mission
- Embassy of Israel, Pristina: Embassy of Kosovo, Jerusalem

Envoy
- Ambassador Tamar Ziv: Ambassador Ines Demiri

Israel–Kosovo relations refer to bilateral relations between Israel and Kosovo. Kosovo declared its independence from Serbia on 17 February 2008. Israel and Kosovo agreed on 4 September 2020, as part of negotiations for the Kosovo and Serbia Economic Normalization agreements, to mutually recognize each other. It was initially reported that the mutual recognition had not yet gone into effect at that point, and Israel's recognition of Kosovo was expected to be formally declared "in the coming weeks". However, on 21 September 2020, the ambassador of Israel to Serbia, Yahel Vilan, confirmed that Israel had indeed recognized Kosovo on 4 September 2020. The two countries established diplomatic relations on 1 February 2021. On 14 March 2021, Kosovo officially opened its embassy in Jerusalem.

== History ==
Israel was initially hesitant to recognize Kosovo's independence. An Israeli Foreign Ministry official quoted by The Jerusalem Post said in February 2008: "We haven't decided when we're going to decide, and instead will monitor events and consider the issue."

According to the Jewish Chronicle, Foreign Ministry officials and politicians were privately voicing a general sympathy towards the Kosovar cause, however, Israel would still not recognize Kosovo. Knesset member Ruhama Avraham Balila said in February 2008 that "at present the government of Israel has made [the] decision not to join the group of countries which recognised the independence of Kosovo." She also said that Israel considers the situation "very disturbing."

On 28 April 2009, Arthur Koll, the Israeli ambassador to Serbia, said that though it had been more than a year since Kosovo unilaterally declared independence, Israel had no intention of recognizing the declaration, and that "Israel is asked from time to time how solid this decision is, but the fact is that Israel's position has not changed throughout this time. The Serbian people and government should appreciate Israel's position, which also demonstrates the friendship between the two states."

On 16 September 2009, Israeli foreign minister Avigdor Lieberman said that Israel is "monitoring the situation between Serbia and Kosovo" and that Israel hopes for "a really comprehensive and peaceful solution" which would be established through negotiations between the two involved states. Lieberman also said that Israel would be able to withstand pressure to recognize Kosovo because Israel has "been under pressure since 1948 on many issues and we know how to deal with any pressure." During a visit to Israel in late October 2009, Serbian Interior Minister Ivica Dačić, said that "Israeli officials have confirmed that Israel will remain firm in its stand [on Kosovo]."

In June 2011, Lieberman said that Kosovo's independence is a "sensitive issue" and that Israel may recognize Kosovo after other countries like Greece and Spain accept it.

In 2011, Serbia voted to recognize Palestine as UNESCO's 195th member, against Israel's wishes. Belgrade declared that it would not have opposed a resolution recognizing Palestinian sovereignty, had one come before the UN General Assembly.

On 4 September 2020, the State of Israel and the Republic of Kosovo agreed to establish formal diplomatic relations. The document signed by Kosovo stated that it and Israel will recognize each other. Some media reports suggested that Israel's recognition of Kosovo was not yet in effect and would be formally declared "in the coming weeks". However, on 21 September the ambassador of Israel to Serbia, Yahel Vilan, confirmed that Israel had in fact actually recognized Kosovo on 4 September 2020 saying "There is no doubt whether Israel will recognize Kosovo or not, because Israel already recognized Kosovo on 4 September". In addition, Prime Minister Benjamin Netanyahu mentioned that "Kosovo will be the first country with a Muslim majority to open an embassy in Jerusalem". Israel and Kosovo established formal diplomatic relations on 1 February 2021. On 14 March 2021, Kosovo opened its embassy in downtown West Jerusalem, although without a ceremony marking the event due to COVID-19 restrictions in Israel. Kosovo became the first Muslim-majority territory to recognise Jerusalem as Israel's capital.

On 18 June 2024, the State of Israel and the Republic of Kosovo signed a visa-exemption agreement for holders of national passports for tourism visits or short stays not exceeding 90 days within six months. Kosovar Foreign Minister Donika Gërvalla-Schwarz called the signing of the agreement "a new chapter in promoting our country" in how it would strengthen their economic and educational development, and anticipated future joint activities and programs with Israel.

== See also ==
- Foreign relations of Israel
- Foreign relations of Kosovo
- International recognition of Israel
- International recognition of Kosovo
- Israel–Serbia relations
- Israel–Yugoslavia relations
