= Bosnia and Herzegovina–Israel relations =

- Bosnia and Herzegovina: Israel

Bosnia and Herzegovina–Israel relations are the bilateral relations between Bosnia and Herzegovina and Israel.

Bosnia and Herzegovina, and Israel established relations on 26 September 1997. Bosnia and Herzegovina has an embassy in Tel Aviv which serves both Israel and Cyprus. The Israeli embassy in Tirana, Albania serves also Bosnia and Herzegovina.

== History ==
=== Early relations ===
During the Yugoslav Wars, Israel took 84 Muslim refugees from Bosnia, and Israel together with Jordan have operated a joined aid mission to Bosnia. Bosnia and Herzegovina decided first to recognize and to establish relations with the Palestinians in 1992, as Bosnia and Herzegovina, and Israel have established relations on 26 September 1997.

=== Relations from 2000 ===
In 2013, Israel extradited Alexander Cvetkovic to Bosnia and Herzegovina. Cvetkovic an Israeli-Serb who immigrated from Bosnia to Israel in 2005, was indicted by Israeli courts in 2011 for allegedly participating in the July 1995 massacre of Srebrenica. In 2017 Bosnia and Herzegovina's Serb President Mladen Ivanić visited Israel and met with the Israeli Prime Minister Benjamin Netanyahu. In 2022, Bosnia and Herzegovina's Prime Minister Borjana Krišto was the first Prime Minister to visit Israel and even wished to see the embassy of Bosnia and Herzegovina in Jerusalem. In 2023 the Israeli Prime Minister Benjamin Netanyahu visited Bosnia and Herzegovina as part of the International Economy Fair Mostar.

== Economic relations ==
In 2020, the Israel Aerospace Industries (IAI) opened a cyber academy in Bosnia and Herzegovina as part of the vision to increase the country's cyber capabilities through international collaborations, leveraging new technologies, infrastructure development, and research. In 2024 Israel increased the import of aluminum from Bosnia and Herzegovina, while reducing import from Turkey and other “unfriendly” countries.

== Political Relations ==
In 2017, the Israeli Foreign Ministry criticized the naming of a school in Bosnia and Herzegovina for a Muslim Nazi collaborator, Mustafa Busuladzic. In 2020, a Catholic cardinal honored in a service the soldiers of the Nazi-allied Ustasha. The local Jewish community and Israel criticized the event, and thousands demonstrated in Sarajevo against as well.

After the attack of 7 October in 2023, many Muslims in Bosnia and Herzegovina protested against Israel from the early stages of the war, and supported by the mayor of Sarajevo, Benjamina Karic. In September 2024, 200 fans of Bosnia and Herzegovina's national team have marched in the Jewish quarter of Budapest while calling pro-Palestinian calls.

== Jewish community ==
The Jewish community in Bosnia and Herzegovina is estimated between 500 and 1,000 Jews living in Sarajevo, Banja Luka, Mostar, Tuzla, Doboj, and Zenica. The Jewish Community of Bosnia Herzegovina have a Jewish museum in Sarajevo. In 2024 a Jewish-Muslim Initiative for Peace meet on the International Holocaust Remembrance Day in Srebrenica and commemorated the Israeli victims of 7 October and the Palestinian victims of war.

== Israel-Republic of Srpska relations ==
Republic of Srpska have representative office in Israel located in Jerusalem, mostly focusing on economic and cultural relations.

In 2011, Nebojsa Radmanovic vetoed and blocked Bosnia and Herzegovina from voting in favor of the Palestinian Authority. In 2012, Milorad Dodik visited Israel. In 2023, Israel's 75th Independence Day were celebrated and patronized by Milorad Dodik in the administrative center of Republika Srpska, Banja Luka.

On 3 September 2026, an Israeli Chamber of Commerce representative office opened in Banja Luka to expand trade and technological ties between Republic of Srpska and Israel.

== See also ==
- Foreign relations of Israel
- Foreign relations of Bosnia and Herzegovina
- History of the Jews in Bosnia and Herzegovina
- Israel–Yugoslavia relations
