= November 2016 Israel fires =

Series of fires in Israel in November 2016

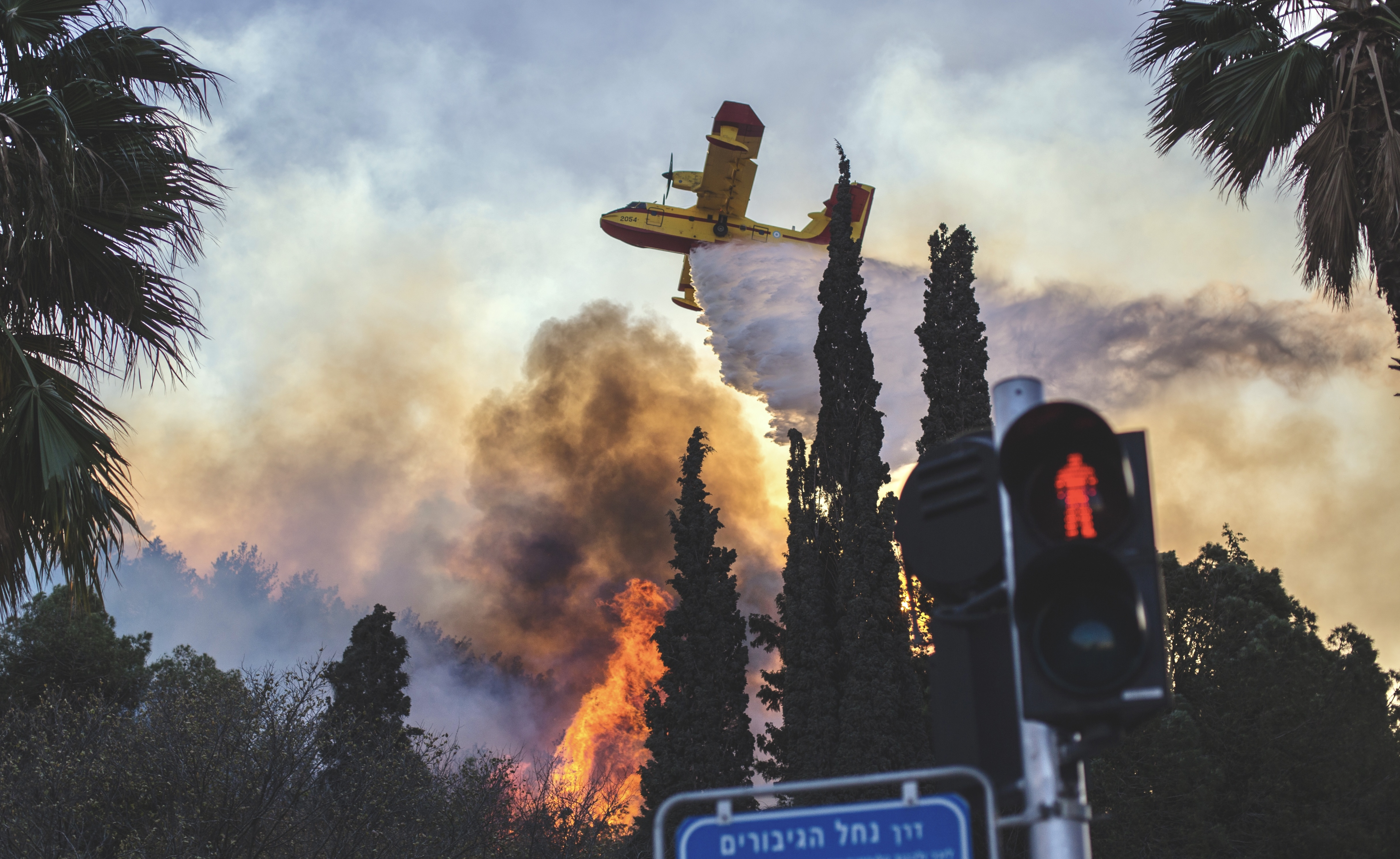
- CL-415 aircraft of the Hellenic Air Force helping in the fight against the fires in Haifa.
- Date: 22–27 November 2016
- Location: Various regions in Israel, mainly in Haifa, Judaean Mountains and the Sharon Plain.
- Coordinates: 32.772082°N 35.018761°E

Statistics
- Burned area: 30,000–41,000 dunams (30–41 km^{2}; 12–16 sq mi)
- Land use: Residential; Open space

Impacts
- Injuries: 180+ civilians
- Structures destroyed: 575+ homes; 1 commercial property
- Cost: ₪500,000,000

Ignition
- Cause: Arson, negligence, weather conditions

Map
- Location within Haifa region of Israel

In November 2016, a wave of wildfires and urban fires occurred in Israel from Beersheva in the south to Nahariya in the north. Some of the fires occurred naturally; others were arson attacks. On November 28, after eight days of fire fighting, the firefighting services announced that the emergency condition was over. Firefighters fought 1,773 fires, at least 39 were reported as major fires that required at least ten crews or more. The largest fire occurred in Haifa, where 527 apartments were destroyed among 77 buildings, leaving 1,600 people homeless. Some 75,000 residents, about a quarter of the city's population, were evacuated from eleven neighborhoods. Other major fires occurred in Zikhron Ya'akov and in the Jerusalem area, as well as smaller fires throughout Israel and the West Bank. Israel's Nature and Parks Authority reported that more than 20,000 dunams (4,900 acres) of forests, brush land, and open space were burnt, the largest amount since the 2010 Mount Carmel forest fire.

While most of the fires were caused by weather conditions and negligence, some of the fires were caused by arsonists suspected of being nationally motivated Arabs. Two Arab citizens of Israel confessed they deliberately set fires. At least 35 people were arrested on suspicion of setting fires or inciting to do so. More than 15 were citizens of the Palestinian Authority and at least 10 were Arab citizens of Israel. Officials in Israel have stated that the deliberate setting of fires is a form of terrorism. As of November 28, at least 25 fires were suspected to have been caused by arson.

On January 13, 2017, the Israeli fire investigation's "Gal Report" found that of 80 fires, 71 resulted from arson. On April 4, 2017, the head of the Israeli fire investigation unit declared: "The fires were acts of terrorism committed by members of the Arab population against the Jewish population. Ninety percent of the fires were caused by arson."

== Background ==
The fires came after two months of drought in the area. Regions of Jerusalem and the West Bank were also affected. Officials identify "extreme weather", including high temperatures and dry winds, as helping fires spread.

== Fires ==
=== Haifa ===
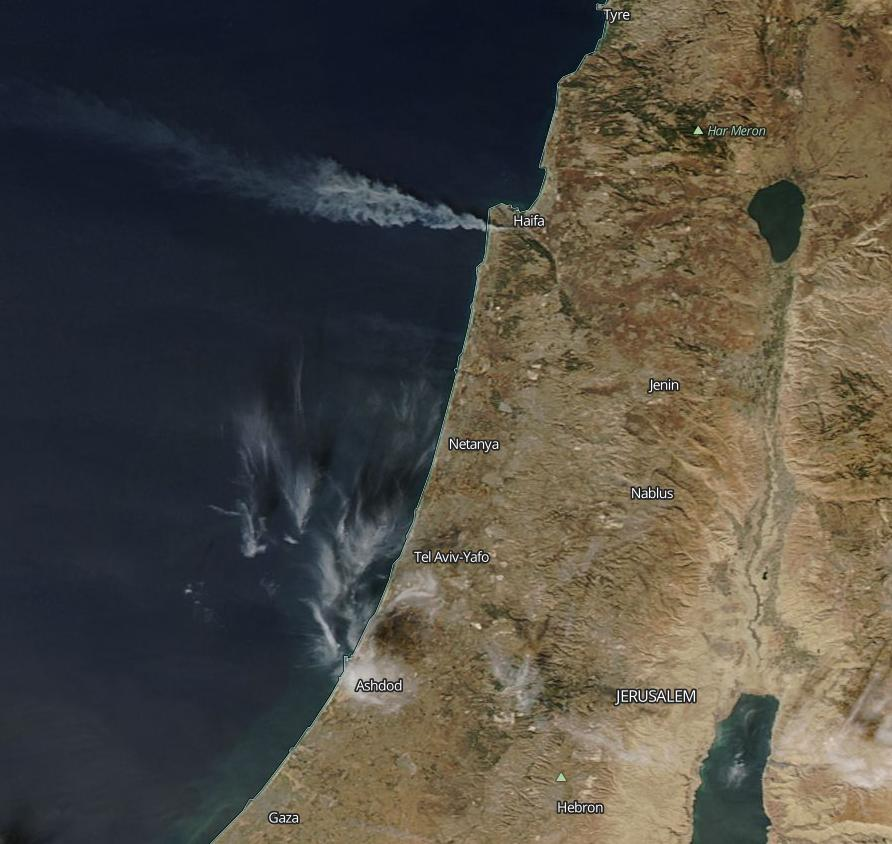
Fires in Haifa as seen from space on 24 November 2016

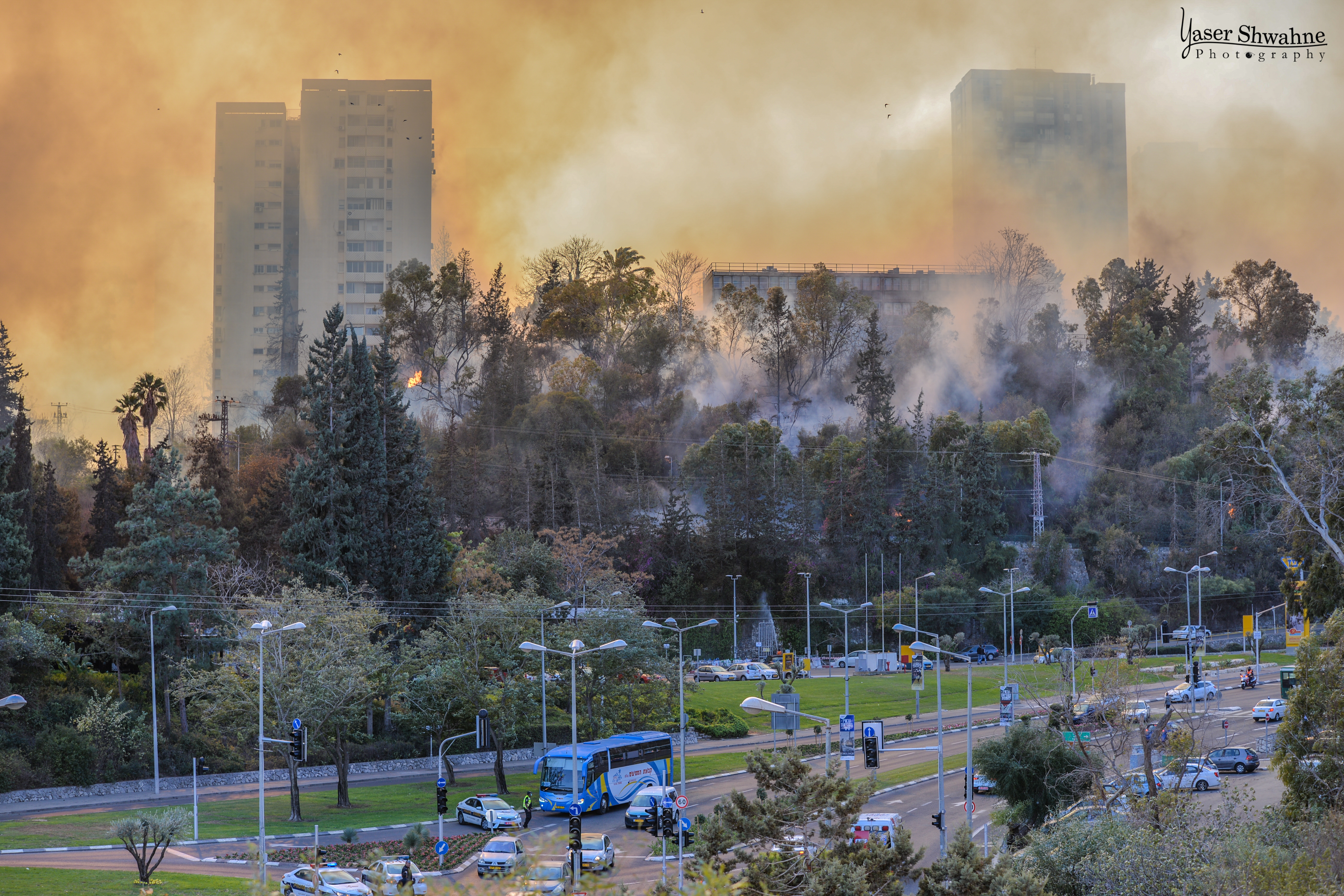
Great fire in Haifa, 24 November 2016

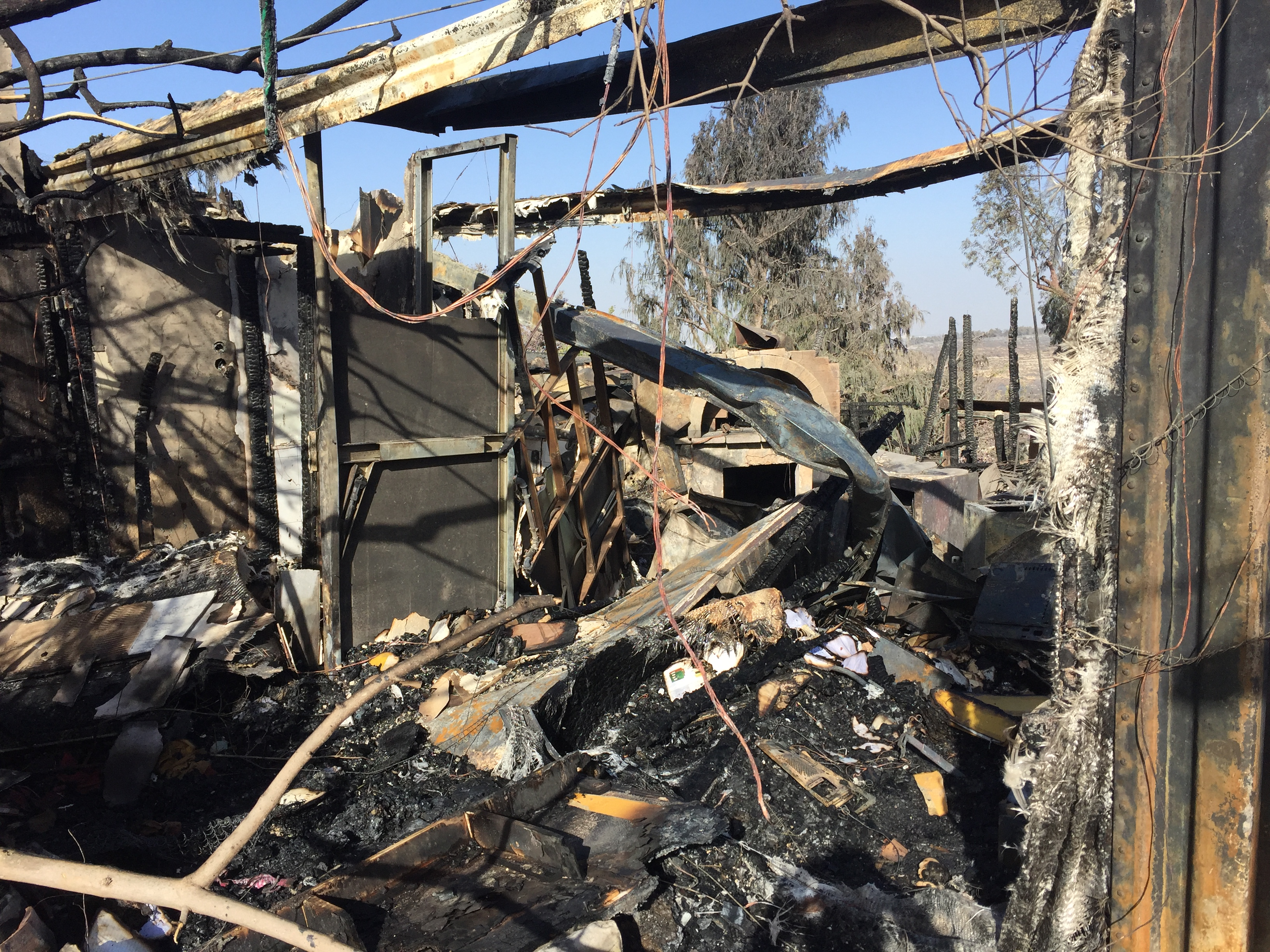
Burnt restaurant in Nataf, 25 November 2016.

Fires in Haifa occurred in dozens of areas and consumed buildings in five locations. Some 75,000 residents of 11 neighborhoods were evacuated by firefighters and the search and rescue Kedem Battalion of the Home Front Command. Two schools were evacuated: Fichman School and Reali (Beit Biram), while there was a fire burning inside Beit Biram itself. At 17:08 (ISTׁ) it was reported that 163 people were injured including three children and a 6-month-old baby, mainly from smoke inhalation. One woman was moderately injured. 350 firefighters and 115 firefighting vehicles operated in the city. Three residents were detained by police forces under suspicion of arson after being spotted near one of the epicenters. The fire calmed down in the night between November 24 and 25 and residents were allowed to return home in the afternoon of November 25 while fires were still raging outside the city.

The estimated cost of damages from the fire in Haifa was 500 million New Israeli Shekels.

=== Zikhron Ya'akov ===
The fires in Zikhron Ya'akov started on November 22 in the Givat Eden neighborhood in the northern part of the town as a result of arson. Eight people, including two children and a 10-day-old infant were treated for smoke inhalation. Thirty homes were burnt and at least ten homes were destroyed. Several roads were closed, including Highway 4 and Highway 70. Residents of Givat Eden and the surrounding areas were told to shut their gas lines and were evacuated. Residents were allowed to return after 29 hours of fighting, except those whose houses were damaged by the fire. Public Security Minister Gilad Erdan said evidence was found indicating that the initial fire was the result of arson involving gasoline.

=== Judaean mountains ===
Two fires erupted near Nataf. The first occurred on November 23 when a small fire lit by road workers to make coffee quickly spread through the wadi between Har Haruah and Har Rafid, one kilometer east of Nataf. The residents of Nataf were evacuated to the nearby community of Yad Hashmona. The fire burned one house completely and caused damage to several others. Two days later, a second fire started in Wadi Kefira below Kibbutz Ma'aleh Hahamisha and quickly spread westward. It burnt the restaurant, Rama's Kitchen and 25,000 dunams (6,200 acres) in the Kefira nature reserve that surrounds Nataf. Residents were again evacuated and sheltered in the community center of the neighboring Arab village, Abu Ghosh. Firefighters from the Palestinian Authority joined the local residents and the Israel Fire and Rescue Services. A fire-fighting super tanker from the USA joined the fight by spraying water over the burning area. After the second fire, remains of Molotov cocktails were found near the separation barrier and a Palestinian from the West Bank was arrested on suspicion of arson.

On November 25, a fire erupted around 02:00 (IST) next to Beit Meir. The residents, including 300 people who were staying at the guest house, were evacuated, mostly to the nearby community of Shoresh. Some houses were damaged. Twenty-five firefighting crews extinguished the flames shortly before 05:30. The police conducted search operations to find the cause of the fire. Residents reported they saw several people fleeing the area after the fire began to spread.

=== Halamish ===
Fires erupted on the eve of November 25 and consumed large parts of Halamish and the surrounding forest. About 40 houses were set ablaze, of which 15 were burnt to the ground. The fire was the result of arson by Palestinians and was denounced by Israeli ministers as "terrorism of fire".

=== Other fires ===
- Ein Tamar – fire erupted in a thorn field near the moshav. Four firefighting crews were sent.
- Dvir – fire erupted at the Dvira forest near the kibbutz.
- Lakhish – fire erupted in the Lakhish forest near the moshav.
- Kiryat Gat – fires erupted at two points near the Kiryat Gat intersection in the morning of November 25. The main road in the city was closed and trains were canceled.
- Dolev – The first fire in the Israeli settlement of Dolev in the West Bank started on November 22 and damaged three caravans in the northernmost neighborhood. Twenty homes were temporarily evacuated as 68 firefighters, assisted by volunteers, worked to extinguish the fire over night. Investigation revealed that the fire was caused by arson.
- Talmon – the first fire in Talmon started on November 23 and several neighborhoods were evacuated.
- Gilon – fires started on November 22 and caused 80 residents to be evacuated. Three houses were damaged and electricity was temporarily cut. The fire was brought under control after several hours.
- Kabul and Tamra – fire erupted between the two Arab towns in northern Israel during the night of November 24.
- Har Halutz – fire erupted near the communal settlement on November 24 and was extinguished in the early morning hours of November 25. The entire community was evacuated during the fire and six houses were damaged.
- Iksal and Nazareth Illit – fire erupted between the Arab town and the mixed city on November 24.
- Ka'abiyye – fire erupted near the Arab town. Five houses were evacuated in a precautionary step.
- Ya'ad – fire erupted near the moshav on November 25. Residents of 15 houses were evacuated until the fires were extinguished in the afternoon.
- Geulim – fire erupted near the moshav on November 25 causing no damage.
- Binyamina – fire erupted next to the town. One man in his forties was injured by smoke inhalation.
- Harashim – fire erupted in the communal settlement on November 25 and was extinguished on November 26. Residents of the southern part of Harashim were evacuated during the fire.
- Daliyat al-Karmel – fire erupted in the Druze town on November 25 and was extinguished by six firefighter crews.

== Arson ==
Initially, some of the fires were suspected to have been caused by arsonists. The Israel Police commissioner Roni Alsheikh and the Israel Security Agency announced that the arsons were "likely nationalistically motivated" and that suspects were arrested.

Gilad Erdan, Israel's public security minister, told Army Radio that the professional assessment was that almost half the fires were the result of arson. Prime Minister Benjamin Netanyahu attributed the fires to "natural and unnatural" causes and said that "any fire caused by arson or incitement to arson is terrorism in every sense of the word, and we will treat it as such."

== Investigation ==
Following the fires, the Israeli fire investigation unit began investigating the events.

On November 30, early investigation led to the statement that most of the fires were arson attacks. According to the head of the fire investigation unit "at first, the number of suspected arson fires was the same as the number of natural fires. But as time went by, reports began arriving that many of the fires were the result of arson." In a later report In April 2017, the head of the investigation unit reported that 90% of the fires were caused by arson and that the fires were acts of terrorism.

== Firefighting ==
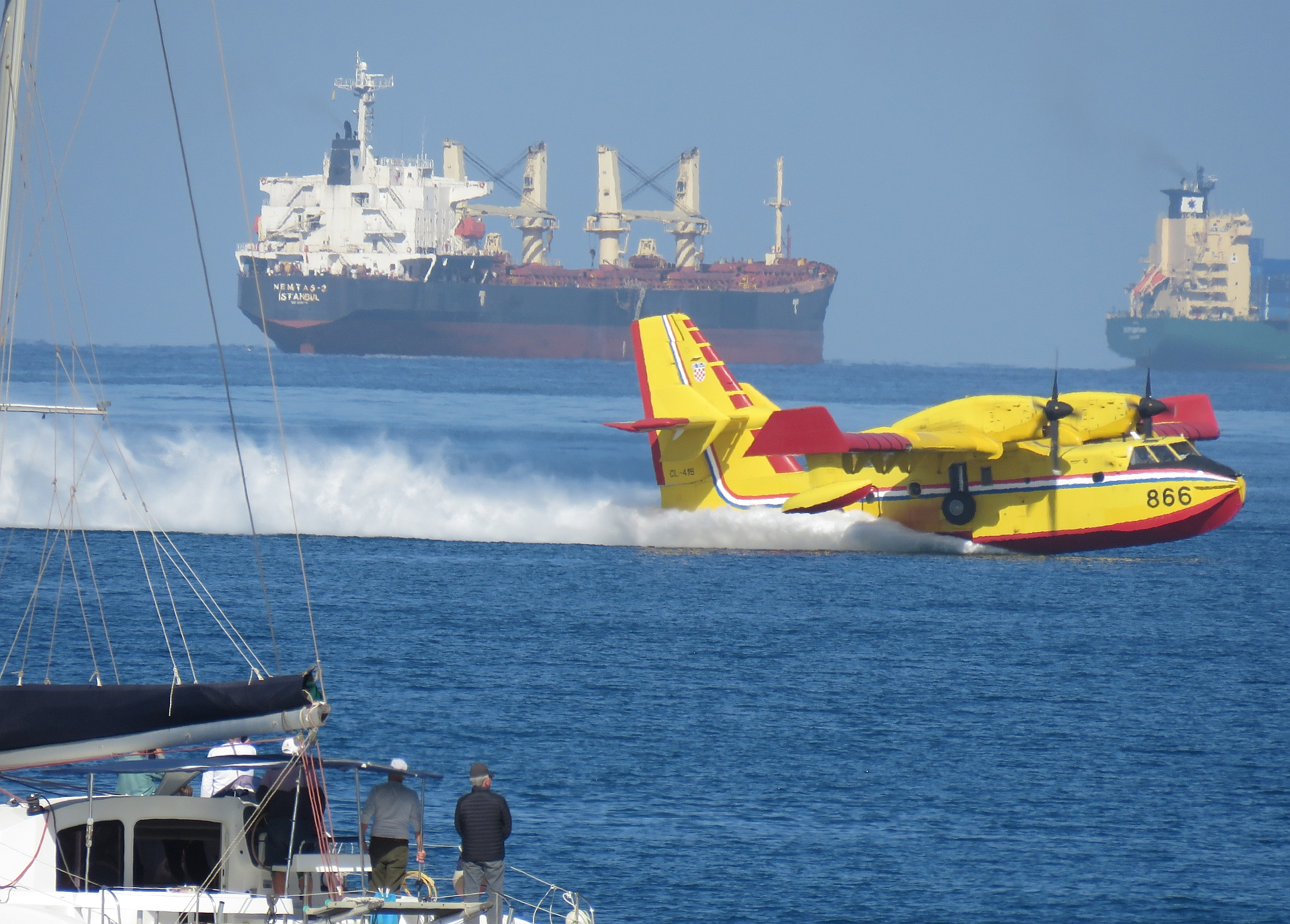
Croatian Air Force CL-415 refills it tanks with seawater to fight the wildfires in Israel, 26 November 2016

Cyprus, Greece, Russia, Croatia, Italy, Turkey, Jordan, Egypt, Azerbaijan, France, and Ukraine sent aircraft and other equipment to help fight the fires. Israel's Home Front Command called in soldiers and rescuers to aid with the effort. Netanyahu asked for "Super Tanker" aircraft from the USA. The Palestinian Authority sent eight firefighting crews, four to the Haifa area and four to the Jerusalem area. Spain sent four planes (CL-215T and CL-415) to help fight the fires.

Croatia sent two CL-415 with four crews (to ensure non-stop turnaround) on November 23, immediately after receiving Israel's request.

Cyprus sent 69 men: 28 firemen, 24 rescuers of the Civil Defense, and 17 forest firefighters.

Greece sent three firefighter planes (CL-415, a C-130) with 18 airmen, 14 technicians, and operation support supplies, on November 23, immediately after receiving Israel's request.

== Insurance and restoration ==
In Israel, private insurance companies do not compensate damages considered to be acts of hostile acts such as war and terrorism. Hence, people who lost property were unable to make insurance claims and receive money to repair and rebuild their properties.

On November 30, 2016, Israeli Insurance companies and the Israel Ministry of Finance came to an agreement whereby the government will fund 90% of the insured victims.

The Israeli tax authority had published a list of settlements that will receive funds for rebuilding the lost property where they are considering the fires being an act of aggression.

== See also ==
- Palestinian airborne arson attacks
