= History of the Jews in Montenegro =

The location of Montenegro (dark green) in Europe

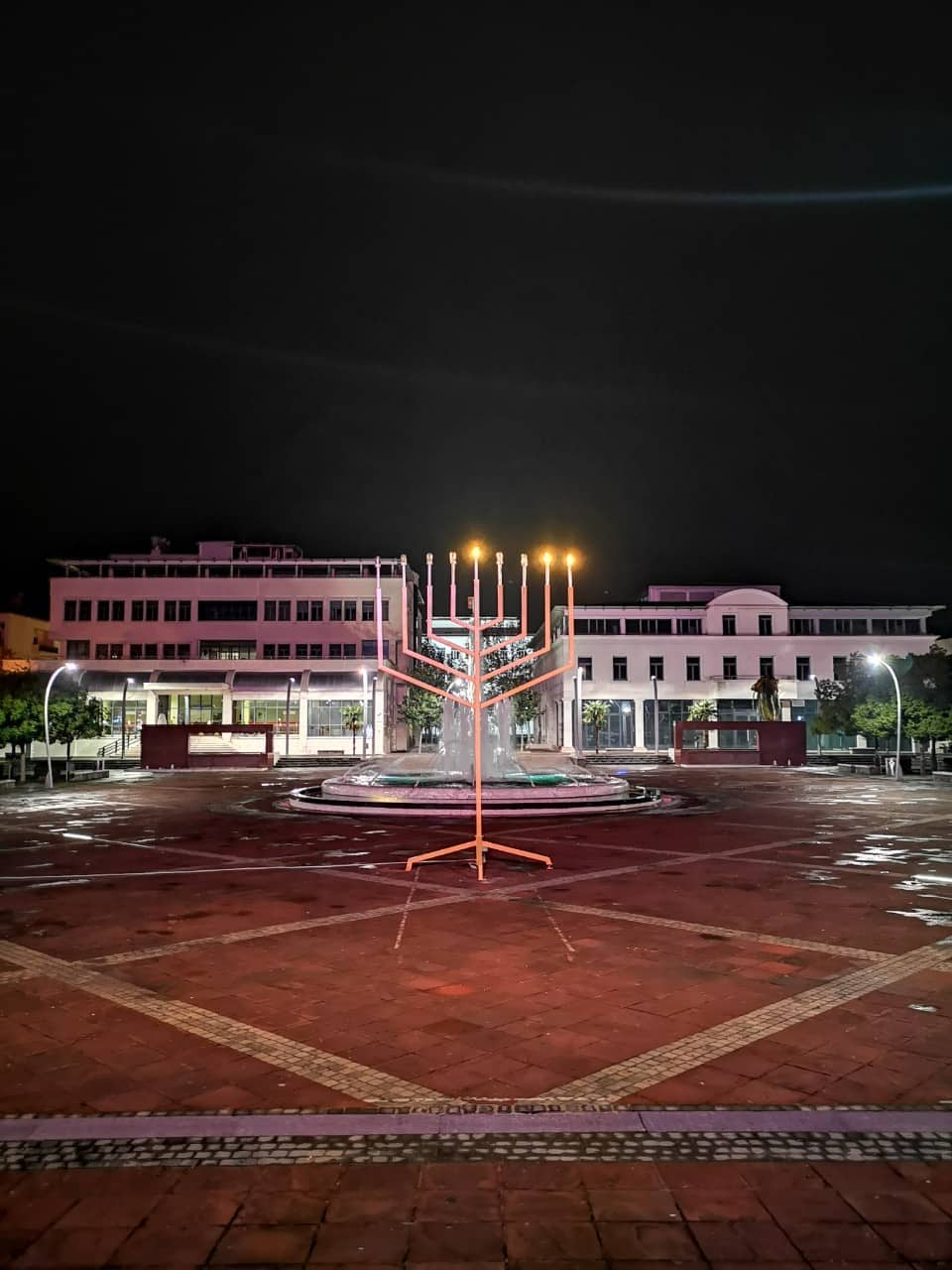
Hanukkah in Podgorica

The history of the Jews of Montenegro dates back to the times when that area was connected to the division of the Roman Empire between Roman and Byzantine rule. As a relatively young country, modern-day Montenegro has a young Jewish community, which is one of the smallest and youngest in the world. The 2007 Montenegrin Statistical Yearbook lists 12 Jews in the country, spread across nine towns.

== History ==
The history of Jews in the area of today's Montenegro has not been sufficiently explored. The research was fragmentary as part of other scientific treatments.

The history of Jews in these areas lasts for two millennia. Their first traces appear in the ancient Duklja, whose ruins are located in the immediate vicinity of the center of Podgorica, the capital of today's Montenegro. This very important urban center of the Roman province Prevalitane, which in its zenith counted over 70,000 inhabitants in its necropolises, reveals the grave places that archaeologists have established that they belonged to the Jews, which is not at all odd if one takes into account the size and importance of Duklja as military, commercial and administrative center until its destruction in a devastating earthquake.

In the Middle Ages, Jews within the boundaries of today's Montenegro were in those parts that were under Ottoman rule, especially in the area of the Novi Pazar sanjak in today's Pljevlja, Plav, Gusinje, Bijelo Polje and Berane, as well as in the area of the Montenegrin coast, especially in Ulcinj . Most of this Jewish life belonged to the Sephardim who came from Spain and Portugal across Bosnia or directly from Constantinople to the early 16th century.

In the 17th century, Sabbatai Zevi a famous messiah claimant, lived and is presumed to be buried in Ulcinj, after being banished from Constantinople by the grand vizier there to Dulcigno (modern-day Ulcinj).

Famous Czech medieval Lenka Blehova Čelebič recently published a pioneering work entitled "Traces of the Jews in Bay of Kotor", in which she emphasized the influence of the Jews for the development of trade in these areas, stating that in many trading deals, they were at the same level as the merchants from Dubrovnik. Especially in the organization of international trade. After the wars with Napoleon and the occupation of the Boka and part of today's Montenegrin coast that was under Austrian territory, and later Austro-Hungarian, later on again, representatives of the Jewish nation appeared again. They were mostly concentrated in Kotor, as an administrative center. In Herceg Novi, a well-known Portuguese doctor and poet of Jewish origin Isaija Koen, better known for his poetic name Flavio Eborenze Didako Piro, was buried in the immersed Jewish cemetery, who wrote a book about his exile in this city.

The importance, influence and respect that the Jews in Boka deserved in the image are illustrative of the fact that, according to the order of the Kotor bishop, a part of the cemetery was separated for the burial of the Jews. A part of the cemetery near the main entrance to the cemetery and in the immediate vicinity of the main chapel was set aside for the plot. The graveyard is in relatively good condition today and is regularly maintained.

Montenegro belongs to countries of Europe on whose territory there was not a single concentration or collection camp from which Jews were sent to death camps. Unfortunately, since September 1943, after the capitulation of Italy, Germany occupied Montenegro and Gestapo succeeded in identifying a larger number of Jews remaining in Montenegro by February 1944. Most of them were taken to several camps in a small camp at Sajmište, and then to other camps where they experienced a similar fate as the others.

After World War II, a very small number of Jews remained in Montenegro. The survivors have mostly returned to their former dwellings. In Montenegro, there were those who indicated marital status or work obligations. The exact number of Jews who live and work in Montenegro today is difficult to determine because it is mostly about mixed marriages.

According to the Jewish Community of Montenegro, the country is one of the few countries, and the only one in the region, where there is strong interfaith harmony and there is no public manifestation of antisemitism or general negative attitude towards Jewish people and the state of Israel. The community also states that there is high respect for the Jewish people and their contribution to world civilization.

Since the declaration of independence, Montenegro has established diplomatic relations with Israel. Israel in Montenegro presents a non-resident ambassador.

The decision to form a formal community was made in June 2011. In July of the same year, the community was registered as a citizens' association and gained certain legal legitimacy. Soon after registering, the Chief Rabbi of Israel, Rabbi Yona Metzger visited Montenegro and the Jewish community. Rabbi Metzger, along with escorts and leading members of the community, was received by the most important state officials: the President of the State, the Parliament and the Government.

In January 2012, the Jewish community of Montenegro signed a treaty with the Government on mutual relations, thus recognizing the Jewish religion as one of the official religions in the country, with all the rights and obligations resulting therefrom. This agreement granted Jews full autonomy in regulating their religious and national relations, to the extent that it does not conflict with the law.In 2013, the Jewish Community of Montenegro appointed its first ever Chief rabbi since the country’s independence. On December 26th, 2013. Rabbi Prelevic, with Jewish community president Jasha Alfandari, met with Montenegro’s Prime Minister. Milo Djukanovic in the Prime Minister’s office in Podgorica. Since its registration, the leadership of the Community, headed by Jaso Alfandari as president and Djordje Raičević as vice-president, provided funds for financing unobstructed work, the necessary business premises, its maintenance, as well as organizing celebrations of all holidays starting from the arrival of the new 5772, through Hanukkah, Purim, Pesah and the ceremonial Seder evening organized on this occasion.

In 2017, Los Angeles-born Rabbi Ari Edelkopf of the Chabad Hasidic movement settled in the capital city Podgorica with the mission of promoting Judaism among the country's few Jews, as well as assisting Jewish visitors to Montenegro. Unveiling for the country's new synagogue took place in December 2017 in the Montenegrin capital city Podgorica.

Construction of another synagogue in Podgorica started in 2024. Named "Har HaShem", it will also serve as a cultural center.

== See also ==
- Religion in Montenegro
- History of the Jews in Serbia
- History of the Jews in Yugoslavia
