= Kosovo and Serbia economic normalization agreements =

Agreement between Kosovo and Serbia to facilitate economic normalization among themselves

Washington Agreement
Kosovo and Serbia economic normalization agreements
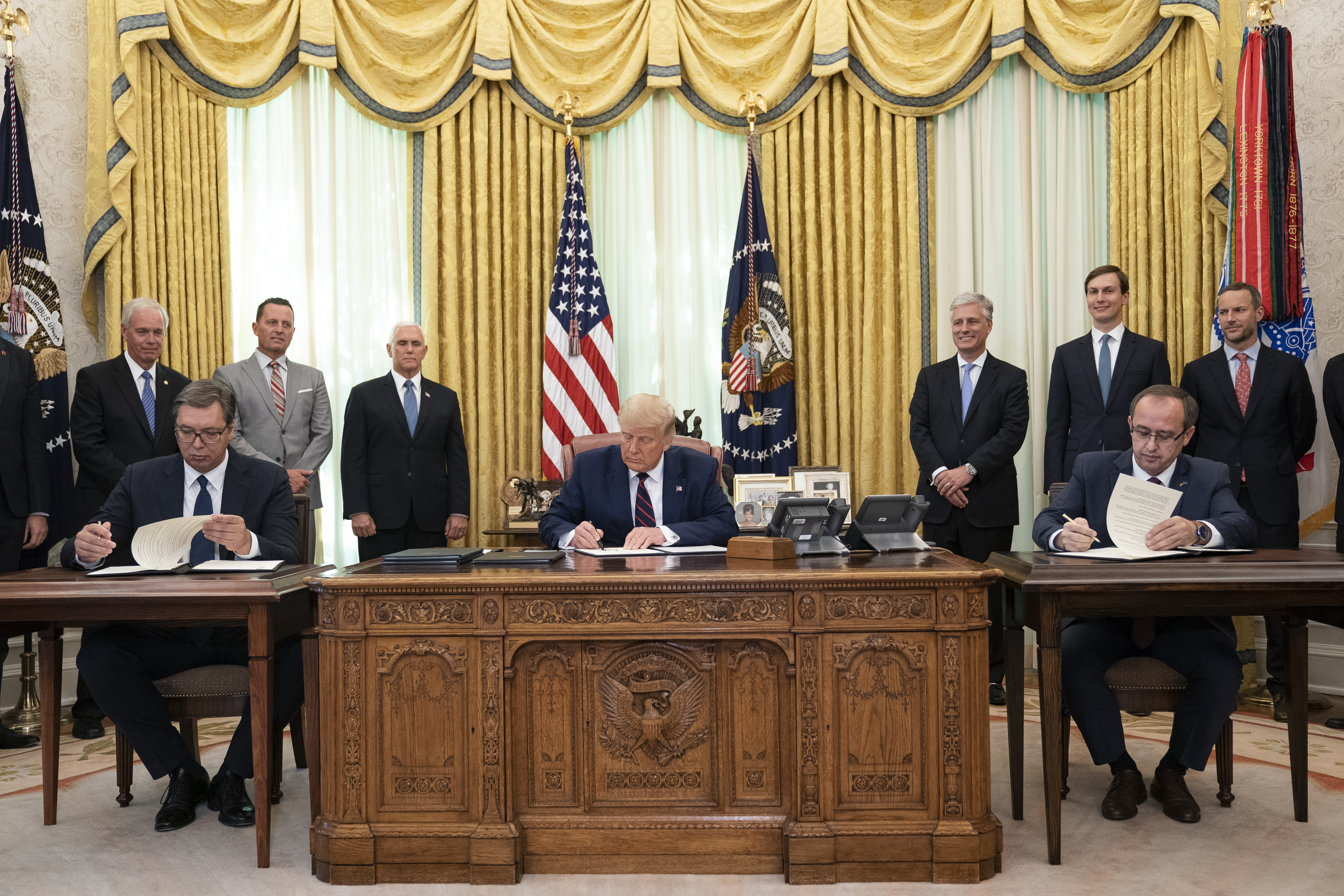
- The signing ceremony in the Oval Office
- Signed: September 4, 2020
- Location: White House, Washington, D.C., United States
- Mediators: Donald Trump (witness)
- Negotiators: Avdullah Hoti; Aleksandar Vučić
- Parties: Kosovo; Serbia
- Language: English

The Kosovo and Serbia economic normalization agreements, informally known as the Washington Agreement, are a pair of documents in which Kosovo and Serbia agreed to facilitate economic normalization among themselves. The documents were signed by the Prime Minister of Kosovo Avdullah Hoti and the President of Serbia Aleksandar Vučić on September 4, 2020, at the White House, in the presence of the President of the United States Donald Trump.

== Background ==
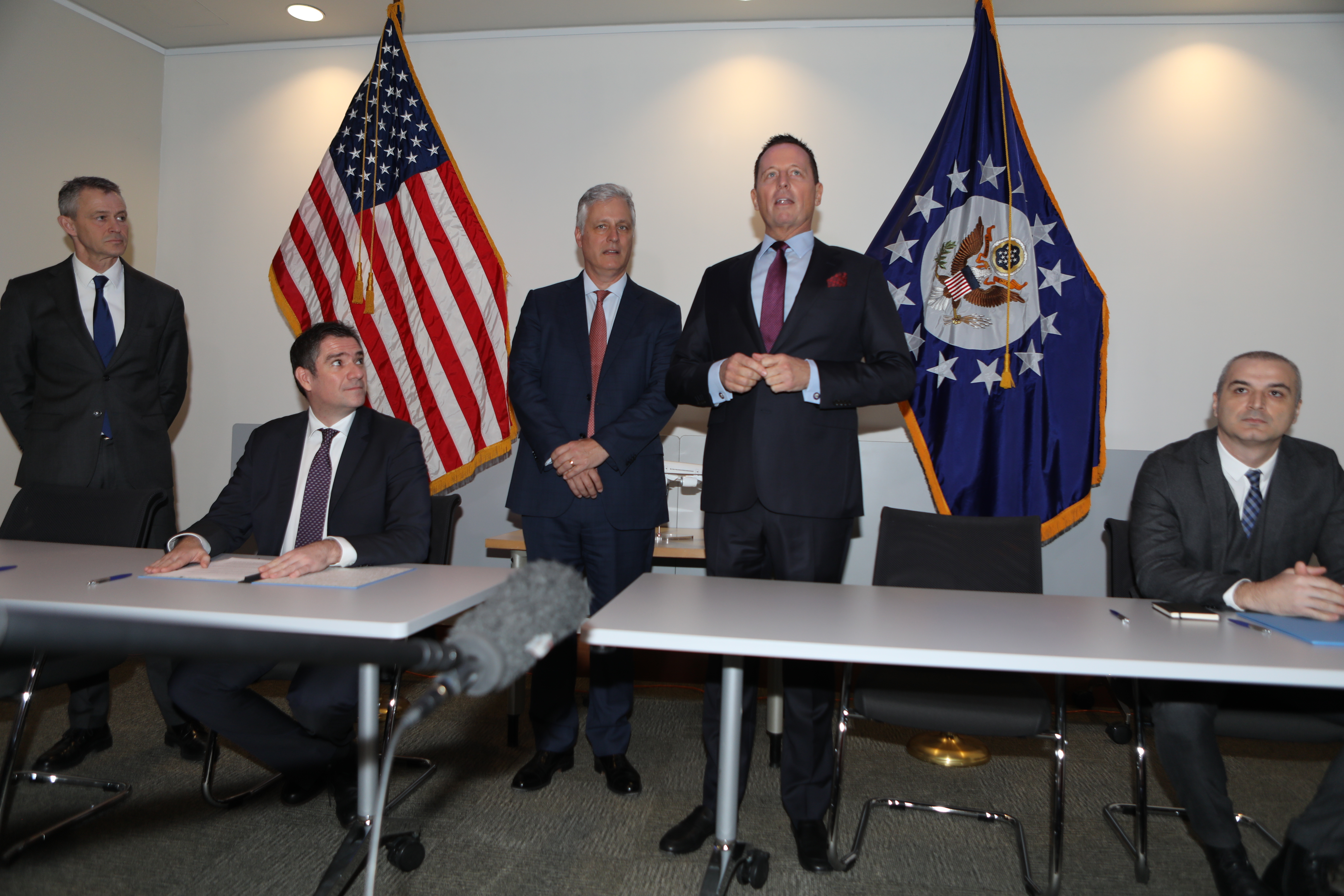
Milun Trivunac, State Secretary of the Ministry of Economy of Serbia (sitting left), Richard Grenell, Special US Presidential Envoy for Serbia and Kosovo Peace Negotiations (standing right), Eset Berisha, Director of the Civil Aviation Authority of Kosovo (sitting right)

On October 4, 2019, Trump appointed Richard Grenell as Special Presidential Envoy for Serbia and Kosovo Peace Negotiations. After months of diplomatic talks, on January 20, 2020, Grenell facilitated negotiations between Serbia and Kosovo where the two nations agreed to restore flights between their capitals for the first time in more than two decades. A June 27, 2020, peace summit between the two sides was arranged to take place in Washington D.C., but was canceled due to the potential indictment of Hashim Thaçi on war crimes.

A new summit, located at the White House, was organized by Grenell and scheduled for September 3 and 4, 2020. Grenell, along with Robert C. O'Brien, cohosted the talks. On September 4, the agreements were signed by Serbian President Aleksandar Vučić and Kosovo Prime Minister Avdullah Hoti. The signing ceremony took place in the Oval Office at the White House in the presence of President Trump on September 4, 2020, two months before the US presidential election. Two separate documents were signed, one by Vučić and the other by Hoti. The only difference between the two was the final clause regarding relations with Israel. Both documents were prefaced with a congratulatory note from Trump.

While participating in negotiations with the United States over economic issues, Kosovo and Serbia have continued to participate in a parallel dialogue led by the European Union that has focused on the political disagreements between the two sides. Both sides faced difficulties due to the COVID-19 pandemic.

== Provisions ==
Under the terms of the agreements signed, for a period of one year, Serbia agreed to suspend its efforts, both official and unofficial, to encourage other states to either not recognize Kosovo or to revoke existing recognition. In return, Kosovo agreed not to apply for new membership in international organizations for the same time period. There are also commitments to find and identify remains of missing persons from the 1998–99 Kosovo conflict and to rehabilitate refugees from that conflict and from after the end of the war.

Kosovo and Serbia agreed to conduct a joint feasibility study examining different options for connecting the Belgrade-Pristina rail network with a deep seaport on the coast of the Adriatic Sea. Both sides agreed to work with the U.S. International Development Finance Corporation and Export–Import Bank of the United States on memorandums of understanding to operationalise the Peace Highway, the rail link between Pristina and Merdare, the rail link between Niš and Pristina, financing to small- and medium-sized enterprises and other projects. They will also operationalize the Merdare administrative crossing point on the border between the two nations. The United States promised both sides loans guaranteed by the U.S. government to fund the strategic infrastructure developments and the U.S. International Development Finance Corporation will have full-time presence in Belgrade.

Both sides will increase airline passenger screening, information sharing between each other within the framework of broader U.S. cooperation in the Balkans and commit to technology upgrades to combat illicit activities.

They will also conduct a feasibility study with the U.S. Department of Energy concerning the sharing of the Lake Gazivode/Ujmani, as a reliable water and energy supply.

As part of the agreements, Serbia and Kosovo agreed to join the mini-Schengen zone.

Each side will recognize the diplomas and professional certificates from the other.

Serbia agreed to move its Israeli embassy to Jerusalem from Tel Aviv in July 2021, and Israel and Kosovo agreed to a mutual recognition of each other and establishment of diplomatic relations. Kosovo also announced that they would locate their embassy in Jerusalem. In doing so, Serbia and Kosovo were set to become the first in Europe to have embassies in Jerusalem, with Kosovo being the first with a Muslim majority population in the world to do so. Kosovo has had an embassy in Jerusalem since March 2021, and Serbia has opened an honorary consulate in Jerusalem, though its embassy to Israel remains in Tel Aviv. The agreements also contain provisions where Serbia and Kosovo designate Hezbollah as a terrorist organization.

Each side will remove 5G equipment from their mobile networks provided by what was termed "untrusted vendors" and to prohibit such vendors from bidding in the future. Officials from Serbia and Kosovo said this was a reference to Chinese companies such as Huawei Technologies.

Both sides pledged to protect and promote freedom of religion, including renewed interfaith communication, protection of religious sites and implementation of court decisions regarding the Serbian Orthodox Church, continued restitution of Holocaust-era heirless and unclaimed Jewish property.

Additionally, the agreement includes a provision where Kosovo and Serbia support the decriminalization of homosexuality around the world.

== Implementation ==
On September 15, 2020, letters of interest were signed by the U.S. International Development Finance Corporation and the Export–Import Bank of the United States with the governments of Kosovo and Serbia for financing the construction of a "Peace Highway" between Nis and Pristina.

On September 21, 2020, Richard Grenell and Adam S. Boehler, the CEO of the US International Development Finance Corporation, visited Pristina, Kosovo and met with Prime Minister Avdullah Hoti. Together they signed the Kosovo-US Investment Agreement, in which the United States pledged to invest 1 billion dollars in Kosovo for railway projects linking Kosovo and Serbia, the Ski Center in Brezovica, the Peace Highway, and other initiatives of the 2020 Kosovo Serbia Economic Normalization Agreement. On September 22, 2020, Richard Grenell and Adam Boehler visited Belgrade, Serbia. Boehler met Serbian Prime Minister Ana Brnabić and the two signed a joint statement between the United States and Serbia on the financing of economic development. They also opened up the US International Development Finance Corporation's first overseas office in Belgrade.

On September 22, 2020, the heads of the Chambers of Commerce of Kosovo and Serbia, Berat Rukiqi and Marko Cadez, signed a statement on creating a joint team dedication to implementing the Kosovo Serbia Economic Normalization Agreement.

On October 14, 2020, the Serbia government staffed and operationalized the Merdare border crossing between Serbia-Kosovo.

On October 19, 2020, the governments of Serbia and Kosovo reached a draft agreement of the formation of a joint committee to find the remains of approximately 1,600 ethnic Albanians and Serbs who have been missing since the 1998-1999 Kosovo Conflict.

On January 21, 2021, Anthony Godfrey, the U.S. Ambassador to Serbia, and Sinisa Mali, the Finance Minister of Serbia, signed an investment incentive agreement allowing the U.S. International Development Finance Corporation to begin its activities in Serbia. Mali stated that, “This agreement is important, because it confirms that the Washington agreement is still being implemented. We are thereby continuing what was agreed in Washington.”

On February 1, 2021, Kosovo and Israel established diplomatic relations and on March 14, 2021, Kosovo officially opened its embassy in Israel.

== Reactions ==
=== Favourable ===
- Israel: Prime Minister Benjamin Netanyahu issued a statement welcoming the agreements and wrote that the agreement and stated Kosovo will be the "first country with a Muslim majority to open an embassy in Jerusalem. As I have said in recent days, the circle of peace and recognition of Israel is widening and other nations are expected to join it."
- Kosovo: Prime Minister Avdullah Hoti stated that the signing of the agreements was a "great moment for Kosovo and the region". On September 19, 2020, President Thaçi awarded President Trump the Order of Freedom, one of Kosovo's highest honors, for his personal contribution to strengthening the peace and reconciliation of the Balkan region. Robert O'Brien and Richard Grenell were also awarded Presidential Medals of Merits, with President Thaci calling them “indispensable” to the deal.
- Russia: Foreign Minister Sergey Lavrov confirmed its open support to Serbia with regard of Kosovo. "We believe that this was done in the interests of a settlement, and we have no reason to doubt that the Serbian leadership continues supporting the full implementation of the UN Security Council resolution 1244. We will firmly support Serbia in the steps it considers necessary to take within the framework of this resolution," Lavrov said.
- Serbia: President Aleksandar Vučić stated that the agreements were "a huge step forward".
- United States: President Trump praised the agreements stating that it was a "Truly historic day" and adding that there "was a lot of fighting and now there's a lot of love. Economics can bring people together."

=== Unfavourable ===
- The Arab League criticised the decision of Serbia and Kosovo to open embassies in Jerusalem rather than Tel Aviv.
- (Palestine) The Palestinian Ministry of Foreign Affairs and Expatriates denounced what was issued by the President of the United States Donald Trump regarding the approval of the governments of Serbia and Kosovo to open embassies in the city of Jerusalem, as it described this step as a "blatant and unjustified aggression against the Palestinian people, their cause, and their just and legitimate national rights." The Palestinian ambassador to Serbia Mohammed Nabhan responded saying "This statement, as long as it materializes, is contrary to international law and to UN resolutions concerning the Palestinian question and Jerusalem as an occupied city."
- Turkey expressed concern about the decision of Serbia to relocate its embassy in Israel to Jerusalem describing it as a "clear violation of international law". Turkey also urged Kosovo to not have its embassy in Israel located in Jerusalem.

=== Mixed ===
- European Union: On September 7, 2020, in Brussels, President Aleksandar Vučić and Prime Minister Avdullah Hoti confirmed that they attach the highest priority to EU integration and to continuing the work on the EU-facilitated Belgrade-Pristina Dialogue which is a key element of their respective EU paths. The recently agreed documents in Washington, building on previous Dialogue-related commitments could provide a useful contribution to reaching a comprehensive, legally binding agreement on normalization of relations. On the same date, the European Union warned Serbia and Kosovo that they could undermine their EU membership hopes by moving their Israeli embassies to Jerusalem. Serbian Foreign Minister Ivica Dačić said the final decision will still have to be discussed by the government and will depend on “a number of factors” including future development of ties with Israel. EU foreign affairs spokesman Peter Stano said "In this context, any diplomatic steps that could call into question the EU's common position on Jerusalem are a matter of serious concern and regret."

== See also ==
- Belgrade–Pristina negotiations
- Brussels Agreement (2013)
- Agreement on the path to normalisation between Kosovo and Serbia
- Kosovo–Serbia relations
- Israel–Kosovo relations
- Israel–Serbia relations
- Israel–United Arab Emirates normalization agreement
- Bahrain–Israel normalization agreement
- Israel–Sudan normalization agreement
- Israel–Morocco normalization agreement
