= Israel–Serbia relations =

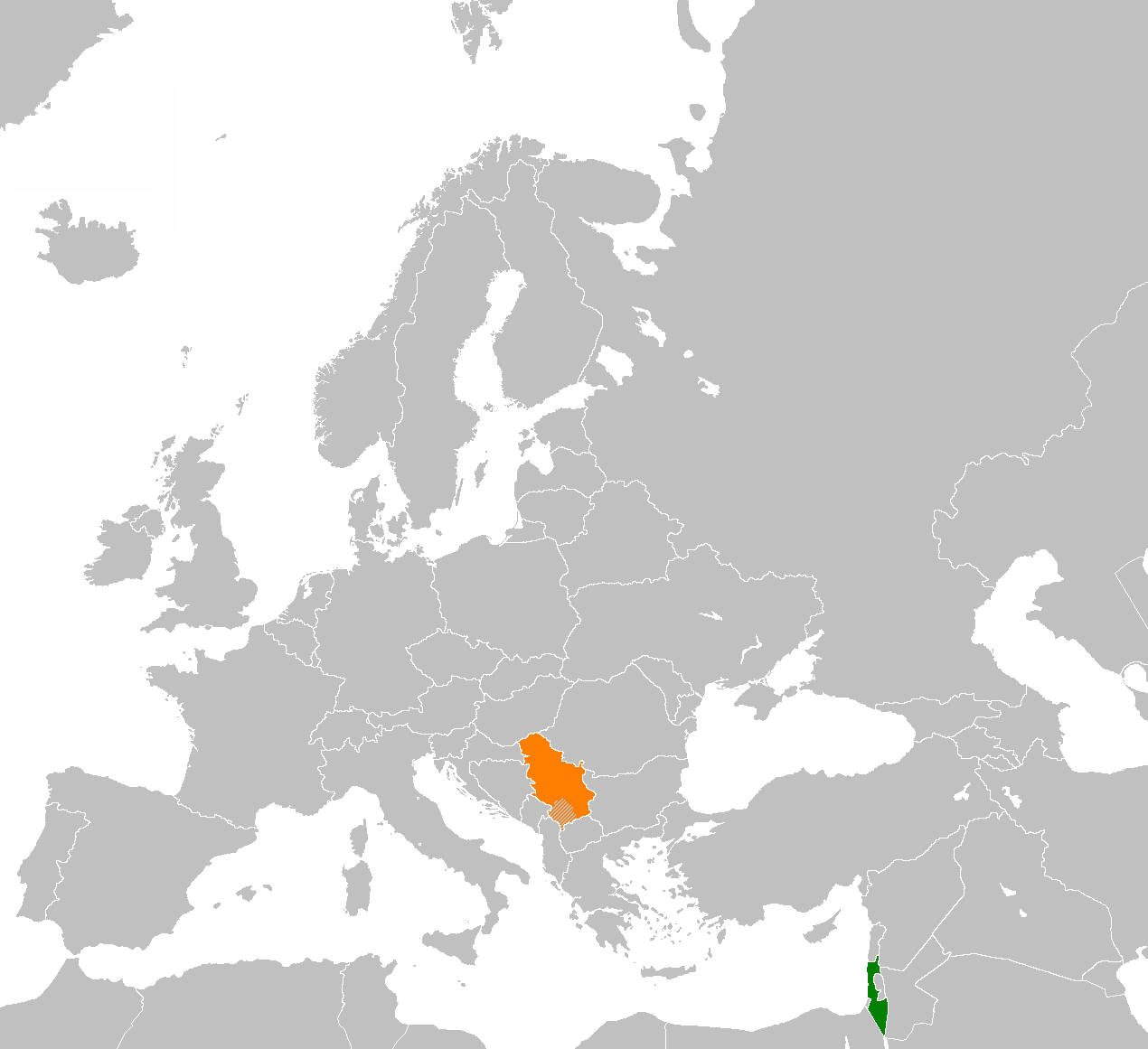
- Israel: Serbia

Israel and Serbia maintain diplomatic relations established between Israel and SFR Yugoslavia in 1948. The current diplomatic relations between two countries started in 1992, with the founding of the Federal Republic of Yugoslavia, a rump state of SFR Yugoslavia, with Serbia being its main component. The Socialist Federal Republic of Yugoslavia was already immersed in the process of disintegration due to civil war when in January 1992 it restored diplomatic relations between Israel, which were frozen due to the Six-Day War in 1967 as the government sided with the Arab states.

After Slovenia, Croatia, Macedonia and finally Bosnia seceded, Serbia decided to remain in federation with Montenegro and inherited the recognition of Israel made by the Yugoslav government months earlier. Relations continued after the reform of the political structure of the country and its change of name to the State Union of Serbia and Montenegro in 2003. In 2006, Montenegro declared independence after a referendum and Serbia inherited all diplomatic relations the former union had with other countries, including Israel, as the sole legal successor of the state union.

== History ==
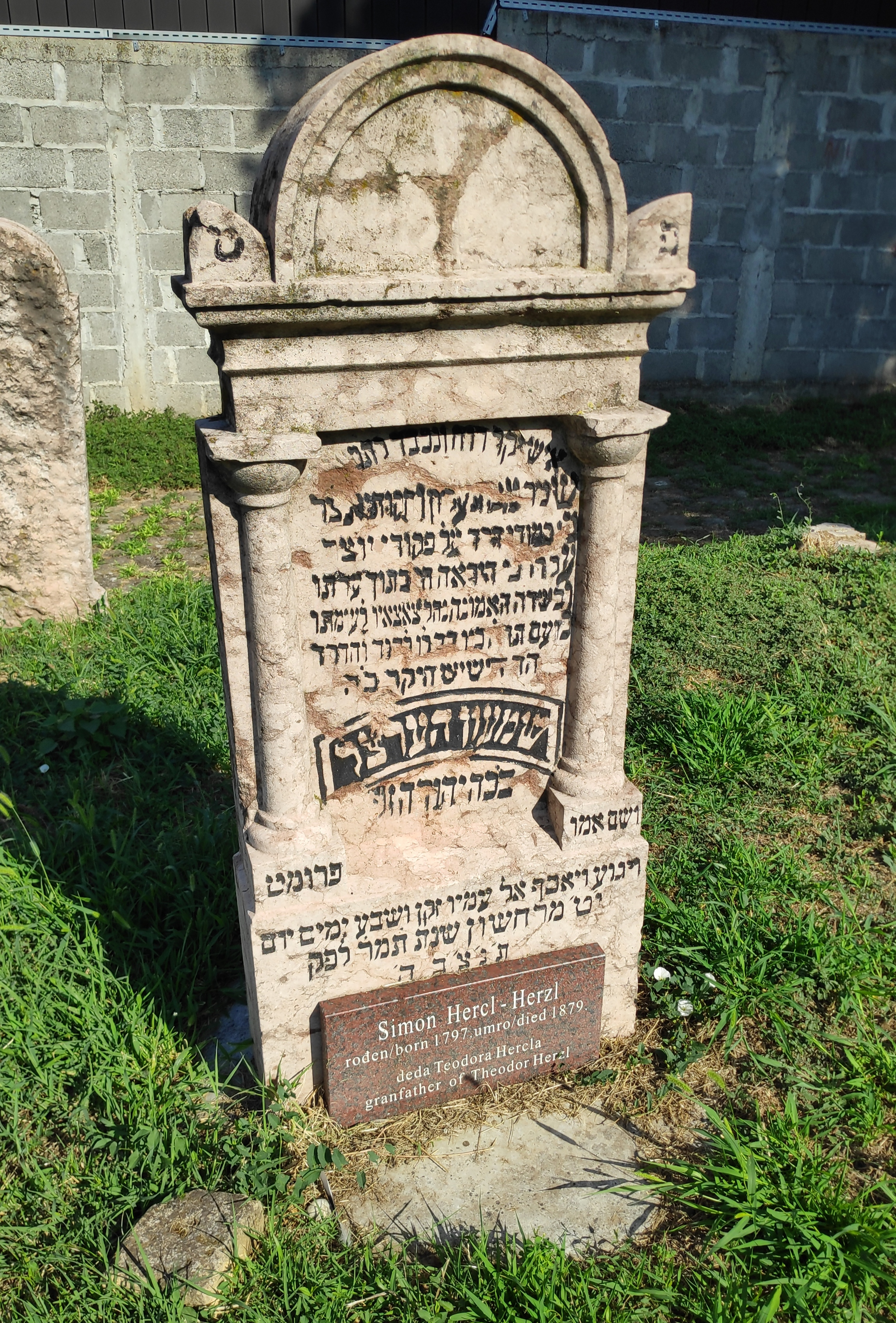
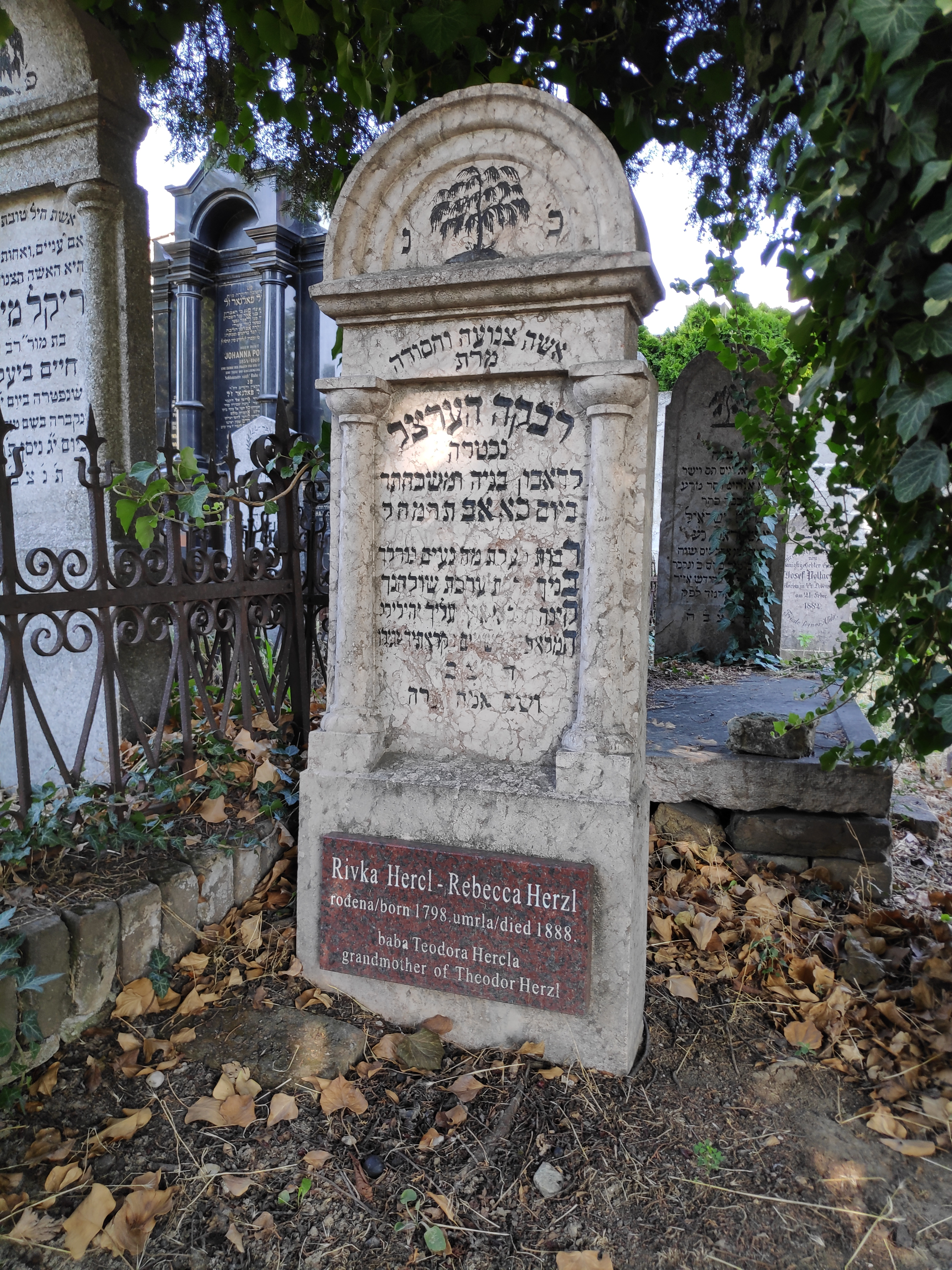
Grave of Theodor Herzel's grandparents, Zemun Cemetery. Ancestors of Theodor Herzl, the founder of modern political Zionism lived in Zemun, today's part of Belgrade.

Ever since the 13th century there has been a recorded Jewish community of both Ashkenazi and Sephardic Jews in the city of Belgrade. The first Jews to settle in the city originally arrived from Italy and the city of Dubrovnik, and later on from Hungary and Spain.

The Jewish communities of the Balkans saw significant influx in the 15th and 16th centuries by the arrival of Jewish refugees fleeing the Spanish and Portuguese Inquisitions. Sultan Bayezid II of the Ottoman Empire welcomed the Jewish refugees into his Empire. Jews became involved in trade between the various provinces in the Ottoman Empire, becoming especially important in the salt trade. In the northern province of Vojvodina, which was under Habsburg rule, Jews settled in the 18th century, particularly after the 1782 Edict of Tolerance by the Emperor Joseph II, which gave Jews a measure of religious freedom.

The Government of the Kingdom of Serbia, in exile at the time because of the German-Austrian occupation during the World War I, was the first government to officially endorse the Balfour Declaration, which announced the establishment of the Jewish state in Palestine. Serbian diplomat to the United States and Zionist leader David Albala announced the support for the declaration on 27 December 1917. Milenko Vesnić, Serbian ambassador to Paris from 1907 to 1920, in one document referred to the new Jewish state as "Israel", which was the first official mention of that name in the international politics.

The Jewish community developed substantially before and after World War I following the religious autonomy they have received, and many Jewish educational institutions and synagogues for both the Ashkenazi and Sephardic communities were established. By the year 1939 there were approximately 10,400 Jews living in Belgrade.

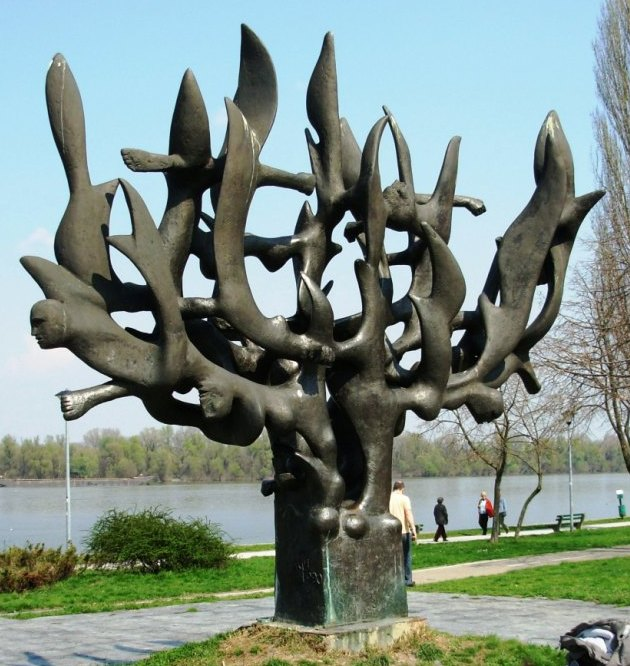
The sculpture "Menorah in Flames" (Menora u plamenu) to the Holocaust victims in Belgrade

Most of the Jews living in Serbia were killed during the Holocaust. During the war, many Jews were given refuge by the Yugoslav Partisans, led by Josip Broz Tito, and many of them fought along their side. Serbian civilians were involved in saving thousands of Yugoslavian Jews during this period. After the war, most of those who survived gradually emigrated to Israel. Until 1952, a total of 7,578 Jews emigrated from Yugoslavia to Israel. During the period, Yugoslavia was mostly neutral in the Arab–Israeli conflict, but maintained ties with Israel, helped by its sizable Jewish emigration. According to the 2022 census, there are 709 declared Jews in Serbia, living mainly in Belgrade and Vojvodina.

Yugoslavia and Israel established diplomatic relations in 1948 with Yugoslavia being the second European country to recognize Israel. Yugoslavia severed all diplomatic relations with Israel following the Six-Day War in 1967, and it was following a pro-Arab policy since. In the middle of the breakup of Yugoslavia, the Yugoslav government restored diplomatic relations with Israel in 31 January 1992, but by that time, Slovenia, Croatia and Macedonia had already seceded from Belgrade. This was done to achieve certain international support as the Milošević regime was practically isolated from the international community during the Yugoslav Wars.

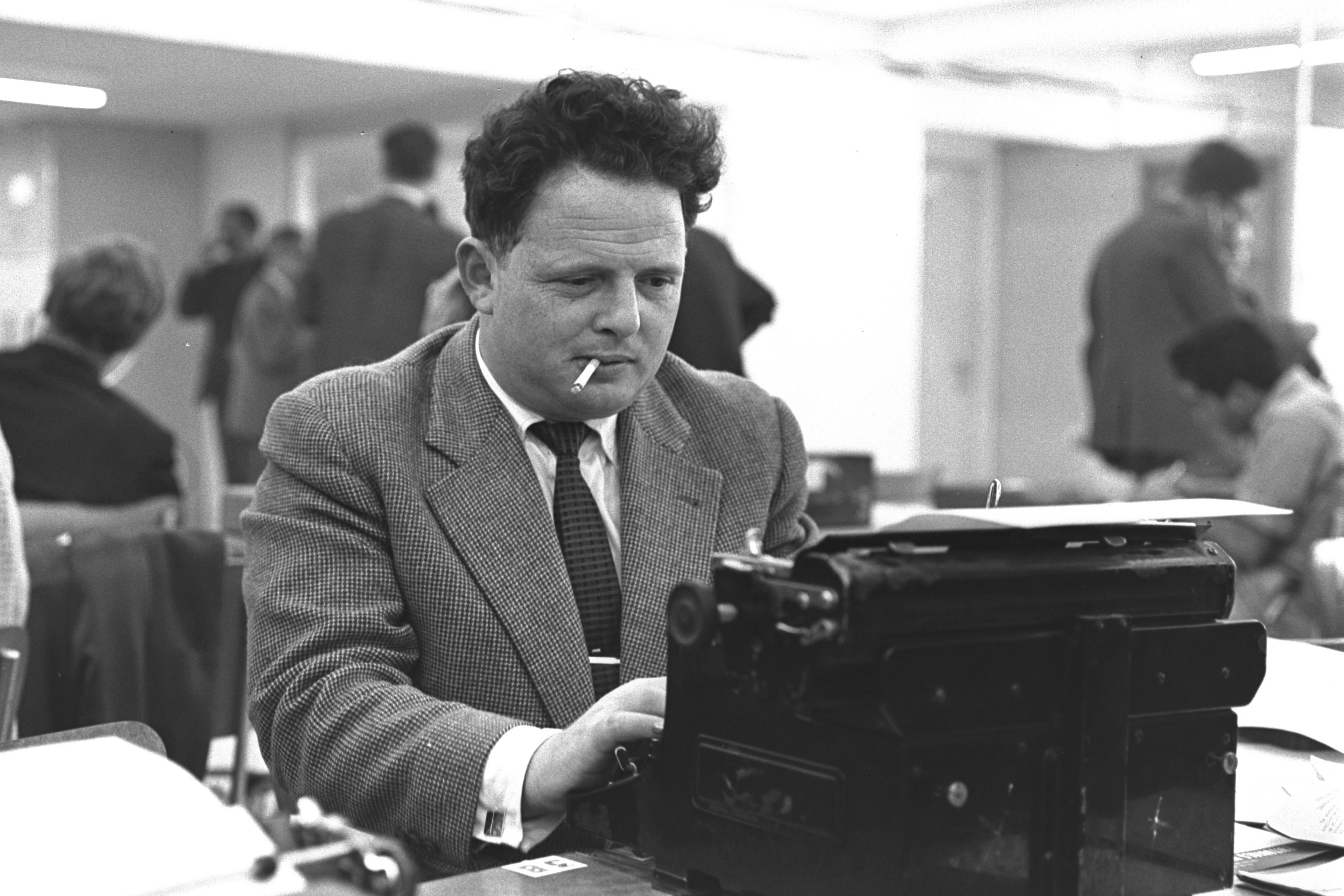
Tommy Lapid, a Serbian-born Israeli radio and television presenter, playwright, journalist, politician, and Minister of Justice

It was subsequently reported that Israel had purposely provided weapons to the Serbs during the Bosnian War, possibly due to the pro-Serbian bias of the government of the time, or possibly in exchange for the Sarajevo Jewish community to make aliyah to Israel. However, at the time it was not clear how extensive the supply was, or whether they were provided by state or private arms dealers, or whether the Israeli government had even known or approved of such transfers. It has been alleged that the Israeli intelligence service, Mossad was responsible for providing Bosnian Serbs with a substantial supply of artillery shells and mortar bombs in return for the safe passage for the Jewish population out of the besieged town of Sarajevo.

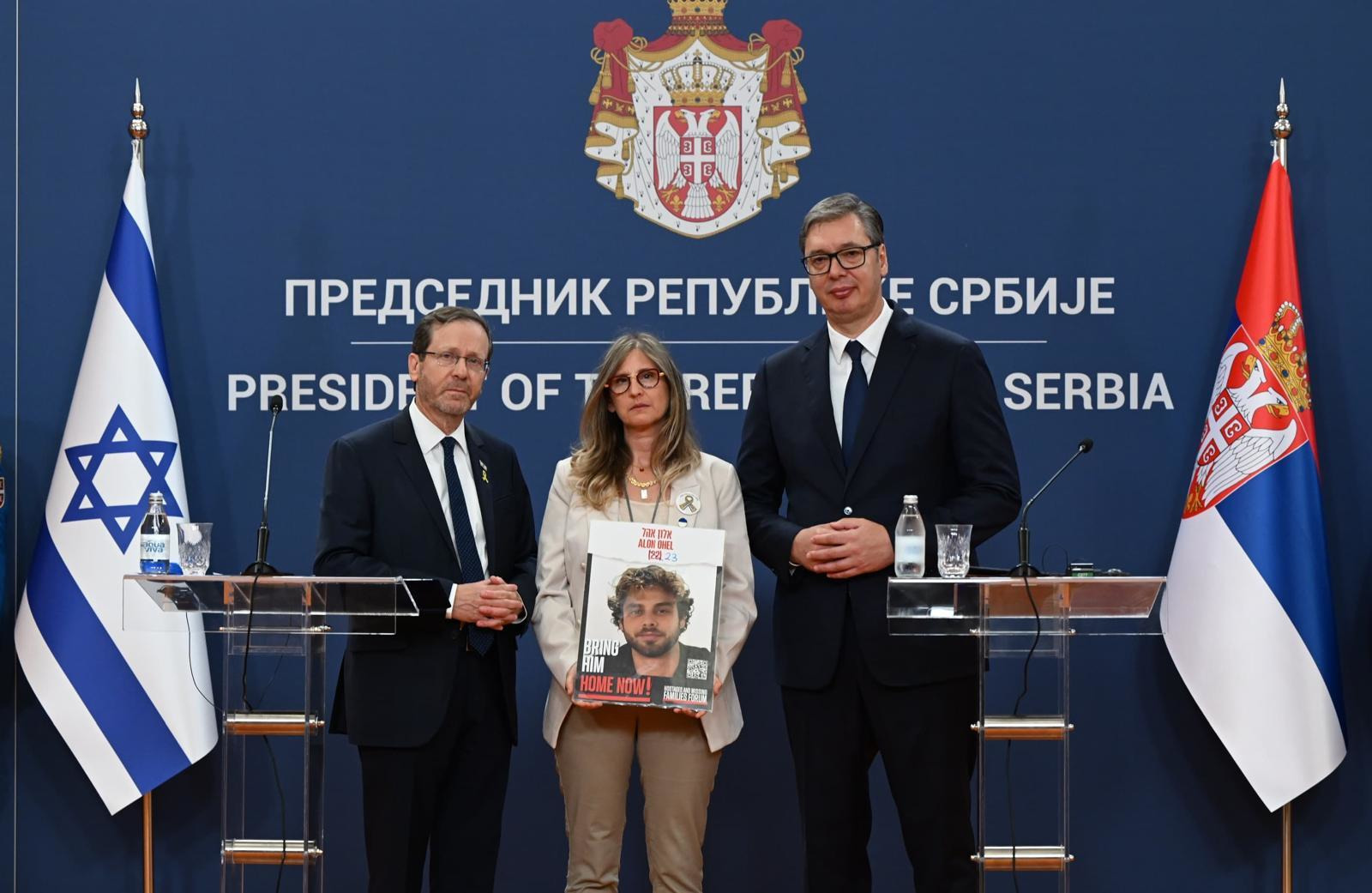
Isaac Herzog, President of Israel, Aleksandar Vučić, President of Serbia, and Idit Ohel, the mother of the abductee to Gaza, Alon Ohel, 2024

In July 2023, Israeli foreign minister Eli Cohen described Serbia as the "strongest ally of the State of Israel in the region".

In April 2024, Israeli ambassador to Serbia, Yahel Wilan, expressed his opinion that he did not consider the Srebrenica massacre a genocide and commented that Israel has not formally recognized it as such.

Following the October 7 attacks Serbian President Aleksandar Vučić condemned the "horrific attacks", adding that "the Jewish people have endured a history of suffering and Israel deserves to live in peace and security" while also calling for a compromise between Palestinians and Israelis. Media reports have suggested Serbia is a major supplier of weapons and ammunition to Israel during the Gaza war, with at least two major shipments sent during the conflict. Serbia's state-owned arms manufacturer, Yugoimport SDPR, exported over 23.1 million euros worth of arms and ammunition to Israel during 2024.

In June 2024, a Serbian-Muslim assailant attacked a police officer outside of the Israeli embassy in Belgrade. In October 2026, a assailant with a knife attacked the police officer guarding the embassy. The officer shot the assailant dead.

In September 2024, Israeli President Isaac Herzog visited Sebia, meeting with Serbian President Aleksandar Vučić in Belgrade.

In June 2025, due to the Twelve-Day War, the government announced halt on exporting arms to Israel. This came after Iran warned that providing weapons to Israel would be considered an "act of aggression" against Iran.

In 2026, Francesca Albanese, the UN Special Rapporteur on the occupied Palestinian territories, described Serbia as "one of Israel's strongest and most determined allies."

== Israeli stance on Kosovo ==
Serbia (yellow) and Kosovo (striped)

Israel refused to support the 1999 NATO bombing of Yugoslavia, leading to admonishment from the United States. Ariel Sharon criticized NATO's bombing as an act of "brutal interventionism". In the first detailed Israeli response to the NATO campaign against Serbia, Sharon said both Serbia and Kosovo have been victims of violence. He said prior to the current Yugoslav campaign against Kosovo Albanians, Serbians were the targets of attacks in the Kosovo province. "Israel has a clear policy. We are against aggressive actions. We are against hurting innocent people. I hope that the sides will return to the negotiating table as soon as possible." During the crisis, Elyakim Haetzni said the Serbs should be the first to receive Israeli aid. "They are our traditional friends," he told Israel Radio." On Sharon's death, Serbian minister Aleksandar Vulin stated: "The Serbian people will remember Sharon for opposing the 1999 NATO bombing campaign against the former Yugoslavia and advocating respect for sovereignty of other nations and a policy of not interfering with their internal affairs." It was suggested that Israel's pro-Serbian position may have been a result of Serbs saving Jews during the Holocaust, personal memories of which were still present among many older Israeli politicians serving in government at the time such as Tommy Lapid.

In 2009, Arthur Koll, the Israeli ambassador to Serbia, said that though it had been more than a year since Kosovo unilaterally declared independence, Israel had no intention of recognizing the declaration, and that "Israel is asked from time to time how solid this decision is, but the fact is that Israel's position has not changed throughout this time. The Serbian people and government should appreciate Israel's position, which also demonstrates the friendship between the two states." This decision is regarded in part due to the possibility of the Palestinian Authority using such a recognition to justify their own unilateral declaration of independence. In 2009, during an official visit to Belgrade, Israeli Foreign Minister Avigdor Lieberman also reaffirmed that Israel would not recognise Kosovo, but hoped the issue would be resolved peacefully.

Israel recognized Kosovo as an independent state in 2020 and the two agreed to establish formal diplomatic relations with Kosovo being one of the few states to have their embassy in Jerusalem. Israel's ambassador to Serbia later claimed in a 2021 interview on Serbian TV that this decision was made under U.S. pressure.

== Serbian stance on Palestine ==
In 2011 Serbia voted to recognize Palestine as UNESCO's 195th member, against Israel's stated position. Serbia declared that it would not have opposed a resolution recognizing Palestinian sovereignty, had one come before the UN General Assembly.

== Economic relations ==
Trade between two countries amounted to $112 million in 2023; Israel's merchandise export to Serbia were about $36 million; Serbian exports were standing at $76 million. Israel's export to Serbia includes herbicides and fuel oil, while Serbia's export to Israel includes mainly tobacco and tires.

Israeli companies invested in Serbia largely in the real estate sector. AFI Europe which developed several large projects in Belgrade, with a strong emphasis on business parks and office complexes, such as Airport City Belgrade. BIG Shopping Centers, on the other hand, focuses on the development and operation of shopping centers and retail parks and is the largest retail real estate company in Serbia, with a portfolio that includes over 270,000 square meters of gross leasable area across four shopping malls and nine retail parks. In manufacturing sector, Beit Shemesh Engines (which manufactures and repairs jet engines and jet engine components) has plant in Ada.

== Military cooperation ==
Israel and Serbia have significantly ramped up their military cooperation in recent years, with Israel exporting complex military systems and solutions to Serbia and Serbia mostly exporting large calibre munitions to Israel.

In 2024–2025, the Serbian government signed two military procurement contracts with the Israeli defence company Elbit Systems, worth $335 million and $1.5 billion, respectively. The first contract was for PULS multiple rocket launchers and Hermes 900 combat and surveillance drones. The second contract focused on advanced command and control systems (including intelligence solutions covering all operational levels, spanning from the strategic to the tactical), electro-optical devices, and night vision equipment.

== Travel regime ==
Since the abolition of visa restrictions between the two countries in 2009, increased tourist traffic between two countries is registered. In 2023, some 55,000 Israeli tourists visited Serbia.

== Resident diplomatic missions ==
- Israel has an embassy in Belgrade.
- Serbia has an embassy in Tel Aviv.

== See also ==
- Foreign relations of Israel
- Foreign relations of Serbia
- Israel–Yugoslavia relations
