= October 13, 2021, North Kosovo riots =

October 31, 2021 North Kosovo riots
- 2021 organized riots by Serbian protesters Part of the Kosovo dispute
- Date: October 13, 2021
- Location: Northern Kosovo
- Caused by: Mass arrests of Serbs and searches of Serbian pharmacies by the Kosovo Police
- Methods: Border crossing blockades; Protests; Riots
- Result: Withdrawal of the Kosovo Police to South Mitrovica and Zvečan (per Serbia): Partial disruption of police operations

Parties
Republic of Kosovo; Kosovo Police; Kosovo Special Forces; Kosovo Security Forces; Diplomatic support: Albania (alleged); United Kingdom; United States	(Serbia) Kosovo Serbs: Serb List; (Serbia) Tsar Lazar Guard; Diplomatic support: Serbia (alleged); Russia

Lead figures
Samedin Mehmeti; Besart Ahmeti (WIA)	No centralized leadership

Casualties and losses
4 heavily wounded 10 lightly wounded	(Serbia) 1 heavily wounded (Serbia) 10 lightly wounded
- 8 arrested, mostly Albanians; 5 albanian civilians and 1 serb civilian killed

The October 13, 2021, North Kosovo riots were a series of border crossing blockades, protests and riots that happened in the region of North Kosovo on that day. On that day the Kosovo Police seized many "smuggled goods" in several regions, including Priština, Peja, South and North Mitrovica according to an official document. Zvečan too was affected by this operation at 18:00 of the same day.

== Chronology ==
=== Riots in North Mitrovica ===
After around 7 minutes from the beginning of the operation of the Kosovo Police, Kosovo Serbs deployed trucks to block vehicle traffic and set up barricades near the Technical School in Kosovska Mitrovica. The Kosovo Police wasn't able to fully execute the operation of seizing "smuggled goods" in North Mitrovica due to the resistance of citizens, Police director Samedin Mehmeti said. In the ensuing clashes between Serb protesters and the Kosovar police, several vehicles were set on fire and, according to health authorities, ten people were left seeking medical attention in the municipality.

=== Riots in Zvečan ===
During clashes near the city, 36-year old Srecko Sofronijević, born in 1985, was shot in the back and seriously wounded, while 71-year old Verica Djelic died as a result of chemicals used by the intervention of the Kosovo Police. After arresting a man in noon, the police withdrew from Zvečan and returned to their bases. Reporters say a video of the arrest was published, and according to them, the arrested man was taken to the station for questioning.

=== Other riots ===
Ethnic Serbian villagers of Pristina have blocked roads and clashed with police, leaving at least 11 injured on both sides. Meanwhile, in Rudarë near Zvečan, a car of the newspaper Radio Free Europe/Radio Liberty was stopped and surrounded by about 50 people, who demanded that they not be filmed. In an attempt to take the camera, they damaged it and the taxi in which the team was traveling. The team managed to get away from the crowd without being injured. Another vehicle was attacked at around 15:00, in Zubin Potok. The attack occurred while the vehicle was still in motion, and there were no injuries.

== Reactions ==
=== Government reactions ===
- Kosovo, October 13, 2021: The Prime Minister of Kosovo, Albin Kurti, stated that today's action by the Kosovo Police was directed against smugglers in Pristina, Peja and in the northern and southern parts of Kosovska Mitrovica. "Crime and criminal groups will not be tolerated and will be fought. We will fight and prevent smuggling", he said on Twitter.
- Kosovo, October 13, 2021: The Minister of Internal Affairs, Xhelal Sveçla, in a press conference in Pristina regarding the police action, said that this operation is not directed against any nationality. According to him, this operation is directed against criminals who have smuggled illegal goods into the territory of the Republic of Kosovo, both Albanians and Serbians.
- Serbia, October 13, 2021: Serbian Parliament skopesman Ivica Dačić said on the latest developments in North Kosovo that the international community must take the strictest measures to stop unilateral moves that will bring the entire region to a 'war or peace' situation.
- Serbia, October 15, 2021: "The fight against organized crime is uncompromising and non-negotiable. To negotiate and compromise with crime is to become one of them", politician Nikola Selaković said during a debate at a United Nations Security Council.

=== International reactions ===
- Serbia, October 13, 2021: At a press conference in Belgrade, the Director of the Office for Kosovo and Metohija, Petar Petković, claimed that dozens of people were injured. One of them, the 36-year old Srecko Sofronijević, born in 1985, was shot in the back and seriously wounded. "Doctors at the operating room in Kosovska Mitrovica are currently fighting to save his life", Petkovic said. He claimed that the Kosovo Police was heading towards the Technical School in Kosovska Mitrovica, but that the brave, unarmed Serbian people managed to defend themselves and drive them out, who then retreated to the "Belvedere base" in South Mitrovica. Another clash took place against 6 armored vehicles of the police, who were chased away again.
- European Union, October 13, 2021: The High Representative of the Union for Foreign Affairs and Security Policy, Josep Borrell, said that the unilateral actions of the Kosovo Police in North Kosovo are unacceptable and called for an immediate end to violent incidents. He added that the action of the Kosovo Police was directed only against crime and smuggling in four Kosovo municipalities, one of which is located in the northern part of Kosovo.
- Serbian Orthodox Church, October 13, 2021: The Eparchy of Raška and Prizren expressed its greatest concern regarding the actions of the Kosovo Police in North Kosovo, during which "much violence was used against Serbian citizens". The Egarchy also appealed to the international forces of the Kosovo Force (KFOR) and the European Union Rule of Law Mission in Kosovo (EULEX) to urgently establish peace and order and protect citizens from violent behavior by the police, and called on citizens to exercise maximum restraint.
- Saint Kitts and Nevis and Serbia, October 13, 2021: the Minister of Foreign Affairs of Serbia, Nikola Selaković, met with the foreign Minister of Foreign Affairs of Saint Kitts and Nevis, Mark Brantley, and on that occasion briefed him on the situation in Kosovo in light of today's ethnically motivated actions by Pristina.
- United States, October 13, 2021: Richard Grenell, the envoy of US President Donald Trump for the Belgrade-Pristina dialogue, stated that then President Joe Biden must not remain silent on the situation in North Kosovo and called for respect for the Brussels Agreement. "This is dangerous and reckless", Grenell said about the situation in Kosovo.
- Germany, October 13, 2021: Ambassador to Pristina Jörn Rohde commented on a statement by Goran Rakić, who named aith the term 'Kristallnacht' (which is used to refer to a Nazi pogrom) the incidents in North Kosovo. "Stop! Comparing today's police action to 'Kristallnacht' is unacceptable. Such comparisons contribute to distorting and denying the narrative about the Holocaust", Rohde said.
- United States and Serbia, October 13, 2021: Serbian Ambassador to the United States Marko Đurić said that the violence in North Kosovo is an attempt by the Prime Minister of Kosovo, Albin Kurti, to demonstrate force ahead of Sunday's local elections and called on the Kosovo Force (KFOR) and the North Atlantic Treaty Organization (NATO) to respond urgently and deploy forces to prevent further violence.
- Serbia, October 13, 2021: Prince Filip Karađorđević descrived the incidents in North Kosovo as "very sad and frightening". "The fact is that the Kosovo Force (KFOR) and the European Union Rule of Law Mission in Kosovo (EULEX) are passively observing the unacceptable harassment and intimidation of the Serbian community, which is in an increasingly worse position year after year, month after month", Prince Filip pointed out.
- European Union, October 14, 2021: European Parliament Rapporteur for Kosovo Viola von Cramon criticized the head of European diplomacy Josep Borrell for his position on yesterday's action by Pristina in North Kosovo. Von Cramon called on Borrell to "criticize states where the rule of law is not implemented" and added that the European Union (EU) should "support those who fight organized crime and corruption".
- United States, October 14, 2021: American Ambassador to Belgrade Anthony Godfrey says that the country is closely monitoring the situation in North Mitrovica. When asked if they were surprised by the action of the Kosovo Police and whether he thinks such moves are preventing any progress in the process of normalizing relations, the ambassador says that at this time there is not enough information about the latest incident.
- Russia, October 14, 2021: A spokeswoman of the Ministry of Foreign Affairs of Russia, Maria Zakharova, demands that the North Atlantic Treaty Organization (NATO) contingent "restrain radical Kosovo Albanians", pointing out that the "radical government" of Albin Kurti does not consider itself to have any obligations, openly ignoring even those on to the West, which continues to lobby for international legalization of Kosovo's illegal, unilaterally declared independence, she added.
- United Kingdom, October 14, 2021: The British Embassy in Kosovo has spoken of its support for the Kosovo government action to tackle organised crime which resulted in an attack on police and journalists by Kosovo Serbs. "Acting against organised crime is in the interests of all citizens of Kosovo and we support the Kosovan Government in upholding the rule of law throughout Kosovo", they wrote on Twitter.
- European Union, October 21, 2021: European Parliament Rapporteur for Kosovo Viola von Cramon explained that she wants Kosovo Serbs to be protected as much as possible, responding to a statement by the Serbian Director of the Office for Kosovo, Petar Petković, who stated that von Cramon is making Serbs in Kosovo legitimate targets. "I want Kosovo Serbs — both south and north to the Ibar — to be protected as much as possible. So that there is no more Oliver Ivanovic case, which due to the lack of rule of law or some other 'foggy day' in the north remains unresolved", von Cramon wrote on Twitter.

=== Meeting in Raška ===
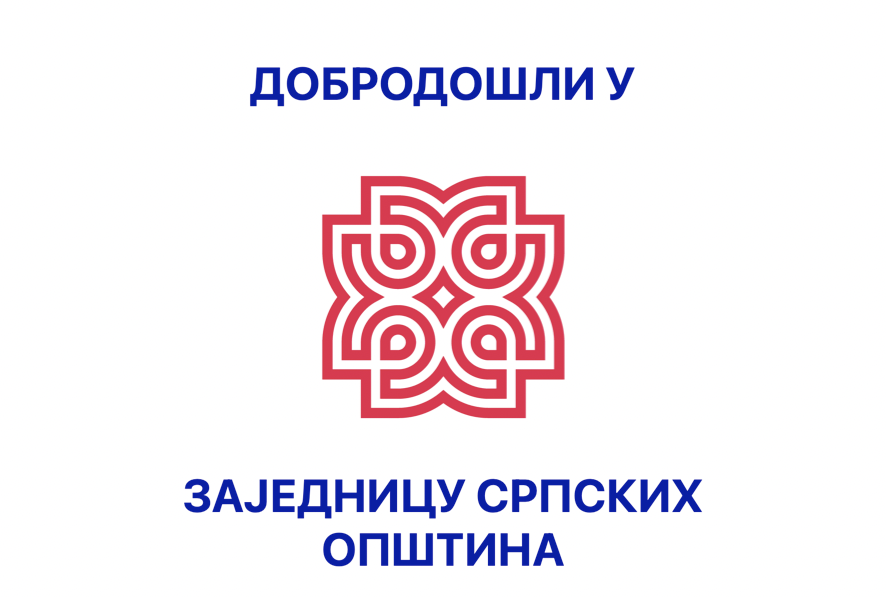
Banner put up by Serbs in support of the protests in Štrpce, Novo Brdo, and Ranilug, citing: "Welcome to the Community of Serb Municipalities".

The President of Serbia, Aleksandar Vučić, visited the city of Raška, where he met with Serbian political representatives from Kosovo. The leader of the Serb List, Goran Rakić, said that if something like this happens again "there will be general resistance from the Serbian people". A large number of Serbs from Kosovo spoke before Vučić, requesting that he promises to "stand with and defend" them. He responded by saying "whatever happens, Serbia and Belgrade will be there with you". "If something like this happens next time, we will put up general resistance. Whatever that means and however you understand it, President. We will defend ourselves with everything we have at our disposal", Rakić then said. The Minister of Internal Affairs of Serbia, Aleksandar Vulin, declared today that Vučić "passed the exam and once again entered the nation's memory", referring to the developments in North Kosovo.

== See also ==
- 2021 North Kosovo crisis
- Brussels agreement (2013)
- Community of Serb Municipalities
- Albin Kurti
- Kosovo Police
