= Kosovo unrests =

Kosovo unrests may refer to:

- 1981 protests in Kosovo
- Insurgency in Kosovo (1995–1998)
- Kosovo War
- 2004 unrest in Kosovo
- 2008 unrest in Kosovo
- North Kosovo crisis (disambiguation)
  - North Kosovo crisis (2011–2013)
  - 2021 North Kosovo crisis
  - 2022 North Kosovo crisis
