= 2021 North Kosovo crisis =

Protest against Kosovo's Serbian license plate ban

- Part of the Kosovo dispute
- Locations of barricades and traffic blocks are shown as and bolded, while locations of attacked offices are shown as and italicised. Pristina is the capital city of Kosovo. North Kosovo is highlighted in red
- Date: 20 September – 2 October 2021 (1 week and 5 days)
- Location: North Kosovo
- Caused by: Opposition to the Kosovan government's decision to ban Serbian license plates
- Goals: Legalisation of Serbian license plates
- Methods: Border-crossing blockades; Protests; Riots
- Result: Interim agreement in Brussels: Withdrawal of Kosovo Police from Jarinje and Brnjak; KFOR started patrolling North Kosovo; Agreement on sticker regime; Serbian plates again legal in Kosovo, Kosovar plates legal in Serbia, as long as the national symbols are covered with a sticker; End of protests

Parties
Kosovo Serbs: Serb List	Kosovo: Kosovo Police

Lead figures
Milan Radoičić; Goran Rakić; Igor Simić; Supported by: Aleksandar Vučić; Nebojša Stefanović	Albin Kurti; Xhelal Sveçla; Diplomatic support: Edi Rama

Number
Hundreds of civilian protesters	

Triggered by the Government of Kosovo's decision to reciprocally ban Serbian license plates, a series of protests by Serbs in North Kosovo—consisting mostly of blocking traffic near border crossings— began on 20 September 2021. The ban meant that individuals who owned vehicles with Serbian license plates in Kosovo would have had to switch for Kosovar license plates at a government vehicle registration center. The ban was intended to mirror a prohibition against Kosovar license plates that had been imposed by Serbia since 2008. The Government of Serbia does not recognise Kosovo's independence and considers the Kosovo–Serbia border to be temporary.

During the crisis, two government vehicle registration centers in Zvečan and Zubin Potok were targeted by arsonists. The protests caused Kosovo–Serbia relations—which had been improving—to worsen, and led to the Serbian Armed Forces being placed on heightened alert. Both sides accused the other of great overreach. International powers, particularly the European Union and NATO, called for de-escalation, while Russia criticised Kosovo.

On 30 September, an agreement was reached to end the license plate ban, taking effect on 4 October. In return, the protesters agreed to disperse. Pursuant to the terms of the agreement, Kosovar license plates in Serbia and Serbian license plates in had their national symbols and country codes covered with a temporary sticker. Following delays, the regime ended in 2024 with effective mutual recognition.

== Background ==
North Kosovo is majority Serb and has been a region largely opposed to an independent Kosovo, with frequent protests since Kosovo declared independence. It has not recognised the Government of Kosovo and acted independently of it prior to the 2013 Brussels Agreement. According to the agreement, by 2016 the Community of Serb Municipalities was to be formed. The Community would be a self–governing association of municipalities with a Serbian majority in Kosovo. As of 2021, it had not yet formed, because the Government of Kosovo suspended the application of this part of the Brussels Agreement. Kosovo's Constitutional Court declared it to be unconstitutional.

Until 2011 Serbia issued Serbian license plates for towns in North Kosovo. In the 2011 round of Belgrade–Pristina negotiations, Serbia agreed to stop issuing these license plates. Part of the deal was that they should be changed for Republic of Kosovo (RKS) license plates or neutral Kosovo (KS) plates. The KS license plates do not bear any state symbols. Serbia has allowed KS license plates on its territory, but not RKS license plates. The agreement lasted 5 years until 2016, when it was expected that a better solution would be found. The same terms were renewed on 14 September 2016 and were valid until 14 September 2021.

Following Vetëvendosje's victory in the 2021 Kosovan parliamentary election, the government renewed reciprocity measures. The previous government, led by the Democratic League of Kosovo, scrapped many reciprocity measures in June 2020, which Avdullah Hoti declared was to remove barriers to dialogue, under pressure by the US and the EU. The main policy that was scrapped and has not been brought back since, was a 100% tariff rate on products from Bosnia and Herzegovina and Serbia. It was implemented in November 2018, as a response to their perceived hostility towards Kosovo. While it lasted, there were no EU-mediated dialogues between Serbia and Kosovo.

After 14 September 2021, the conditions remained the same, but a ban on Serbian license plates was issued in Kosovo on 20 September 2021. The KS license plates, used by some vehicles, were also invalidated by the Government of Kosovo. This affected some of their owners who often had to travel across the Kosovo–Serbia border.

The motive of the Kosovan government's ban had been to mirror the former policy of the Serbian government that banned Republic of Kosovo (RKS) license plates. Vehicles with RKS license plates in Serbia had to switch them for temporary Serbian plates. Vehicles with Serbian license plates in Kosovo were supposed to, up to the 30 September 2021 Agreement in Brussels, have their Serbian license plates taken off and switched for Kosovar license plates at a government vehicle registration center. Drivers who had visited the country with Serbian license plates had to get temporary plates. The temporary plates cost a 5 euro (2021 value) tax and were valid for 60 days. The ban would have reportedly impacted around 9,500 vehicles with Serbian license plates in North Kosovo which would have had to wear permanent Kosovar license plates. This was originally supposed to have been done after the 2011 agreement, but no attempts were made to enforce it.

== Protests ==
The protests organised by the Kosovo Serbs against the Kosovan government began on 20 September 2021. On the same day, over 20 vehicles of the Kosovo Police, of which over 10 were armoured, came to the site of the protests. Hundreds of local ethnic Serbs had been protesting daily. They were blocking the roads leading to the two border crossings with Serbia in North Kosovo, near Jarinje and Brnjak, with vehicles and barricades reinforced by gravel. On 23 September 2021 the vehicle traffic block on the Mitrovica–Raška road in Jarinje reached 3 kilometres in length. Protesters were sleeping next to the protest sites in improvised tents. Representatives of the Serb List also attended the protests.

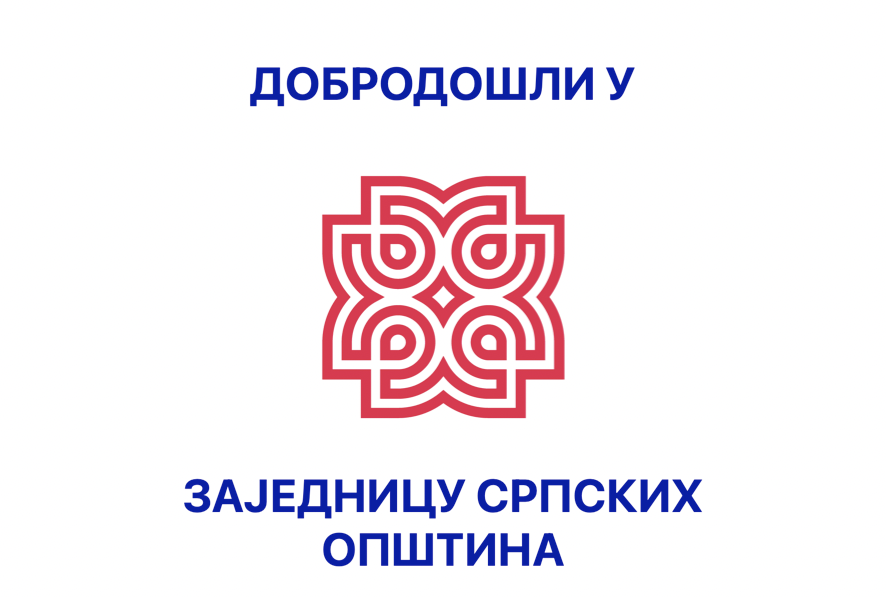
Banner put up by Serbs in support of the protests in Štrpce, Novo Brdo, and Ranilug, citing: "Welcome to the Community of Serb Municipalities"

The protests had been mostly nonviolent. However, on 25 September 2021, two government vehicle registration centers in Zvečan and Zubin Potok were attacked by arson, and reportedly with hand grenades that failed to explode. On 23 September 2021, it was reported that the Kosovo Police injured three Serbs who were not protesting, two of whom were hospitalized. The Kosovo Police denied involvement and said that it's "disinformation". According to the agreement between Kosovo and Serbia mediated by the European Union (EU) Representative for the Balkan–Pristina Dialogue Miroslav Lajčák in Brussels, reached on 30 September 2021, the Kosovar special police withdrew by 16:00 local time on 2 October 2021. Along with this, the barricades set up by the protesters were removed by local Serbs and the traffic blocks ended, leading to border traffic resuming. The Kosovo Force (KFOR), a NATO-led international peacekeeping force, replaced the police units and was present for the next two weeks.

== Government responses ==
=== Serbia ===
The decision to ban Serbian license plates and the ongoing protests prompted Serbian authorities to raise the combat readiness of the Serbian Armed Forces on the border with Kosovo. The army started transporting military equipment to the border area, including its fighter jets, helicopters, and tanks, on 26 September 2021. The President of Serbia Aleksandar Vučić has described Kosovo's license plate ban as a "criminal action". He made the withdrawal of Kosovar special police a condition for starting EU-mediated negotiations to resolve the dispute.

=== Kosovo ===
The prime minister of Kosovo Albin Kurti has accused Serbia of "inciting and supporting" the attacks on government buildings. He also accused Serbia of "exploiting Kosovo citizens to provoke a serious international conflict." The attacks were described by the Interior Ministry of Kosovo as "having terrorist elements". The mayors of majority Serbian municipalities on 27 September also requested a withdrawal of the units and more KFOR troops, citing the incident on 23 September 2021 when 3 Serbs were injured as a concern. The special police units withdrew as part of the 30 September 2021 Agreement in Brussels on 2 October 2021.

== Agreement to end the ban ==
On 30 September 2021 an agreement was reached in Brussels that effectively ended the ban on Serbian license plates, starting 08:00 local time, 4 October 2021. The agreement also effectively ended the ban on Kosovar license plates in Serbia. The agreement was intended as a temporary solution. The solution is to cover the national symbols of Kosovo on Kosovar RKS license plates in Serbia, as well as to cover the national symbols of Serbia on Serbian license plates in Kosovo and their country codes RKS and SRB with a sticker. A working group was formed and met on 21 October 2021 in Brussels for the first time, to try and find a permanent solution in accordance with EU standards. Within 6 months, the negotiators and delegations were supposed to present their proposals for the permanent solution.

On 21 April 2022, when the solution was supposed to have been found, the regime was extended. Kosovo maintains that reciprocity must be followed in any potential agreement, while Serbia denies this as it does not recognise Kosovo as an independent state. The EU urged for an agreement to be found quickly, despite the deadline passing.

== International reactions ==
On 26 September 2021 Russian diplomats together with the Serbian Defense Minister Nebojša Stefanović visited an inspection of Serbian forces in the military base of Rudnica. Rudnica is a few kilometres away from the Kosovo–Serbia border. In October, Russia deployed air defense forces to Serbia for a joint military exercise called "Slavic Shield 2021" to practise anti-aircraft actions. On 27 September 2021, KFOR stepped up the amount and duration of its patrols. The increase was most notable near the border crossings, where armored vehicles moved close to protesters' blockades.

The European Union High Representative for Foreign Affairs, the NATO Secretary General, the President of the European Council, and the President of the European Commission called for both parties to de–escalate and sit in talks following the increased tensions. On 27 September 2021, Spokeswoman of Russia's Foreign Ministry Maria Zakharova criticised the conduct of Kosovo. She has called for NATO and the EU mission to pressure Kosovo into retreating its security personnel as to "prevent escalation". On 27 September 2021, the Russian Embassy in Serbia has approved of the conduct of the Government of Serbia in the tensions, saying Serbia "is showing the greatest responsibility and restraint". Russia has described Kosovo's actions as "provocative".

== See also ==
- 2008 unrest in Kosovo
- North Kosovo crisis (2011–2013)
- 2012 North Kosovo referendum
