= Igor Simić =

Kosovar politician

MP Igor Simić Игор Симић
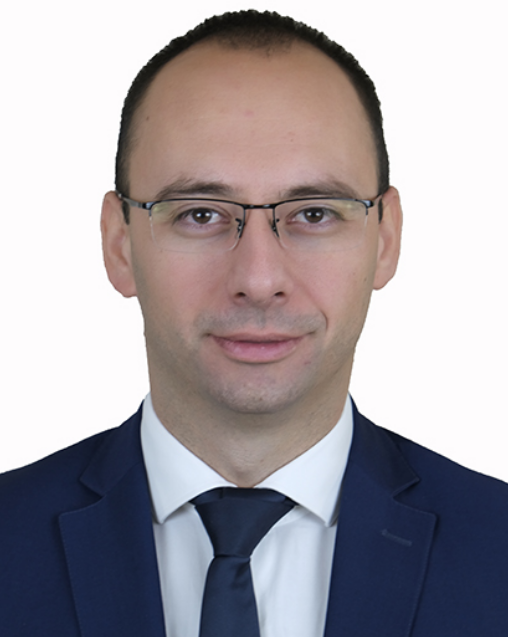

Member of the Assembly of the Republic of Kosovo
- Incumbent
- Assumed office 2017

Personal details
- Born: 25 May 1986 (age 40) Titova Mitrovica, SR Serbia, SFR Yugoslavia
- Party: Serb List (2016–present)
- Other political affiliations: Serbian Progressive Party (2016–present)
- Education: University of Priština

Igor Simić (Serbian Cyrillic: Игор Симић, Albanian: Igor Simiq; born 25 May 1986) is a Kosovo Serb politician who is a deputy in the Assembly of the Republic of Kosovo. He is a vice president and the spokesperson of the Serb List, a Serb minority party in Kosovo.

== Early life and career ==
He was born to a Serb family in 1986 in Titova Mitrovica (Kosovska Mitrovica / Mitrovica) which at the time was a part of the SFR Yugoslavia.

He graduated from the Faculty of Economics, University of Priština with the temporary seat in North Mitrovica and later he did doctoral studies at the same university and received his PhD and defended his doctoral dissertation in on the topic of the Community of Serb Municipalities. Currently he is an assistant at the Faculty of Economics, University of Priština and a member of the council at the Faculty of Law of the same university.

He is an executive director of the NGO "Sinergija". In 2015, Simic became the director of the supervisory board of the state-owned enterprise "Mreža Most" and then again in 2019.

Besides his native Serbian, he speaks English.

== Political career ==
Before joining the Serb List, and the Serbian Progressive Party in 2016, he was the spokesperson of the Civic Initiative "Freedom, Democracy, Justice" (SDP) which was led by Oliver Ivanović, who at that time was in prison and was assassinated in 2018.

After the 2017 Kosovan parliamentary elections, Simić became a deputy in the Assembly of the Republic of Kosovo and after the 2019 elections he was elected again. He serves in the Parliamentary Committee for Rights and Interests of Communities and Returns as well as the Committee for Local Governance, Public Administration, Regional Development and Media.

In 2018, Igor Simić was elected vice president of the Serb List.

In November 2019, Simić said that Serbia continues to fund parallel structures and that the Serbian state provides salaries to 40 thousand Serbian citizens in Kosovo. He also denounced claims that North Kosovo is more dangerous than other parts of Kosovo and that young people are not leaving Kosovo because of the Serb List, but because of the Kosovar political class.

On 5 November 2022, all the ten deputies of the Serb List, including Simić, resigned from the Assembly of Kosovo.
