= Assembly of the Community of Municipalities, Autonomous Province of Kosovo and Metohija =

Assembly of the Community of Municipalities of the Autonomous Province of Kosovo and Metohija Скупштина Заједнице општина Аутономне Покрајине Косово и Метохија Skupština Zajednice opština Autonomne Pokrajine Kosovo i Metohija

Type
- Type: unicameral

History
- Founded: 2008
- Disbanded: 2013

Leadership
- President: Radovan Ničić
- Seats: 45

Elections
- First election: 11 May 2008
- Last election: 11 May 2008

Meeting place
- North Mitrovica

Website
- http://www.sapkim.org/

The Assembly of the Community of Municipalities of the Autonomous Province of Kosovo and Metohija (Serbian: Скупштина Заједнице општина Аутономне Покрајине Косово и Метохија / Skupština Zajednice opština Autonomne Pokrajine Kosovo i Metohija), was the assembly of the association of local governments created by the parallel municipal authorities in Kosovo elected in the May 11, 2008 municipal elections called by the Government of Serbia. It was created in North Mitrovica (North Kosovo) to represent the municipalities that defied the 2008 Kosovo declaration of independence. The Assembly was composed of 45 representatives delegated by 26 municipalities. The majority of delegates were ethnic Serbs, while some represented Gorani, Bosniak and Romani communities.

The assembly was not part of the government of the Republic of Kosovo and it was dissolved following the 2013 Brussels Agreement.

== History ==
The first session of the Assembly took place on May 11 and the inaugural meeting of the assembly occurred on Vidovdan, the feast day for St. Vitus, June 28 in 2008—a historically important date for Serbs that commemorates the 1389 Battle of Kosovo. Radovan Ničić is the President of the Assembly.

== Composition ==
Composition in 2008

The seats in the Assembly are divided as follows:

- Serbian Radical Party – 17
- Democratic Party of Serbia – 13
- Socialist Party of Serbia – 4
- Democratic Party – 3
- G17 Plus – 1
- Civic Initiative of Gora – 1
- Independent – 4

== International response ==
The elections which are basis for the Assembly were not recognised by the United Nations Mission in Kosovo (UNMIK) or the government of Kosovo. The creation of the Assembly has been condemned by President of Kosovo Fatmir Sejdiu as an act aimed at destabilising Kosovo, while UNMIK had said the creation of it was not a serious issue because the Assembly would not have an operative role.

== Post-Brussels developments ==
In September 2013, following the 2013 Brussels Agreement, according to which a self-governing association of municipalities with a Serb majority population is to be formed- the Community of Serb Municipalities, Serbia ended its support for the Assembly. Serbia appointed temporary leaders until the 2013 Kosovo municipal elections were completed. The Community of Serb Municipalities outlined in the 2013 Brussels Agreement is yet to be formed.

== See also ==
- Serbs in Kosovo
- Kosovo Serb enclaves
- Serbian National Council of Kosovo and Metohija
- Politics of Kosovo
- Community of Serb Municipalities
