= Grnčar =

Grnčar (Serbian Cyrillic: Грнчар) is a Serbo-Croatian toponym, derived from the word grnčar meaning "potter". It may refer to:

- Grnčar, Babušnica, village in Serbia
- Grnčar, Klokot, village in Kosovo
- Grnčar, Gusinje, village in Montenegro
- Grnčar (river in Montenegro)
- Grnčar (river in Kosovo)

== See also ==
- Grnčari
