= Municipalities of Kosovo =

Administrative division in Kosovo

Kosovo's municipalities

A municipality (Albanian: komuna; Serbian: општина, romanized: opština) is the basic administrative division in Kosovo and constitutes the only level of power in local governance. There are 38 municipalities in Kosovo; 30 of which have an Albanian ethnic majority, 7 Serb and 1 Turkish. After the 2013 Brussels Agreement, signed by the governments of Kosovo and Serbia, an agreement was made to create a Community of Serb Municipalities, which would operate within Kosovo's legal framework. Since 2013, the agreement has not been fulfilled by Kosovo's authorities, calling upon its constitution and territorial integrity.

== List of municipalities ==
Emblem Stema Amblem	Municipality Komuna Opština	Area	Map Location	Settlements Vendbanimet Naselja	Population (2011)	Population (2024)	Change (2011-2024)	Mayor Kryetar/e Gradonačelnik	Party
	Deçan; Dečani / Дечани	293.97 km^{2} (113.50 sq mi)		37	40,019	27,775	−30.60%	Bashkim Ramosaj	AAK
	Dragash; Dragaš / Драгаш	433.85 km^{2} (167.51 sq mi)		36	33,997	28,896	−15.00%	Bexhet Xheladini	LDK
	Ferizaj; Uroševac / Урошевац	344.61 km^{2} (133.05 sq mi)		45	108,610	109,255	+0.59%	Agim Aliu	PDK
	Fushë Kosova; Kosovo Polje / Косово Поље	84.09 km^{2} (32.47 sq mi)		16	34,827	63,949	+83.62%	Valon Prebreza	VV
	Gjakova; Đakovica / Ђаковица	586.62 km^{2} (226.50 sq mi)		88	94,556	78,699	−16.77%	Ardian Gjini	AAK
	Gjilan; Gnjilane / Гњилане	391.84 km^{2} (151.29 sq mi)		49	90,178	82,980	−7.98%	Alban Hyseni	VV
	Drenas; Glogovac / Глоговац	275.63 km^{2} (106.42 sq mi)		35	58,531	48,079	−17.86%	Ramiz Lladrovci	PDK
	Graçanicë; Gračanica / Грачаница	122.41 km^{2} (47.26 sq mi)		17	10,675	18,486	+73.17%	Srđan Popović	LS
	Hani i Elezit; Elez Han / Елез Хан	83.11 km^{2} (32.09 sq mi)		11	9,403	8,533	−9.25%	Mehmet Ballazhi	PDK
	Istog; Istok / Исток	454.36 km^{2} (175.43 sq mi)		50	39,289	33,008	−15.99%	Ilir Ferati	LDK
	Junik / Јуник	77.78 km^{2} (30.03 sq mi)		3	6,084	3,943	−35.19%	Ruzhdi Shehu	LDK
	Kaçanik; Kačanik Качаник	211.28 km^{2} (81.58 sq mi)		31	33,409	27,716	−17.04%	Sabedin Vishi	PDK
	Kamenica; Kosovska Kamenica / Косовска Каменица	416.61 km^{2} (160.85 sq mi)		58	36,085	22,868	−36.63%	Kadri Rahimaj	VV
	Klinë; Klina / Клина	309.02 km^{2} (119.31 sq mi)		54	38,496	30,503	−20.76%	Zenun Elezaj	AAK
	Kllokot; Klokot / Клокот	23.39 km^{2} (9.03 sq mi)		4	2,556	3,041	+18.97%	Vladan Bogdanoviq	LS
	Leposaviq; Leposavić / Лепосавић	539.05 km^{2} (208.13 sq mi)		75	13,773	3,185	−76.88%	Lulzim Hetemi	VV
	Lipjan; Lipljan / Липљан	338.41 km^{2} (130.66 sq mi)		62	57,605	55,044	−4.45%	Imri Ahmeti	LDK
	Malisheva; Mališevo / Малишево	306.42 km^{2} (118.31 sq mi)		44	54,613	43,888	−19.64%	Ragip Begaj	NISMA
	Mamusha; Mamuša / Мамуша	10.94 km^{2} (4.22 sq mi)		1	5,507	5,607	+1.82%	Abdulhadi Krasniç	KDTP
	Mitrovica; Kosovska Mitrovica / Косовска Митровица	329.35 km^{2} (127.16 sq mi)		47	71,909	64,742	−9.97%	Faton Peci	PDK
	North Mitrovica; Severna Kosovska Mitrovica / Северна Косовска Митровица	6.83 km^{2} (2.64 sq mi)		1	12,326	2,326	−81.13%	Erden Atiq	VV
	Novobërda; Novo Brdo / Ново Брдо	203.98 km^{2} (78.76 sq mi)		26	6,729	4,493	−33.23%	Svetislav Ivanović	LS
	Obiliq; Obilić / Обилић	104.84 km^{2} (40.48 sq mi)		20	21,549	22,815	+5.87%	Xhafer Gashi	LDK
	Partesh; Parteš / Партеш	28.67 km^{2} (11.07 sq mi)		3	1,787	3,240	+81.31%	Dragan Petković	LS
	Peja; Peć / Пећ	602.63 km^{2} (232.68 sq mi)		79	96,450	82,745	−14.21%	Gazmend Muhaxheri	LDK
	Podujevë; Podujevo / Подујево	632.59 km^{2} (244.24 sq mi)		77	88,499	70,975	−19.80%	Shpejtim Bulliqi	VV
	Prishtina; Priština / Приштина	523.13 km^{2} (201.98 sq mi)		43	198,897	227,466	+14.36%	Përparim Rama	LDK
	Prizren / Призрен	626.86 km^{2} (242.03 sq mi)		76	177,781	147,246	−17.18%	Shaqir Totaj	PDK
	Rahovec; Orahovac / Ораховац	275.90 km^{2} (106.53 sq mi)		36	56,208	41,799	−25.64%	Smajl Latifi	AAK
	Ranillug; Ranilug / Ранилуг	77.62 km^{2} (29.97 sq mi)		13	3,866	2,481	−35.83%	Vladica Aritonović	LS
	Skenderaj; Srbica / Србица	374.37 km^{2} (144.55 sq mi)		49	50,858	40,664	−20.04%	Sami Lushtaku	PDK
	Suhareka; Suva Reka / Сува Река	361.04 km^{2} (139.40 sq mi)		41	59,722	45,749	−23.40%	Bali Muharremaj	AAK
	Shtërpca; Štrpce / Штрпце	247.70 km^{2} (95.64 sq mi)		16	6,949	10,771	+55.00%	Bratislav Nikolić	LS
	Shtime; Štimlje / Штимље	134.42 km^{2} (51.90 sq mi)		23	27,324	24,308	−11.04%	Qemajl Aliu	VV
	Vitia; Vitina / Витина	269.69 km^{2} (104.13 sq mi)		39	46,987	35,566	−24.31%	Sokol Haliti	LDK
	Vushtrri; Vučitrn / Вучитрн	344.85 km^{2} (133.15 sq mi)		67	69,870	61,528	−11.94%	Ferit Idrizi	PDK
	Zubin Potoku; Zubin Potok / Зубин Поток	334.38 km^{2} (129.10 sq mi)		61	6,616	763	−88.47% (Note: Due to the boycott by most municipalities in the north in the 2011 Kosovo census, the exact number of the population of Leposavić, North Mitrovica, Zubin Potok and Zvečan is unknown. Estimates are taken according to a 2014 OSCE report.) (Note: Due to political tension the Northern Municipalities of Kosovo saw a boycott of the population registration in 2024)	Izmir Zeqiri	PDK
	Zveçan; Zvečan / Звечан	123.01 km^{2} (47.49 sq mi)		35	7,481	434	−94.20%	Ilir Peci	PDK
—	38	10,905.25 km^{2} (4,210.54 sq mi)	—	1,468	1,780,021	1,585,566	−10.92%	—	—

== Powers of municipalities ==
All municipalities have the following competences, as regulated by Law Nr. 03/L-040 of the Constitution of Kosovo:

1. Local economic development.
2. Urban and rural planning.
3. Land use and development.
4. Implementation of building regulations and building control standards.
5. Local environmental protection.
6. Provision and maintenance of public services and utilities, including water supply, sewers and drains, sewage treatment, waste management, local roads, local transport and local heating schemes.
7. Local emergency response.
8. Provision of public pre-primary, primary and secondary education, including registration and licensing of educational institutions, recruitment, payment of salaries and training of education instructors and administrators.
9. Provision of public primary health care.
10. Provision of family and other social welfare services, such as care for the vulnerable, foster care, child care, elderly care, including registration and licensing of these care centers, recruitment, payment of salaries and training of social welfare professionals.
11. Public housing.
12. Public health.
13. Licensing of local services and facilities, including those related to entertainment, cultural and leisure activities, food, lodging, markets, street vendors, local public transportation and taxis.
14. Naming of roads, streets and other public places.
15. Provision and maintenance of public parks and spaces.
16. Tourism.
17. Cultural and leisure activities.
18. Any matter which is not explicitly excluded from their competence nor assigned to other authorities.

=== Community of Serb Municipalities ===
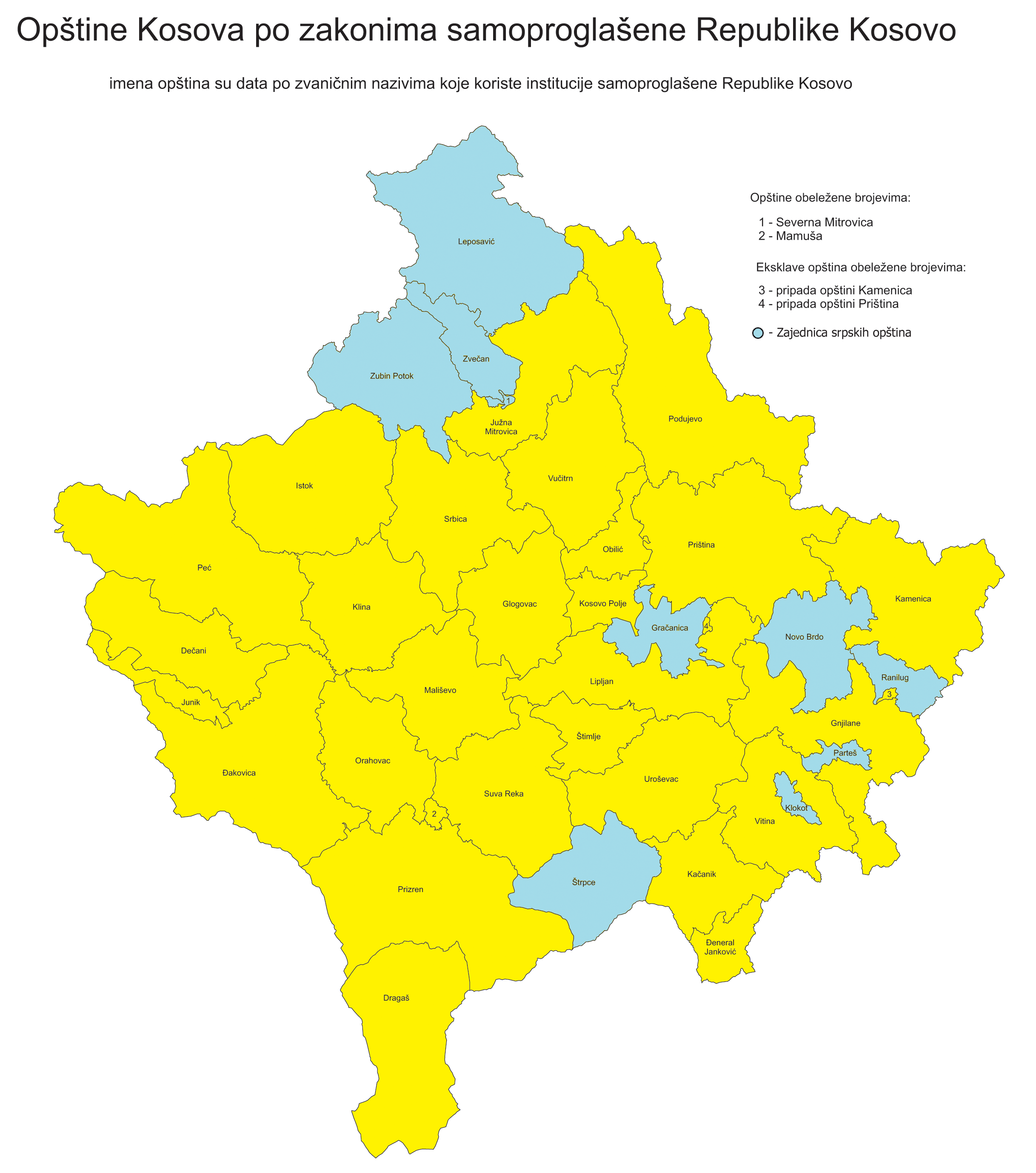
The planned Community of Serb Municipalities in Kosovo

Municipalities with Serb majorities have additional powers over the appointment of local police commanders, religious and cultural heritage sites within their boundaries; some of them have competences over universities and secondary health which in non-Serb-majority municipalities are a matter for central government (and, through the right of association of municipalities, even those Serb-majority municipalities which are not specifically given these powers may exercise them in association with those that do).

The 2013 Brussels Agreement signed by the Government of Kosovo and the Government of Serbia contains provisions for the formation of a Community of Serb Municipalities (Serbian: Заједница српских општина / Zajednica srpskih opština; Albanian: Asociacioni i komunave serbe) It was expected to be created in 2015, but its formation has been postponed over conflicts about extent of powers.

== Former municipalities ==
Between 1990 and 2000, in the Autonomous Province of Kosovo and Metohija, there were the following additional municipalities:

- Gora
- Opolje (1990–1992, later part of Prizren)

In 2000 both were merged into the new municipality of Dragash. The number of municipalities remained at 30 until 2005, when the new municipality of Malisheva was formed, by taking territories from the municipalities of Rahovec (District of Gjakova), Suhareka (District of Prizren), Klina (District of Peja) and Drenas (District of Pristina).

== See also ==
- Administrative divisions of Kosovo
- Districts of Kosovo
- Cities and towns in Kosovo
- Populated places in Kosovo
- Community of Serb Municipalities
