= Klokot =

Klokot: Klokot or Kllokoti (Albanian) Klokot or Клокот (Serbian)
- Town and municipality
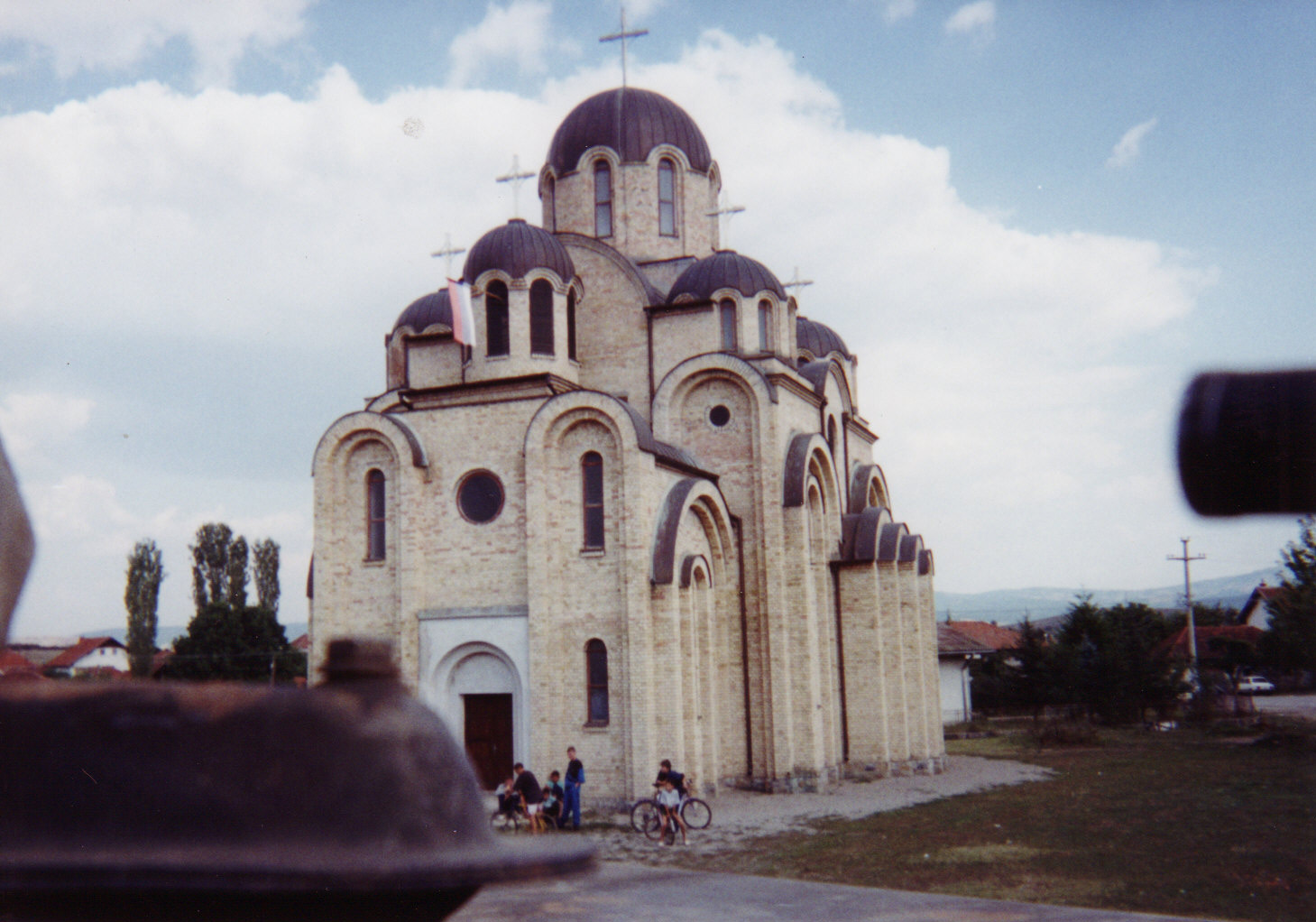
- Orthodox Church in Klokot

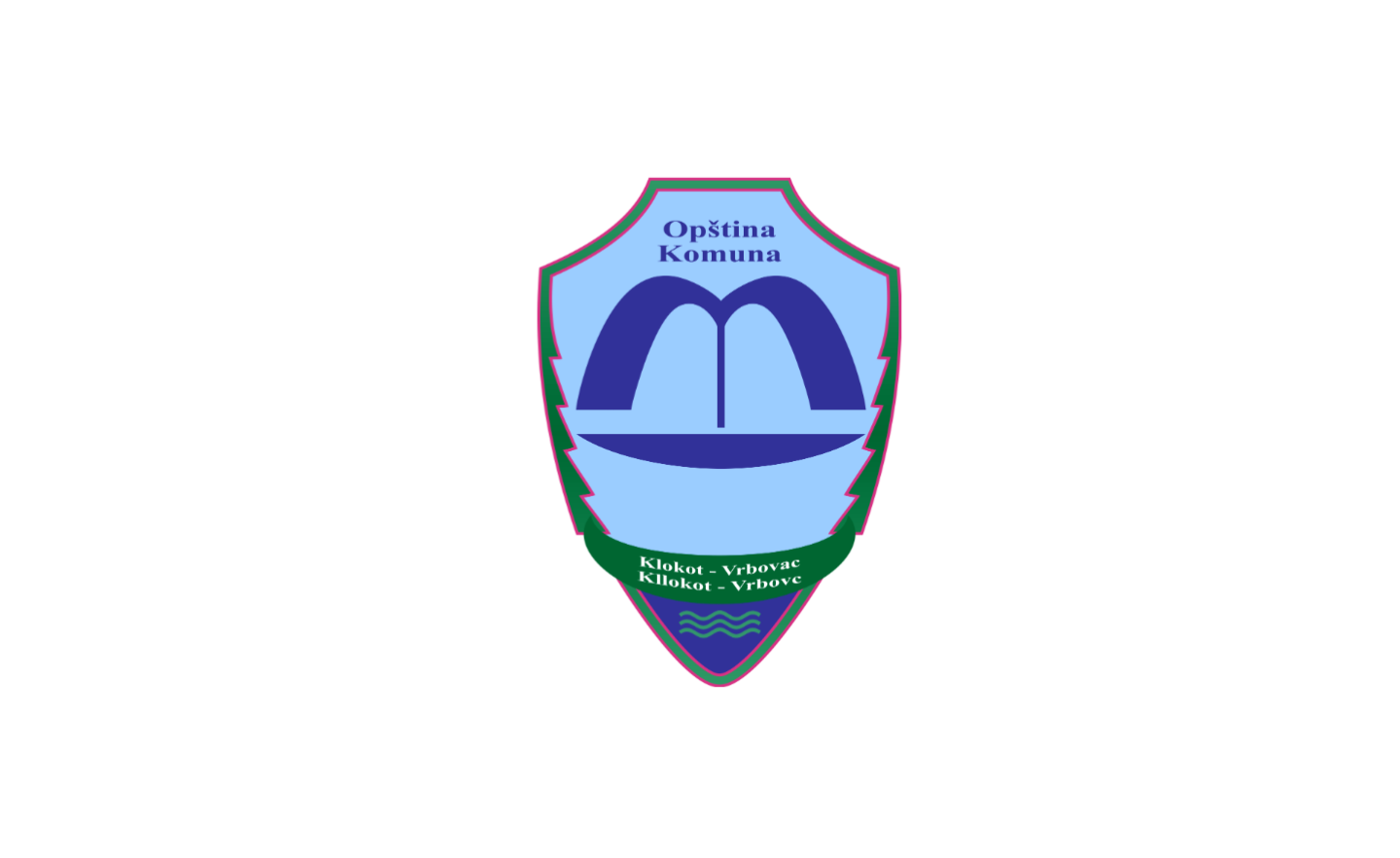
- Flag Emblem
- Interactive map of Klokot
- Location within Kosovo
- Coordinates: 42°22′N 21°23′E
- Country: Kosovo
- District: Gjilan
- Municipality: 8 January 2010
- Seat: Klokot

Government
  - Mayor: Vladan Bogdanović (SL)

Area
  - Municipality: 23.36 km^{2} (9.02 sq mi)
  - Rank: 36th in Kosovo
- Elevation: 490 m (1,610 ft)

Population (2024)
  - Municipality: 3,041
  - Rank: 34th in Kosovo
  - Density: 130.2/km^{2} (337.2/sq mi)
  - Urban: 1,459
  - Ethnicity: 55.67% Albanian; 43.96% Serbs
- Postal code: 61050
- Area code: +381 64
- Vehicle registration: 06
- Website: kllokot.rks-gov.net

Klokot (Serbian Cyrillic: Клокот) or Kllokot (Albanian definite form: Kllokoti) is a town and municipality in the District of Gjilan in southeastern Kosovo. The municipality has a population of 3,041 inhabitants. It is one of the smallest municipalities of Kosovo, in terms of area and population. The municipality was established on 8 January 2010, the settlements having been part of the municipality of Viti. The seat of the municipality is in the town of Klokot.

== Geography ==
Klokot is situated in the geographical region of Anamorava, in the southeastern part of Kosovo. The town is around 5 km (3.1 mi) away from Viti, 15 km (9.3 mi) from Gjilan and 20 km (12 mi) from Ferizaj.

The municipality has a cadastral area of 2,336 hectares (5,770 acres) or 23.36 km^{2} (9.02 sq mi). The municipality includes the town of Klokot and three villages:

- Klokot (Albanian: Kllokot; Serbian: Клокот)
- Mogila (Albanian: Mogillë; Serbian: Могила)
- Vrbovac (Albanian: Vërboc; Serbian: Врбовац)
- Grnčar (Albanian: Gërnçar; Serbian: Грнчар)

== History ==
On 16 August 1999, after the Kosovo War, a mortar attack carried out by Albanians killed two Serb civilians in the village. There had earlier that month been two mortar attacks.

In August 2002, explosive devices planted in Klokot destroyed five Serb houses, with several injuries, including two American KFOR soldiers.

The municipality of Klokot was officially established on 8 January 2010, previously being part of the Viti Municipality. The seat of the municipality is in Klokot. The municipality was formed based on the Ahtisaari plan for decentralization of Kosovo which called for the establishment of a municipality with Serbian majority within the Viti municipality. After the Brussels Agreement of 2013, representatives of Serbia and Kosovo agreed that the municipality was to become part of the Community of Serb Municipalities. Part of the agreement which pertained to the creation of the Association of Serbian municipalities was deemed unconstitutional by the Constitutional Court of Kosovo and since then the agreement has been blocked.

Between 2014 and March 2016, 30 Serb families with 124 members have left the municipality.

== Politics ==
The first municipal elections were held on 15 November 2009. 25.4% of the local voters, mostly Serbs, participated in the elections. Serb Saša Mirković was elected mayor. Out of 15 members of the municipal assembly, ten were elected from the Serb Independent Liberal Party, and five from the Albanian Democratic League of Kosovo. In November 2017, Božidar Dejanović of the Serb List became the mayor of Klokot.

In the 2021 local elections, after the second round, the Serb List candidate Vladan Bogdanović was chosen as the new mayor of Klokot with 1,029 out of 1867 or 55,12% of the votes.

== Demographics ==
According to the last census of 2024 by the Kosovo Agency of Statistics, the town of Klokot has a population of 1,459 inhabitants while the municipality has a population of 3,041 inhabitants.

Historical population
Year	Pop.	±% p.a.
1948	3,094	—
1953	3,452	+2.21%
1961	3,593	+0.50%
1971	3,960	+0.98%
1981	4,149	+0.47%
1991	3,972	−0.44%
2011	2,556	−2.18%
2024	3,041	+1.35%
Source: Kosovo Agency of Statistics

The population of Klokot municipality consists of a majority of Albanians, who make up 55.67%, followed by Serbs 43.96%.

== Economy ==
The economy of the municipality of is mainly based on natural resources (mostly mineral water), tourism (two private spas), agriculture and small trade businesses. Klokot has some important hot-water springs that get up to 32 °C (90 °F). There are 29 registered private businesses operating in the municipality.

== Public services ==
There are three elementary schools in the municipality with 599 students and 33 teachers, one secondary school with 147 students and 13 teachers and one kindergarten with 15 children and 2 teachers (As of 2013). Two elementary schools follow Serbian curricula, while one follows Kosovo curricula. The St. Sava Elementary school in Klokot is attended by 250 students (As of 2001) and the secondary school is located in Vrbovac.

== Culture ==
The municipality has four Serbian Orthodox churches. The church in Grnčar was reported to have been mined and destroyed during the Kosovo conflict, and was later fully reconstructed. There is a mosque in village of Mogila which was not damaged during the conflict.

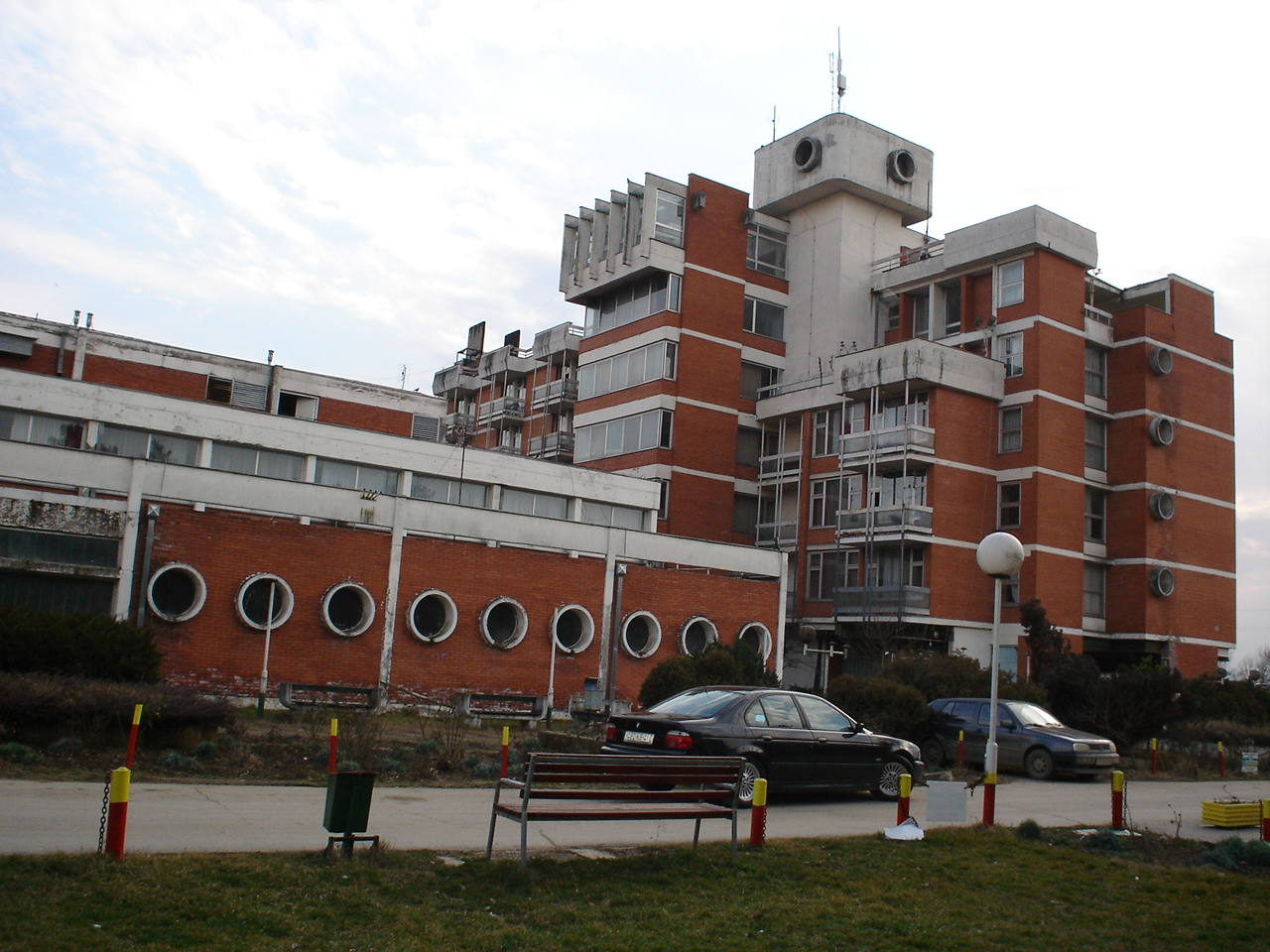
Spa Center in Klokot

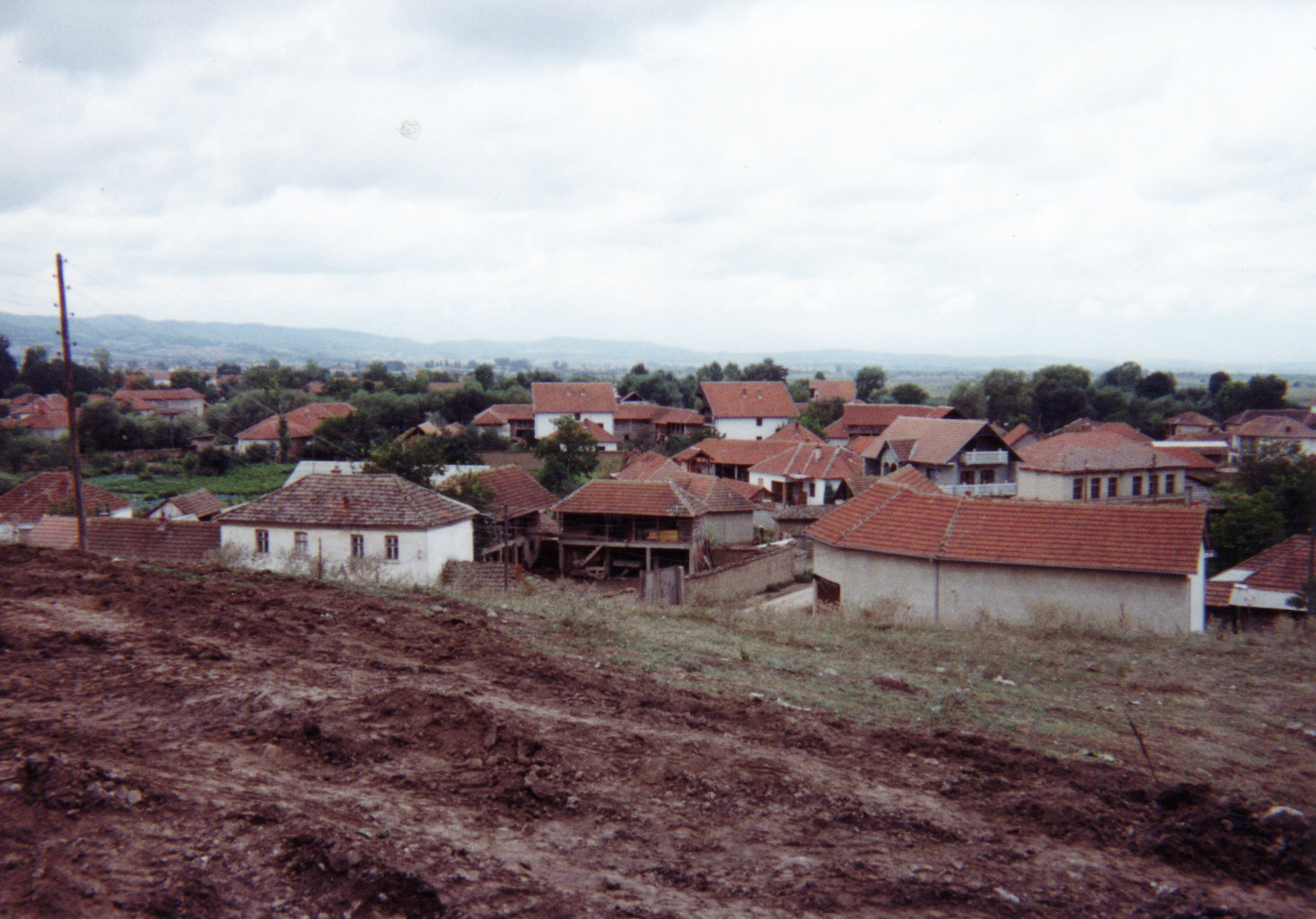
Houses in Klokot

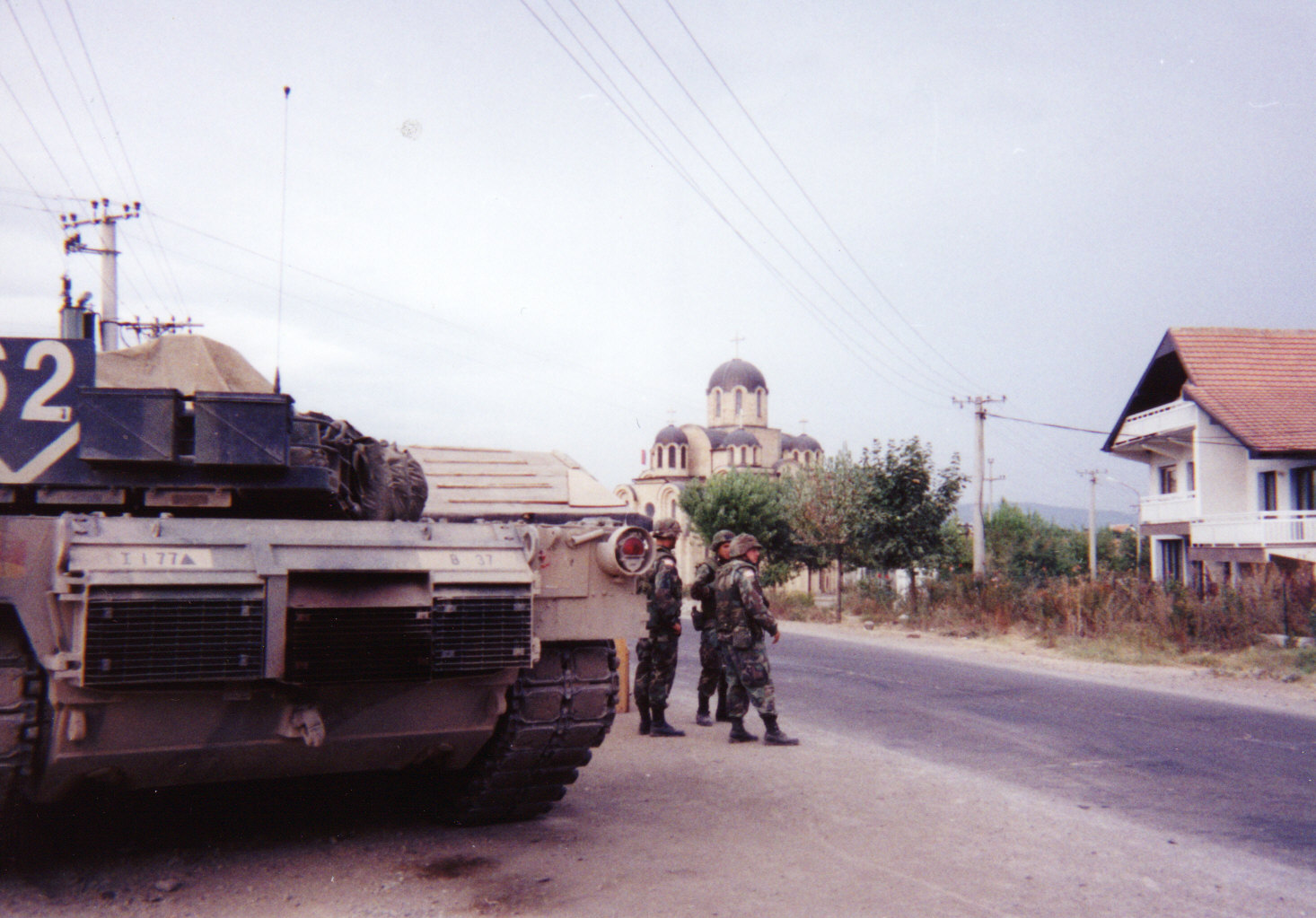
KFOR soldiers in Klokot in 1999

== See also ==
- Municipalities of Kosovo
- Cities and towns in Kosovo
- List of populated places in Kosovo

== Sources ==
- "Opština Klokot" (PDF). Instituti GAP.
- "Community Profile: Serb Community" (PDF). ECMI Kosovo. 2013. Archived from the original (PDF) on 2017-01-16.
