= Bratislav Nikolić =

Kosovan politician

- Братислав Николић
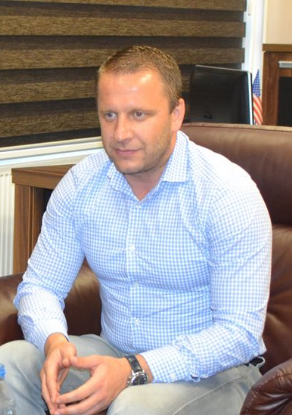

Mayor of Štrpce
- Incumbent
- Assumed office 2009

Personal details
- Born: 6 December 1979 (age 46) Gnjilane, SAP Kosovo, SR Serbia, SFR Yugoslavia
- Party: Independent Liberal Party (until 2015); Serb List (2015–present)
- Other political affiliations: Serbian Progressive Party (2015–present)

Bratislav Nikolić (Serbian Cyrillic: Братислав Николић; Albanian: Bratislav Nikoliq; born 6 December 1979) is a Kosovo Serb politician who has been serving as the mayor of Štrpce since 2009. He is a member of the Serb minority political party Serb List, as well as a member of the main board of the Serbian Progressive Party.

== Biography ==
Nikolić was born on 6 December 1979 in Gjilan.

He finished primary and secondary school in Štrpce, while he obtained his higher education in Niš, where he also did his master studies.

In the period from the end of high school and during his studies, he worked for the OSCE and the US Government in Kosovo, and he also participated in a mission in Iraq.

He has won several awards and recognitions from the US government for his work during his engagement in the mission in Iraq as well as in Kosovo.

== Political career ==
Initially, Nikolić was a member of the Independent Liberal Party and as a member of that party he got elected mayor of Štrpce after the 2009 local elections. He has been serving as the mayor ever since then.

In 2010, unidentified attackers fired shots at the home of Nikolić.

On 16 September 2015, Nikolić announced that 3,000 citizens of Štrpce joined the Serbian Progressive Party and the Serb List. He justified this by saying that then prime minister of Serbia and the president of the Progressives, Aleksandar Vučić "deals with specific problems of citizens, that he had difficult Brussels negotiations and that he secured the formation of the Community of Serb Municipalities".

== Personal life ==
Bratislav Nikolić has a black belt in karate and a fan of skiing.
