= Ničić =

Ničić is a surname of Serbian origin. People with that name include:

- Ilija Ničić (1922-2014), Serbian sport shooter who competed at the 1960 Summer Olympics
- Radovan Ničić (born 1971), Kosovan politician
