= Grnčar, Klokot =

Grnčar Грнчар (Serbian) Gërnçar (Albanian)
- Village
- Location in Kosovo
- Location: Kosovo
- District: Gjilan
- Municipality: Klokot

Population (2024)
  - Total: 304
- Time zone: UTC+1 (CET)
  - Summer (DST): UTC+2 (CEST)

Grnčar (Serbian Cyrillic: Грнчар, Albanian: Gërnçar), formerly Grnčare (Грнчаре, until 1975), is a village in the Klokot municipality, in southeastern Kosovo. It was formerly part of the Vitina municipality, then was together with Klokot and Vrbovac formed as part the Klokot municipality on 8 January 2010, based on the Ahtisaari plan. The village, and municipality, is a Kosovo enclave. It has 240 inhabitants (2011 census). It is located in the geographical region of Gornja Morava, and is situated 583 m above sea level.

The village has a medieval church, dedicated to St. Nicholas. It was mined and destroyed by Albanians during the Kosovo War. There are archaeological sites located within the cadastral area. A palaeolithic cave is located below the St. Nicholas Church. Remains of a Roman-era stone building are located 2,5 km from the village, on the left side of the Grnčar–Letnica road. The locality of Gradište has remains of Roman, Byzantine and medieval fortification (2nd–14th c.).

Demographic history
Census	1948	1953	1961	1971	1981	1991	2011
Total	374	447	456	516	523	477	240

== Anthropology ==
According to the studies of A. Urošević, published in 1929, the village was inhabited by eight families in 31 houses; six Serb, one Albanian, and one Romani:

- Irinići (5 houses, slava of St. Nicholas), Serbs, natives.
- Krčmarovići (8 h., St. Nicholas), Serbs, natives.
- Brankovići (4 h., St. Nicholas), Serbs, natives.
- Niševci (6 h., St. Nicholas), Serbs, very old settlers from the Niš area, hence their surname.
- Pejići (4 h., St. Nicholas), Serbs, moved from Žegra around 1850.
- Rustemovići (2 h.), belong to the Gashi fis (clan). Settled in 1878 as muhajirs from the Leskovac area.
- Hsini (1 h.) and Asanović (1 h.), Muslim Romani, moved, as labourers and blacksmiths, between many villages of Gornja Morava.

== Sources ==
- Урошевић, A. (1929). "Горња Морава и Изморник". СЕЗб (LI).
- Kalezić, Dimitrije M. (2002). A - Z. Savremena administracija. p. 493. ISBN 9788638706716.
