= North Kosovo crisis =

The North Kosovo crisis may refer to:

- North Kosovo crisis (2011–2013)
- North Kosovo crisis (2021)
- North Kosovo crisis (2022–2026)
