= Ranilug =

Ranilug: Ranillug or Ranillugu (Albanian) Ranilug or Ранилуг (Serbian)
- Village and municipality
- Emblem
- Interactive map of Ranilug
- Location within Kosovo
- Coordinates: 42°29′31.194″N 21°33′32.4″E
- Country: Kosovo
- District: District of Gjilan
- Settlements: 12
- Municipality: 5 January 2010

Government
  - Mayor: Tanja Antic (SL)

Area
  - Total: 77.62 km^{2} (29.97 sq mi)
- Elevation: 603 m (1,978 ft)

Population (2015)
  - Total: 5,800
  - Density: 75/km^{2} (190/sq mi)
- est.
- Time zone: UTC+1 (CET)
  - Summer (DST): UTC+2 (CEST)
- Postal code: 38267
- Area code: +383(0)280
- Vehicle registration: 06
- Website: kk.rks-gov.net/ranillug

Ranilug (Serbian Cyrillic: Ранилуг) or Ranillug (Albanian definite form: Ranillugu), is a village and municipality located in the Gjilan District of Kosovo. The municipality comprises 12 villages and as of 2015 has a population of 5,800 inhabitants.

== History ==
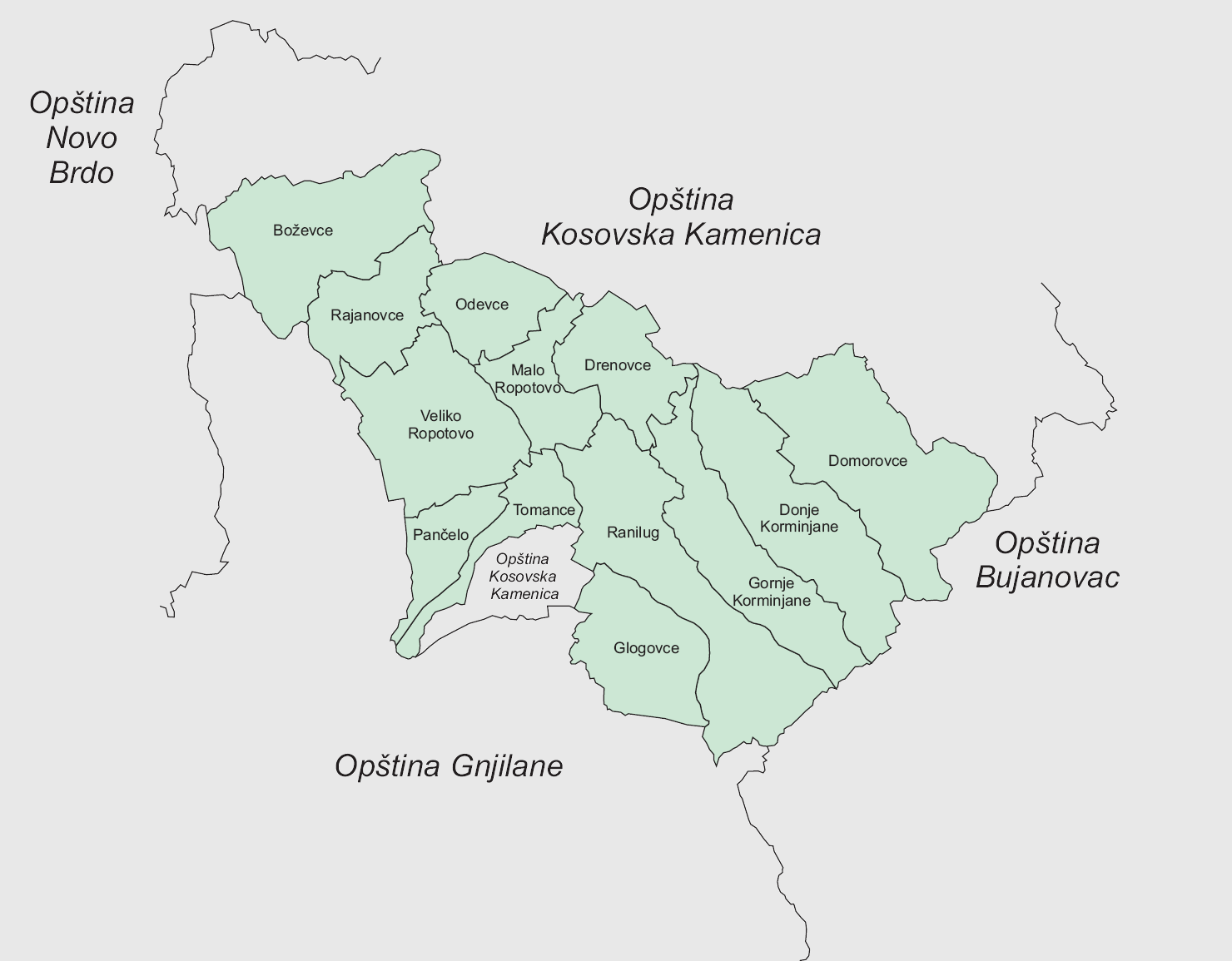
Administrative division of Ranilug

On 6 September 1999 an incident occurred in Ranilug, when three Serbian gunmen attacked a car vehicle with Albanian civilians on the outskirts of the town. The gunmen were quickly halted by a Russian KFOR convoy. In the ensuing standoff all three Serbian gunmen were killed, while the Russian KFOR suffered no deaths or injuries.

Until 2010, Ranilug was part of Kamenica municipality. On 5 January 2010, the constitutive municipal assembly session was held and Ranilug became newly established municipality. Although the new municipality is primarily inhabited by Serbs, this move was not recognized by the Government of Serbia, which does not recognize the Republic of Kosovo, and therefore its administrative changes.

After the 2013 Brussels Agreement between the governments of Kosovo and Serbia, Serbia recognized the municipalities and the Kosovo's governance of the territory, and agreed to create a Community of Serb Municipalities, which were to operate within the Kosovo legal framework. Part of the agreement which pertained to the creation of the Association of Serbian municipalities was deemed unconstitutional by Kosovo’s Constitutional Court and since then the agreement has been blocked.

== Settlements ==
Aside from the village of Ranilug, the municipality includes the following villages:

- Bozevce
- Domorovce
- Drenovce
- Glogovce
- Odevce
- Gornje Korminjane
- Donje Korminjane
- Pančelo
- Rajanovce
- Veliko Ropotovo
- Malo Ropotovo
- Tomance

== Demographics ==
According to the 2011 census done by the Government of Kosovo, the municipality of Ranilug has 3,900 inhabitants. However, in 2015 report by OSCE, the population of Ranilug municipality stands at 5,800 inhabitants, including internally displaced persons.

=== Ethnic groups ===
The municipality of Ranilug is largely composed of Kosovo Serbs majority (98.5%), with minority Kosovo Albanians (1.4%). Albanians reside in two villages: Veliko Ropotovo (Ropotovë e Madhe) and Donje Korminjane (Korminjani).

The ethnic composition of the municipality including IDPs is as follows:

Ethnic group	2015 est.	2024 census
Serbs	5,718	2,349
Albanians	82	129
Others	-	3
Total	5,800	2,481

== Economy ==
The economy of Ranilug is mainly based on small businesses, dairy production and agriculture.

== Public services and infrastructure ==
One municipal health center as well as eight health houses operate in the municipality. In 2011 a new police station was inaugurated, with 22 police officers.

The education system of the municipality consists of one kindergarten, two primary and two secondary schools.

== See also ==
- Municipalities of Kosovo
- Community of Serb Municipalities
