= Serb List (Kosovo) =

Kosovar political party

Serb List Српска листа Srpska lista Lista Serbe
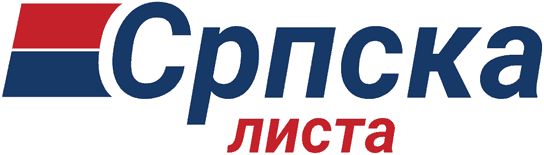
- Abbreviation: SL
- President: Zlatan Elek
- Parliamentary leader: Igor Simić
- Vice Presidents: Dragiša Milović; Ivan Zaporožac; Tanja Vujović; Dragana Antonijević; Dalibor Jevtić
- Founder: Aleksandar Jablanović
- Founded: 2014; 12 years ago
- Headquarters: North Mitrovica
- Ideology: Serb minority politics Serbian nationalism Populism
- Political position: Big tent
- Serbian affiliation: Serbian Progressive Party
- Colours: Red; Blue; White
- Slogan: Jedna lista – Jedan narod One List – One People
- Assembly: 9 / 120
- Mayors: 10 / 38
- Municipal assemblies: 117 / 994

Website
- srpskalista.net

The Serb List (Serbian: Српска листа, romanized: Srpska lista; Albanian: Lista Serbe) is a Serb minority political party in Kosovo. It was the dominant Serb party in Kosovo politics, claiming all ten of the Assembly seats reserved for the community, from 2014 until all its members resigned and withdrew in 2022. The party retained close links to the previous Government of Serbia, led by the Serbian Progressive Party and President Aleksandar Vučić.

== History ==
Logo of the initial organization, called the Citizen Initiative Srpska (2013)

On 19 April 2013, the Brussels Agreement was signed, and by the autumn of the same year the initial political association was formed, originally called the Citizen Initiative Serbia (Serbian: Грађанска иницијатива Србија, romanized: Građanska inicijativa Srbija), but that initial name had to be changed into: Citizen Initiative Srpska (Serbian: Грађанска иницијатива Српска, romanized: Građanska inicijativa Srpska), upon formal request of the Central Election Commission of Kosovo in order to be officially registered for the 2013 local elections in Kosovo, that were held on 3 November 2013. It had candidates in various municipalities, mainly those inhabited by Serbs, and won the majority of Serbian votes.

The combined number of votes for the Serb List was 38,169 (5.30%) at the 2014 Kosovan parliamentary election. On 17 September 2014, the Serb List announced that they would join the government cabinet only if Vetëvendosje was not part of it. Aleksandar Jablanović, the Minister for Returns and Communities in the Government of Kosovo, was dismissed on 3 February 2015, after the opposition demanded his dismissal after he called the group of ethnic Albanians who attacked Serb IDPs in Gjakova with stones on Christmas Eve "savages". His statement contributed to the 2015 Kosovo protests. The Serb List decided not to attend the next Kosovo assembly session.

Following Jablanović's resignation from the party, a splinter party by the name of the Party of Kosovo Serbs was founded on 6 April 2017 and registered on 15 May 2017. In June 2017, attacks and conflicts between the two parties became frequent.

Following the 2017 Kosovan parliamentary election, the Serb List agreed to form the Government of Kosovo led by Ramush Haradinaj of Alliance for the Future of Kosovo, allegedly under main condition that the Community of Serb Municipalities be established.

On 24 September 2023, the party's vice-president Milan Radoičić led an attack against the Kosovo Police in Banjska, which resulted in one policeman and three militants of Radoičić's group getting killed. On 29 September, Radoičić resigned from the party after admitting that he had organized the attack. The attack has been classified as a terrorist attack by the EU. On 24 October 2023, Zlatan Elek was appointed president of the party.

On 5 December 2024, the party's nine MPs were expelled from the Assembly of the Republic of Kosovo for repeated provocations and prolonged absences from the chamber. On 23 December, the Central Election Commission of Kosovo declined to certify the party, citing its refusal to recognise Kosovo as an independent state and its ties to the Serbian government. This prevents the Serb List from standing in the 2025 Kosovan parliamentary election. The party said it would appeal the decision, calling it “institutional and political violence” against the Serb minority. On 25 December 2024, the Election Complaints and Appeals Panel (ECAP) accepted the Serb List's appeal against the Central Election Commission of Kosovo decision to deny their certification for participation in the upcoming parliamentary elections in Kosovo. ECAP instructed the Central Election Commission to certify the Serb List for the election.

== Election results ==
=== Parliamentary elections ===
Assembly of Kosovo
Year	Popular vote	%Votes	Overall seats won	Serb seats	Position	+/–	Government
2014	38,199	5.20%	9 / 120	9 / 10	▲5th	▲9	Coalition
2017	44,578	6.20%	9 / 120	9 / 10	▲4th	0	Coalition
2019	52,620	6.61%	10 / 120	10 / 10	▼5th	▲1	Coalition
2021	44,407	5.06%	10 / 120	10 / 10	5th	0	Coalition (2021–2022) (Note: At the moment when the government was voted, even though they were part of it, they voted against it.)
2021	44,407	5.06%	10 / 120	10 / 10	5th	0	Opposition (2022–2025) (Note: Ten days after resignation they decided to return to the Assembly with other nine new MPs and one from GI SPO, who then joins Serb List.)
Feb 2025	39,915	4.62%	9 / 120	9 / 10	5th	▼1	Snap election
Dec 2025	42,759	4.49%	9 / 120	9 / 10	5th	0	Opposition
2026	43,843	5.40%	9 / 120	9 / 10	5th	0	TBA

=== Municipal parliaments ===
Serb List formed local government in all 10 Serb majority municipalities in Kosovo after the 2017 Kosovan local elections.

Municipality	Map Location	Population (2011)	Status	Mayor
Leposavić; Leposaviq		13,733	Left the assembly	Zoran Todić (resigned)
North Mitrovica; Severna Kosovska Mitrovica		12,326	Left the assembly	Aleksandar Spirić (resigned)
Gračanica; Graçanica		10,675	Majority	Srđan Popović
Zvečan; Zveçan		7,481	Left the assembly	Vučina Janković (resigned)
Štrpce; Shtërpca		6,949	Majority	Bratislav Nikolić
Novo Brdo; Novobërda		6,729	Majority	Saša Milošević
Zubin Potok; Zubin Potoku		6,616	Left the assembly	Stevan Vulović (resigned)
Ranilug; Ranillug		3,866	Majority	Vladica Aritonović
Klokot; Kllokot		2,556	Majority	Božidar Dejanović
Parteš; Partesh		1,787	Majority	Dragan Petković

== List of presidents ==
President		Term start	Term end
1	Aleksandar Jablanović born 1980	2014	2015
2	Slavko Simić born 1984	2015	2017
3	Goran Rakić born 1971	2017	2023
4	Zlatan Elek born 1968	2023	incumbent

== See also ==
- Community of Serb Municipalities
- Serbian Progressive Party
- Office for Kosovo and Metohija
