= Radovan Ničić =

Serbian politician (born 1971)

Radovan Ničić (Serbian Cyrillic: Радован Ничић; born 1971) was the first President of the Assembly of the Community and Municipalities of the Autonomous Province of Kosovo and Metohija since 28 June 2008.

== Career ==
He was the de jure Mayor of Pristina (seat in Gračanica), elected during the 2008 Serbian local elections in Kosovo.
