= North Mitrovica =

North Mitrovica: Mitrovicë Veriore or Mitrovica e Veriut (Albanian) Severna Mitrovica or Северна Митровица (Serbian)
- Town and municipality
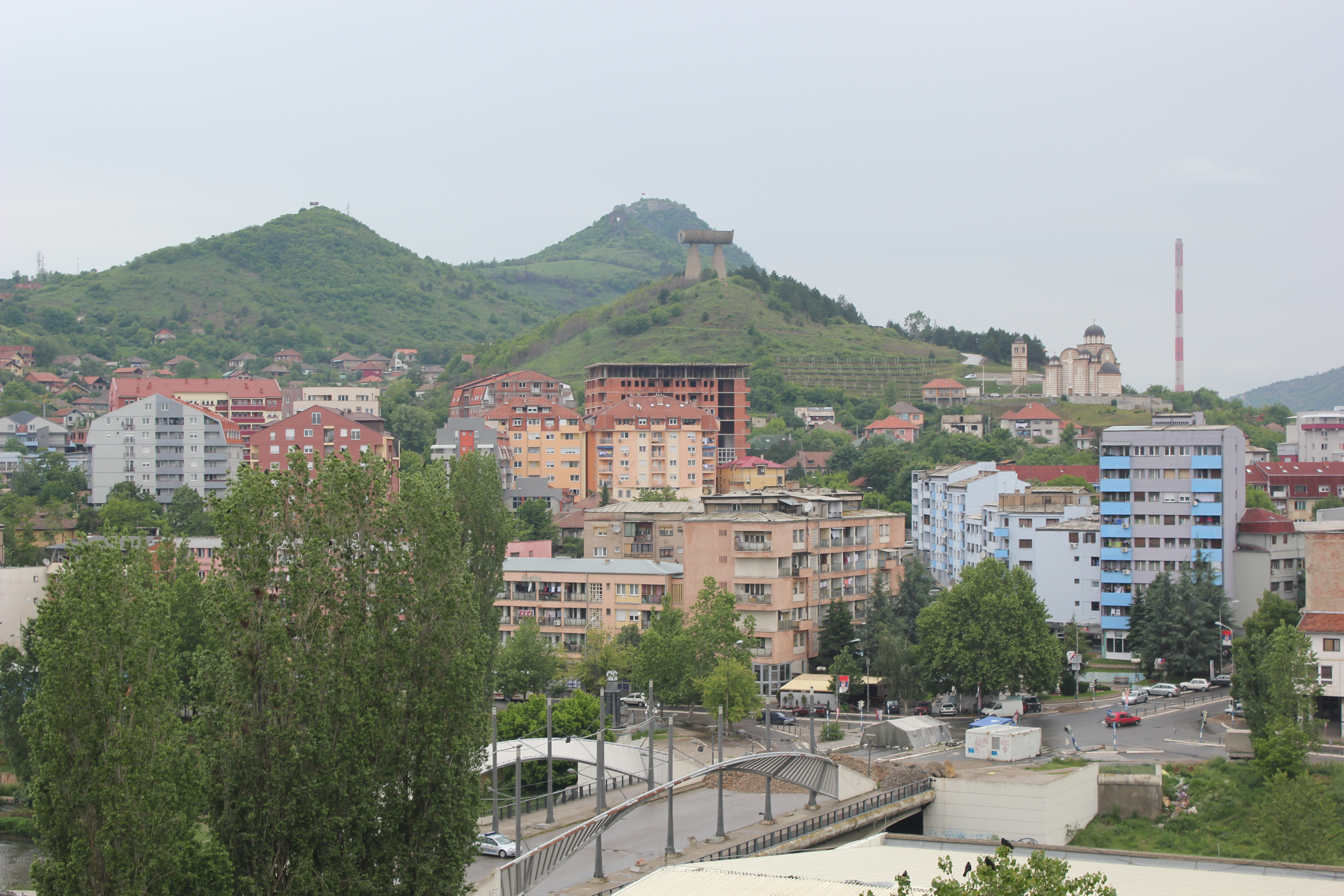
- View of North Mitrovica; Zvečan Fortress on the mountain to the left, Trepča chimney on the right, and Ibar Bridge in the center.

- Emblem

- Location of the municipality of North Mitrovica within Kosovo
- Interactive map of North Mitrovica
- Coordinates: 42°53′41″N 20°51′56″E
- Country: Kosovo
- District: Mitrovica
- Established: 2013

Government
  - Mayor: Milan Radojevic (SL)

Area
  - Total: 11 km^{2} (4.2 sq mi)
- Elevation: 515 m (1,690 ft)

Population
  - Estimate (2023): 27,730
  - Density: 2,678/km^{2} (6,940/sq mi)
- Time zone: UTC+1 (CET)
  - Summer (DST): UTC+2 (CEST)
- Postal code: 40000
- Area code: +383(0)28
- Vehicle registration: 02
- Climate: Cfb
- Website: Official site

North Mitrovica (Note: Serbian: Северна Митровица / Severna Mitrovica; Albanian: Mitrovicë Veriore, definite form: Mitrovica e Veriut) is a town and municipality located in district of Mitrovica in Kosovo. As of 2015, it has a population of 29,460 inhabitants. It covers an area of 11 km^{2} (4 sq mi).

North Mitrovica is a part of North Kosovo, a region with an ethnic Serb majority. The municipality was established in 2013 after North Kosovo crisis, previously being the settlement of the city of Mitrovica, divided by the Ibar river.

Following the 2013 Brussels Agreement, the municipality is planned to be the administrative center of the Community of Serb Municipalities.

== Name ==
The northern part of Mitrovica has also been referred to as "North(ern) Kosovska Mitrovica" (Serbian: Северна Косовска Митровица/Severna Kosovska Mitrovica). During the rule of Josip Broz Tito, Titova was added to the name of the city of Mitrovica and in the early 1990s it was replaced with Kosovska to distinguish it from the town of Sremska Mitrovica. In more recent usage, the northern part is increasingly referred to simply as North Mitrovica (Albanian: Mitrovica e Veriut; Serbian: Северна Митровица/Severna Mitrovica).

== History ==
The city was part of Mitrovica, until its official separation in 2013. The separation came as a result of the North Kosovo crisis, following Kosovo's declaration of independence from Serbia in February 2008. The municipality was recognized by the Government of Kosovo in 2013 before the Kosovo local elections.

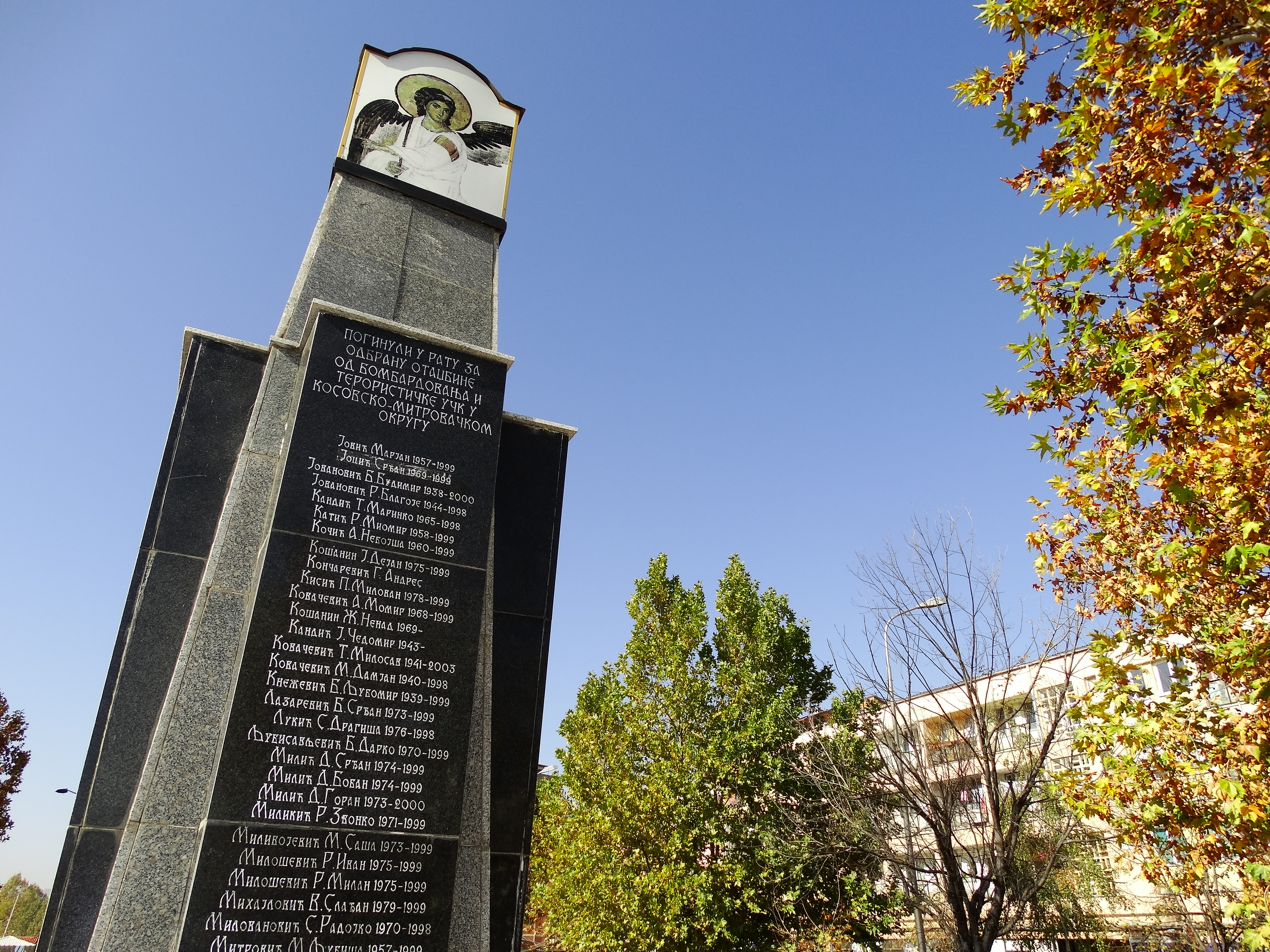
Monument to Serbian victims of Kosovo War

The city served as the de facto capital of the North Kosovo region which refused to work with the institutions of the Republic of Kosovo. Therefore, local Serbs formed the Assembly of Community of Municipalities, supported only by Serbia.

However, with the signing of the 2013 Brussels Agreement after the North Kosovo crisis, between the governments of Kosovo and Serbia, Serbia officially dropped its support for the assembly, agreeing to create a new Community of Serb Municipalities, an association of municipalities with Serb majority in Kosovo. Its assembly will have no legislative authority and the judicial authorities will be integrated and operate within the Kosovo legal framework.

== Administration ==
The Municipal Assembly of North Mitrovica has 19 deputies, one of whom is the speaker. There are currently 15 active councilors.

Party	Seats	Gov't?
Civic Initiative "Mitrovica"	14	Yes
Independent	1	Yes

== Demographics ==
Historical population
Year	Pop.	±% p.a.
2008	22,000	—
2015	29,460	+4.26%

According to the 2011 estimations by the Government of Kosovo, North Mitrovica has 3,393 households and 12,326 inhabitants.

In 2015, according to a report by OSCE, the population of North Mitrovica Municipality stands at 29,460 inhabitants.

=== Ethnic groups ===
The majority of North Mitrovica municipality is composed of Kosovo Serbs with more than 22,530 inhabitants (76.4%). Also, 4,900 (16.6%) Kosovo Albanians and 2,000 others live in the municipality.

In North Mitrovica, according to the Update 2009, conducted by Kosovo Agency of Statistics, Serbs and other ethnic groups make up 92.97% or 11,459 inhabitants, while 7.03% or 867 were Albanians. Since North Mitrovica did not participate in population census conducted in April, 2011, the data is taken from the update 2008–2009 by Kosovo Agency of Statistics which is considered as official by Kosovo government. However, other different institutions have done other estimates that came up with different data.

Ethnic composition in North Mitrovica according to 2009 Update
Group	Population	Percentage
Albanian	867	7.03%
Serbs and others	11,459	92.97%
Total	12,326	100%

The ethnic composition of the municipality of North Mitrovica, including IDPs:

Ethnic group	2023 est.	Percentage
Serbs	17,530	61%
Albanians	7,820	27%
Bosniaks	1,200	5.2%
Gorani	580	2.6%
Romani	300	1.8%
Turks	210	1.5%
Ashkali	80	0.7%
Others	15	0.2%
Total	27,730	100%

== Culture and education ==
North Mitrovica currently represents the most important political, cultural, educational and health centres for Serbs in Kosovo. It is the largest urban area in Kosovo where Serbs form the ethnic majority. The University of Priština is located in the area, having relocated from Pristina to Mitrovica during the Kosovo War. In 2013, after November elections in Kosovo, North Mitrovica officially became a separate municipality.

== Sport ==
The FK Trepča Sever and Rudar Kosovska Mitrovica are football clubs that are located in this part of the city. Currently FK Trepca plays in Serbian fourth-tier Morava Zone League while FK Rudar Kosovska Mitrovica plays in the fifth-tier Football First League of North Kosovo.

== Twin towns – sister cities ==
- (United States) Wylie, Texas, USA

== Gallery ==
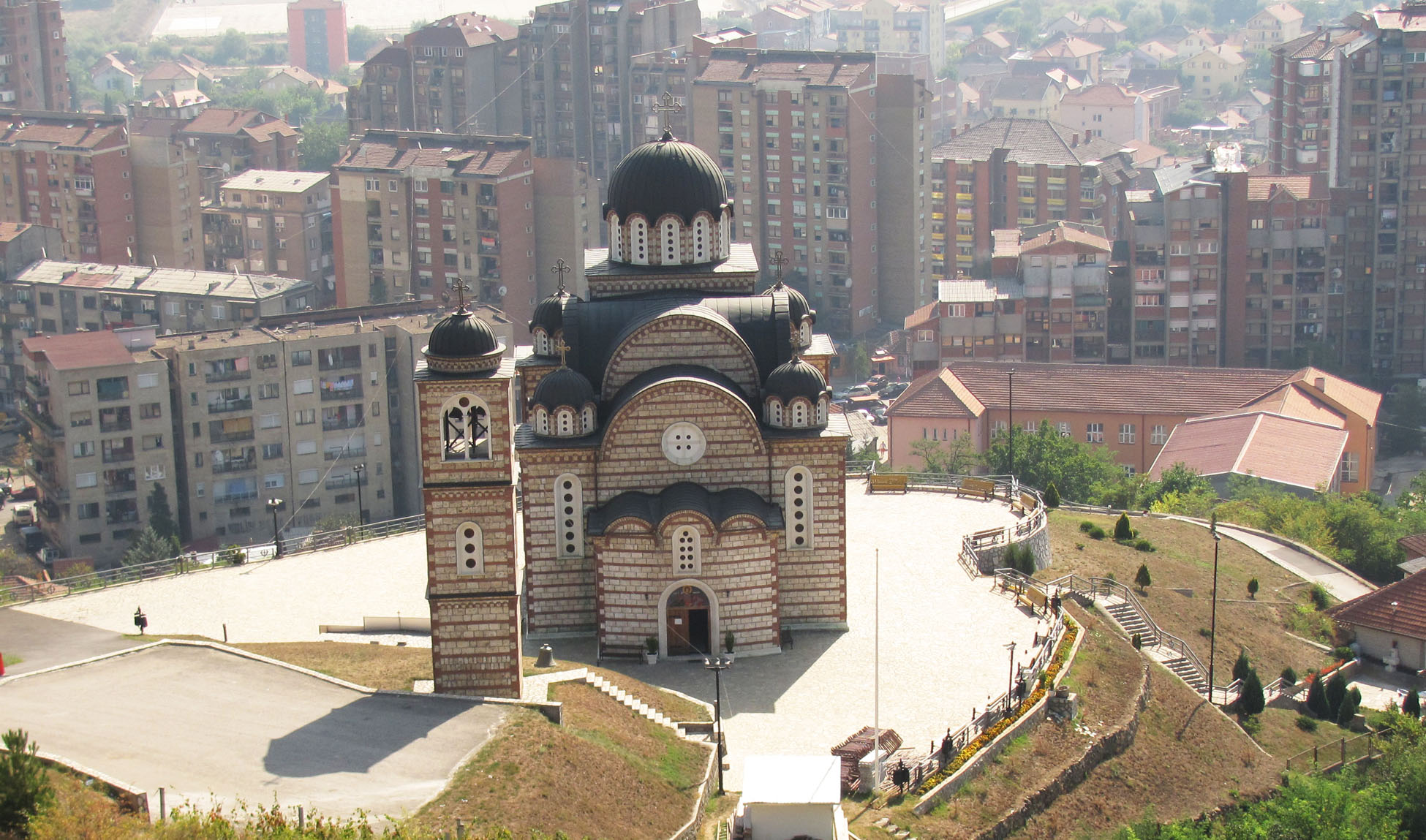
Serbian Orthodox church in North Mitrovica

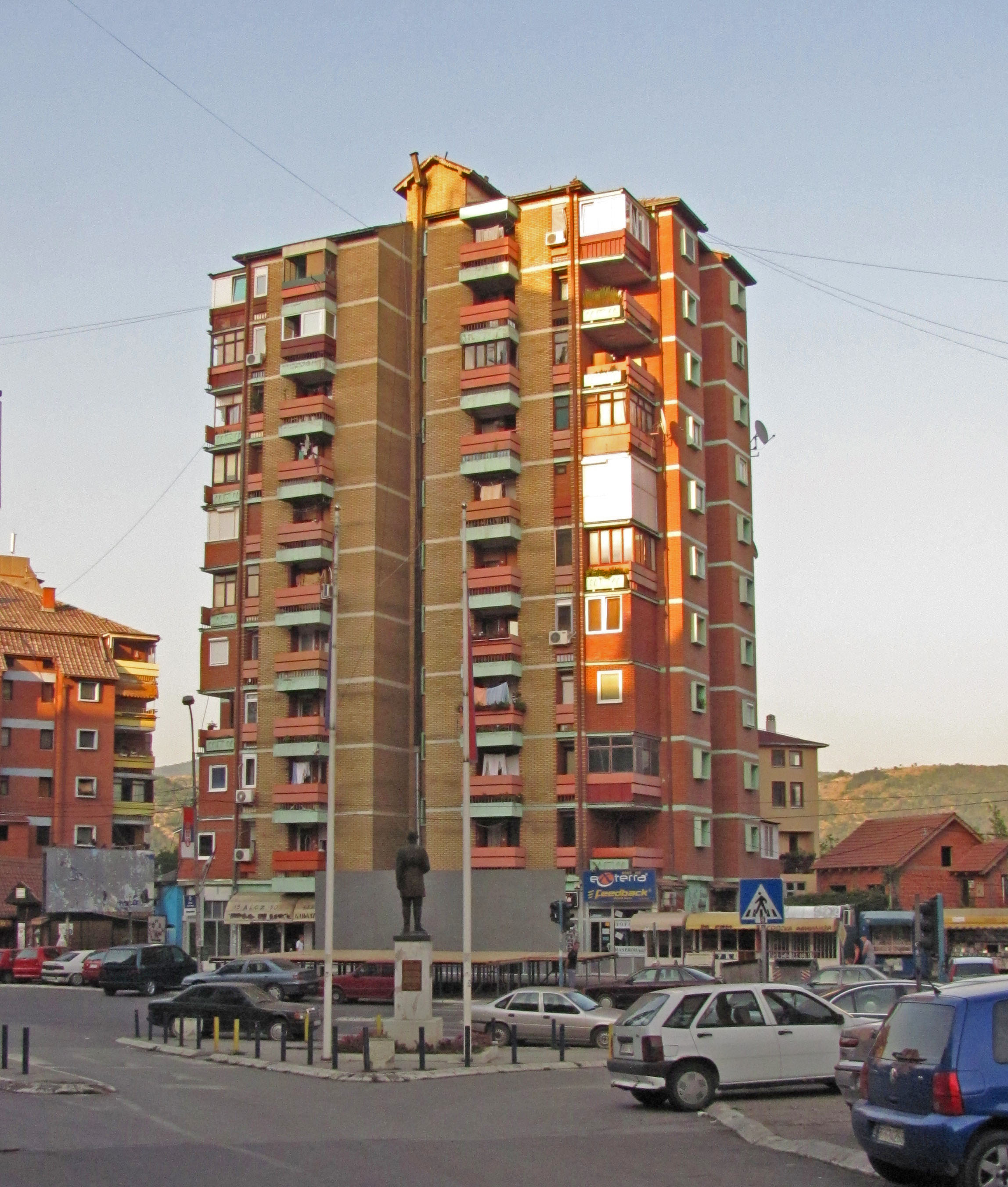
Residential building in North Mitrovica

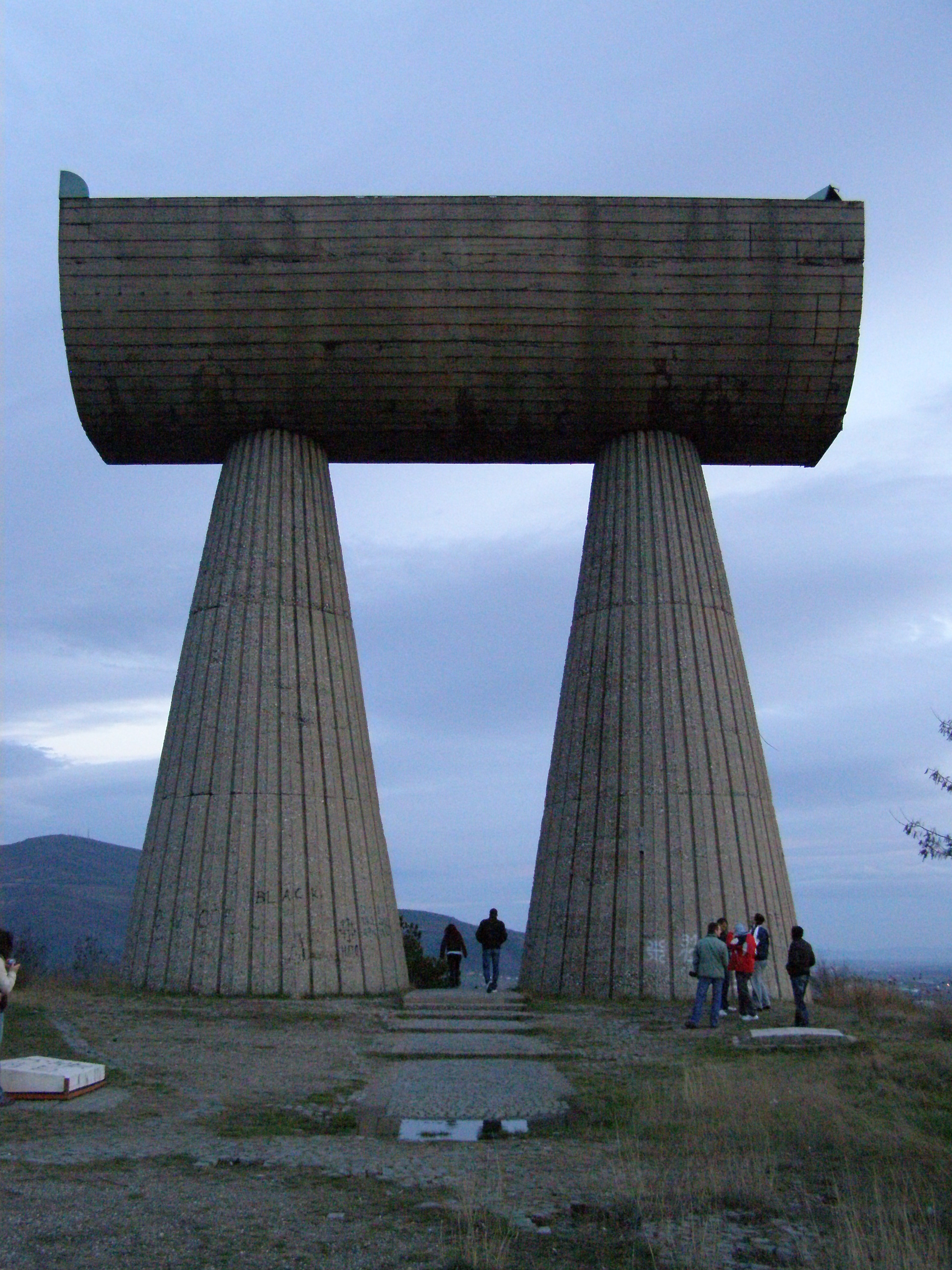
Communist-era monument in North Mitrovica

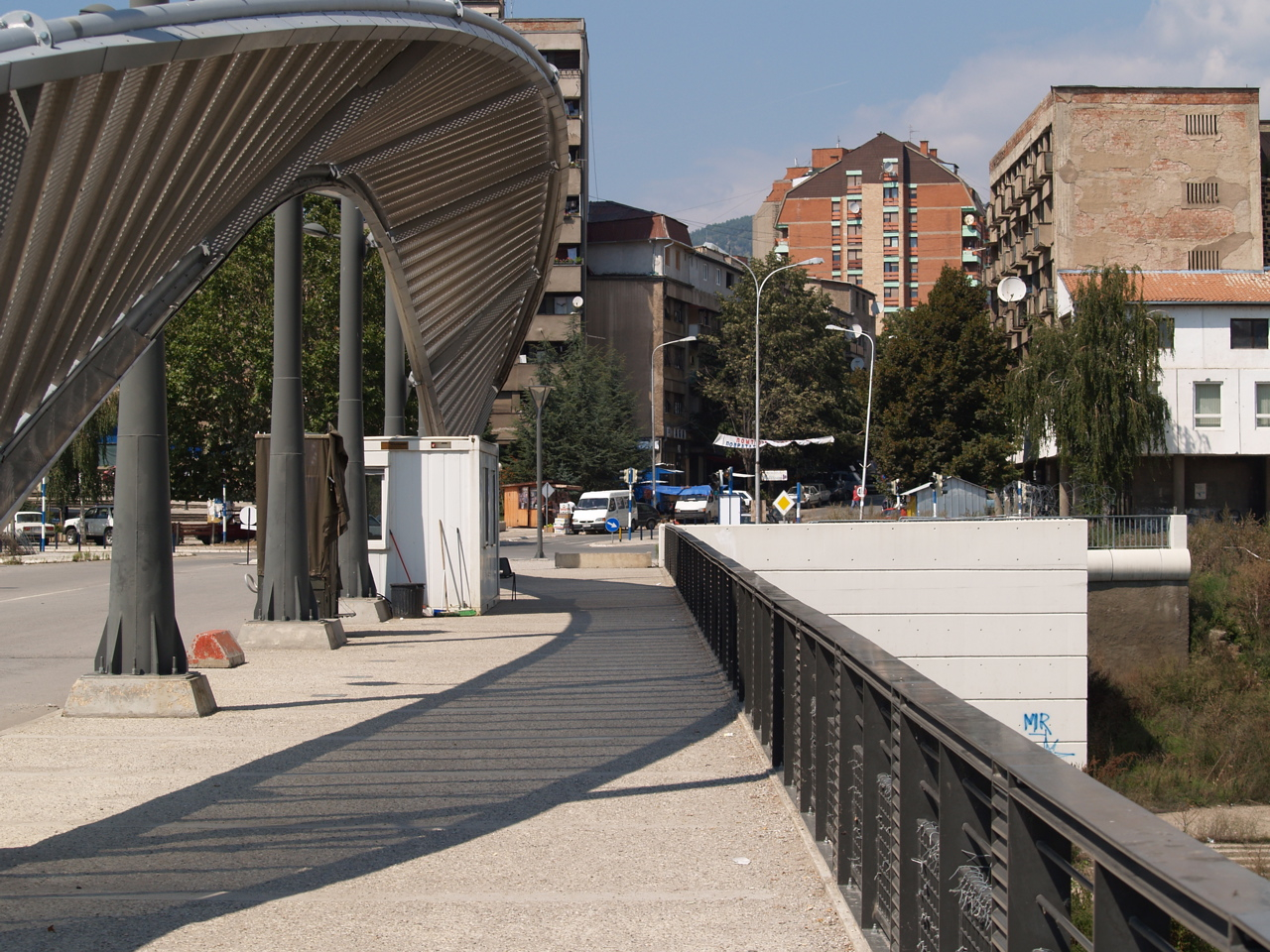
Bridge dividing South and North Mitrovica

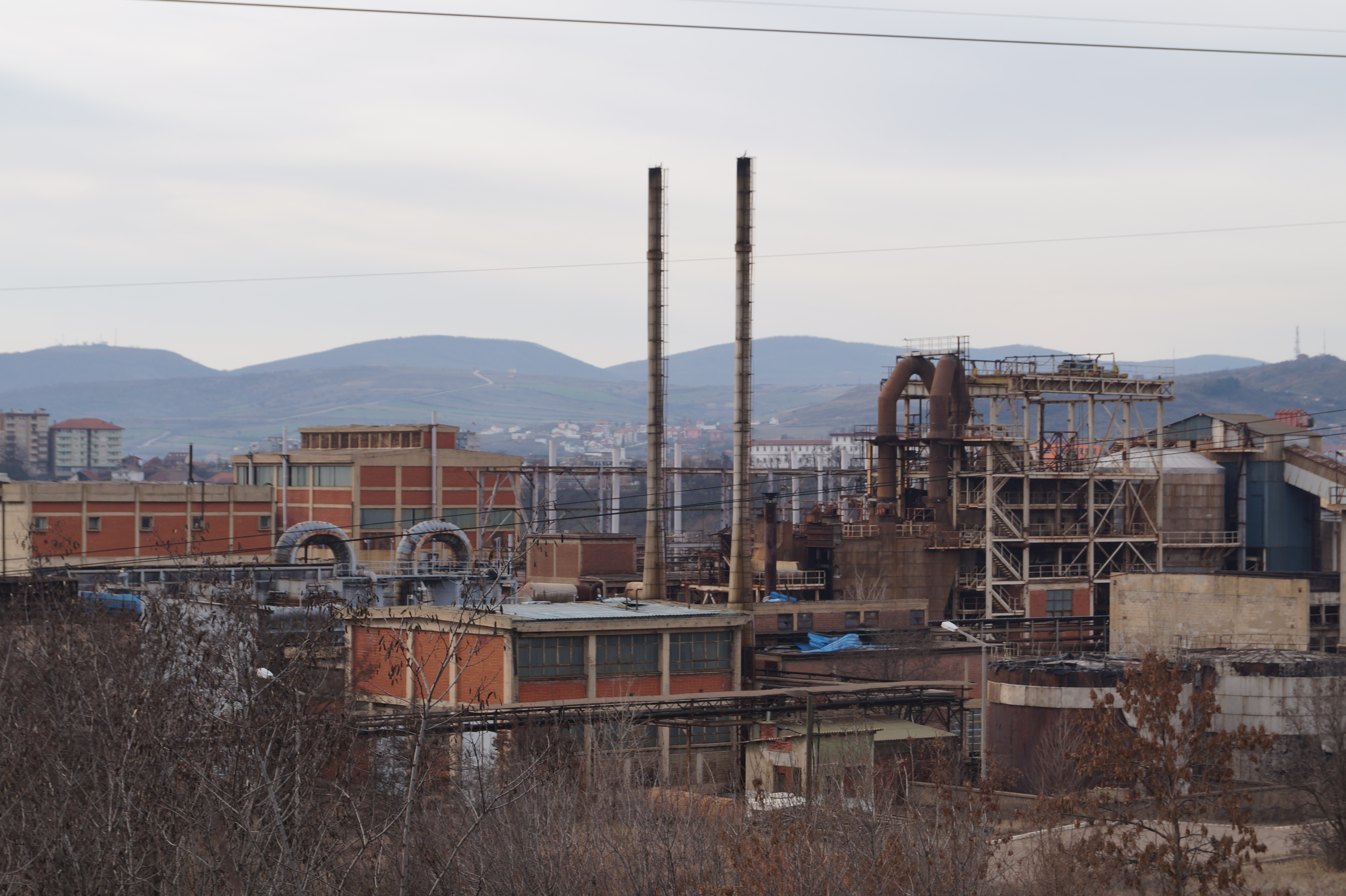
Trepča Mines factory

== See also ==
- New Bridge, Mitrovica
