= Community of Serb Municipalities =

Proposed association in Kosovo

- Serbian: Заједница српских општина / Zajednica srpskih opština Albanian: Asociacioni i Komunave Serbe
- Location of Serb-majority municipalities within Kosovo (in red)
- Legal status: Proposed inter-municipal association
- Headquarters: North Mitrovica
- Location: Kosovo
- Origins: 2013 Brussels Agreement; 2023 Ohrid Agreement
- Region served: North Kosovo; Serb enclaves
- Official language: Serbian; Albanian

The Community of Serb Municipalities (Serbian: Заједница српских општина, ЗСО, romanized: Zajednica srpskih opština, ZSO; Albanian: Asociacioni i Komunave Serbe, AKS) is a planned inter-municipal association of ethnic Serb majority municipalities in Kosovo.

The proposal for the association came as a result of the 2013 Brussels Agreement negotiated and concluded by the governments of Kosovo and Serbia. In accordance with the competences given by the European Charter of Local Self-Government and Kosovo law, the participating municipalities would be entitled to cooperate in exercising their powers collectively through the association. The association would have full overview of the areas of economic development, education, health, urban and rural planning.

The Community was expected to be officially established within Kosovo's legal framework in 2015, but its formation was postponed over conflicts about extent of powers. As part of a European Union mediated normalisation agreement accepted by the leaders of Kosovo and Serbia in March 2023, Kosovo will immediately engage in dialogue with the EU to ensure a level of self-management for its ethnic Serb community.

== History ==
=== 1999–2013 ===
After the end of the 1998–99 Kosovo War, the United Nations mission United Nations Interim Administration Mission in Kosovo established under the UN Security Council Resolution 1244, took formal control over the Serbian Autonomous Province of Kosovo and Metohija. In the province, there were 194,190 Kosovo Serbs (9.9% of its total population), according to the latest Yugoslav census in 1991. During and after the war, many of them became refugees and internally displaced persons; estimates say that around one third of them emigrated to the region of Central Serbia.

In January 2003, an Assembly of the Community of Municipalities of the Autonomous Province of Kosovo and Metohija was founded with the headquarters in North Mitrovica, as an association of Serb majority municipalities in Kosovo. It was considered illegitimate by the Government of Kosovo, as it exercised legislative and executive authority through Assembly over the territory of Kosovo (mostly in North Kosovo).

In 2005, part of the Serbia-Kosovo negotiation was the Serbian side's call for the establishment of Serb municipalities and constitutional and legal protection of Serbs. UN Special Representative (UNOSEK) Søren Jessen-Petersen and Kosovo speaker Daci reiterated the ruling out of partition.

On 17 February 2008, the Assembly of Kosovo unilaterally declared independence from Serbia. Serbia continues to claim it as part of its own sovereign territory; also, the association continued to exist.

=== 2013–2015: Brussels Agreement ===
Proposed logo

In accordance with the 2013 Brussels Agreement, a Community of Serb Municipalities with the headquarters in North Mitrovica was planned to be established. Unlike the former Association, it holds no legislative authority, having only a "full overview power in the areas of economic development, education, health, urban and rural planning" in accordance with the European Charter of Local Self-Government and Kosovo law.

Its formation was predicted by the Brussels Agreement signed between Serbia and Kosovo. This agreement represents an important step in process of accession of Serbia to the European Union. By this agreement, it was also agreed that Serbia will not block accession of Kosovo to the European Union and vice versa. This agreement was also praised by UN Secretary-General Ban Ki-moon who said that it guarantees broad powers to municipalities with Serb majority in Kosovo. The Community would include these municipalities: North Kosovska Mitrovica, Zubin Potok, Leposavić, Zvečan, Štrpce, Klokot-Vrbovac, Gračanica, Novo Brdo, Ranilug and Parteš.

In one interview for Radio Television of Kosovo, Prime Minister of Kosovo Hashim Thaçi said that the establishment of an Association of Serb municipalities is in essence acceptable under the Constitution of Kosovo and Ahtisaari Plan, while the AAK party leader Ramush Haradinaj supported this by saying that the Constitution of Kosovo allows the association of municipalities, but without holding legislative, judicial or executive power. In November 2014, Ljubomir Marić, one of the coordinators with the duty of establishing the Community of Serb Municipalities stated that it would be based on the South Tyrol model in Italy and that he expected to establish two more Serb municipalities in Gora and Prilužje.

The Gorani people have stated that they want Gora (a former municipality with Gorani majority that was merged with the Albanian-inhabited Opolje to form the Dragash municipality which has an Albanian majority) to join the Community of Serb municipalities. On 3 November 2013, 70% of Gorani voted in favor of establishing the Gora municipality as part of the Community of Serb municipalities, according to Gorani political leader Safet Kuši.

The formation was expected in 2015, but later postponed.

=== 2015–2023: Stalemate ===
On 9 November 2015, Kosovo's proposal to become a UNESCO member state has failed, due to shortage of required 2/3 of votes in favor at the UNESCO General Conference. Day later, on 10 November 2015, the Government of Kosovo froze previously signed Agreement to establish Community of Serb Municipalities; the decision was condemned by the Minister of Foreign Affairs of Serbia Ivica Dačić who called it a "threat to regional stability" and a "major blow to the Brussels dialogue". In December 2015, the Constitutional Court of Kosovo proclaimed parts of 2013 Agreement unconstitutional. Since then, the realization of the Agreement was put on hold and Kosovo fell into the political crisis with constant clashes between Kosovo Albanian parties in the government and opposition, with former backing up the Agreement and latter criticizing it, saying that Kosovo Serbs would be "privileged" if the Agreement was implemented, In September 2017, following the 2017 Kosovan parliamentary election, the Serb List political party agreed to form the Government of Kosovo led by Ramush Haradinaj of Alliance for the Future of Kosovo, under main condition that the Community of Serb Municipalities be established.

=== 2023–present: Ohrid Agreement and implementation ===
The leaders of Kosovo and Serbia accepted a European Union proposed normalisation agreement on 27 February 2023 and agreed a roadmap for its implementation on 18 March 2023. Under the terms of the agreement Kosovo will immediately launch dialogue with the European Union to ensure an "appropriate level of self-management" for its ethnic Serb community. The government of Kosovo is studying 15 European models for local-self governance and minority protection in order to develop an appropriate system to use.

A draft statute for the formation of an Association of Serb-majority Municipalities in Kosovo was presented by EU leaders on 26 October 2023, and the leaders of Kosovo and Serbia expressed their readiness to implement their commitments.

On 15 May 2024, Kosovo's foreign minister Donika Gërvalla-Schwarz stated in a letter to the president of the Parliamentary Assembly of the Council of Europe, Theodoros Roussopoulos, that Kosovo will prepare draft legislation for the establishment of a community of Serb-majority municipalities, and will submit it to the Constitutional Court of Kosovo, for an opinion regarding its constitutionality, by the end of May 2024. The draft legislation is inspired by a proposal drawn up by the Friedrich Ebert Foundation, a German think tank in January 2023.

As of June 2026 all work on the Community has been stalled by the government of Albin Kurti until Serbia recognizes Kosovo independence.

== Municipalities ==
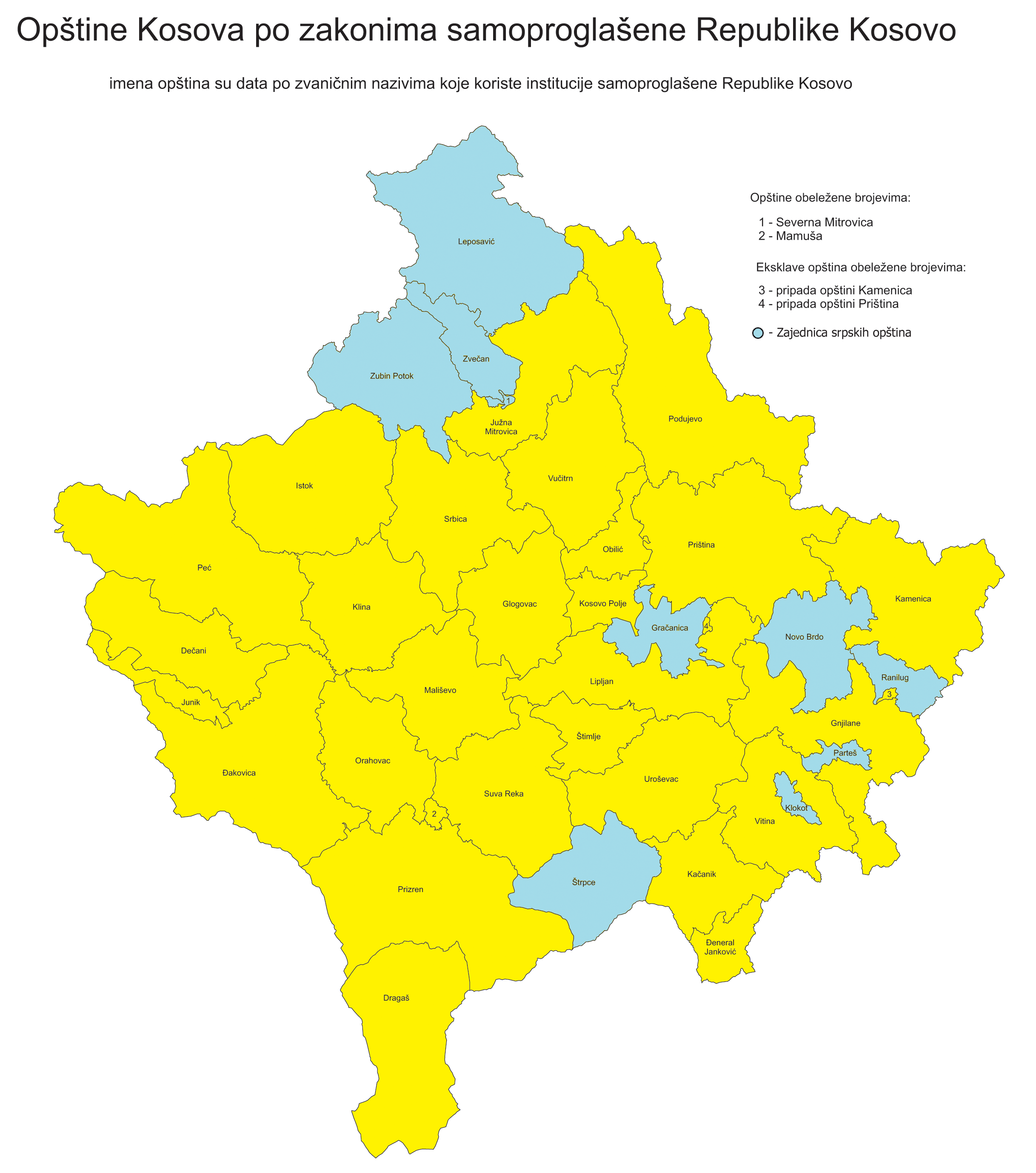
Community of Serb Municipalities

The association would include these municipalities: North Mitrovica, Zubin Potok, Leposavić, Zvečan, Štrpce, Klokot, Gračanica, Novo Brdo, Ranilug and Parteš. Total area of these municipalities stands at 1,708 km^{2} (659 sq mi) (15.66% of Kosovo's total area).

The following table shows the area and population figures of these municipalities:

Municipality	District	Area	Area in km^{2}	Population
North Mitrovica	Mitrovica	North Kosovo	11	29,460
Leposavić	Mitrovica	North Kosovo	539	18,600
Zvečan	Mitrovica	North Kosovo	122	16,650
Zubin Potok	Mitrovica	North Kosovo	335	15,200
Štrpce	Ferizaj	Enclaves	247	13,630
Gračanica	Pristina	Enclaves	131	10,675
Novo Brdo	Pristina	Enclaves	204	9,670
Ranilug	Gjilan	Enclaves	78	5,800
Klokot	Gjilan	Enclaves	23	2,556
Parteš	Gjilan	Enclaves	18	1,738
Total			1,708	123,979

== Demographics ==
The Community's population estimates range between 70,000 and 125,000 inhabitants. The correct number of the population is unknown, due to the boycott of 2011 Kosovo census in North Kosovo and partial boycott in southern Serb enclaves.

There are seven municipalities in Kosovo with an ethnic Serb majority. The Albanian population in these municipalities ranged up to 25%, with relative majority in Novo Brdo, Štrpce and Klokot. Other ethnic groups include Bosniaks, Gorani, Romani and others.

ECMI "calls for caution when referring to the 2011 census", due to the boycott by Serb-majority municipalities in North Kosovo and the partial boycott by Serb and Roma in southern Kosovo.

The following table shows ethnic composition of these municipalities based on the estimates:

Municipalities	Serbs		Albanians		Other		Total	Reference
Municipalities	Number	%	Number	%	Number	%	Total	Reference
Gračanica	7,209	67.7	2,474	23.2	973	9.1	10,656	2011 Census
Klokot	1,362	43.2	1,775	56.3	17	0.5	3,154	2011 Census
Leposavić	18,000	96.3	300	1.6	400	2.1	18,700	Estimate (OSCE)
Novo Brdo	3,112	46.4	3,524	52.4	83	1.2	6,729	2011 Census
North Mitrovica	22,530	76.6	4,900	16.6	2,000	6.8	29,430	Estimate (OSCE)
Parteš	1,785	99.9	0	0	2	0.1	1,787	2011 Census
Ranilug	3,692	95.5	164	4.2	10	0.3	3,886	2011 Census
Štrpce	3,148	46.5	3,575	52.8	44	0.7	6,767	2011 Census
Zubin Potok	13,900	93.3	1,000	6.7			14,900	Estimate (OSCE)
Zvečan	16,000	96.1	350	2.1	300	1.8	16,650	Estimate (OSCE)
Community of Serb municipalities	91,161	80.9	17,649	15.7	3,829	3.4	112,639	

== Criticism ==
=== Criticisms in the Albanian community ===
The Brussels Agreement between Belgrade and Pristina was criticized by representatives of Albanians in south Serbia as they claim that the Brussels agreement gives Serbs in Kosovo autonomy, and thus warrants a similar level of autonomy for the municipalities in Serbia proper which have an Albanian majority. The Albanian party Vetëvendosje! has also staged protests against the agreement, as they believe that an autonomous Serb region within Kosovo would cripple the country's sovereignty and cement ethnic partition. Some in Albanian community complained that in return for the dismantling of the parallel institutions and participation of Serbs in elections the agreement leading to the establishment of the Association opened the space for the legally sanctioned Serbia's interference in local governance and therefore undermined sovereignty. Many argued that they have already made numerous overgenerous concessions in exchange for initial international recognitions.

=== Criticisms in the Serb community ===
The Brussels agreement has been criticized by the Democratic Party of Serbia which argued that it makes no mention of Serbia or its Constitution and laws, or UN Security Council Resolution 1244, while it does mention the Kosovo Constitution and laws, and therefore demanded a referendum on it. The Serbian Orthodox Church has called the agreement "a complete withdrawal of Serbia's institutions from the territory of its southern province and setting up limited autonomy of the Serb community in the area to the north of the Ibar Bridge in Mitrovica within Hashim Thaçi's establishment". Serbs in Northern Kosovo have also rallied against the agreement, and in support of the Assembly's continued rule in the Serb-majority municipalities. They feared that it represents a Serbia's retreat from the region and will lead to decreased levels of personal incomes and lower standards in terms of quality of public services once they are transferred from the Serbian system to the Kosovo one.

== See also ==
- Serbs of Kosovo
- North Kosovo
- Serb enclaves in Kosovo
- Assembly of the Community of Municipalities (Kosovo)
- Joint Council of Municipalities (Croatia)
