= 2013 Brussels Agreement =

Agreement to normalise Serbia and Kosovo relations

Brussels Agreement
First Agreement of Principles Governing the Normalisation of Relations
- Type: Treaty
- Context: Normalisation of Kosovo–Serbia relations
- Signed: 19 April 2013
- Location: Brussels, Belgium
- Mediators: European Union
- Signatories: Hashim Thaçi (Kosovo); Ivica Dačić (Serbia)
- Parties: Kosovo; Serbia

The First Agreement of Principles Governing the Normalisation of Relations, informally known as the Brussels Agreement (Serbian: Бриселски споразум / Briselski sporazum, Albanian: Marrëveshja e Brukselit), is an agreement to normalize relations between the governments of Serbia and Kosovo. The agreement, negotiated and concluded in Brussels under the auspices of the European Union, was signed on 19 April 2013. Negotiations were led by Serbian prime minister Ivica Dačić and Kosovo prime minister Hashim Thaçi, mediated by EU High Representative Catherine Ashton. The government of Serbia does not recognise Kosovo as a sovereign state, but began normalising relations with the government of Kosovo as a result of the agreement. In Belgrade, the agreement was criticized by protestors as a convalidation of Kosovo independence.

== Background ==
Following the Kosovo War and the NATO bombing of Yugoslavia in 1999, Kosovo (as part of Serbia and the Federal Republic of Yugoslavia) was placed under United Nations administration under UNSC Resolution 1244. Kosovo unilaterally declared independence in 2008, which has been recognised by 110 countries. However, Serbia maintains that Kosovo continues to be part of its territory. European Union-mediated dialogue between Kosovo and Serbia began in March 2011. Serbia and Kosovo were urged to continue talks in Brussels, but Serbia was not obliged to recognise Kosovo during the process.

== Talks ==
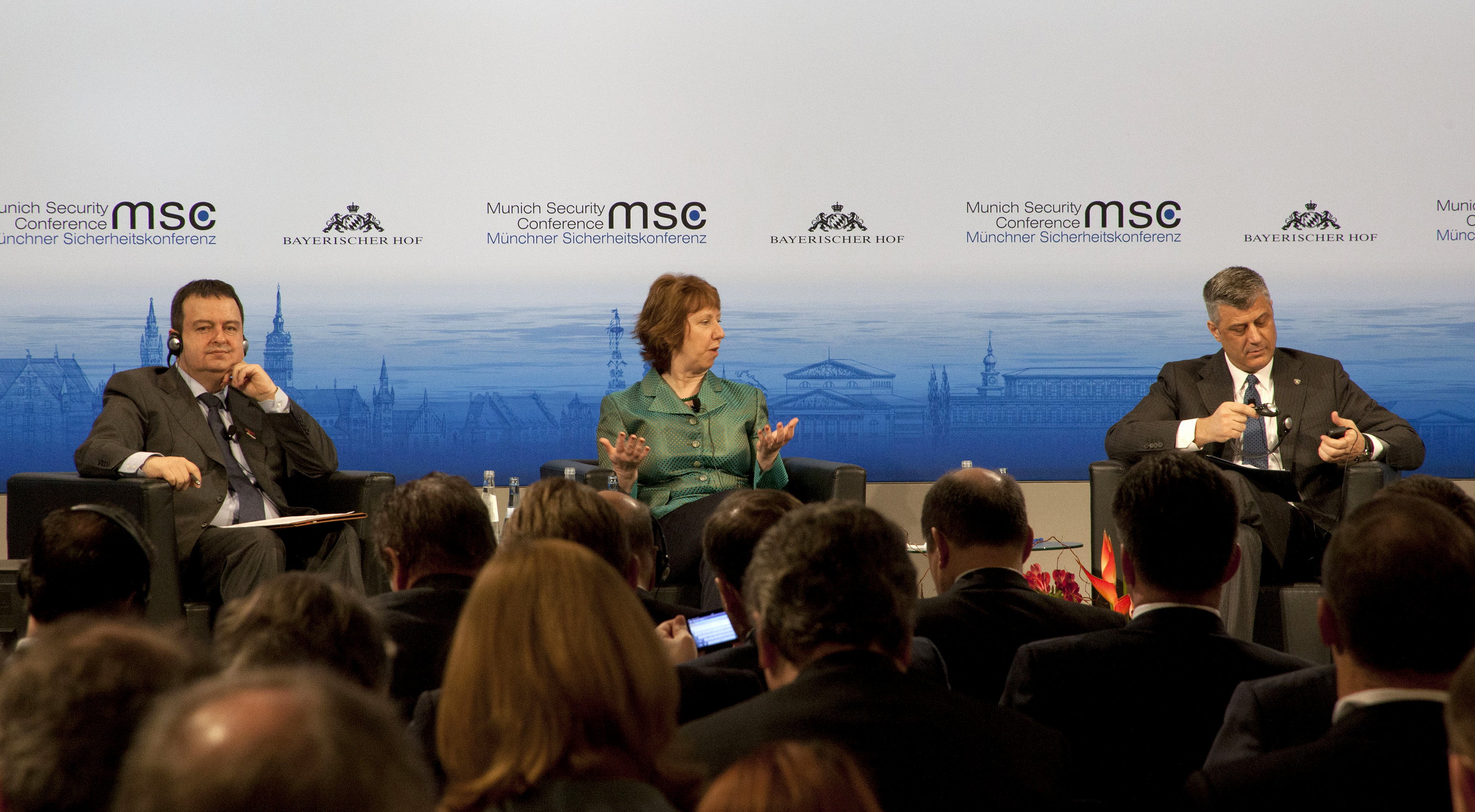
(left to right) Serbian prime minister Ivica Dačić, mediator Catherine Ashton, and Kosovar prime minister Hashim Thaçi in Munich, 2014

Ten rounds of talks were held at the European External Action Service office in Brussels. EU High Representative Catherine Ashton chaired the talks for two years, followed by Federica Mogherini. Normalisation of relations with neighbouring states is a key precondition for states wishing to join the EU; the Brussels Agreement brought Serbia close to EU accession talks and Kosovo to initializing a Stabilisation and Association Agreement (SAA). The SAA was signed by HR Mogherini and Kosovar prime minister Isa Mustafa in October 2015.

United States diplomats have supported the EU-led dialogue. U.S. secretary of state Hillary Clinton invited Baroness Ashton to travel in the Balkans, and they made joint visits to Belgrade, Pristina, and Sarajevo in October 2012.

The European Commission advised beginning an SAA with Kosovo after the agreement was concluded, and accession negotiations began with Serbia. The agreement was supported by the European Union, NATO, the OSCE, and the United Nations.

== Agreement ==
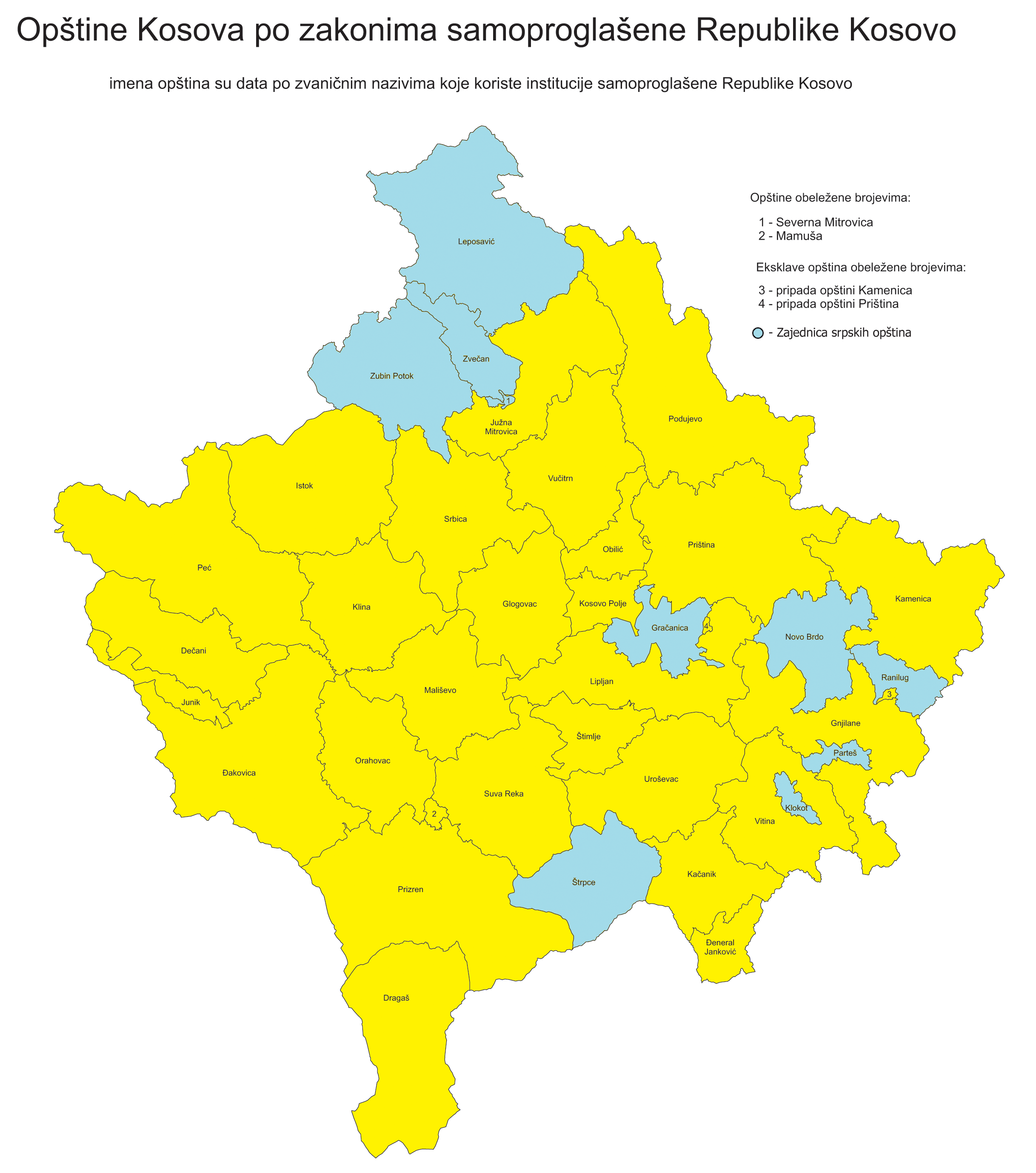
Map of Kosovo, with the planned Community of Serb Municipalities in blue

The two-page agreement has 15 paragraphs. Paragraphs 1–6 concern the establishment, scope, and functions of the planned Community of Serb Municipalities. Paragraphs 7–9 concern police and security, specifying one police force for all of Kosovo (including the north) known as the Kosovo Police. Paragraph 11 stipulates that municipal elections shall be held throughout Kosovo under Kosovo law. Paragraph 12 provides for the creation of an implementation plan and specifies a date (now past) by which the plan would be concluded. Paragraph 13 undertakes to intensify discussions on energy and telecommunications. According to Paragraph 14, "Neither side will block, or encourage others to block, the other side's progress in their respective EU paths." Paragraph 15 envisages the establishment of an implementation committee with EU facilitation.

The document agrees on the integration of Serb-majority municipalities in North Kosovo into the Kosovar legal system, with two guarantees:

- All judicial matters are under the law of Kosovo, but Kosovo Serbs must be a majority of certain judicial panels; a panel (the Mitrovica District Court) must sit in North Mitrovica.
- All policing is to be done by the Kosovo Police, but the police regional commander of the Serb-majority areas must be a Kosovo Serb chosen from a list provided by Kosovo Serb municipalities.

== Later talks ==
After the agreement was signed, meetings have been held regularly to implement its provisions. A judicial agreement was reached in February 2015, followed by agreements on energy and telecommunications operators. On 25 August of that year, an agreement was concluded to establish the Association of Serbian Communities.

Concerns existed about how the 2013 local-government elections in Kosovo would be administered, with the government of Serbia objecting to any mention of "the state of Kosovo" on ballot papers; however, the Serbian government agreed that it should encourage Serbs in northern Kosovo to participate in the local elections. That October, arrangements were made for Serbian officials to visit North Kosovo. It was agreed that electoral bodies in Kosovo would include Kosovo Serb representatives, and the international dialing code +383 would be assigned to Kosovo. After some delay, the new geographic phone code was implemented in December 2016.

== Serbian reaction ==
Scholars Smilja Avramov and Elena Guskova maintain that the agreement violates the Constitution of Serbia and the United Nations Charter, and is an indirect recognition of Kosovar independence. The Assembly of Kosovo has ratified the agreement, incorporated it into law, and treats it as an "international agreement."

The National Assembly of Serbia has not treated the agreement as international and has not ratified it, the Serbian procedure for approving an international agreement; however, it has accepted the government report about the "hitherto process of political and technical dialogue with the temporary institutions in Pristina with the mediation of EU, including the process of implementation of the achieved agreements." The constitutional court in Belgrade did not answer a question about the constitutionality of the agreement, saying in December 2014 that the issue was a political question and not a legal one.

Serbian president Aleksandar Vučić said in 2018 that the agreement is a difficult compromise for Serbia, which Vučić said had met all of its obligations.

On 24 March 2022, Serbian president Aleksandar Vučić claimed that the Brussels Agreement "no longer exists", citing the suspension of court president of Mitrovica Ljiljana Stevanović by the Kosovo Judicial Council and alleged plans to remove all Serb commanders from the Kosovo police force as the primary reason. Prime Minister Ana Brnabić made similar remarks and claimed that basic human rights of the Serb community in Kosovo were not respected.

== See also ==
- Accession of Kosovo to the European Union
- Accession of Serbia to the European Union
- Belgrade–Pristina Dialogue
- International recognition of Kosovo
- Kosovo and Serbia economic normalisation agreements
- Kosovo–Serbia relations
- Ohrid Agreement (2023)
