= Liaison Office of the Government of the Republic of Serbia at the European Union Mission in Pristina =

Representative office of the Government of Serbia to Kosovo

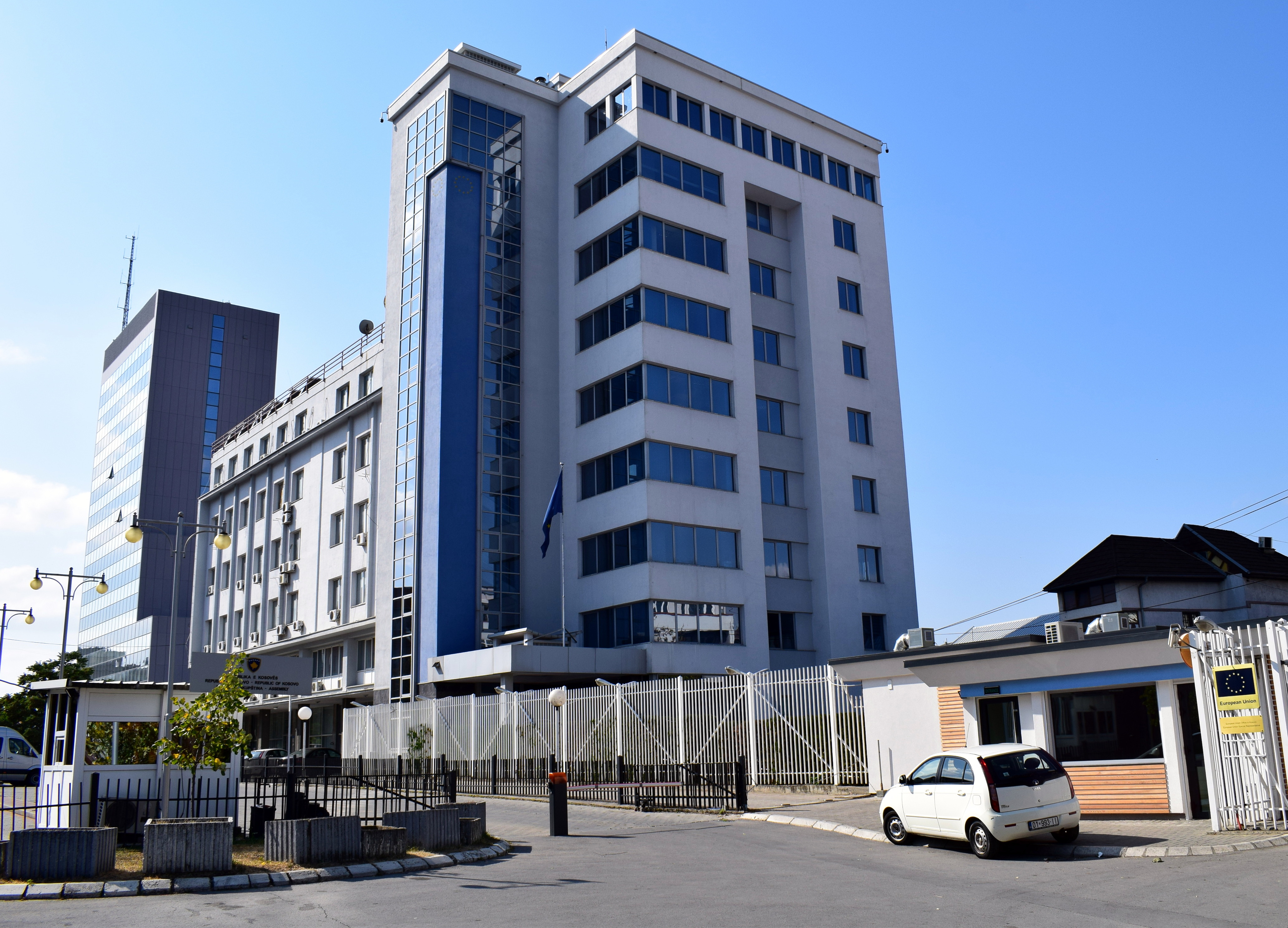
- Address: Kosova Street 1, P.O.Box 331, Pristina, Kosovo
- Permanent representative: Dejan Pavicevic

The Liaison Office of the Government of the Republic of Serbia at the European Union Mission in Pristina is a representative mission of the Government of Serbia at the European Union Mission in Pristina, responsible for the implementation of the Brussels Agreement.

== History ==
Serbia and Kosovo agreed to exchange liaison officers in 2013 under the terms of the Brussels Agreement which sought to aid the normalisation of relations between them. Under the terms of an Ohrid Agreement that was accepted by both parties in March 2023, the liaison offices in each country are to be upgraded to permanent missions. Serbia also agreed to acknowledge Kosovo's national symbols, official documents and customs stamps.

== Location ==
The Liaison Office of the Government of the Republic of Serbia at the European Union Mission in Pristina is located within the premises of the European Union Delegation in Kosovo, Kosova Street 1, P.O.Box 331, Pristina.

== Representatives ==
The current Liaison Officer of the Government of the Republic of Serbia at the European Union Mission in Pristina is Dejan Pavicevic.

== See also ==
- List of diplomatic missions of Serbia
- List of diplomatic missions in Kosovo
- Administrative Boundary Line
- Kosovo–Serbia relations
- Liaison Office of Kosovo, Belgrade
- European Union Special Representative
- Accession of Kosovo to the European Union
