= Liaison Office of Kosovo, Belgrade =

Representative office of Kosovo to Serbia

Liaison Office of Kosovo in Belgrade
- Address: Vladimira Popovica 40A, 11070, Belgrade
- Permanent representative: Jetish Jashari
- Website: Official website

The Liaison Office of Kosovo in Belgrade is a representative mission of the Government of Kosovo in Belgrade, Serbia.

== History ==
Serbia and Kosovo agreed to exchange liaison officers in 2013 under the terms of the Brussels Agreement which sought to aid the normalisation of relations between them. Under the terms of an Ohrid Agreement that was accepted by both parties in March 2023, the liaison offices in each country are to be upgraded to permanent missions. Serbia also agreed to recognise Kosovo's national symbols, official documents and customs stamps.

== Location ==
The liaison office is located at the premises of the European Union Delegation to Serbia, at Vladimira Popovica 40A, 11070, Belgrade, an office complex that also houses the Australian Embassy in Belgrade and a regional office of the European Investment Bank.

== Representatives ==
The current Liaison Officer of Kosovo in Belgrade is Jetish Jashari.

=== List of Liaison Officers ===
- Lulzim Peci (2013–2020)
- Jetish Jashari (2020–present)

== See also ==
- List of diplomatic missions of Kosovo
- List of diplomatic missions in Serbia
- Kosovo–Serbia relations
- Liaison Office of Serbia, Pristina
