= Kosovo–Serbia relations =

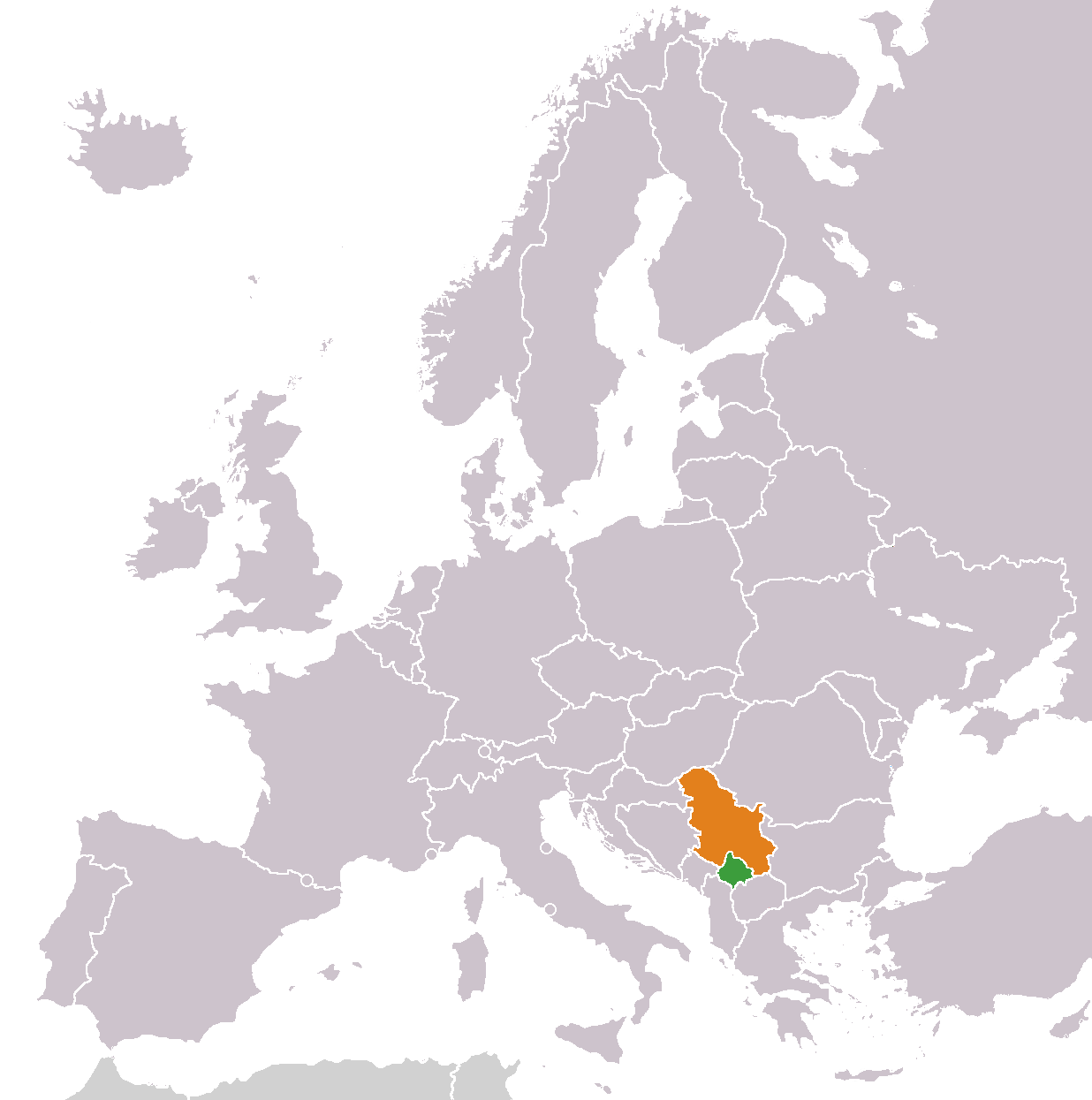
- Kosovo: Serbia

Diplomatic mission
- Liaison Office of Kosovo, Belgrade: Liaison Office of Serbia, Pristina

Envoy
- Jetish Jashari: Dejan Pavićević

Kosovo unilaterally self-proclaimed independence from Serbia in 2008, a move which Serbia strongly rejects. Serbia has not recognized Kosovo as an independent state and continues to claim it as the Autonomous Province of Kosovo and Metohija. However, differences and disputes remain, while North Kosovo partially remains under Serbian influence. Initially, there were no relations between the two, but in the following years, there has been increased dialogue.

Kosovo is not a member state of the United Nations. It is a partially recognized country, with 110 out of 193 UN member states recognizing its independence. According to the international law, and United Nations Security Council Resolution 1244, which ended the Kosovo War, it is claimed by Serbia as the Autonomous Province of Kosovo and Metohija.

Negotiations facilitated by the European Union resulted in the 2013 Brussels Agreement on the normalization of relations between the governments of Kosovo and Serbia. The agreement pledged both sides not to block the other in the EU accession process, defined the structure of the police and local elections in all parts of Kosovo, and also established the proposal of the Community of Serb Municipalities.

The United States-mediated diplomatic talks agreed on the interconnection of air, train and road traffic, while both parties signed the 2020 agreement on the normalisation of economic relations. Kosovo and Serbia are expected to become part of the single market, known as Open Balkan.

Both parties agreed to a proposed normalisation agreement in EU mediated dialogue in February 2023 and through further negotiations accepted a roadmap and timescale for its implementation the following month.

== Reaction to declaration of independence ==
Serbia strongly opposed Kosovo's declaration of independence, which was declared on 17 February 2008. On 12 February 2008, the Government of Serbia instituted an Action Plan to combat Kosovo's anticipated declaration, which stipulated, among other things, recalling the Serbian ambassadors for consultations in protest from any state recognising Kosovo, which it has consistently done. Activities of ambassadors from countries that have recognised independence are limited to meetings with Foreign Ministry lower officials. The Serbian Ministry of the Interior issued arrest warrants against Hashim Thaçi, Fatmir Sejdiu and Jakup Krasniqi on 18 February 2008 on charges of high treason.

On 8 March 2008, the Serbian Prime Minister Vojislav Koštunica resigned, dissolving the coalition government, saying it was too divided over the Kosovo situation to carry on. A pre-term parliamentary election was held on 11 May 2008, together with local elections. President Boris Tadić stated that the government fell "because there was no agreement regarding further EU integration".

Map of states that have recognised Kosovo's independence (as of December 2025) States that recognise Kosovo as independent States that do not recognise Kosovo's independence from Serbia States that no longer recognise Kosovo as independent

On 24 March 2008, Slobodan Samardžić, Minister for Kosovo and Metohija, proposed partitioning Kosovo along ethnic lines, asking the United Nations to ensure that Belgrade can control key institutions and functions in areas where Serbs form a majority but other members of the Government and the President denied these claims. On 25 March 2008, the outgoing Prime Minister, Vojislav Koštunica stated that membership in the EU should be "left aside", until Brussels stated whether it recognised Serbia within its existing borders.

On 24 July 2008, the Government decided to return its ambassadors to EU countries. Other ambassadors were returned following the positive outcome of the vote in the UN General Assembly. Serbia has expelled diplomatic representations of all neighboring countries that subsequently recognised Kosovo's independence: Albania, Bulgaria, Croatia, Hungary, Montenegro, and North Macedonia.

On 15 August 2008, Serbian Foreign Minister Vuk Jeremić filed a request at the United Nations seeking a non-legally binding advisory opinion of the International Court of Justice of whether the declaration of independence was in breach of international law. The United Nations General Assembly adopted this proposal on 8 October 2008. In July 2010, the ICJ issued its opinion which found that Kosovo's declaration of independence "did not violate international law".

== History ==
=== 2008–2013 ===
Since the declaration of independence, Serbia refused to deal directly with the Republic of Kosovo, but only through the international intermediaries UNMIK and EULEX. However, there has been some normalisation; beginning in 2011, an EU team persuaded Serbia to discuss some minor border issues with Kosovo; in February 2013, the presidents of Kosovo and Serbia met in Brussels. Liaison officers are also being exchanged. Belgrade and Pristina are urged to continue talks in Brussels, but Serbia is not obliged to recognize Kosovo at any point in the process.

On 27 March 2012, four Kosovo Serbs, including the mayor of Vitina, were arrested by Kosovo Police while attempting to cross the disputed border at Bela Zemlja back into Kosovo with campaign materials for an upcoming election. They were subsequently charged with "incitement to hatred and intolerance among ethnic groups".

The following day, trade unionist Hasan Abazi was arrested with fellow unionist Adem Urseli by Serbian police manning the Central Serbia/Kosovo crossing near Gjilan. Abazi was charged with espionage and Urseli with drug smuggling. Serbian Interior Minister Ivica Dačić stated of the arrests that "Serbian police did not wish to take this approach, but the situation obviously could no longer go on without retaliation... If someone wants to compete in arrests, we have the answer". According to his lawyer, Abazi was then held in solitary confinement. On 30 March, the Serbian High Court in Vranje ordered Abazi to be detained for thirty days on espionage charges dating to an incident in 1999 in which Abazi allegedly gave information to NATO. Abazi's arrest was protested by Amnesty International and Human Rights Watch as "arbitrary" and "retaliatory".

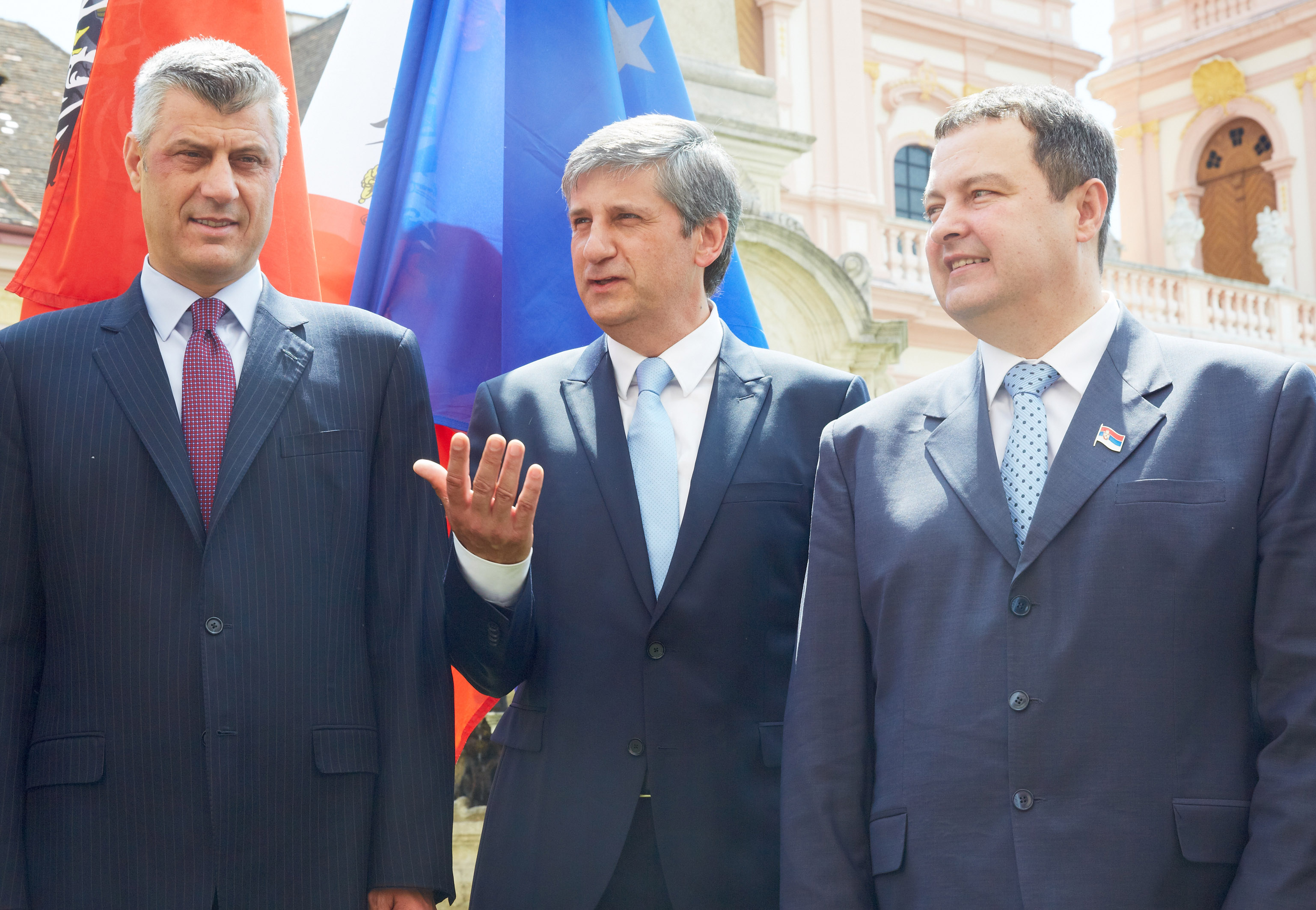
Hashim Thaçi, Prime Minister of Kosovo (left), and Ivica Dačić, Prime Minister of Serbia (right), with Michael Spindelegger (middle) in Vienna, 2013

On 19 October 2012, normalisation talks mediated by the European Union began in Brussels with Serbian Prime Minister Ivica Dačić and Kosovo Prime Minister Hashim Thaçi, where the two PMs sat at the table and initiated talks on normalising relations between Pristina and Belgrade. Reaching such a deal was a necessary condition of Serbia's EU candidacy. The governments slowly reached agreements and deals on various areas, such as freedom of movement, university diplomas, regional representation and on trade and international customs. In Brussels, Serbia and Kosovo agreed that implementation of the border agreement would start on 10 December 2012. A historic meeting took place on 6 February 2013, when Serbian president Tomislav Nikolić and Kosovar President Atifete Jahjaga sat at the same table for the first time since Kosovo declared independence.

Following a December 2012 agreement, the two nations swapped liaison officers who worked at EU premises in the two capitals. Pristina referred to these officers as "ambassadors", but Belgrade rejected such a designation.

Serbia's top officials met with the EU High Representative for Foreign Affairs and Security Policy Catherine Ashton in Brussels, on 11 March 2013, Serbian president Nikolić said that Serbia and Kosovo were very close to signing an agreement which would improve their relations.

On 19 April 2013, the two governments completed the Brussels Agreement that was hailed as a major step towards normalising relations, and would allow both Serbia and Kosovo to advance in European integration. The agreement is reported to commit both states not to "block, or encourage others to block, the other side's progress in the respective EU paths." Serbia can block Kosovo in international organizations, but it cannot stand in the way of Kosovo's European integration process. Amongst other measures the deal establishes a special police commander (Commander will be appointed by Pristina from a list submitted by Serbs) and appeal court (Under Pristina laws and procedures) for the Serb minority in Kosovo, but does not amount to a recognition of Kosovo's independence by Belgrade. In news reports Ashton was quoted as saying, "What we are seeing is a step away from the past and, for both of them, a step closer to Europe", whilst Thaçi declared "This agreement will help us heal the wounds of the past if we have the wisdom and the knowledge to implement it in practice."

The agreement also defined the structure of the police and local elections, called for integration of Serbian institutions into the Kosovo police and judicial authorities within Kosovo's legal framework and also established the proposal of the Community of Serb Municipalities. The Community of Serb Munucipalities would include the four Serb-run northern municipalities of North Mitrovica, Leposavić, Zvečan and Zubin Potok. The deal envisaged the withdrawal of Serbian presence in the north, in exchange for the expansion of self-governance for Kosovo Serbs.

The accord was ratified by the Kosovo assembly on 28 June 2013.

=== 2013 Brussels Agreement ===
Kosovo–Serbia negotiations encountered difficulties in the wake of the agreement reached in Brussels.

On 7 August 2013, an agreement was announced between the two governments to establish permanent border crossings between Serbia and Kosovo throughout 2014. These are complex, highly emotive issues the details of which can be worked out gradually, in step with Kosovo's and Serbia's EU accession processes. For five member states, the question of Kosovo's independence is not about Kosovo per se: it is a question of local politics.

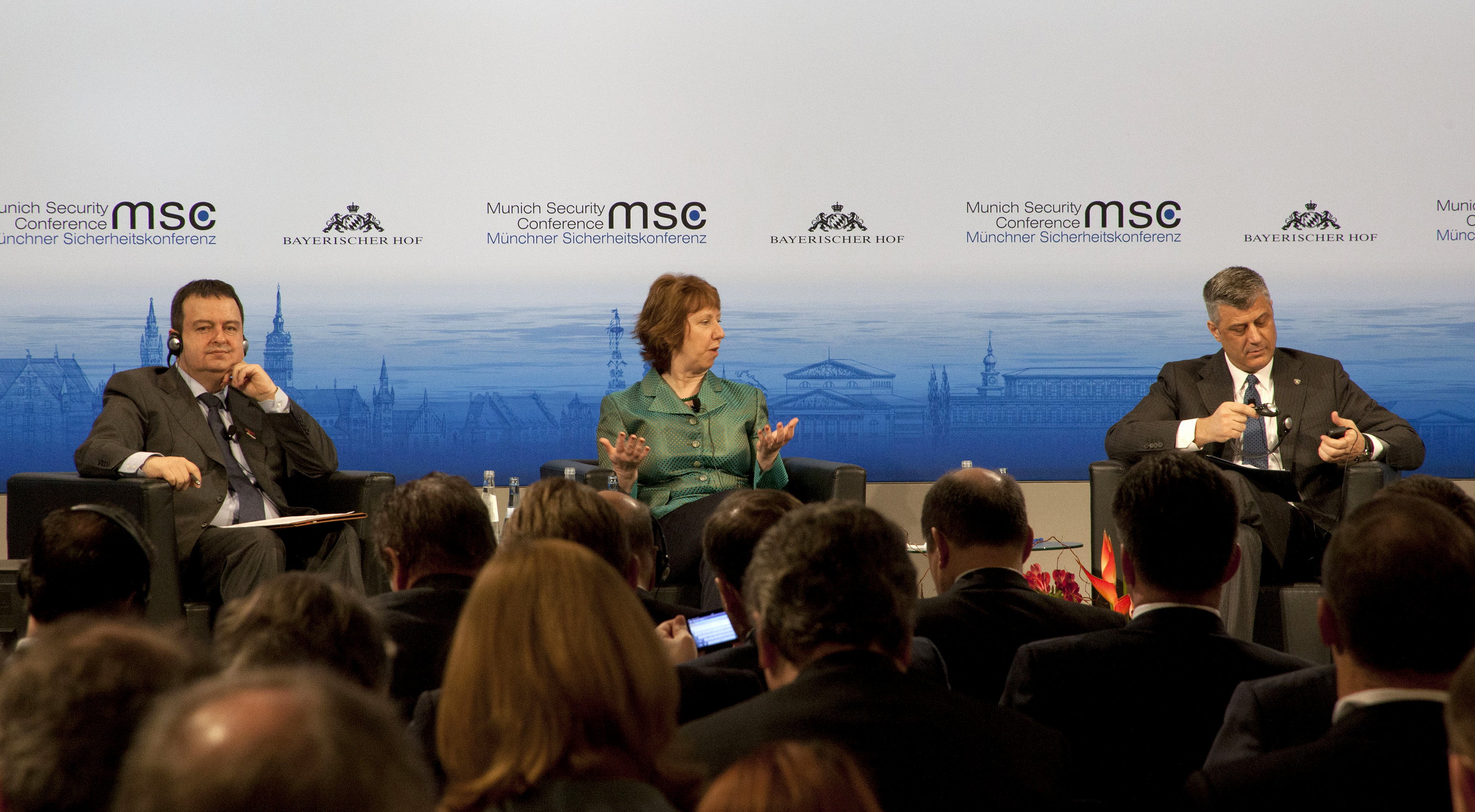
Ivica Dačić, Prime Minister of Serbia (left), and Hashim Thaçi, Prime Minister of Kosovo (right), with Catherine Ashton (middle) in Munich, 2014.

On 9 September 2013, an agreement was reached to allow Kosovo to apply for its own international dialling code. Two days later, the Serbian government announced the dissolution of the Serb minority assemblies it created in northern Kosovo in order to allow the integration of the Kosovo Serb minority into the general Kosovo population. In order to facilitate the integration of the Serb minority in the north into Kosovar society, the Kosovo parliament passed an amnesty law pardoning for past acts of resistance to Kosovo authorities. This principle was put into effect in early December, as the governments of Serbia and Kosovo agreed to the appointment of a Kosovo Serb as chief of police in the Serbian area of Northern Kosovo. The two governments also reached agreement in principle to allow Kosovo to apply for its own international dialing code once the Serbian government begins EU accession talks. On 19 September, a EULEX officer was killed in the Serb area of Kosovo in a drive by shooting, this murder viewed as an act by opponents of reconciliation.

In late 2014, Kosovo–Serbia negotiations reached standstill owing to the change of government in Kosovo which now advocated a more hardline approach towards Serbia. More difficulties arose in December 2014, as President of Serbia Tomislav Nikolic went against the position of the government by stating that any decision on Kosovo must be submitted to a referendum.

On 26 August 2015, Kosovo and Serbia signed a series of agreements in key areas, in a major step towards normalizing ties. Kosovo's foreign minister claimed it was a de facto recognition of independence, while Serbia's prime minister said it ensured representation for ethnic-Serbs in Kosovo. As a result of the agreements, Serbia can now move forward with its negotiations to join the EU. However, the Serbian government still opposes any initiative by the government of Kosovo joining UN agencies, and Kosovo's initiative regarding UNESCO membership was met with protest by Belgrade.

=== Community of Serbian Municipalities ===
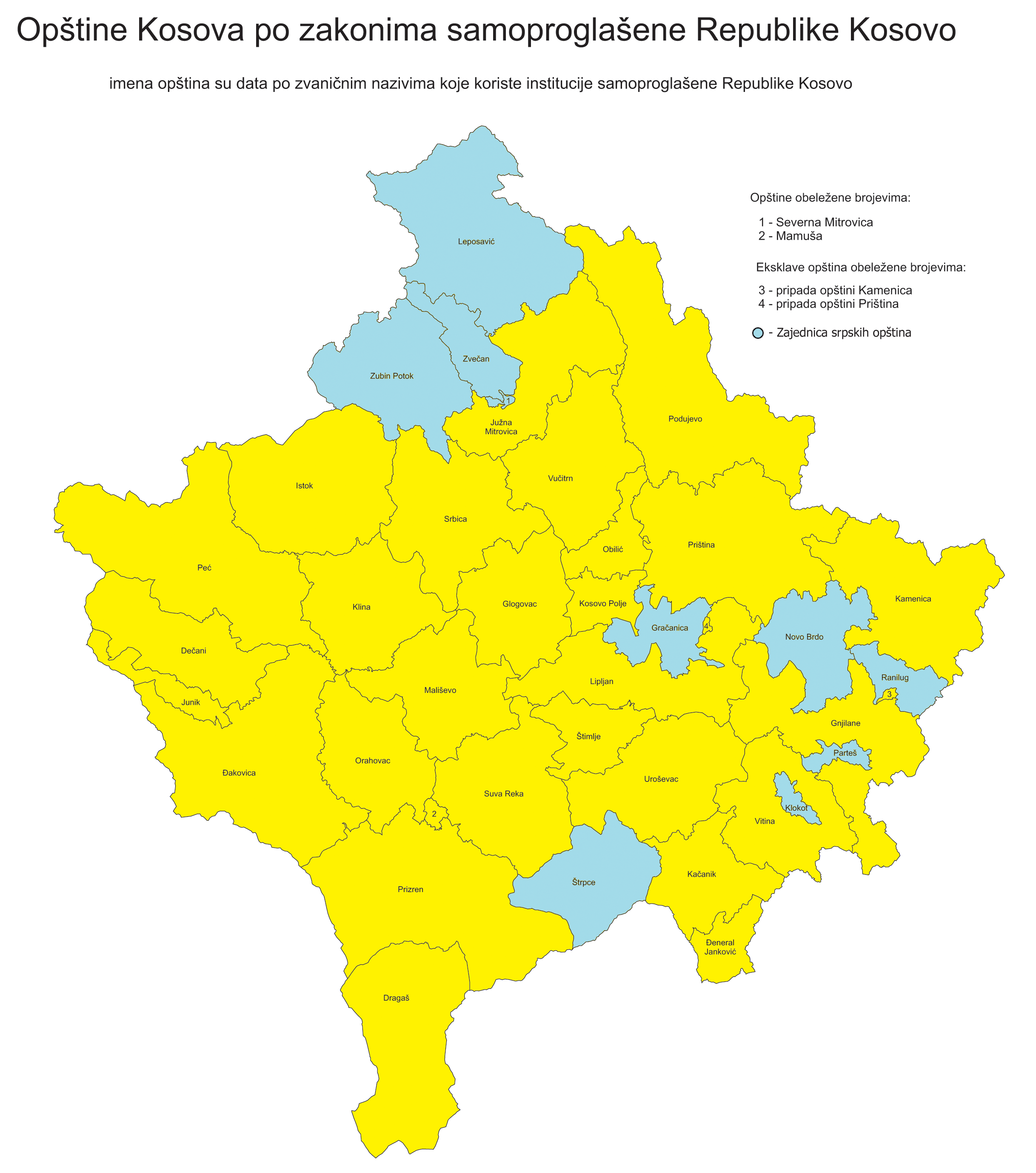
Municipalities of Kosovo as organized by the Republic of Kosovo Community of Serb Municipalities

On 13 December 2016, at the 3511th Council of the European Union meeting, the delegates urged Kosovo to swiftly implement in good faith its part of all past agreements, in particular the establishment of the Association/Community of Serb majority municipalities and to engage constructively with Serbia in formulating and implementing future agreements. On 29 December 2016, the Minister of Foreign Affairs Ivica Dačić noted the significance of maintaining the dialogue and implementing all agreements, primarily those that apply to establishing the Community of Serb Municipalities. On 30 December 2016, Kosovo President Hashim Thaçi had stated that he hopes the questions of the Community would be resolved at the beginning of 2017. That never occurred, and deep divisions followed within the government.

=== 2017 train incident ===
In January 2017, a train painted in Serbian flag colors and with the words "Kosovo is Serbia" was prevented from crossing into Kosovo. Serbian President Tomislav Nikolić stated that Serbia would send its army to Kosovo if Kosovo Serbs are attacked. Kosovo viewed the train as a provocation. Both Serbia and Kosovo mobilized their military forces along the Kosovo-Serbian border.

=== 2018 Kosovo arrest of Serbian politician ===
Kosovar special police arrested Serbian politician Marko Đurić visiting Northern Mitrovica in March 2018. Despite being banned from entering Kosovo and warnings by the Kosovo police, Đurić decided to visit the northern part of Mitrovica. The Kosovo police armed with rifles followed by EULEX entered premises where local Serb politicians were having a meeting and arrested Đurić, who according to Pacolli is banned from entering as he "encourages hatred". Commenting on the event, President Vučić called the Kosovo state and police terrorists, and that they were out to take over northern Kosovo.

=== Trade sanctions (2018–2020) ===
On 6 November 2018, Kosovo announced a 10% tax on goods imported from Serbia and Bosnia-Herzegovina. The official justification for the new tariff was unfair trade practices and destructive behaviour aimed at Kosovo.

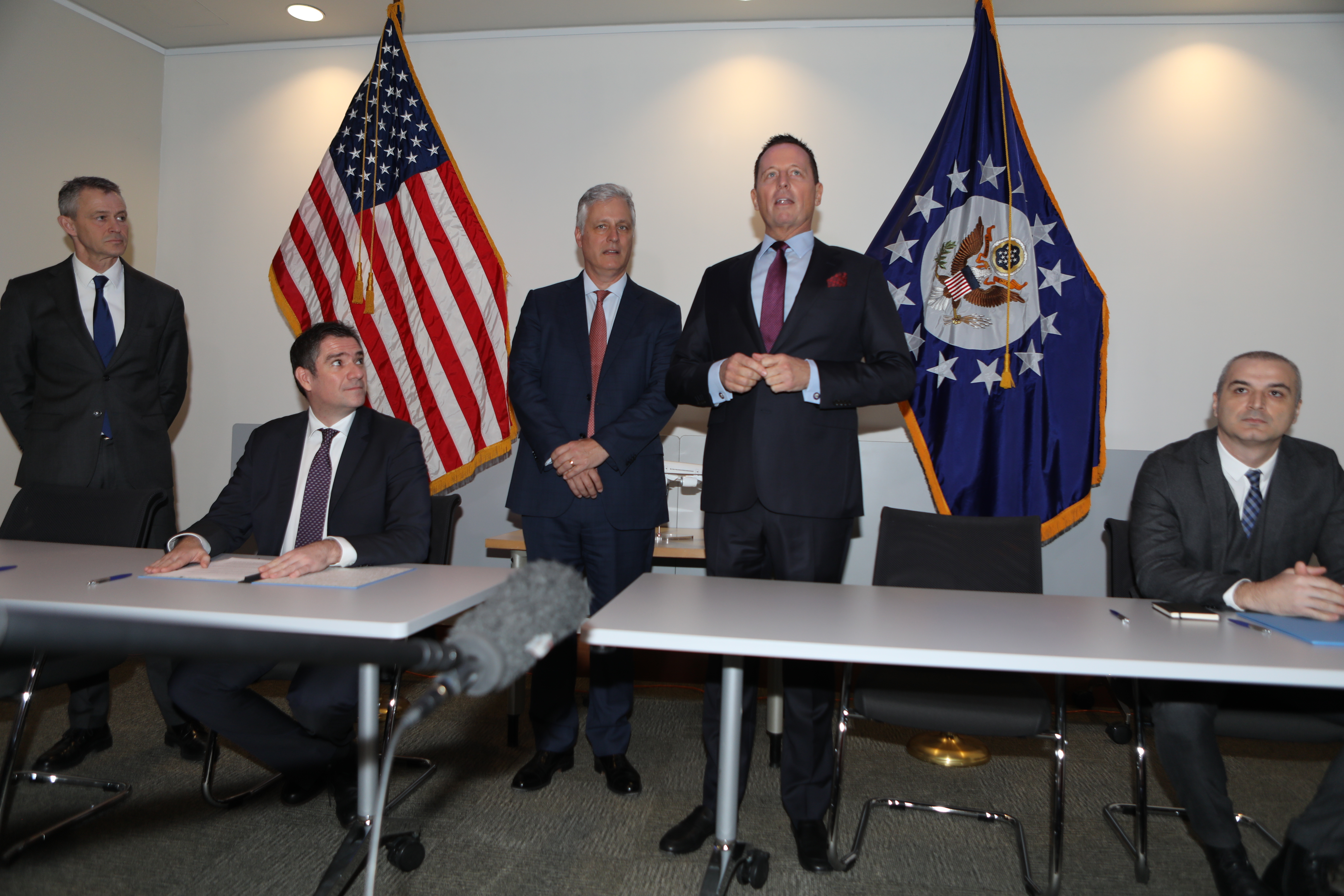
Milun Trivunac, State Secretary of the Ministry of Economy of Serbia (sitting left), Richard Grenell, Special US Presidential Envoy for Serbia and Kosovo Peace Negotiations (standing right), Eset Berisha, Director of the Civil Aviation Authority of Kosovo (sitting right)

On 21 November 2018, Kosovo announced an increase in the tax rate to 100%. It is believed that the new policy was a response to Kosovo's third failed bid for Interpol membership, a result widely blamed on Serbian campaigning by Kosovar public officials. On the day of the announcement, the Deputy Prime Minister Enver Hoxhaj publicly tweeted: "Serbia is continuing its aggressive campaign against Kosovo in the int’l stage. [...] To defend our vital interest, [the] Government of Kosovo has decided today to increase the customs tariff to 100%. [...]"

On 1 April 2020, Kosovo abolished the 100% tax.

=== Energy transmission networks separation ===
In April 2020 Kosovo's Transmission System Operator, KOSTT, was formally separated from Elektromreža Srbije through a vote by the European Network of Transmission System Operators for Electricity, ENTSO-E, which paved the way for Kosovo to become an independent regulatory zone for electricity.

The agreement was criticized in Serbia, who accused Pristina and Tirana of pursuing a "Greater Albania of energy". Marko Djuric, the Serbian government's liaison for Kosovo released a statement saying that "Serbia is the owner and builder of the power grids in Kosovo and Metohija, for which there is abundant evidence".

=== 2020 Washington Agreement ===
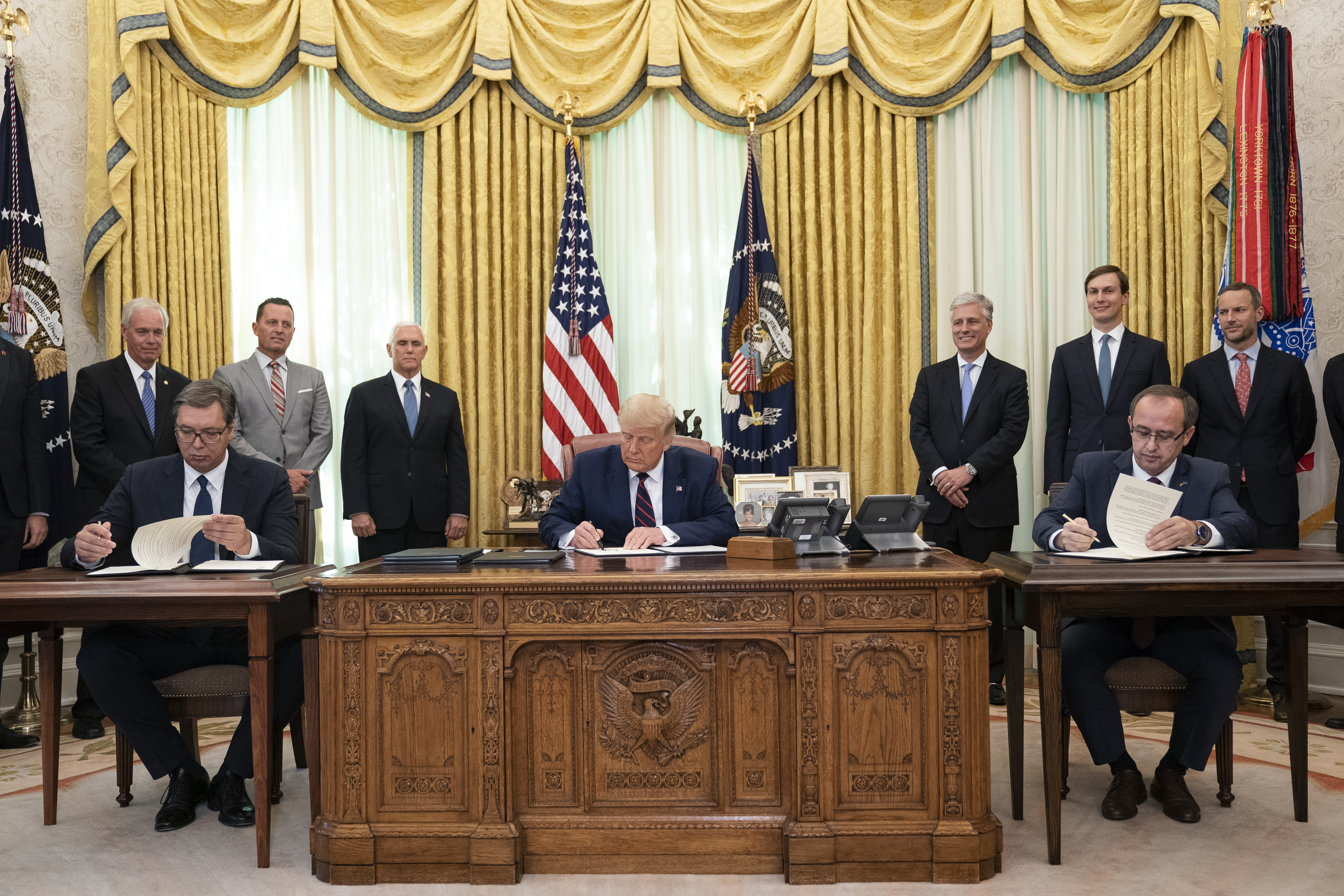
Aleksandar Vučić, President of Serbia (left), Donald Trump, President of the United States (middle), and Avdullah Hoti, Prime Minister of Kosovo (right), signing the 2020 Kosovo and Serbia economic agreements in the White House, 2020

On 4 September 2020, under a deal brokered by the United States, Serbia and Kosovo agreed to normalise economic relations. The deal will encompass freer transit, including by rail and road, while both parties agreed to work with the Export–Import Bank of the United States and the United States International Development Finance Corporation and to join the Mini Schengen Zone, but also to commence rail links between them such as Niš-Pristina and Pristina-Merdare and to connect the Belgrade-Pristina rail network with a deep seaport on the coast of the Adriatic Sea They will also conduct a feasibility study with the United States Department of Energy concerning the shared Gazivoda Lake, which straddles the border between the two states. In addition to the economic agreement, Serbia agreed to move its embassy in Israel to Jerusalem from Tel Aviv starting in June 2021 and Israel and Kosovo agreed to mutually recognise each other.

=== 2020 Brussels Talks ===
On 7 September, Serbian President Aleksandar Vučić and Kosovo Prime Minister Avdullah Hoti met for talks in Brussels hosted by Josep Borrell under the auspices of the European Union. At a press conference after the talks EU Special Representative for the Serbia-Kosovo Dialogue, Miroslav Lajcak, stated that "full progress" had been made in the areas of economic cooperation, missing persons and displaced people. Vučić and Hoti were supposed to meet again in Brussels on 28 September 2020 where they would discuss arrangements for minority communities, the settlement of mutual financial claims and property and will attempt to make progress towards a more comprehensive agreement. The second meeting was later postponed, in part due to Kosovo's refusal to discuss the formation of the Association/Community of Serb-majority municipalities.

=== 2022 tensions ===
On 31 July, sirens in northern Kosovo sounded which resulted in Kosovo Serbs blocking the road near the Jarinje border crossing (located in the municipality of Leposavić). Serbian President Aleksandar Vučić said to the media, that Serbia has "never been in a more complex and difficult situation [regarding Kosovo] than it is today".

On 27 August, EU-facilitated dialogue between the Republic of Serbia and the Republic of Kosovo settled the dispute regarding identification documents. Serbia agreed to abolish entry and exit documents for Kosovo ID holders whilst Kosovo committed to refrain from implementing such measures for Serbian ID holders. Serbian President Aleksander Vučić stated that the ID card issue was “a tiny problem”, but the licence plate one was “much more complicated”.

On 3 October 2022, the far-right Serbian Party Oathkeepers together with the People's Party, New Democratic Party of Serbia, and Dveri, signed a joint declaration for the "reintegration of Kosovo into the constitutional and legal order of Serbia" in October 2022.

=== 2023 Ohrid Agreement ===
In December 2022, the European Union forwarded a draft agreement to the authorities in Serbia and Kosovo at the EU-Western Balkans summit in Tirana. The proposed agreement is based on a previous draft drawn up by the French and German governments earlier in 2022. Under the terms of the draft agreement, both sides would agree to "develop normal, good neighborly relations with each other on the basis of equal right" and that "both parties will recognize each other's relevant documents and national symbols, including passports, diplomas, vehicle plates and customs stamps." The draft agreement further adds that Serbia will not oppose membership of Kosovo in any international organizations and Kosovo will form an "appropriate level of self-management for the Serbian community in Kosovo. Both parties will exchange permanent missions in their respective capitals. The proposal also allows for the formation of a joint commission, chaired by the EU, for monitoring its implementation. The EU hopes that the agreement could be signed by the end of 2023 and negotiations regarding the proposed agreement are expected begin in mid-January.

The final text, known as "Agreement on the path to normalization between Kosovo and Serbia", was reported to have been agreed in principle by Kosovo prime minister Albin Kurti and Serbian president Aleksandar Vučić on 27 February 2023 at a meeting in Brussels with EU High Representative for Foreign Affairs and Security Policy Josep Borrell and EU Special Representative for the Belgrade-Pristina Dialogue Miroslav Lajčák. Kurti and Vučić met again on 18 March at Ohrid, North Macedonia and verbally accepted a roadmap for implementation of the agreement.

=== Kosovo's candidacy to the Council of Europe ===
Since 2022 Kosovo has been trying to join the Council of Europe. In early March it increased chances for the membership by ending an eight-year stalemate and granting 24 disputed hectares of land to the Serbian Orthodox Decani monastery. Later that month the Council of Europe's Parliamentary Assembly Committee on Political Affairs and Democracy voted to recommend that Kosovo joined the international human rights organisation, despite Serbia's strong opposition. In response Serbia threatened to quit the Council of Europe after more than 20 years of membership if Kosovo was admitted. Serbian president Alexander Vučić referred to CoE rapporteur Dora Bakoyannis as a "shameful woman" for recommending Kosovo's membership in her draft opinion to the assembly.

In April 2023, Serbia, along with Azerbaijan, Cyprus, Georgia, Hungary, Romania and Spain, voted against approving Kosovo's membership in the Council of Europe. By voting against Kosovo's membership, and encouraging other countries to also do so, Serbia appeared to have violated the terms of the 2023 Ohrid Agreement.

=== Recent period ===
In February 2024, Kosovo implemented a euro-only policy. It sparked protests in North Mitrovica as the dinar currency was still used daily by Kosovo Serbs, especially in the Serb-majority north. After being condemned by the international society, Pristina decided to provide a three-month transitional period. Belgrade refused to use euro in Kosovo-Serbia relations and said it would continue to fund Kosovo Serbs in dinars. Kosovo's government has stated that the measures will aid in the fight against money laundering and terrorism.

On May 20, in pursuit of its policy of outlawing the continued use of the Serbian currency in Kosovo, police closed six offices of the Serbia-run Post Saving Bank in the north. The operation came days after another European Union-facilitated meeting in Brussels between Kosovo and Serbia produced no results.

In August, Kosovo police closed nine post offices run by Pošta Srbije (Serbian Post) in the north of Kosovo. The US, the EU and Serbia condemned these actions, calling them an attempt to spark the conflict.

Experts say that the dialogue on the normalisation of relations between Kosovo and Serbia appears to be moving towards a troubling scenario in which 'no solution is a solution' may become the default stance of the international community.

In October, the Government of Kosovo decided to lift its ban on Serbian goods, imposed in June 2023, at one border crossing. That released the block of free trade in the region in accordance with CEFTA.

== Representation ==
Under the terms of the Brussels Agreement signed in 2013, the governments of Serbia and Kosovo agreed to post liaison officers in each other's capitals. The Government of Kosovo is represented in Serbia by the Liaison Office of Kosovo in Belgrade and likewise the Government of Serbia is represented in Kosovo by the Liaison Office of Serbia in Pristina. Both these missions are hosted by the European Union. Under the terms of the 2023 Ohrid Agreement that was accepted by both parties, the liaison offices in each country are to be upgraded to Permanent Missions.

== Minorities ==
Since the 1999 bombing of Yugoslavia, a large portion of Kosovo Serbs have been displaced from their homes, like other minorities throughout the province. A significant portion of Serbian Orthodox churches, as well as Serbian cemeteries and homes, have been demolished or vandalised.

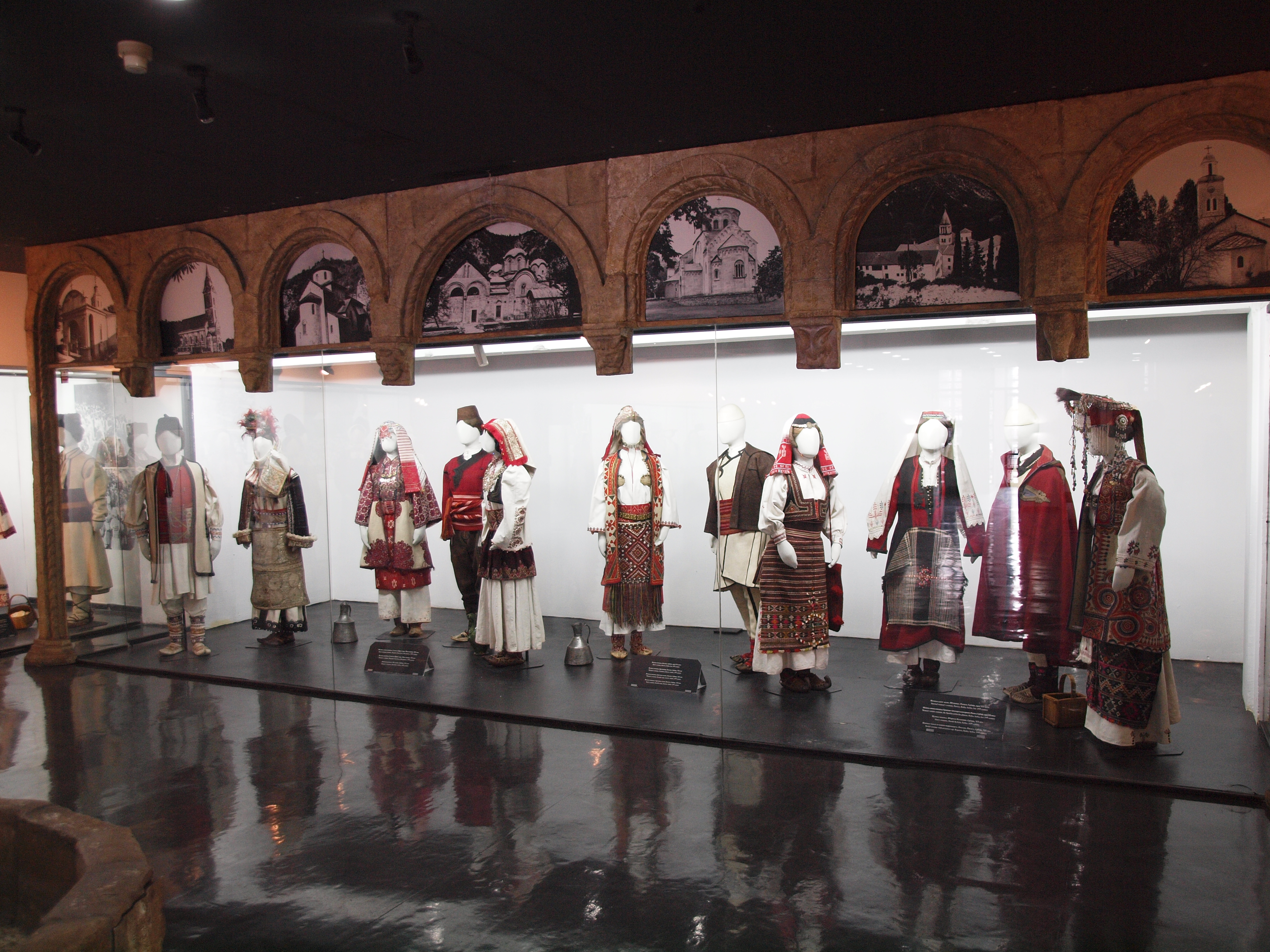
Albanian and Serbian traditional clothing from Kosovo

The Government of Serbia promised suspended Serb prison workers from Lipljan money if they were to leave the Kosovo institutions, which they were working in, so they did. However they were never paid, so staged a continued a blockade of the Co-ordination Centre in Gračanica. They claim that Belgrade, the Kosovo Ministry specifically, has not paid them money promised for leaving the Kosovo institutions.

Serbs have also responded by forming their own assembly.

In 2013, the Government of Serbia dismantled the Serb minority assemblies in North Mitrovica, Leposavić, Zvečan and Zubin Potok as part of an agreement with the government of Kosovo. At the same time, the President of Kosovo signed a law that granted amnesty to ethnic Serbs in Kosovo for past acts of resistance to Kosovo law enforcement authorities.

Kosovo pays considerable attention to the Albanian minority in Serbia. The Albanian minority in Serbia has voiced support for more rights in line with the rights of Serbs in Kosovo. In 2013, Isa Mustafa, then one of the leaders of opposition in Kosovo, referring to the Brussels Agreement said that "Once the programme for implementing the agreement is finished, Kosovo and Serbia have to open a discussion about the issue of the rights that Albanians who live in Preševo and in Serbia enjoy".

== Sports ==
Kosovo is a full member of several international sporting organizations; this has caused conflict and tension when events are hosted in Serbia when Kosovo is to officially compete as its own country.

=== 2021 AIBA World Boxing Championships ===
Kosovo's boxing team was denied entry into Serbia at border control, shutting them out of the tournament.

=== 2022 World Athletics Indoor Championships ===
World Athletics, Kosovo, and Serbia reached a compromise where athletes from Kosovo would be allowed to compete at the 2022 World Athletics Indoor Championships in Belgrade, Serbia but a blank space would be displayed instead of Kosovo's flag on all official materials (including websites and stadium screens).

=== 2022 European Youth Table Tennis Championships ===
In July 2022, competitors from Kosovo were prevented from participating in the European Youth Table Tennis Championships held in Belgrade, Serbia.

== See also ==
- Foreign relations of Kosovo
- International recognition of Kosovo
