= List of diplomatic missions in Kosovo =

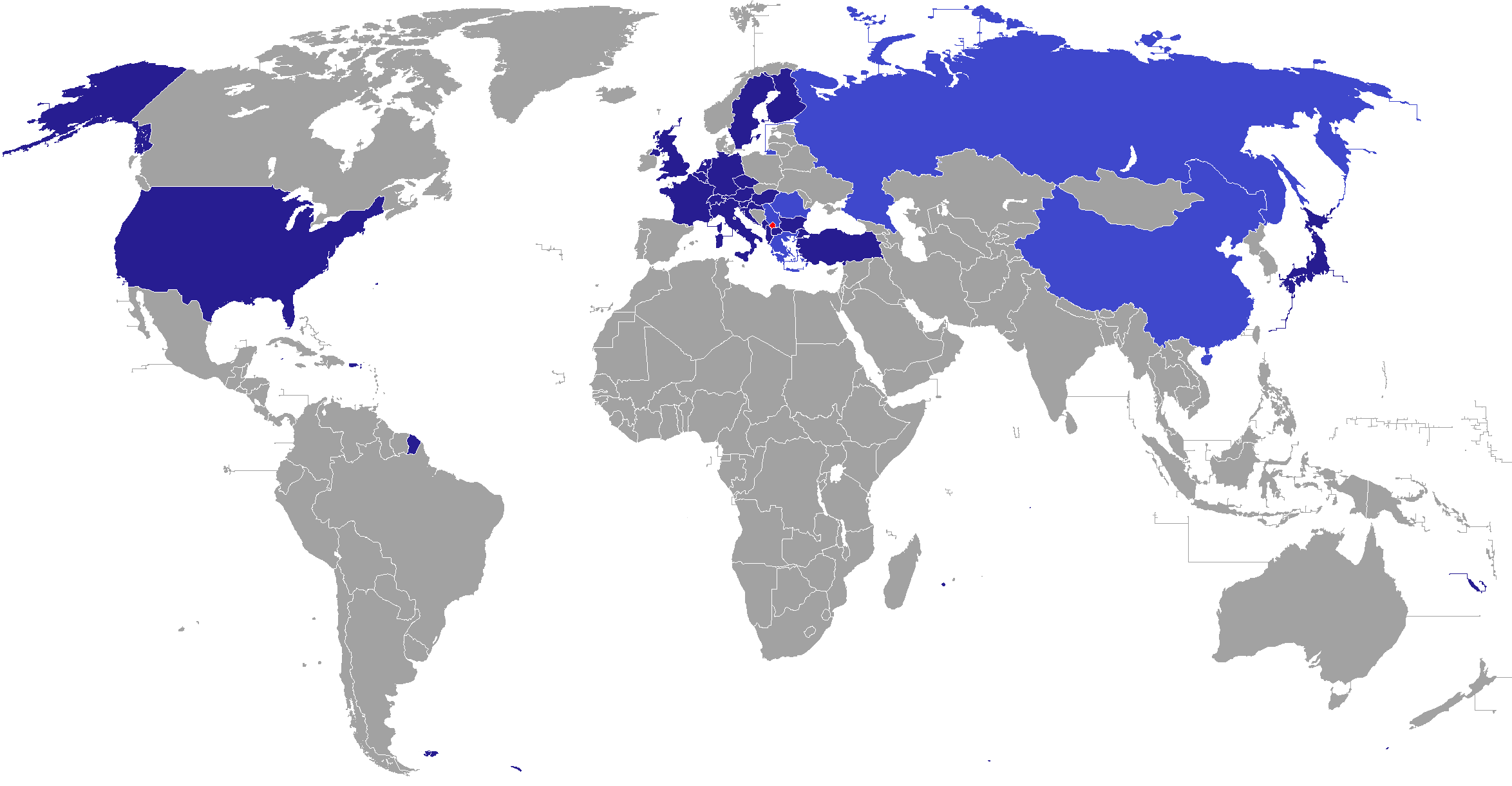
Diplomatic missions in Kosovo Kosovo Country with an embassy in Kosovo

The Republic of Kosovo is recognised by 110 UN member states, as well as the Republic of China (Taiwan), Sovereign Military Order of Malta, the Cook Islands and Niue; 22 of which have opened embassies in Pristina. Other states have retained representation offices.

== Missions in Pristina ==
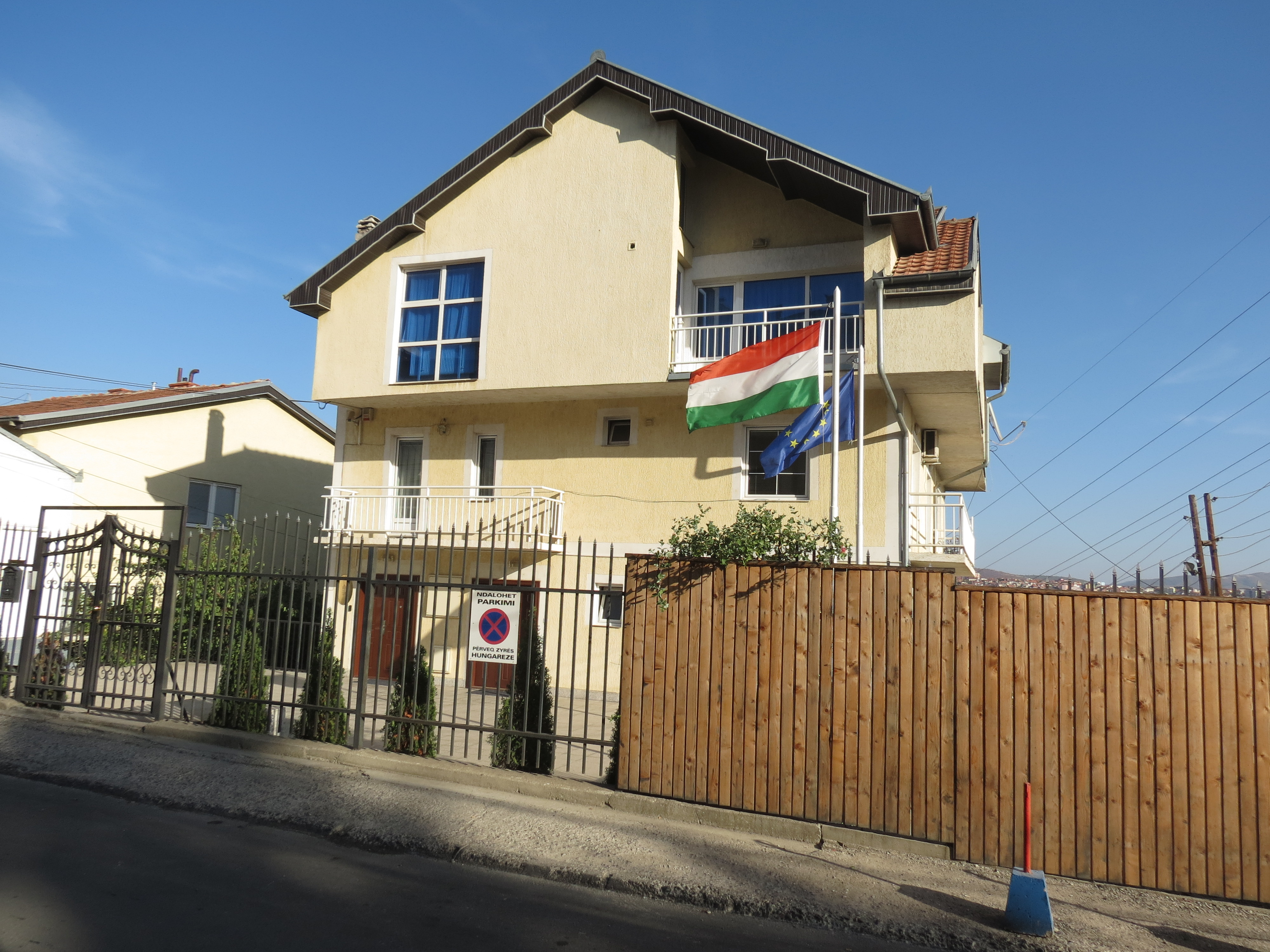
Embassy of Hungary in Pristina

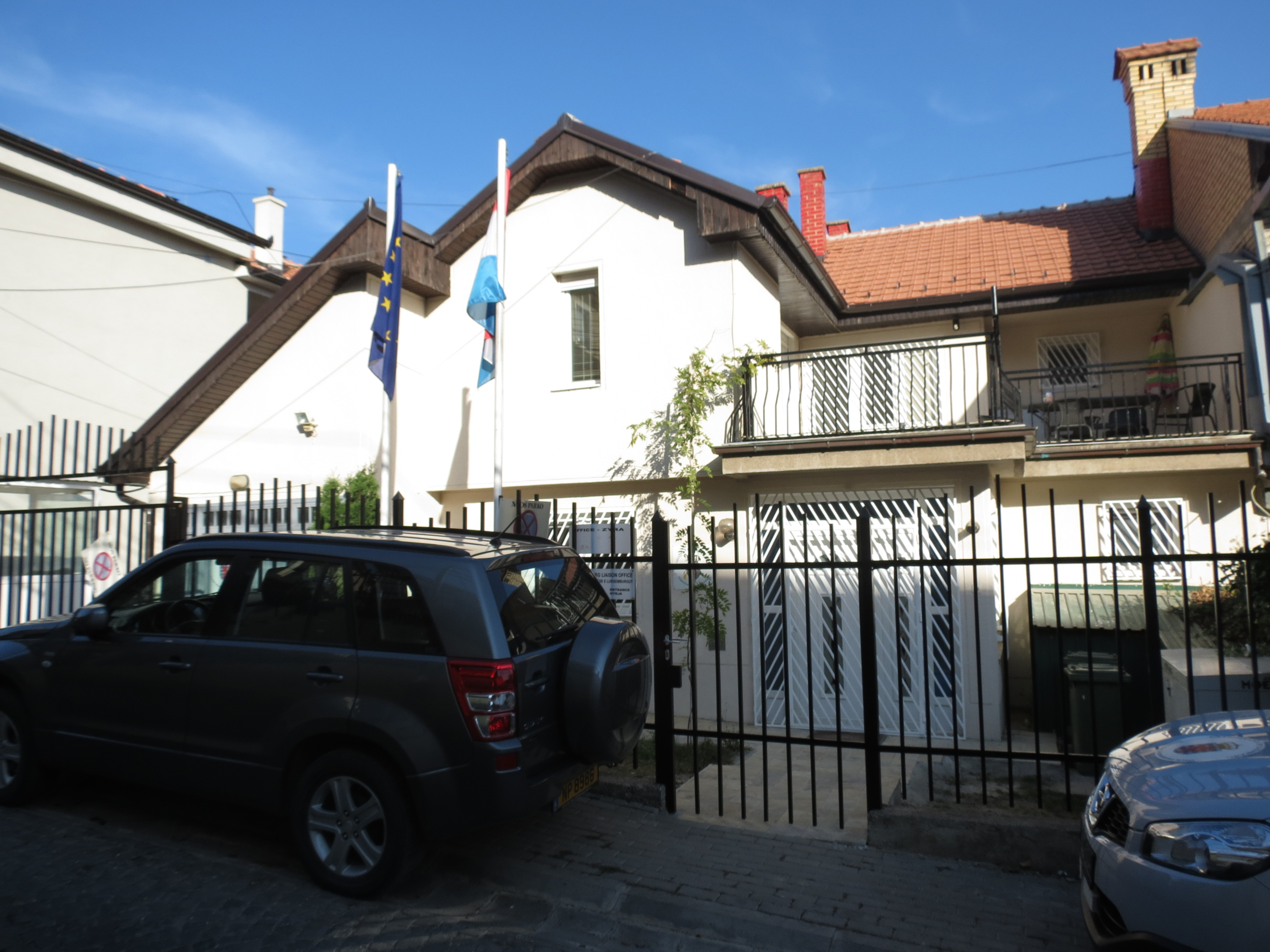
Embassy of Luxembourg in Pristina

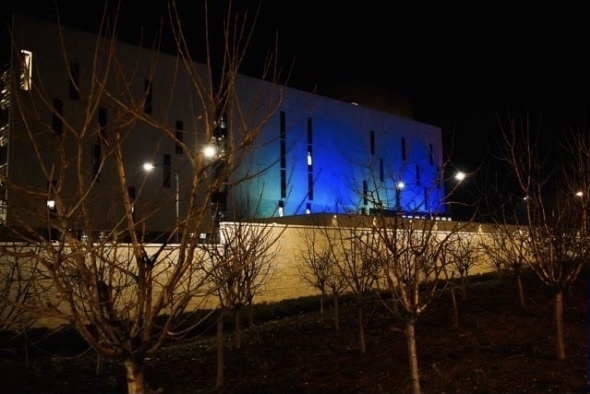
Embassy of the United States in Pristina

=== Embassies ===
1. Albania
2. Austria
3. Belgium
4. Bulgaria
5. Croatia
6. Czech Republic
7. Finland
8. France
9. Germany
10. Hungary
11. Italy
12. Japan
13. Luxembourg
14. Montenegro
15. Netherlands
16. North Macedonia
17. Slovenia
18. Sweden
19. Switzerland
20. Turkey
21. United Kingdom (details)
22. United States (details)

=== Liaison offices ===
- China (Note: No diplomatic relations or diplomatic recognition.)
- Greece
- Romania
- Russia
- Serbia (details)

=== International organisations ===
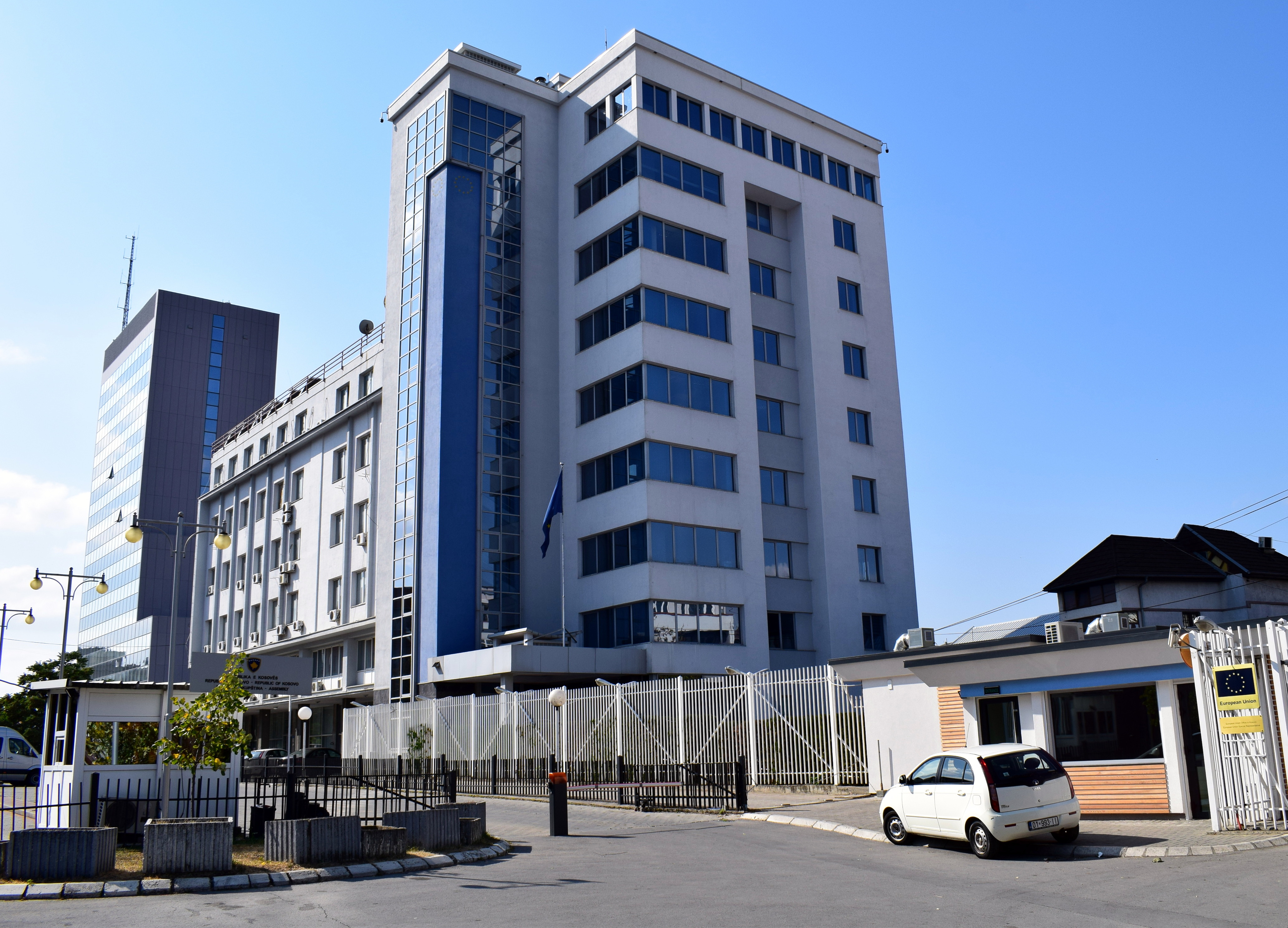
European Union office in Kosovo

- Council of Europe
- European Union (EULEX)
- Organization for Security and Co-operation in Europe (OMiK)
- International Monetary Fund
- United Nations (UNMIK)
- World Bank

== Consular missions ==
In Prizren

- Turkey (Consulate-General)
- Hungary (Consulate-General) October 2022

== Closed missions ==
- Slovakia (Liaison Office) - closed in 2024
- Norway (Embassy) - 2023

== Non-resident accredited missions ==
=== Embassies ===
- Afghanistan (Sofia)
- Australia (Zagreb)
- Bangladesh (Berlin)
- Canada (Zagreb)
- Colombia (Rome)
- Denmark (Vienna)
- Estonia (Vienna)
- Ghana (Ankara)
- Guinea (Berlin)
- Honduras (Brussels)
- Ireland (Budapest)
- Jordan (Ankara)
- Kuwait (Tirana)
- Latvia (Prague)
- Libya (Tirana)
- Lithuania (Zagreb)
- Malaysia (Rome)
- Malta (La Valletta)
- Mauritania (Rome)
- Pakistan (Ankara)
- Panama (Vienna)
- Poland (Skopje)
- Portugal (Budapest)
- Qatar (Tirana)
- San Marino (San Marino)
- Saudi Arabia (Tirana)
- South Korea (Vienna)
- United Arab Emirates (Podgorica)

=== Other missions ===
- (Vatican City) Holy See - Apostolic Delegation (Ljubljana)

== See also ==
- List of diplomatic missions of Kosovo
- Foreign relations of Kosovo
