= List of diplomatic missions of Kosovo =

Diplomatic Missions of Kosovo Kosovo States hosting a Kosovar embassy Kosovo will open embassies soon States that host Kosovar liaison offices

This page is a list of diplomatic missions of Kosovo. Kosovo maintains 34 embassies abroad. Since Kosovo's declaration of independence, it has been recognised by 110 UN member states, as well as the Sovereign Military Order of Malta, the Cook Islands and Niue.

== Africa ==
- Senegal
  - Dakar (Embassy)

== Americas ==
- Canada
  - Ottawa (Embassy)
  - Toronto (Consulate General)
- Colombia
  - Bogotá (Embassy)
- Panama
  - Panama City (Embassy)
- United States
  - Washington, D.C. (Embassy)
  - New York City (Consulate General)
  - Des Moines (Consulate)

== Asia ==
- Bangladesh
  - Dhaka (Embassy)
- Israel
  - Jerusalem (Embassy)
- Japan
  - Tokyo (Embassy)
- Malaysia
  - Kuala Lumpur (Embassy)
- Qatar
  - Doha (Embassy)
- Saudi Arabia
  - Riyadh (Embassy)
- Thailand
  - Bangkok (Embassy)
- Turkey
  - Ankara (Embassy)
  - Istanbul (Consulate General)
- United Arab Emirates
  - Abu Dhabi (Embassy)

== Europe ==
- Albania
  - Tirana (Embassy)
- Austria
  - Vienna (Embassy)
- Belgium
  - Brussels (Embassy)
- Bulgaria
  - Sofia (Embassy)
- Croatia
  - Zagreb (Embassy)
- Czech Republic
  - Prague (Embassy)
- Denmark
  - Copenhagen (Consulate)
- France
  - Paris (Embassy)
  - Strasbourg (Consulate General)
- Germany
  - Berlin (Embassy)
  - Frankfurt (Consulate)
  - Düsseldorf (Consulate General)
  - Munich (Consulate General)
  - Stuttgart (Consulate)
- Greece
  - Athens (Liaison Office)
- Hungary
  - Budapest (Embassy)
- Italy
  - Rome (Embassy)
  - Milan (Consulate General)
  - Bari (Consular Office)
- Montenegro
  - Podgorica (Embassy)
- Netherlands
  - The Hague (Embassy)
- North Macedonia
  - Skopje (Embassy)
  - Struga (Consulate General)
- Norway
  - Oslo (Embassy)
- Poland
  - Warsaw (Consulate General)
- Portugal
  - Lisbon (Embassy)
- Serbia
  - Belgrade (Liaison office)
- Slovenia
  - Ljubljana (Embassy)
- Sweden
  - Stockholm (Embassy)
- Switzerland
  - Bern (Embassy)
  - Geneva (Consulate-General)
  - Zurich (Consulate)
- United Kingdom
  - London (Embassy)

== Oceania ==
- Australia
  - Canberra (Embassy)

== Gallery ==
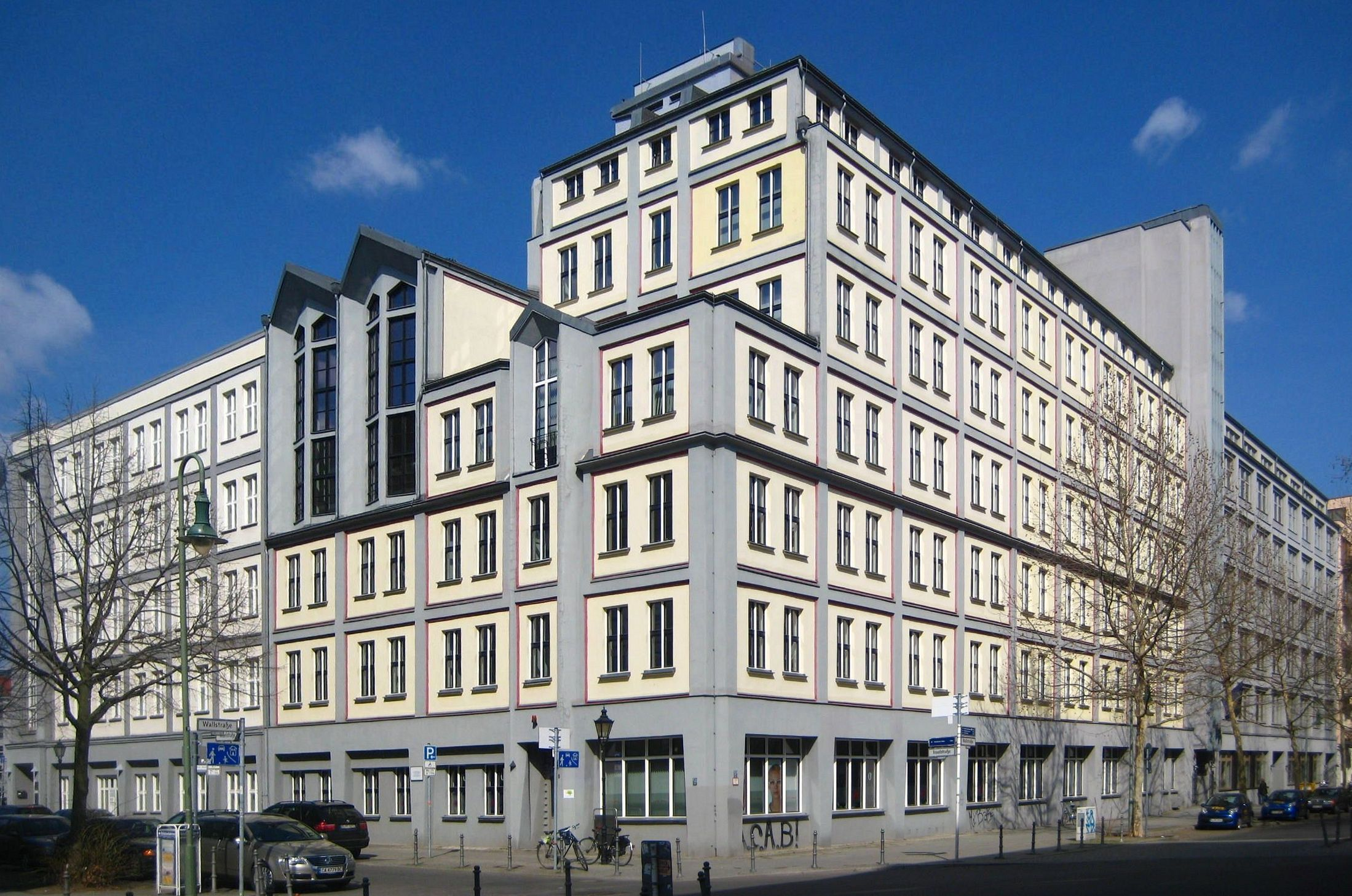
Embassy in Berlin

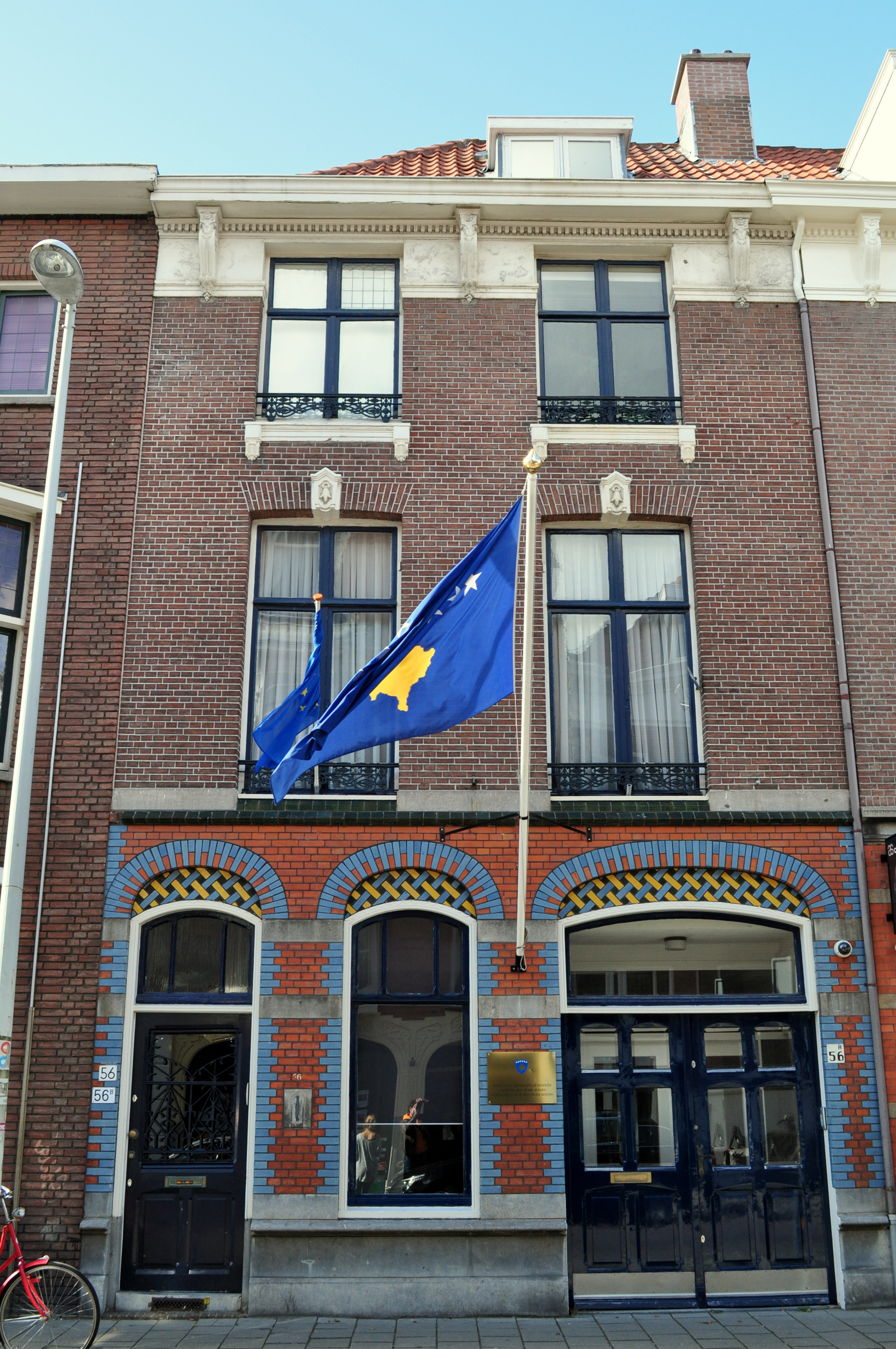
Embassy in The Hague

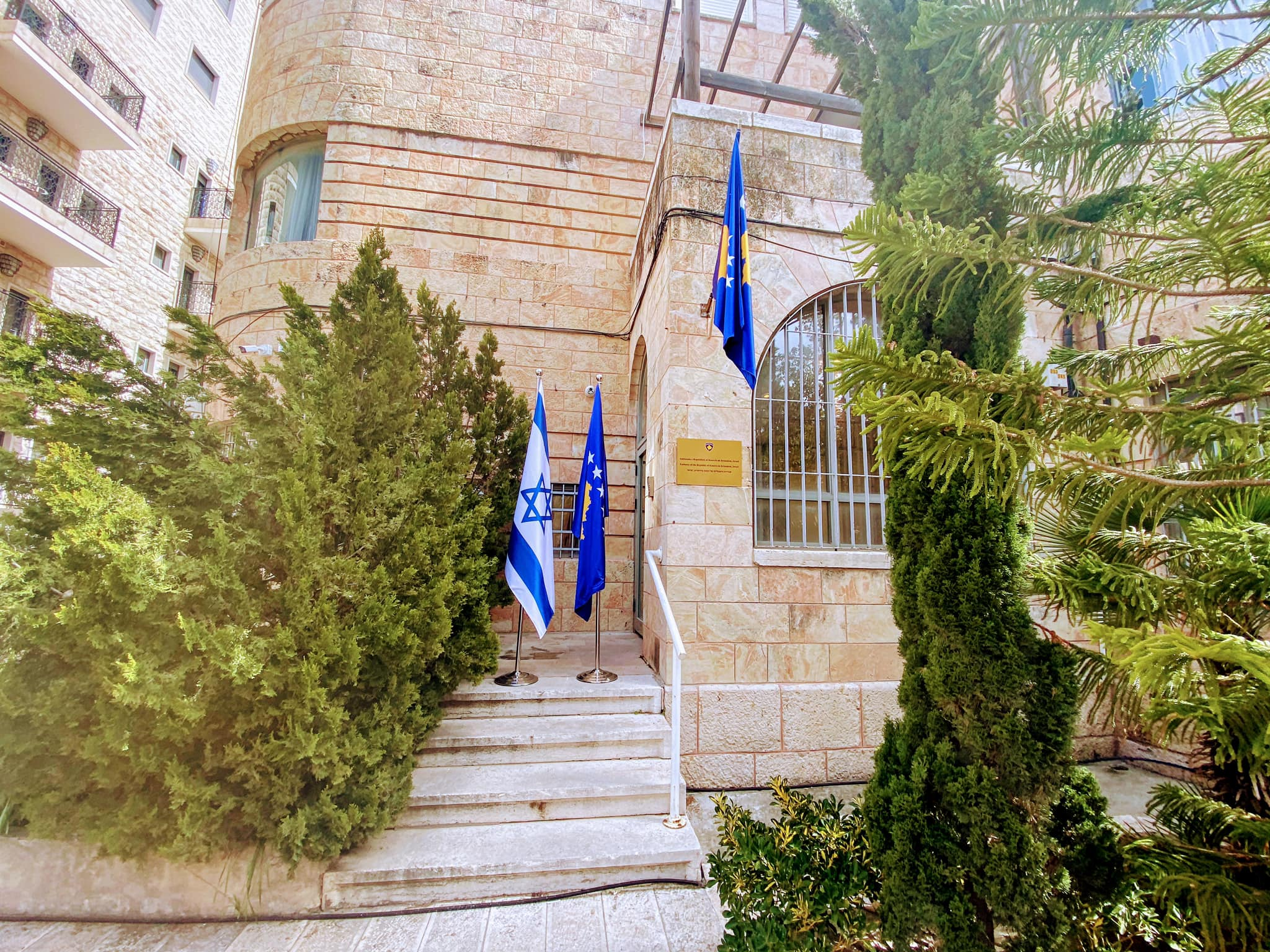
Embassy in Jerusalem

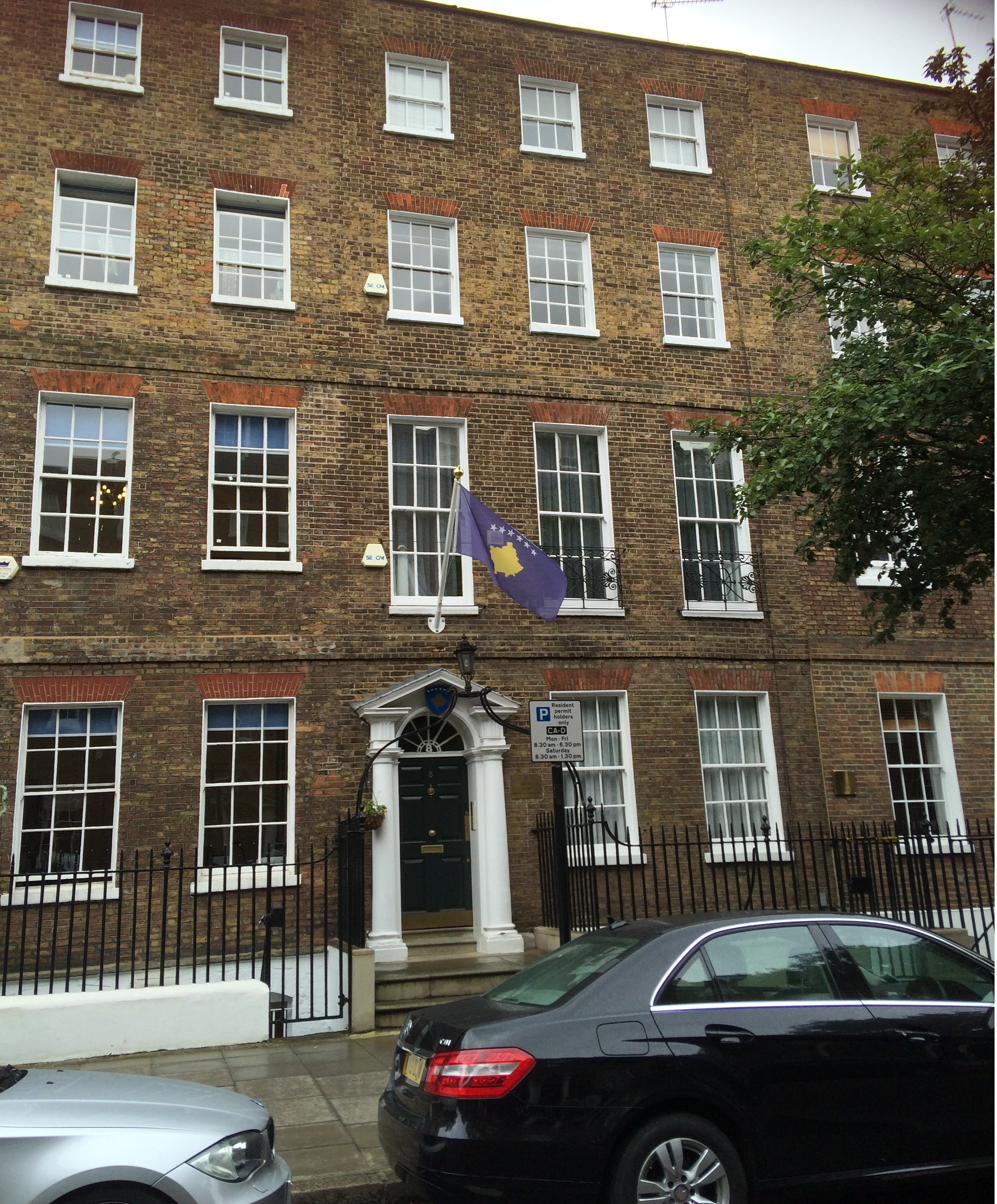
Embassy in London

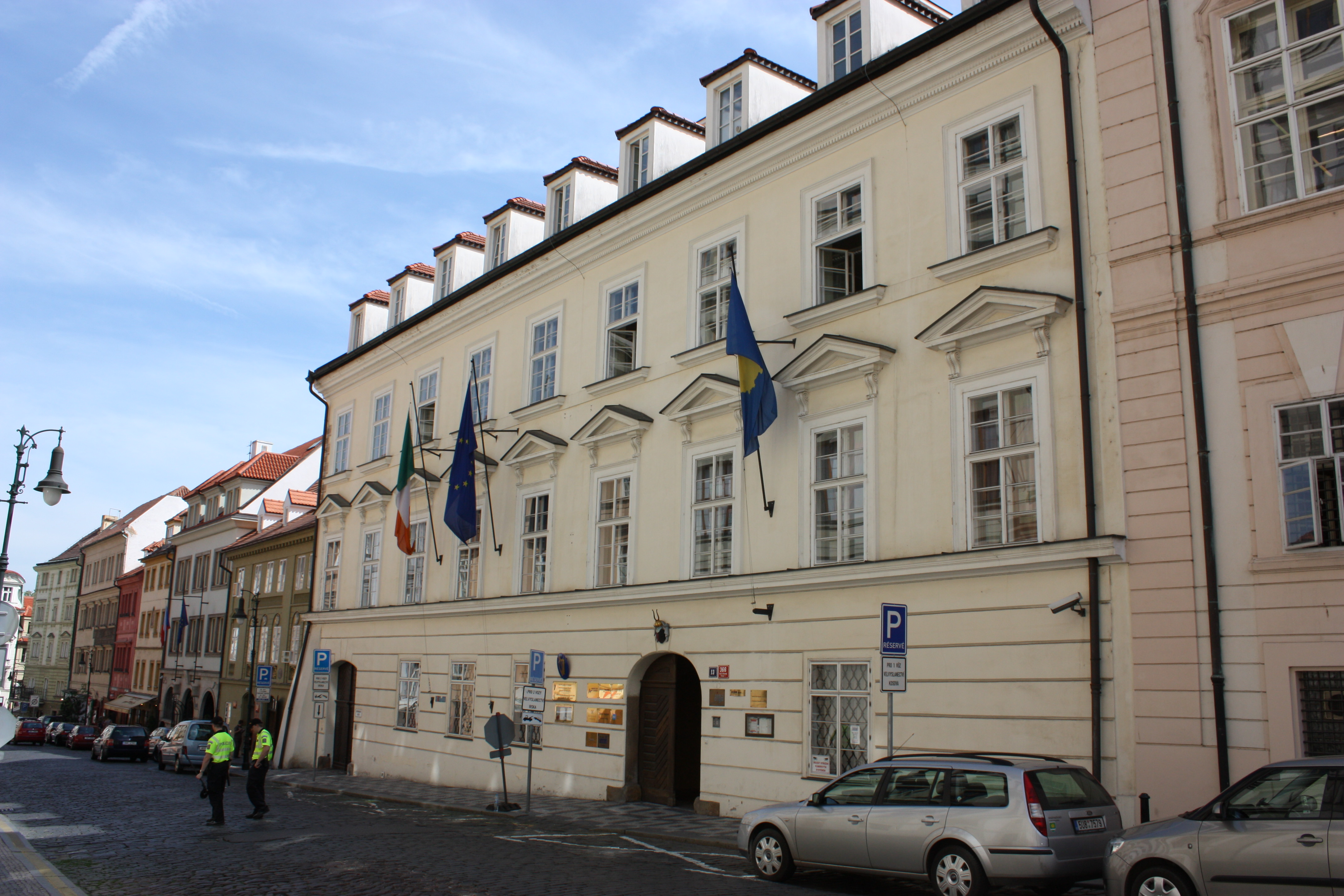
Embassy in Prague

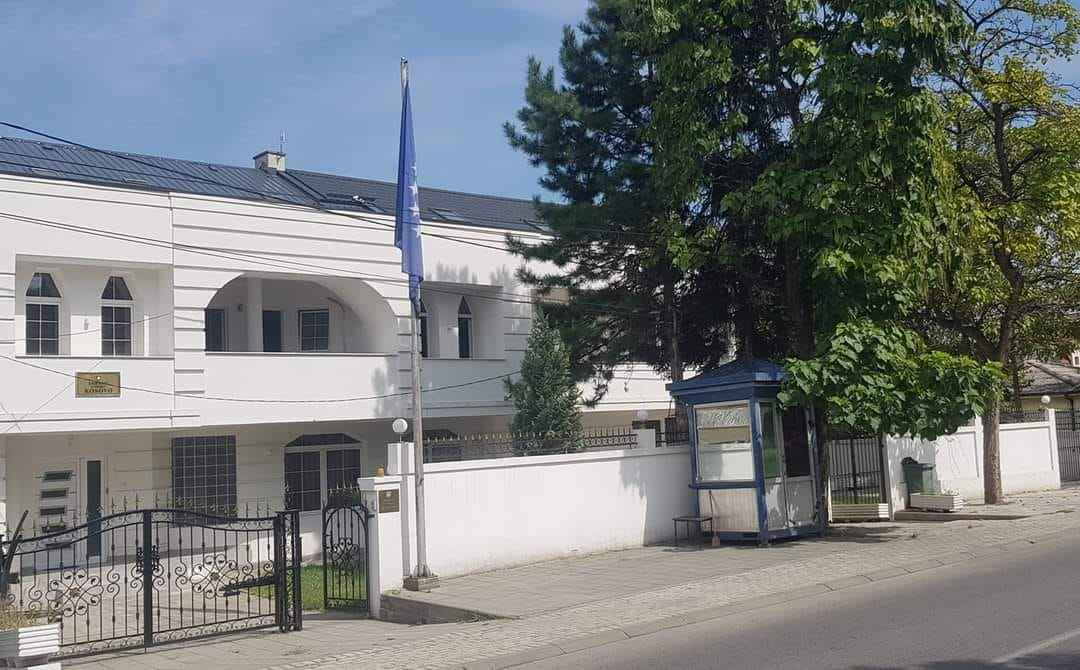
Embassy in Skopje

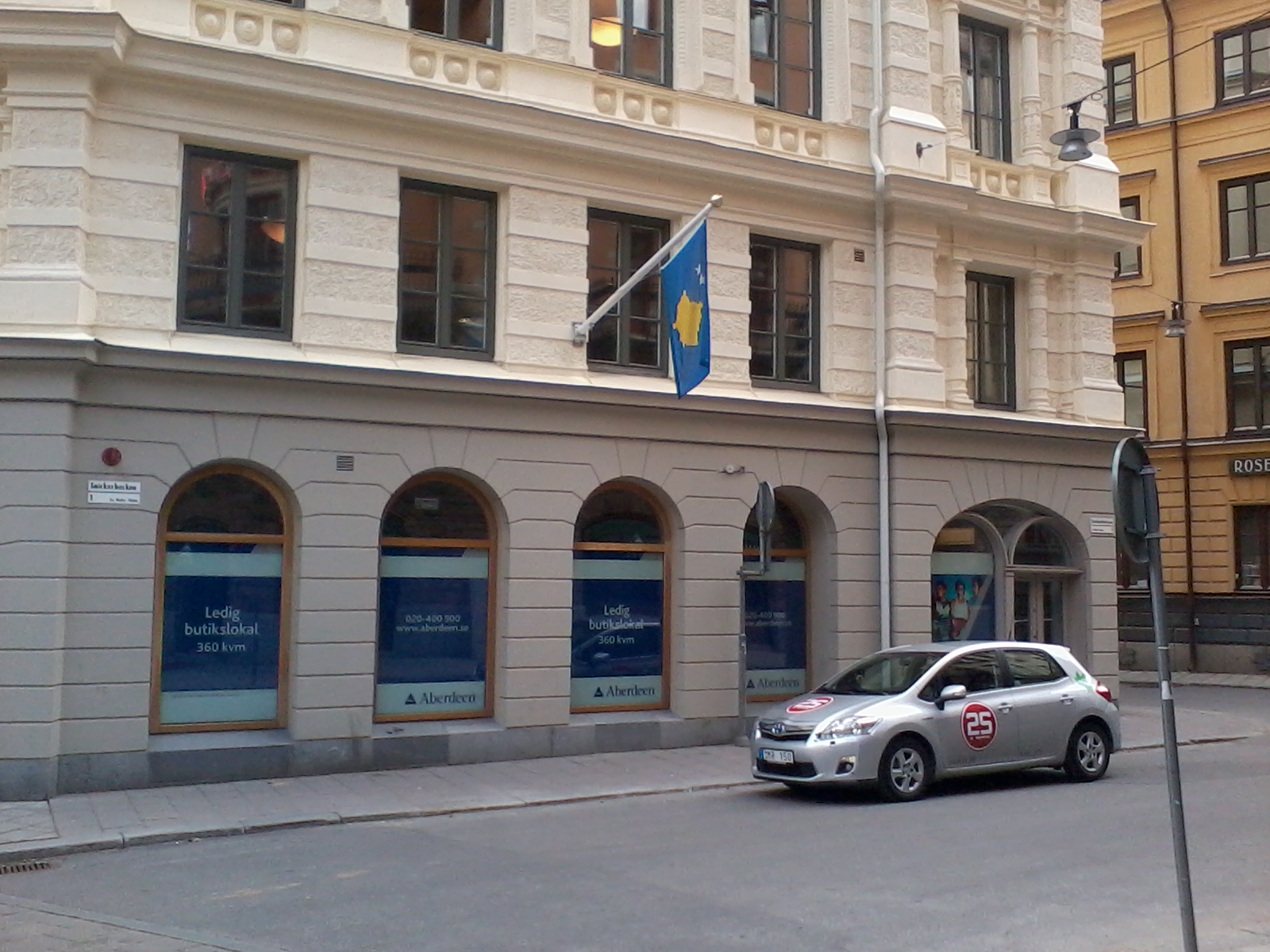
Embassy in Stockholm

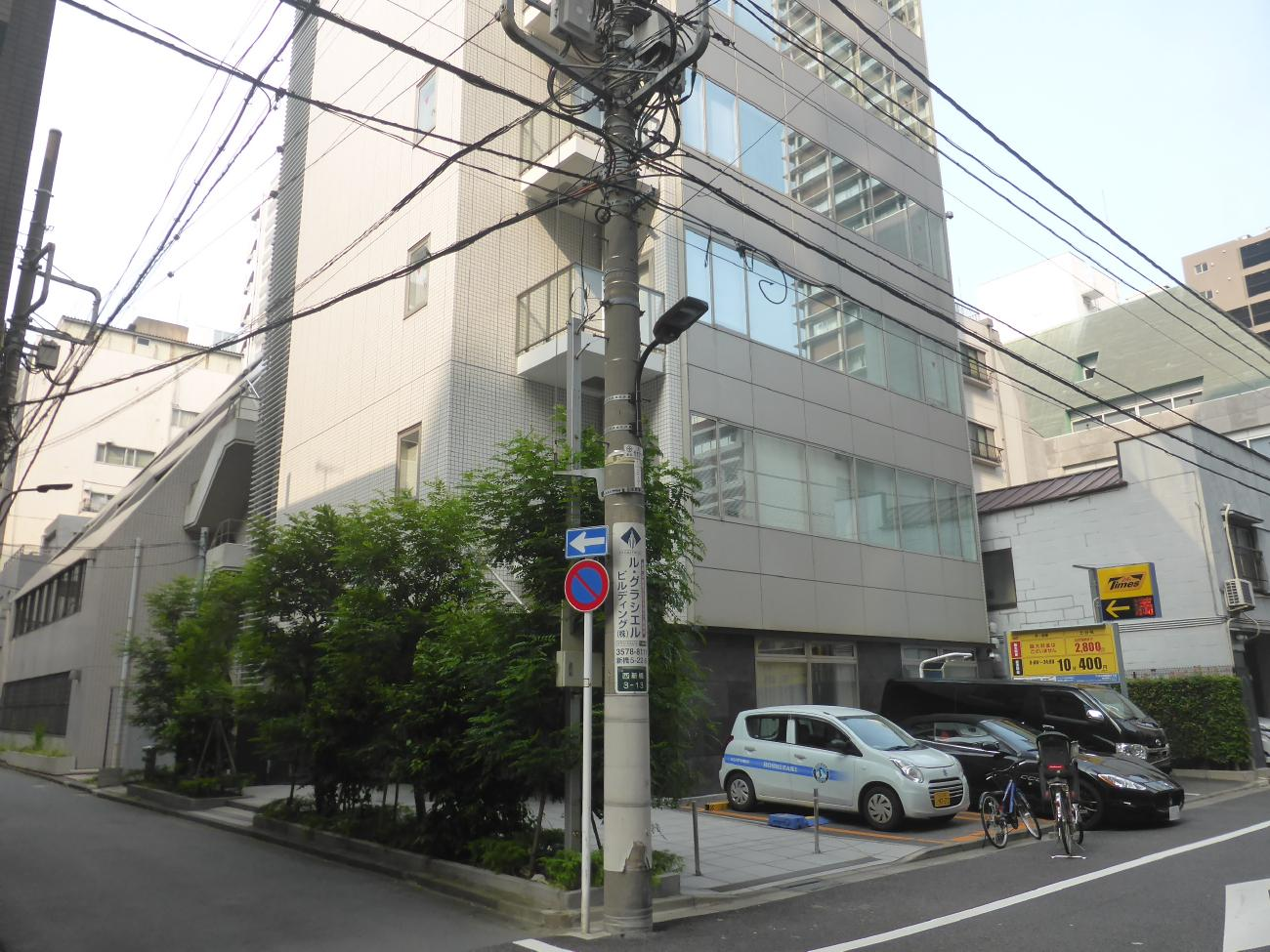
Embassy in Tokyo

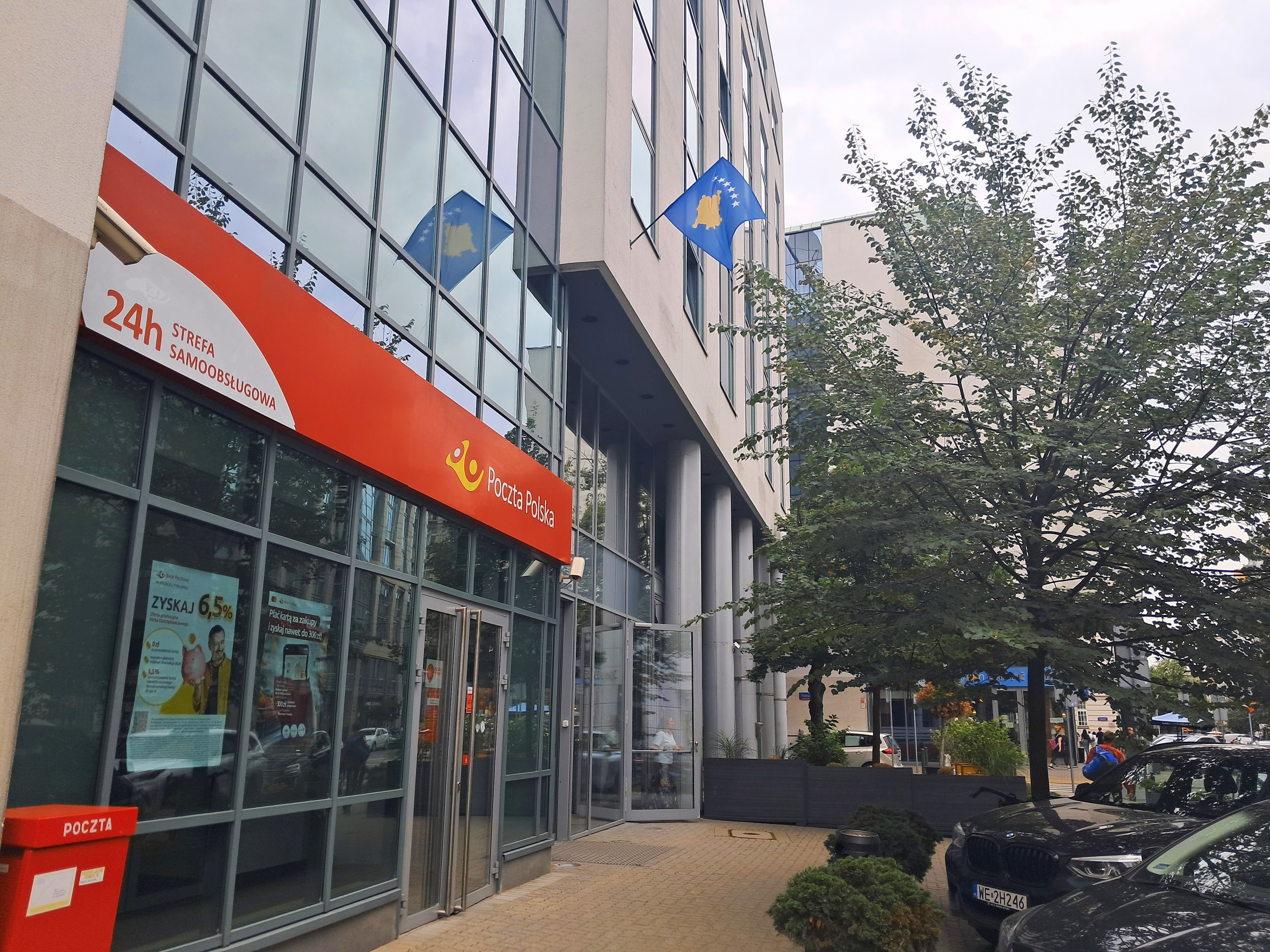
Consulate General in Warsaw

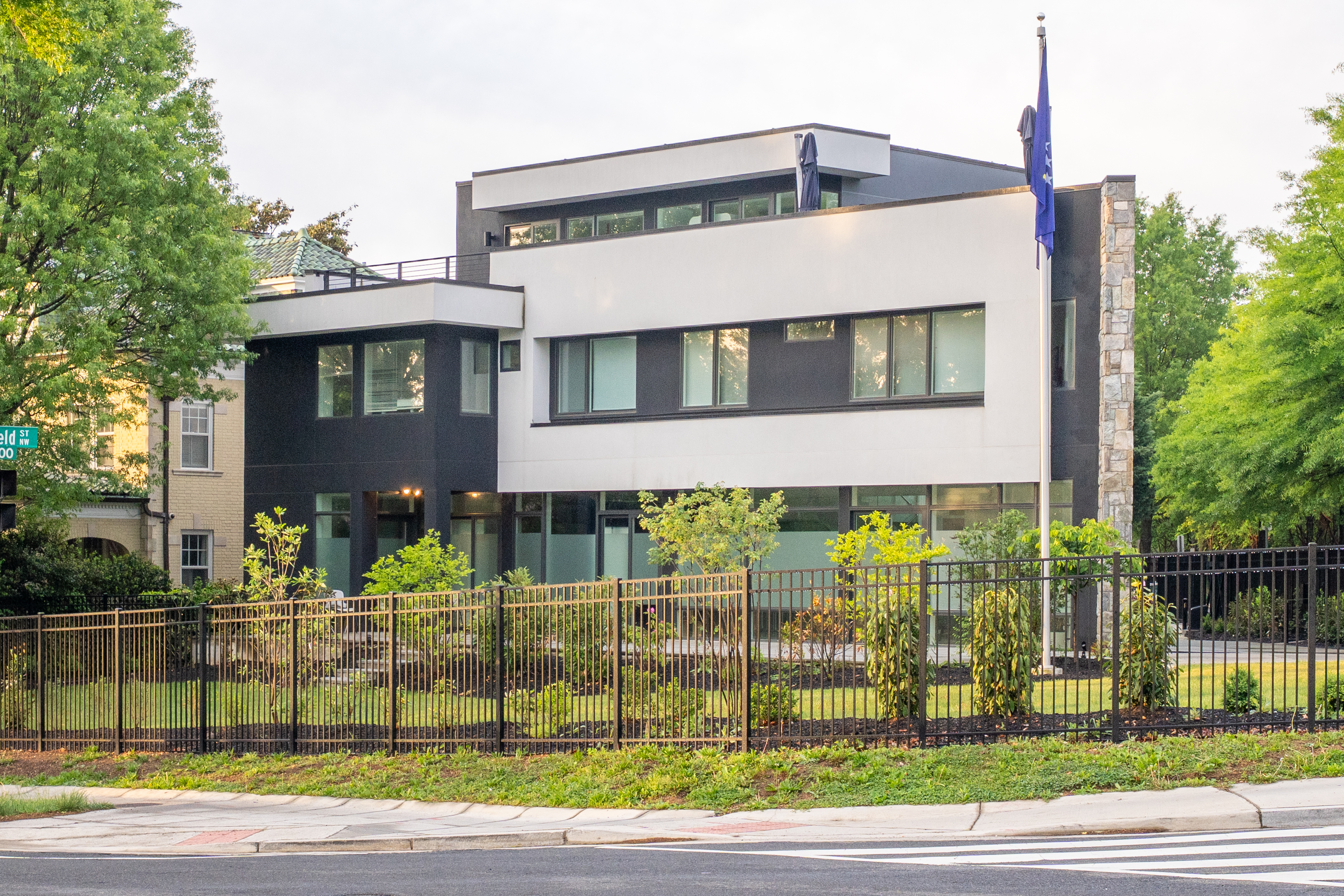
Embassy in Washington, D.C.

== Non-resident accredited embassies ==
- Andorra (Paris)
- Bahrain (Riyadh)
- Belize (Panama City)
- Chad (Dakar)
- Cook Islands (Canberra)
- Costa Rica (Panama City)
- Denmark (Berlin)
- Estonia (Brussels)
- Federated States of Micronesia (Tokyo)
- Fiji (Canberra)
- Finland (Stockholm)
- Guinea-Bissau (Dakar)
- Honduras (Panama City)
- Iceland (Stockholm)
- Ireland (London)
- Latvia (Stockholm)
- Liberia (Dakar)
- Libya (Rome)
- Liechtenstein (Bern)
- Lithuania (Stockholm)
- Luxembourg (Brussels)
- Maldives (Riyadh)
- Malta (Rome)
- Marshall Islands (Tokyo)
- Monaco (Paris)
- New Zealand (Canberra)
- Pakistan (Ankara)
- Palau (Tokyo)
- Saint Kitts and Nevis (Panama City)
- Saint Lucia (Panama City)
- Samoa (Canberra)
- San Marino (Rome)
- South Korea (Tokyo)
- Tonga (Canberra)
- Timor-Leste (Canberra)
- Tuvalu (Tokyo)
- Vanuatu (Canberra)

== See also ==
- List of diplomatic missions in Kosovo
- Foreign relations of Kosovo
