= Agron Bajrami =

Journalist

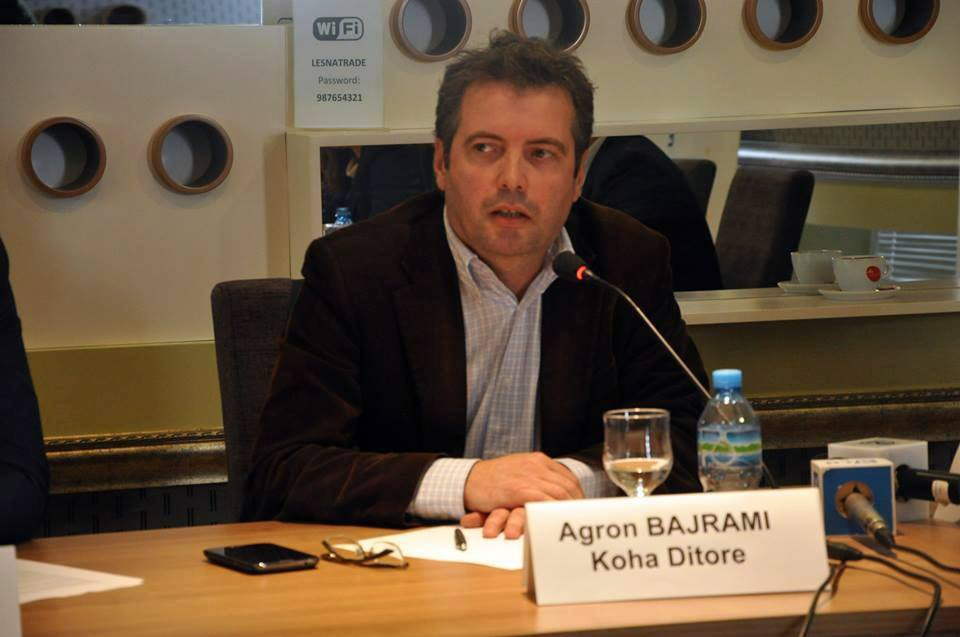
Agron Bajrami

Agron Bajrami (born 5 December 1967 in Pristina, Kosovo) is the editor of and a writer for Koha Ditore (English: Daily Time) newspaper, the largest daily newspaper in Kosovo. He filled various journalistic and editing positions at the newspaper since its establishment in 1997, and took over as editor in chief in September 2004 after its former editor and publisher, Veton Surroi, departed for politics. Bajrami is also a member of the board of South East Europe Media Organisation (SEEMO), head of the Kosovo Media Institute, and a regular columnist for Montenegrin daily newspaper Vijesti. Agron Bajrami has a degree in Fine Arts from the University of Pristina. He speaks several languages, including: Albanian, English, Serbian and German.
