= 2023 Ohrid Agreement =

Bilateral agreement between Kosovo and Serbia

Ohrid Agreement
Agreement on the path to normalisation between Kosovo and Serbia
- Context: Normalization of Kosovo–Serbia relations
- Drafted: 5 December 2022
- Signed: 18 March 2023 (signed by Republic of Kosovo, Serbia obligated verbally)
- Location: Ohrid, North Macedonia
- Mediators: European Union
- Signatories: Albin Kurti (Republic of Kosovo); Aleksandar Vučić (Serbia)
- Parties: Republic of Kosovo; Serbia
- Language: English

The Ohrid Agreement, officially known as Agreement on the path to normalisation between Kosovo and Serbia is an agreement mediated by the European Union that aims to normalize diplomatic relations between the Republic of Kosovo and Serbia. On 27 February 2023, it was verbally accepted by Kosovar prime minister Albin Kurti and Serbian president Aleksandar Vučić and a plan for its implementation was agreed on 18 March 2023.

== Background ==
In 2008, Albanians in Kosovo unilaterally declared independence from Serbia. The Republic of Kosovo and Serbia agreed in 2013 to a dialogue facilitated by the European Union (EU), and reaching an agreement with the Republic of Kosovo is a requirement for Serbia to join the EU.

== History ==
Initially known as the "Franco-German proposal", the agreement was drafted by French and German diplomats based in the region and was inspired by the "two-Germanies" model from the Cold War. On 5 December 2022, the European Union presented a draft proposal to both Kosovo and Serbia at the EU-Western Balkans summit in Tirana. On 27 February, 2023, Serbian President Aleksandar Vučić and Kosovar Prime Minister Albin Kurti met in Brussels to discuss an agreement, where they accepted the EU's draft. Josep Borrell, EU foreign policy chief , stated that no further discussion was needed regarding the plan itself, and future negotiations would be dedicated to its implementation. Kurti and Vučić met again on 18 March at Ohrid, North Macedonia, and verbally accepted a roadmap for implementing the agreement.

== Agreement ==
While the agreement does not explicitly require that Serbia recognise Kosovo as independent, it does prevent Serbia from opposing the accession of Kosovo to international organisations such as the Council of Europe, European Union or NATO, in addition to requiring Serbia to recognise Kosovar national symbols, passports, diplomas, and vehicle registration plates. Kosovo is required to ensure an appropriate level of self-management for its ethnic Serb community. The ultimate goal of the agreement is to create "a legally binding agreement on comprehensive normalization of [Kosovo–Serbia] relations". Within the text of the agreement, the name Kosovo is used without an asterisk and both parties are referred to by name, i.e. as Serbia and Kosovo, rather than as Belgrade and Pristina.

=== Provisions ===
The provisions of the agreement include:

- The two parties should develop normal, good-neighbourly relations.
- The parties will mutually recognise their respective documents and national symbols, including passports, diplomas, licence plates, and customs stamps.
- Both parties will respect each other's independence, autonomy and territorial integrity and the right of self-determination.
- The parties will settle any disputes between them exclusively by peaceful means and refrain from the threat or use of force.
- Neither of the two can represent the other in the international sphere.
- Serbia will not object to Kosovo's membership in any international organisation.
- Neither party will block, nor encourage others to block, the other party's progress in their respective EU path.
- The government of Kosovo will commit to ensure an appropriate level of self-management for the ethnic Serbian community in Kosovo.
- Kosovo will ensure the security of the properties of the Serbian Orthodox Church within its borders.
- Kosovo and Serbia will exchange permanent missions in each other's capitals.
- Both parties are to continue to implement previous agreements.

== Implementation ==
The annex concerning the implementation of the agreement was agreed by the leaders of Kosovo and Serbia on 18 March 2023. A European Union chaired Joint Monitoring Committee is to be formed within 30 days to monitor the implementation of the agreement. The European Union will amend Chapter 35 benchmarks for Serbia to reflect Serbia's new obligations from the agreement and annex. Kosovo's new obligations stemming from the agreement and annex will also be included in its EU accession process. Both parties accepted that failure to implement the provisions of the agreement will lead to negative consequences both in terms of aid from, and accession to, the European Union. Josep Borrell informed EU foreign ministers that the implementation of the agreement will be "supervised by a commission from both countries and the European Union which is legally binding".

At a European Council summit on 23 March 2023, Borrell warned the leaders of Serbia and Kosovo that "Any attempt to question the agreement is futile. This agreement was agreed. It has to be implemented. And there is no room for picking and choosing. We will closely monitor who implements it and who does not."

Representatives of Kosovo and Serbia met in Brussels on 4 April 2023 to further discuss implementation of the agreement. Issues discussed included self-management for the ethnic Serb community in Kosovo and mutual recognition of diplomas. The two parties also reached an agreement on missing persons. Afterward it was stated the next meeting between Kurti and Vučić might take place on 22 April, if Vučić was ready for such a meeting.

A Joint Monitoring Committee to oversee the implementation of the agreement was formed on 19 April 2023. The members of the committee are Miroslav Lajčák representing the EU, Agron Bajrami representing Kosovo and Petar Petković representing Serbia. The terms of reference for the committee are expected to be agreed on 2 May 2023 and it is expected to meet regularly in Brussels.

On 2 May 2023, Vučić and Kurti met in Brussels reached an agreement to "cooperate closely on the identification of grave sites and will ensure full access to reliable and accurate information that helps in locating and identifying missing persons from the time frame from 1 January 1998, to 31 December 2000." The two were unable to agree on the structure of a proposed self-management association for Kosovo's ethnic-Serb community.

A draft statute for an Association of Serb-Majority Municipalities in Kosovo was presented by EU leaders on 26 October 2023, and the leaders of Kosovo and Serbia expressed their readiness to implement their commitments. EU leaders urged Kosovo to quickly adopt the draft statute and form an Association of Serb-Majority Municipalities and for Serbia to deliver on the de-facto recognition of Kosovo's independence.

On 25 December 2023, the government of Serbia announced it would recognise the validity of vehicle licence plates issued by the Republic of Kosovo from 1 January 2024 onwards and would no longer require vehicles bearing these plates to cover up Kosovo's national symbols or the country code "RKS". Serbia was obliged to do so under the terms of both the 2011 Brussels agreement and 2023 Ohrid agreement. The following day, Kosovo's prime minister Albin Kurti stated that his country would follow suit once the Kosovo Police verifies Serbia implementation of its commitments. Kurti confirmed that vehicles bearing Serbian licence plates may enter Kosovo without placing stickers over national symbols on 4 January 2024.

On 20 March 2024, the government of Kosovo returned 24 hectares of contested land to the Visoki Dečani monastery of the Serbian Orthodox Church as directed by the Constitutional Court of Kosovo, ending an eight-year dispute.

In April 2024, the European Union amended Chapter 35 of the ascension benchmarks for Serbia to incorporate its obligations under the Ohrid Agreement and to establish a mechanism for monitoring the implementation of agreements reached within the Belgrade-Pristina dialogue. As a result, failure to adhere to obligations contained within the Ohrid Agreement, such as opposing Kosovo's membership in international organisations, could halt Serbia's accession to the European Union.

On 15 May 2024, Kosovo's foreign minister Donika Gërvalla-Schwarz announced that the government of Kosovo will prepare draft legislation for the establishment of a community of Serb-majority municipalities and submit it to the Constitutional Court of Kosovo for an opinion regarding its constitutionality by the end of May 2024.

=== Violations ===
==== Kosovo ====
As of April 2025, Kosovo is yet to formally establish an Association of Serb-Majority Municipalities, however draft legislation was announced in May 2024.

==== Serbia ====
On 24 April 2023, Serbia violated the terms of the agreement, specifically article four, by voting against Kosovo's membership of the Council of Europe. Despite Serbia's opposition, Kosovo's application passed the 2/3 threshold required in the Committee of Ministers and was referred to the Parliamentary Assembly for its consideration. Following the vote, Serbian President Vučić lashed out at Western powers, telling them to not "lie and cheat" and "interpret things as they see fit, not as written or agreed upon", and the foreign minister, Ivica Dačić, described the events as a "day of shame for the Council of Europe". Serbia also threatened to no longer respect the territorial integrity of countries that voted in favour of Kosovo's membership or that abstained, mentioning Montenegro, which voted in favour, and Ukraine and Bosnia and Herzegovina, which abstained, specifically. A spokesperson for European Union stated that it "took note" of Serbia's vote against Kosovo's membership of the Council of Europe, but added that "The agreement is alive because it's being taken forward".

Serbia again violated article four of agreement on 27 March when it voted against Kosovo's membership of the Council of Europe in the Committee on Political Affairs and Democracy of the Parliamentary Assembly of the Council of Europe. The committee agreed to advance Kosovo's application by 31 votes in favour, three against and one abstention.

Serbia further violated article four on 16 April 2024, when its delegates to the Parliamentary Assembly of the Council of Europe voted against Kosovo's membership of that organization, spoke out against Kosovo's membership and encouraged other countries to vote against Kosovo's membership. Serbian delegates also threatened to quit the organization if Kosovo were admitted as a member state and personally attacked rapporteur Dora Bakoyannis. Previously, Serbian president Alexander Vučić had referred to Bakoyannis as a "shameful woman" for recommending Kosovo's membership in her draft opinion to the assembly. The assembly resolved to recommend that the Committee of Ministers invites Kosovo to become a member state of the Council of Europe with 131 votes in favour, 29 against and 11 abstentions.

== Reactions ==
=== Kosovo ===
On 18 March 2023, Kosovar prime minister Albin Kurti stated that by accepting the terms of the agreement Serbia had de facto recognised Kosovo as a state on 27 February 2023. He also added that in the absence of Vučić physically signing the document, the European Union should ensure it remains legally and internationally binding on the parties. On 20 March 2023, Kurti said during a meeting with foreign diplomats in Pristina, that as a result of the agreement, the road for Kosovo to join the Council of Europe is now open. On 23 March 2023, Kurti told the Assembly of Kosovo that he had received guarantees from the EU and the US on the implementation of the agreement and called the agreement a "powerful weapon" which should be used in the best way for Kosovo. He also restated his commitment to implementing the agreement saying "If we want to be treated as a state and be recognised as such, I cannot avoid the obligations from the international treaties that we have agreed."

=== Serbia ===
After he signalled his acceptance of the text of the main agreement at the high-level meeting in Brussels on 27 February 2023, Serbian president Aleksandar Vučić appeared to change his position in a TV interview the following evening saying that "there is no agreement" and that "I will not let Kosovo into the UN" after he was accused by far-right and nationalist parties of betraying national interests. After the meeting in Ohrid on 18 March 2023, Vučić stated on live TV the following day that he will work on implementing the agreement so long as he is not required to de jure recognise the independence of Kosovo or support its membership of the United Nations which he described as red lines. He also stated that he would not sign any deal now or in the next four years, because his arm hurt, saying: "I have excruciating pain in my right hand, I can only sign with my right hand and that pain is expected to continue for the next four years". Supporters of far-right and nationalist parties protested against the agreement and blocked roads in Belgrade on 24 March. Many demanded Vučić's resignation, and wore t-shirts displaying the pro-Russian "Z" symbol associated with Russia's invasion of Ukraine.

=== Organisations ===
- In considering Kosovo's application for membership of the Council of Europe, its Committee of Ministers cited the Ohrid Agreement and stressed the importance of all parties implementing it in good faith.
- European Union High Representative for external affairs Josep Borrell described the agreement as a "significant achievement". European Council president Charles Michel congratulated the parties on reaching an agreement, and stated that implementation is key to peace, stability and prosperity in the Western Balkans. The European Council welcomed the agreement on 23 March 2023 and urged all parties to implement their obligations in good faith.
- A spokesperson for NATO welcomed the agreement and urged both parties implement what was agreed as quickly as possible.
- OSCE Secretary General Helga Schmid described the agreement as "great news" and stated that the OSCE "looks forward to early progress with implementation and stands ready to support in its mandated areas". OSCE chairman in office Bujar Osmani also congratulated both parties on reaching an agreement.

=== Countries ===
- Albanian Prime Minister Edi Rama welcomed that both Kosovo and Serbia had consented to the terms of the agreement. Rama also hopes that the agreement will lead to an improvement in relations between Serbia and Albania.
- (France) French President Emmanuel Macron has expressed support for the agreement. The French government strongly encouraged both parties act responsibly and implement their obligations under the agreement. French diplomats warned that there would be consequences if the terms of the agreement are not implemented.
- (Germany) German Chancellor Olaf Scholz welcomed the agreement on 7 March 2023, and said he expected constructive results soon.
- (Republic of Ireland) Irish foreign ministry described the agreement as an important step and added that implementation is now key.
- North Macedonia's foreign minister Bujar Osmani congratulated both parties on reaching an agreement.
- The foreign ministry of Norway congratulated Kosovo, Serbia and the EU on reaching an agreement.
- The foreign minister of Slovenia stated "I can say we had more ambitious expectations from all sides, but now at least we have a base, the implementation will be important.
- Sweden's ambassador in Kosovo welcomed the agreement.
- The government of Switzerland welcomed the agreement and stated that it is committed to supporting its implementation.
- Turkey welcomed the agreement and hopes the parties will comply with its terms.
- The United Arab Emirates welcomed the agreement.
- (United Kingdom) British diplomats in Belgrade and Pristina welcomed the agreement and commended the brave steps taken by the leaders of Kosovo and Serbia in reaching it and urged both sides to move quickly to make its provisions a reality.
- The agreement was welcomed by the United States which urged both parties to immediately begin its implementation. The United States Special Envoy for the Western Balkans, Gabriel Escobar, stated that the US considers the agreement to be legally binding on the parties.

== See also ==
- Kosovo–Serbia relations
- Accession of Kosovo to the European Union
- Accession of Serbia to the European Union
- 2013 Brussels Agreement
- Kosovo and Serbia economic normalization agreements
