= 2000 unrest in Kosovo =

- Part of the aftermath of the Kosovo War
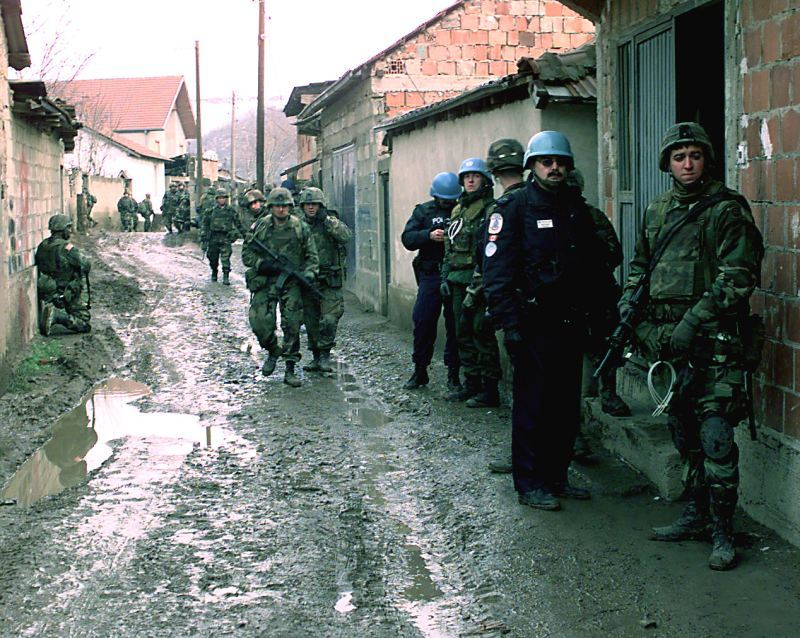
- US Army and Canadian UNMIK personnel searching houses for weapons in Mitrovica, February 21, 2000
Date	February 16, 2000 – June 6, 2000
Location	UN-administered Kosovo

Belligerents
Kosovar Albanians	Kosovar Serbs	KFOR (United Nations) UNMIK

Strength
1,700	Unknown	45,000 soldiers (United Nations) 26 UNMIK Police

Casualties and losses
7 killed	17 killed 23 injured	(Russia) 1 Russian peacekeeper (France) 19 French soldiers injured (United Nations) UNMIK vehicles burned

The 2000 unrest in Kosovo (Serbian: Немири на Косову 2000., romanized: Nemiri na Kosovu 2000.; Albanian: Trazirat e vitit 2000 në Kosovë) was the result of the United Nations Interim Administration adopting Resolution 1244 on 10 June 1999. The unrest was fought between the Kosovo Force (KFOR), Kosovar Albanians, and Kosovar Serbs. It lasted somewhere from 16 February 2000 – 6 June 2000. An unknown number of Kosovar Albanians and Kosovar Serbs died along with an unknown number injured, while one Russian KFOR soldier died from shot wounds and UNMIK vehicles were burned during the unrest.

== Background ==
United Nations Security Council Resolution 1244 was determined to resolve the serious humanitarian situation and ensure that all refugees could safely return. It condemned violence against the civilian population as well as acts of terrorism, and recalled the jurisdiction and mandate of the International Criminal Tribunal for the former Yugoslavia (ICTY). It also recalled the sovereignty and territorial integrity of the Federal Republic of Yugoslavia (FRY), at the same time calling for autonomy for Kosovo.

The resolution authorized an international civil and security presence in Kosovo and in the Federal Republic of Yugoslavia (FRY). The resolution also affirmed the need for immediate deployment of international civil and security presences, and authorized the establishment of the Kosovo Force.

The resolution established the United Nations Interim Administration Mission in Kosovo (UNMIK). The responsibilities of the international security presence included deterring new hostilities, monitoring the withdrawal of the Yugoslav Army, demilitarization of the Kosovo Liberation Army (KLA), and ensuring a safe environment in which refugees could return.

Mitrovicë became de facto partitioned, with the institutions of the Serb-inhabited north part of the town and North Kosovo more broadly being funded directly by Serbia. UN Special Representative Bernard Kouchner said of the division: "You have to think of the Serb reaction. The only place they feel protected is in the north—that's simply the fact". Violent riots in October 1999 by Albanians led to 184 injured and 1 death after Serb resistance to an attempt in September to escort Albanians over the Ibar bridge. The UNMIK accepted the KLA's transformation into a civilian emergency service organization numbering 5,000 personnel, the Kosovo Protection Corps (KPC), in September 1999.

== Events ==
The Ibar river bridge which divided the town became the site of violent clashes between the KFOR, Albanians and Serbs. A Yugoslav police officer and physician were killed, and three officers and a physician were wounded in February in Kosovska Mitrovica. A UN bus transporting Serb refugees in Mitrovica was hit by an anti-tank missile, and a grenade was thrown into a Serb café the same month. The Serbs rioted, which resulted in eight people were killed, including 7 Albanians in one incident, as reported on February 5. UNMIK vehicles were burned, and some French KFOR soldiers injured.

Between 2-20 February, some 1,700 Albanians, Turks and Bosniaks fled North Mitrovica. On February 16, Albanians attacked a bus convoy killing 12 Serbs. A prominent Serb medical doctor was murdered in Gnjilane on 26 February. A Russian KFOR soldier died from shot wounds sustained in Srbica on 29 February. Following the February unrest, the KFOR increased its numbers, which up until then was 30,000. Violence continued, however, and UNMIK and KFOR were criticised for failing to protect Serbs.

Meanwhile, the KFOR saw the Liberation Army of Preševo, Medveđa and Bujanovac (UÇPMB), an Albanian militant separatist organization in the Preševo Valley, training in the Ground Safety Zone (GSZ). Some KLA veterans were part of the UÇPMB. The UÇPMB attacked local police, intending to cede Albanian-inhabited areas to Kosovo. The European Union (EU) condemned what it described as the "extremism" and use of "illegal terrorist actions" by the group.

On 8 March, the FRY complained about the escalation of violence in the region, evidence that according to them, supported that the KLA was still active. On 15 March another FRY complaint protested KFOR establishment of an extended security zone in North Mitrovica, during which 16 Serb civilians were injured by stun grenades and tear gas. The FRY saw KFOR's actions as supporting the Albanians, pressuring Serbs to move out of Kosovo, and expected that they ensure minimum security and normal living in Mitrovica, "the last Serb refugee in Kosovo and Metohija".

The French KFOR was met with controversy, their risk-averting measures being called "cowardice", straining relations with other KFOR troops and the UNMIK; Danish soldiers complained and UN police felt abandoned. An example of French inaction was an event in June 2000, when a Serbian mob trapped a small group of Albanians and American police officers, then attacked an American colleague trying to reach them, 10 meters from a French checkpoint. The French troops were withdrawing to their vehicles during the incident. Between April and September 2000 the FRY issued several documents to the UN Security Council about violence against Serbs and other non-Albanians. On 6 June, a grenade was thrown at a crowd of ethnic Serbs waiting for a bus in the town square of Gračanica, injuring three people, which was followed by some civil unrest.

UNMIK crime statistics on evictions, intimidation and arson in Albanian-majority Pristina and Gnjilane in 2000 are consistent with a strategy of forced expulsion of ethnic Serbs and other non-Albanian minorities.

== Aftermath ==
On 22 January 2001, a group of armed Albanians attacked a police station in northern Macedonia near the border with Kosovo, killing a police officer and injuring three others, thereby starting the insurgency in the Republic of Macedonia. The insurgent NLA was organized from former KLA fighters from Kosovo and Macedonia, UCPMB fighters, young Albanian radicals and nationalists from Macedonia, and foreign mercenaries.

In February 2001, enraged Albanian mobs routed French troops and torched KFOR armoured vehicles after an Albanian child had been killed in northern Mitrovica, believing it was a provocation by the Serbs. The victim was a 15-year-old boy who was killed in a grenade attack, which amidst Serb refusal to allow the return of Albanians in North Mitrovica sparked several days of riots. On 16 February 2001 a Serb convoy escorted by KFOR was attacked in a remote-controlled bomb explosion near Podujevo, leaving 12 dead and 40 wounded. A bomb attack in April 2001 targeting Serbs in Pristina left one dead and four injured (KLA volunteer Roland Bartetzko was later found guilty).

On 8 April 2002, local Serbs attacked and injured 26 UNMIK police setting up a checkpoint in North Mitrovica. The UNMIK established its administration in northern Mitrovica on 25 November 2002.

Although crime rates decreased in 2003, violence and crimes against minorities were concerning. On 12 April 2003 a bomb exploded on a railway bridge in Northern Kosovo, killing two, including the planter, a KPC officer; an Albanian extremist organization took responsibility. On 17 April the Special Representative defined the group as terrorist. On 19 May a Kosovo Serb politician from Klokot was murdered and two elderly Serbs assaulted. On 4 June three Kosovo Serbs were murdered in Obilić. In August 2003, explosive devices planted in the Serb enclave of Klokot destroyed five Serb houses, with several injuries, including two American KFOR soldiers. On 13 August two Serb youths were killed and four wounded in a shooting in Goraždevac.

On 18 August a Serb male died from wounds sustained from a shooting on 11 August, and another was seriously wounded in a shooting in a returnee site near Klina. On 31 August, four Serbs were injured and one killed in an explosion attack in Cernica near Gnjilane. The violent incidents further heightened the feeling of insecurity in the Serb minority, while UNMIK police took security measures in minority areas. Crime against UNMIK increased, with a police officer killed in the north by sniper on 3 August, while a KPS officer was murdered near Djakovica on 6 September, and another KPS officer was shot at in Pristina on 10 September. The violence level increased steadily since late 2003. On 17 March 2004, a violent unrest broke out in Kosovo.
