= Laplje Selo =

Village in Kosovo

Laplje Selo: Лапље Село/Laplje Selo (Serbian); Llapllasellë (Albanian)
- Village
- Location within Kosovo
- Country: Kosovo
- District: Prishtina
- Municipality: Graçanicë

Population (2024)
  - Total: 1,387
- Time zone: UTC+1 (CET)
  - Summer (DST): UTC+2 (CEST)

Laplje Selo (Serbian Cyrillic: Лапље Село, Albanian: Llapllaselle) is a village in the Gračanica municipality of Kosovo. Llapllasella was part of the Pristina municipality before the Gračanica municipality was created.

It is a Serb enclave situated south of Čaglavica, and has a supermajority of ethnic Serbs. During the Kosovo War, Serbs were displaced, after more than a decade, sixteen families returned to their village, on February 6, 2010. That number has since increased to just over 20 families.

Various problems, some of them related to anti-Serb sentiment, persist for returnees. There is no running water, and harassment takes place, such as cemetery desecration.

Historical population of Lapnasella
Year	Pop.	±% p.a.
1948	853	—
1953	932	+1.79%
1961	1,043	+1.42%
1971	1,072	+0.27%
1981	1,209	+1.21%
1991	1,383	+1.35%
2011	892	−2.17%
2024	1,387	+3.45%
Source: Kosovo Agency of Statistics
