= Podujevo bus bombing =

Bombing attack committed by suspected Albanian extremists in 2001

Coordinates: 42°55′N 21°12′E

- Location: Near Podujevë, United Nations Administered Kosovo
- Date: 16 February 2001; 12:00 p.m. (Central European Time)
- Target: Serbs
- Attack type: Bombing
- Deaths: 12
- Injuries: 40

The Podujevo bus bombing was an attack on a bus carrying Serb civilians near the town of Podujevë in Kosovo on 16 February 2001. The bombing killed twelve Serb civilians who were travelling to Gračanica and injured dozens more. Albanian extremists are suspected of being responsible for the attack. Gračanica is a predominantly Serb-populated town in central Kosovo, near the regional capital Pristina, in a predominantly Albanian-populated area. Following the Kosovo War in 1999 it became an enclave within Albanian-controlled territory. Relations between the two communities were tense and occasionally violent.

== Background ==
In 1992–1993, ethnic Albanians created the Kosovo Liberation Army (KLA) which started attacking police forces and secret-service officials who abused Albanian civilians in 1995. Starting in 1998, the KLA was involved in frontal battle, with increasing numbers of Yugoslav security forces. Escalating tensions led to the Kosovo War in February 1998.

The failure of the talks at Rambouillet resulted in a NATO air campaign against the Federal Republic of Yugoslavia lasting from 24 March to 10 June when the Yugoslav authorities signed a military technical agreement. NATO-led international peacekeepers established the Kosovo Force (KFOR) with 50,000 NATO troops. An international civilian mission was established by the name of the United Nations Interim Administration Mission (UNMIK), which entered Kosovo on 11 June 1999.

The 848,000 Albanians who were displaced from their homes during the war quickly returned as about 230,000 Serbs, Roma and other non-Albanians were forcibly cleansed from Kosovo or fled it in fear of retaliatory attacks. At least an estimated 1,000 Serbs were killed by Kosovo Albanians in attacks following the war.

Approximately 100 Serbian Orthodox churches and monasteries were damaged or destroyed in the region by the end of 1999. KLA officials condemned some of the attacks while Albanian media organizations attempted to justify them, calling the churches "symbols of Serbian fascism." Serbian authorities urged international forces to prevent further attacks from occurring.

There was widespread unrest in Kosovo during 2000. On 6 June, a grenade was thrown at a crowd of ethnic Serbs waiting for a bus in the town square of Gračanica, injuring three people, which was followed by some civil unrest. On 22 January 2001, an insurgency was carried out in the Republic of Macedonia by the ethnic Albanian National Liberation Army, established from former KLA fighters from Kosovo, Albanian insurgents from the Liberation Army of Preševo, Medveđa and Bujanovac (UÇPMB) in Serbia, young Albanian radicals, nationalists from Macedonia, and foreign mercenaries.

== Attack ==
Niš Express has a convoy of five or seven buses which carried 200 ethnic Serbs from Kosovo to the southeastern Serbian city of Niš and back. The convoy was under the protection of a British unit of KFOR and was escorted by five Swedish armoured vehicles. A remote-controlled bomb exploded in its vicinity at noon on 16 February 2001 as it passed through the Albanian-populated town of Podujevë while returning from Niš to the Serbian enclave in Gračanica. The Serbs were travelling to visit family graves in Gračanica on the Orthodox Christian Day of the Dead. The first bus took the full force of the blast. It contained 57 passengers and most of those killed or wounded in the attack were sitting in it. KFOR had received advance warning of the attack and conducted a thorough search of the bus route but did not uncover any explosive devices. The youngest victim was Danilo Cokic (1999–2001). The explosion caused many injuries and United Nations helicopters were used to airlift at least three victims to hospital. The buses not affected by the blast were able to drive away from the scene. The two men who were spotted by the KFOR patrol before the attack were taken into custody.

== Aftermath ==
Kosovo Albanian extremists were suspected of orchestrating the attack. Initial reports suggested that 7 people were killed by the blast. Two wounded Serbs died en route to the hospital and the body parts of two others were found amongst the debris of the bus. 12 people total were killed and 40 more were injured by the blast. According to KFOR's regional commander, the bomb was made of 100–200 pounds of high explosive. The explosion created a crater that was six feet (1.8 m) deep and twelve feet (3.6 m) wide.

Serbs living in Kosovo enclaves began forming crowds and attacking Albanians within one hour of the attack. Serbs in the enclave of Čaglavica blocked the road leading to Macedonia and pulled ethnic Albanians out of their cars and assaulted them. The relatives of the victims reacted by staging violent protests in Gračanica.

NATO leaders condemned the blast and called it "premeditated murder." NATO peacekeepers on the ground described the bombing as an indiscriminate attack. NATO Secretary General George Robertson responded to the blast by saying "NATO did not conduct its air campaign in order to see ethnic cleansing by one group replaced by the ethnic attacks and intimidation of another". He warned that Kosovo was in danger of losing the support of the international community if violence continued. The Parliament of Serbia and Montenegro protested the bombing—which it deemed an act of terrorism—by cutting short its session.

A bomb attack in April 2001 targeting Serbs in Pristina left one dead and four injured. KLA volunteer Roland Bartetzko was later charged with murder, attempted murder and terrorism. The following year, he was convicted on all counts by an international court under the supervision of the UNMIK, and sentenced to 23 years' imprisonment. Bartetzko's sentence was later commuted to 20 years' imprisonment. He was released on parole in 2015.

=== Arrests ===
Controversy surrounds the arrests and subsequent release of the suspects. Five Albanian men were arrested for the attack. Four men were later suspected of committing the attack, but they escaped from a U.S. detention facility in 2002. One Albanian, Florim Ejupi, was convicted in 2008 of planting the bomb and sentenced to 40 years in prison. However, he was released on 13 March 2009. On 5 June 2009, EULEX's chief prosecutor announced that the EU mission had opened a new inquest into the case that had been given to the special prosecutor's office in charge of war crimes cases.
