= Gračanica, Kosovo =

Gračanica: Graçanica or Graçanicë (Albanian) Gračanica or Грачаница (Serbian)
- Town and municipality
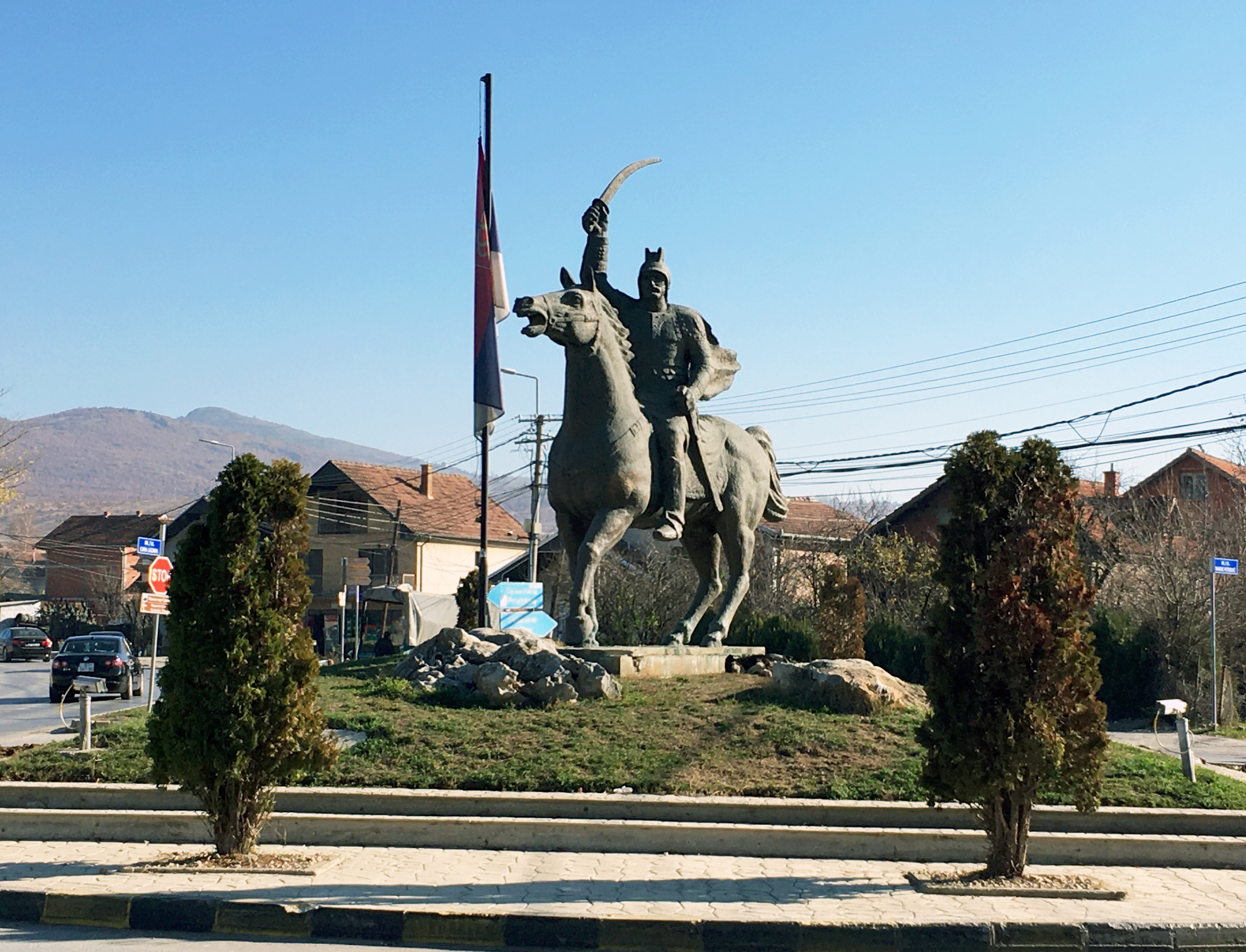
- Center of Gračanica

- Flag Emblem

- Interactive map of Gračanica
- Coordinates: 42°36′N 21°12′E
- Country: Kosovo
- District: District of Pristina
- Settlements: 16
- Established: 29 December 2009

Government
  - Mayor: Novak Zivic (SL)

Area
  - Total: 131.25 km^{2} (50.68 sq mi)
- Elevation: 588 m (1,929 ft)

Population (2024)
  - Total: 19,371
  - Density: 147.59/km^{2} (382.25/sq mi)
- Time zone: UTC+1 (CET)
- Postal code: 10500
- Area code: +383(0)38
- Vehicle registration: 01
- Website: Official site

Gračanica (Serbian Cyrillic: Грачаница) or Graçanicë (Albanian definite form: Graçanica), is a town and municipality located in Pristina District in Kosovo. As of 2024, the town has a population of 18,486 inhabitants.

It is centered around the Gračanica Monastery, ten kilometers east of Pristina. The 1999 Kosovo War and its aftermath transformed Gračanica from a small village into an administrative center serving the needs of the 75,000 Kosovo Serbs living south of the Ibar River. After the 2013 Brussels Agreement, the municipality was expected to become part of a proposed Community of Serb Municipalities, however the agreement was never implemented as it was deemed unconstitutional. The town is also known for being the location of Gračanica Monastery, one of the richest Serbian medieval monuments from the 14th century.

== History ==
Pope Benedict IX mentioned the village as Grazaniza in a letter from 1303. It was mentioned in King Stefan Milutin's founding charter of the Gračanica Monastery (1321). The name is derived from Slavic Gradac, a toponym of fortified cities In the 15th century the settlement was a notable commercial centre. Until the 17th century it had a notable Ragusan community. It seems that the settlement was abandoned in 1689 during the Austrian penetration into Kosovo in the Great Turkish War. In 1901, it had 60 houses, all Serb, with 400 inhabitants.

=== 2000–present ===
On 6 June 2000, a grenade was thrown into a crowd of ethnic Serbs gathered at the town square while waiting for a bus, resulting in injuries to three individuals and triggering subsequent civil unrest. On 15 March 2004, a Serb teenager was killed in a drive-by shooting in the village of Čaglavica (partially in Gračanica). This incident was among several contributing factors to the inter-ethnic unrest that occurred in Kosovo in 2004. Following the unrest, another Serb teenager, Dimitrije Popović, was fatally shot in a drive-by attack carried out by ethnic Albanian assailants on 5 June 2004.

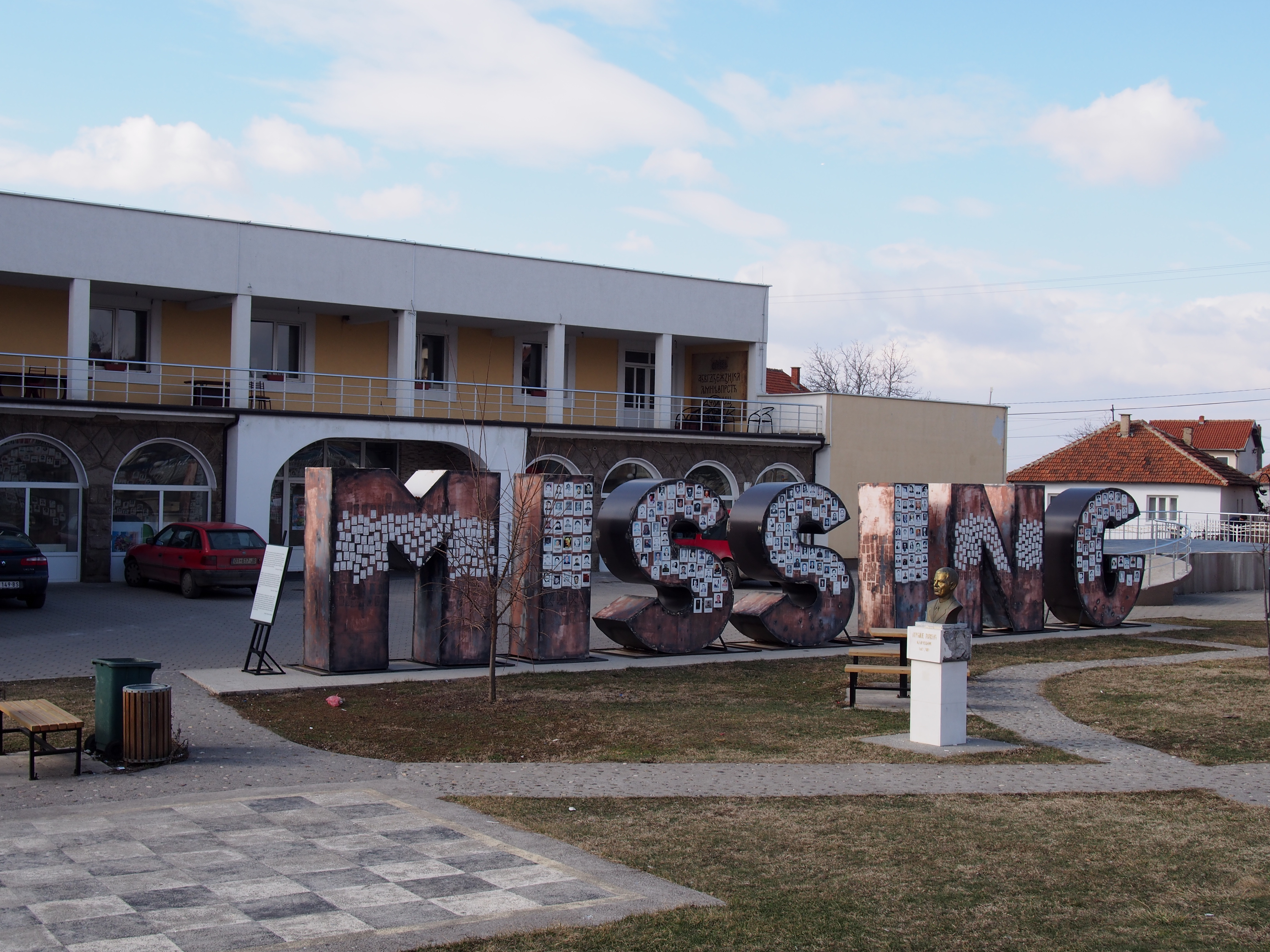
The “Missing” monument to the Serb victims missing from the Kosovo War

== Archaeology ==
A votive altar was found in Gračanica. Dedicated to the well-being of two unnamed emperors, it was erected by priests of Jupiter Dolichenus, possibly between 208 and 211 AD.

== Politics ==
The first municipal elections were held on 15 November 2009. Although the Serbian government urged Serbs to abstain from participating in the elections, which it did not recognise, a significant number chose to vote. As a result, Bojan Stojanović, an ethnic Serb, was elected Mayor.

The town of Gračanica is also temporary seat of the administration of Serbia-claimed Municipality of Pristina. The Serbia-sponsored local elections were held on 11 May 2008. The elections were boycotted by ethnic Albanians, who regard Kosovo as independent from Serbia, resulting in participation predominantly by ethnic Serbs.

== Settlements ==
Aside from the town of Gračanica, the municipality has the following villages:

- Badoci
- Batusha
- Čaglavica (part)
- Dobratin
- Gushterica e Epërme
- Gushterica e Ulët
- Llapllasella
- Lepinë
- Livagja
- Preoc
- Skullan
- Sushicë
- Suhodoll
- Radeva
- Ugljare

== Demographics ==
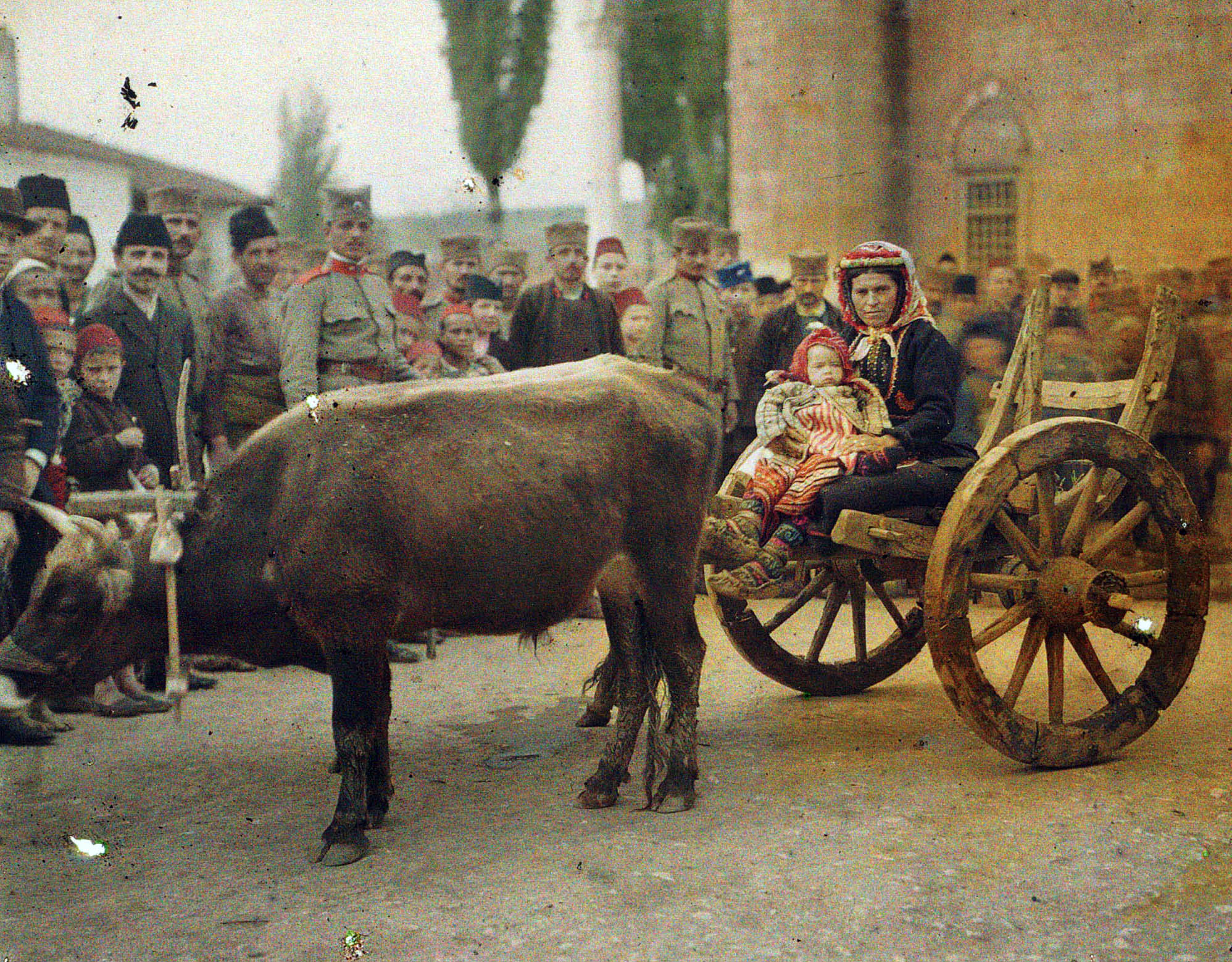
Serbian soldiers and villagers in 1913

Population census
| Year | Pop. | ±% p.a. |
|---|---|---|
| 2011 | 10,675 | — |
| 2024 | 18,486 | +4.31% |

The municipality of Gračanica has 18,486 inhabitants according to the 2024 census. In 2011, the town had 11,931, of which the majority were Serbs, also true for the municipality as a whole; by 2024, however, Serbs and Albanians made up roughly equal parts of the population.

=== Ethnic groups ===
The ethnic composition of the municipality of Gračanica:

| Ethnic group | 2011 census | in % | 2024 census | in % |
|---|---|---|---|---|
| Albanians | 2,474 | 23.17 | 8,623 | 46.65 |
| Serbs | 7,209 | 67.53 | 8,560 | 46.31 |
| Romani | 745 | 6.98 | 909 | 4.92 |
| Ashkali | 104 | 0.97 | 133 | 0.72 |
| Others | 247 | 2.31 | 261 | 1.14 |
| Total | 10,675 | 100 | 18,486 | 100 |

=== Religions ===
The religious composition of the municipality of Gračanica:

| Religion | 2024 census | in % |
|---|---|---|
| Muslim | 9,135 | 49.42 |
| Eastern Orthodox | 8,589 | 46.46 |
| Roman Catholic | 189 | 1.02 |
| Others | 124 | 0.67 |
| No religion | 164 | 0.89 |
| Prefer not to answer | 285 | 1.54 |
| Total | 18,486 | 100.00 |

== Geography and infrastructure ==
The settlement is situated in the spacious valley of the Gračanka river, by the river, on the exit of the gorge between the hill of Veletina (874m) and sloping hill of Glasnovik on the south, and hill of Steževac (794m) on the northeast.

=== Infrastructure ===
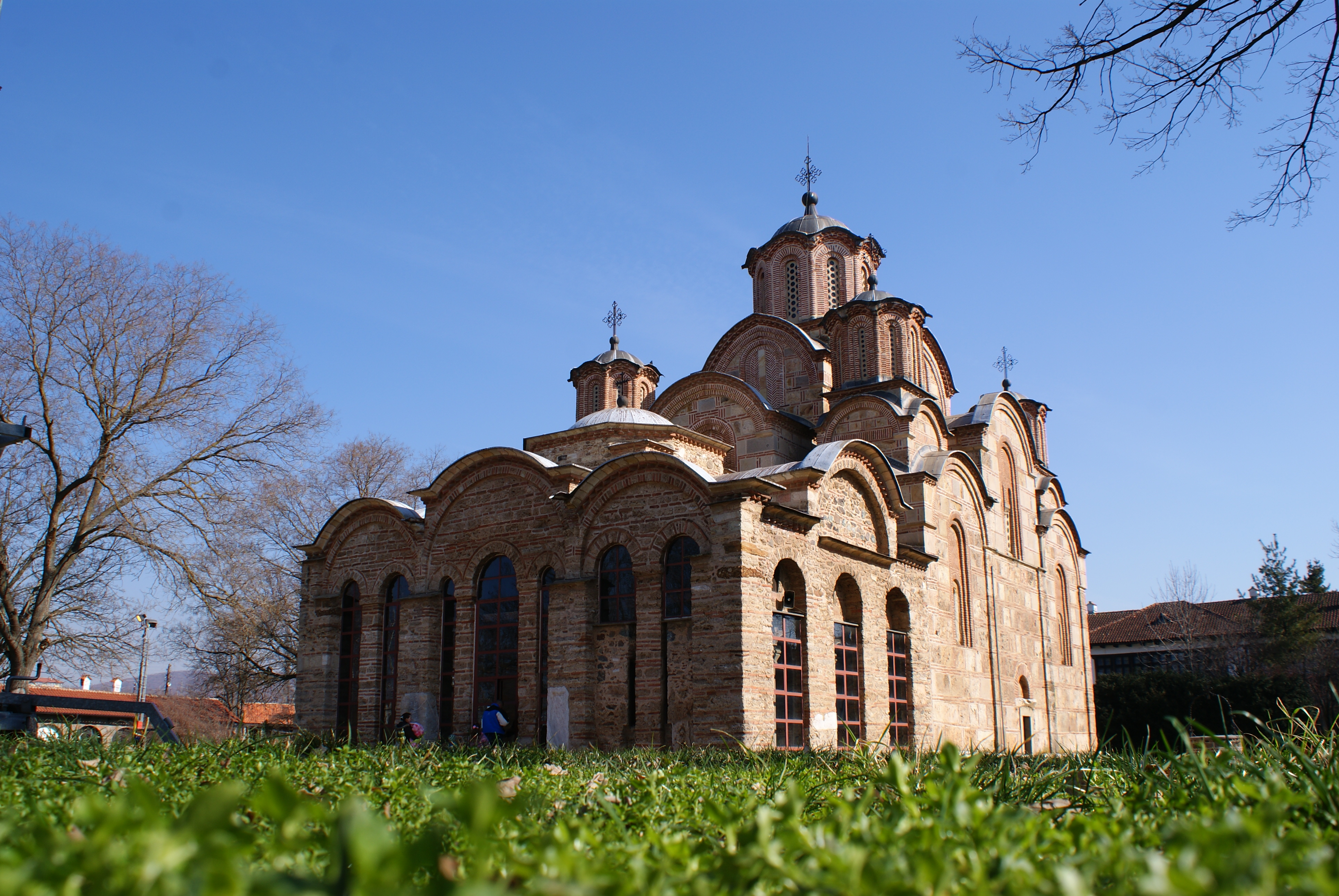
Gračanica Monastery

Gračanica has been a Serb enclave since the end of the 1999 Kosovo War, and is the largest Serbian enclave in central Kosovo. It runs along the Skopje-Pristina road, and unites several neighboring Serbian villages. The enclave, which contains rich farmland and is strategically located in the center of Kosovo, on major roads and near Pristina, has been seen as a potential threat by some Albanian nationalists, who view it as "a den of Serbian intrigue".

Gračanica has an elementary school, several small stores, an open-air market and a police station. The health care center is located in the central part of the town, next to the UNMIK headquarters. An elementary school was reconstructed after the 1999 war.

== See also ==
- Municipalities of Kosovo
- Cities and towns in Kosovo
- Community of Serb Municipalities

== Sources ==
- Ćurčić, Slobodan (1979). Gračanica: King Milutin's Church and Its Place in Late Byzantine Architecture. Pennsylvania State University Press. ISBN 9780271002187.
- Stamenković, Srboljub Đ. (2002). Geografska enciklopedija: naselja Srbije. Geografski fakultet. p. 455. ISBN 9788682657149.
- Urošević, Atanasije (1990). Kosovo. Jedinstvo. ISBN 9788670190849.
