= 2008 unrest in Kosovo =

Unrest following declaration of independence

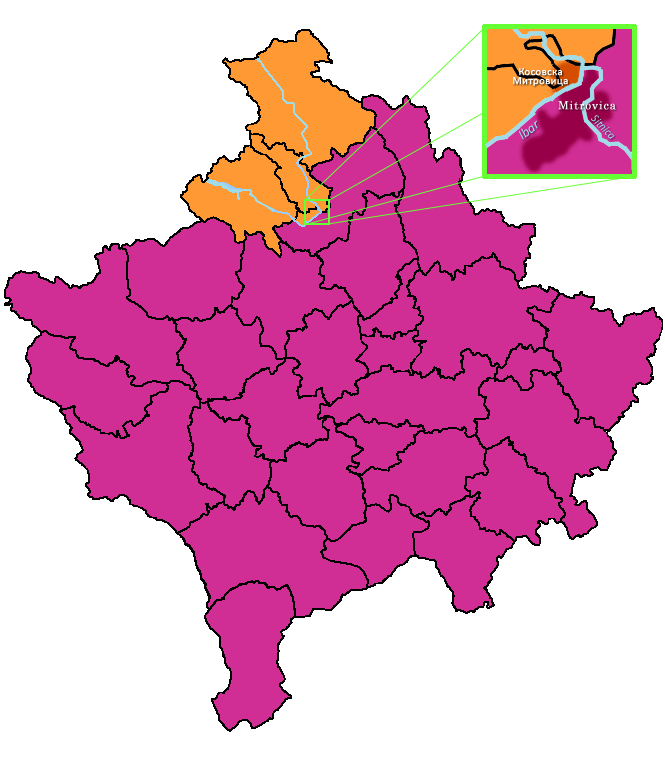
- Map of Kosovo with North Kosovo in orange. Northern Kosovo has been the centre of unrest following Kosovo's declaration of independence.
- Date: February 17 – June 28, 2008
- Location: North Kosovo
- Result: The Community Assembly of Kosovo and Metohija was formed to coordinate resistance to the Kosovar Government

Parties
| Kosovo Serbs | Kosovo Albanians | NATO: Kosovo Force; UNMIK |

Lead figures
| No centralised leadership | No centralised leadership | John Craddock |
- Casualties: 1 dead, 150 injured (total)

The 2008 unrest in Kosovo followed Kosovo's declaration of independence on February 17, 2008. Some Kosovo Serbs opposed to secession boycotted the move by refusing to follow orders from the central government in Pristina and attempted to seize infrastructure and border posts in Serb-populated regions. There were also sporadic instances of violence against international institutions and governmental institutions, predominantly in North Kosovo.

Tensions in the North intensified when Serbs in Mitrovica seized a UN courthouse on March 14, 2008. UN police and NATO forces responded on March 17, and attacks by Serb protesters left one UN police officer dead and as many as 150 people wounded. On June 28, 2008, Kosovo Serbs formed the Community Assembly of Kosovo and Metohija to coordinate resistance to the Kosovar Government.

== Boycott of Kosovo government ==
Kosovo Serbs said they intended to form parallel institutions and assert control over infrastructure and institutions in their area in response to Kosovo's declaration of independence; after the local elections in May, Kosovo Serb leaders announced the intention to establish a Kosovo Serb Assembly. The Serbian Orthodox Church in Kosovo said they would not be in contact with Kosovo's Albanian government, EULEX, or any country which recognizes Kosovo's independence, threatening to sanction any clergy who do so.

A Serb minister said Serbia planned to have its "own police" in Serb areas as part of an action plan to maintain Serbia's presence in Kosovo. In North Kosovo some Serb members of Kosovo security forces stopped taking orders from the government in Pristina and claimed command from the UNMIK. In the eastern Gjilan region around 100 Serb officers were suspended from the Kosovo Police Service. Stanko Jakovljević, Serb mayor of Štrpce, a Serb enclave in the south, said Serb police "will do today what Serbs ... did in northern Kosovo. They will only recognise orders from international police." In central Kosovo 126 Serb police officers withdrew from the Kosovo Police Service refusing to take commands from the central government. Members of the Kosovo Police Service said Serb officers were being intimidated to leave the police force.

On March 3, 2008, Serb railway workers declared they no longer worked for Kosovo after blocking the passage of freight trains from central to northern Kosovo. The head of Serbia's state railroad company Serbian Railways said Serbia was "taking over its responsibilities after nine years" and that the northern part of the railway would be integrated into Serbia's railway system. On March 5, 2008 UNMIK forces said they reclaimed the railway after blocking the entry of Serbian trains into Northern Kosovo warning that any movement of trains south would "not be tolerated". The next day UNMIK officials met with officials from Serbian Railways in Belgrade to discuss the company's demands to run railways in northern Kosovo. The managing director of Serbian Railways Milanko Šarančić said there was no chance of UNMIK running traffic in the north of Kosovo as employees of Serbian Railways terminated their contracts with UNMIK railways. He also said that the company had begun checking lines in the north, as "UNMIK has not maintained the lines properly for nine years."

Serb protestors blocked Albanians from working at the courts in North Kosovska Mitrovica, and Serb judges and court employees demanded that they be allowed to work at the courts instead.

== Attacks on Kosovo border posts ==
On Tuesday February 19, 2008 2,000 Serb protestors, some driving bulldozers, set two border posts on fire along the Kosovo–Serbia border. The destruction of the border posts was sparked by reports that Kosovo Albanian customs officials were planning to man the borders. UN peacekeepers stationed at the checkpoints were forced to abandon the posts until they were reopened the following day. Attacks at the Mutivoda crossing point on Monday February 25, 2008 by 100 Serbs injured 19 members of the Kosovo Police Service and forced the post to be closed until the next day.

== Attacks on the international presence and Kosovo institutions ==
The day after Kosovo's declaration of independence two bombs in the flashpoint town of Mitrovica damaged several UN vehicles, though there were no injuries. After several attacks in northern Kosovska Mitrovica an advance team of the EU administrative force withdrew over security concerns. On March 3, 2008, a UN office in northern Mitrovica was hit by two sniper bullets, with no injuries.

On March 28, 2008, a police checkpoint in northern Kosovo manned by Serb officers came under fire apparently from a semi-automatic weapon fired from the ethnic Albanian village of Koshutevë, north of Mitrovica, and the officers returned fire. No injuries were reported.

On June 26, 2008, in the village of Borivojce near the eastern town of Kamenica members of the local Serb and Roma community barricaded a road to protest the construction of a mosque authorized by the local government. According to a police statement Serb inhabitants put rocks on the road. Around 100 Albanians on the other side of the barricade started to remove the rocks and then threw stones at them. The police statement say the police then intervened to separate the groups, and that a Kosovo Serb and a police officer were injured.

=== Seizure of UN courthouse in Mitrovica ===
On March 14, 2008, after staging rallies for several weeks that prevented ethnic Albanian court employees from entering a UN courthouse in the northern part of Mitrovica, hundreds of Kosovo Serbs broke into the building in the Serb-dominated part of the city, forcing UN police to retreat. UN officials' negotiations with the Serbs to end the occupation were unsuccessful, and on March 17 UN police with the assistance of NATO-led KFOR forces entered the courthouse in a pre-dawn raid. When they arrived they were pelted with stones by around 100 Serbs. When they came out after arresting 53 of the protesters inside the courthouse they were attacked with gunfire, grenades and rocks by several hundred protesters who had massed outside. About half of the protesters who had been arrested were freed by fellow protesters during the clashes with the rest being released by the UN after questioning. The clashes lasted until around noon. One Ukrainian police officer was killed, 70 Serbs and 61 UN and NATO peacekeepers were wounded, and one UN vehicle and one NATO truck were set ablaze. Among the wounded international troops were 27 Polish and 14 Ukrainian police officers and 20 French soldiers. UN police withdrew from northern Mitrovica, leaving the area under the control of the NATO forces.

Gen. John Craddock, NATO's top commander, said that after speaking with NATO commanders in Kosovo that NATO did not feel it necessary to send reinforcements to Kosovo. On 19 March 2008, UN police began to patrol parts of north Mitrovica again together with local Kosovo police, while the NATO peacekeepers still remained in overall control of security at the courthouse and generally in the north of Kosovo. A gradual transition to civilian control was planned over the next days.

== Reactions ==
- International Civilian Representative Pieter Feith, and the EU's envoy to Kosovo, accused Serbia of attempting to "sever the links" between Albanians and Serbs in Kosovo. Feith added that the international steering group set up to supervise Kosovo's independence "will not tolerate partition, because partition of this country is not foreseen and will not be accepted by us." Kosovo's Prime Minister Hashim Thaci said in a joint press conference with Feith that the "functioning of parallel institutions will not be tolerated."
- US Assistant Secretary of State Daniel Fried said Kosovo's response to the "provocations in the north" vindicates the US's decision to recognize Kosovo's independence declaration. Secretary of State Condoleezza Rice urged Serbian leaders to press the minority Serb community in Kosovo to avoid "provocative action" following the clashes in Mitrovica March 17.
- European Union officials urged for UNMIK to secure the borders of Kosovo leading up to the arrival of the EU's mission in Kosovo with Dutch Foreign Minister Maxime Verhagen saying they wanted to avoid a "soft partition" of Kosovo.
- Serbia's President Boris Tadić accused the international forces in Kosovo of using "excessive force" and warned of "an escalation of unrest on all the territory of the province" following clashes in Mitrovica over UN court seizures. Serbia's caretaker Prime Minister Vojislav Koštunica said his government was consulting with Russia on joint steps to stop "all forms of violence against Kosovo Serbs" and accused NATO of "implementing a policy of force against Serbia". It was reported steps could include the deployment of Russian troops in the north. Minister for Kosovo Slobodan Samardžić told protesters, "We will protect you just like we protect the Serbs in Serbia."
- Russia called for a resumption of talks on the status of Kosovo, saying the unrest was a result of the territory's unilateral independence declaration.
- UN Secretary-General Ban Ki-moon condemned the attacks against UN and NATO-led forces following the clashes on March 17 and urged "all communities to exercise calm and restraint."
- Bulgaria's Foreign Ministry issued a statement expressing concern over unrest and calling for Serbs in Kosovo to avoid violence.
- Austrian Foreign Minister Ursula Plassnik called on Serbia and Kosovo Serb leaders to promote calm in the region adding, "The Serbian government has repeatedly vowed to refrain from violence as a political tool. This must also be carried out consistently."
- Bosnia and Herzegovina’s Milorad Dodik, the prime minister of Republika Srpska said the use of force against Serb protesters in northern Kosovo was "inappropriate whatever the cause for that might be."

== See also ==
- Bac u kry
- 2004 unrest in Kosovo
- 2008 protests against Kosovo declaration of independence
- North Kosovo crisis (2011–2013)
- 2021 North Kosovo crisis
