= Uglara =

Uglara (Albanian: Uglarë) may refer to:

- Uglara, Gjilan, a village near Gjilan
- Uglara, Fushë Kosova, a village near Fushë Kosova
- Uglara, Zubin Potok, a village near Zubin Potok

== See also ==
- Ugljare (disambiguation)
