= Church of St. Elijah, Podujevë =

Church of St. Elijah
- Црква Светог Илије Громовника; Kisha e Shën Ilias Bubullimës
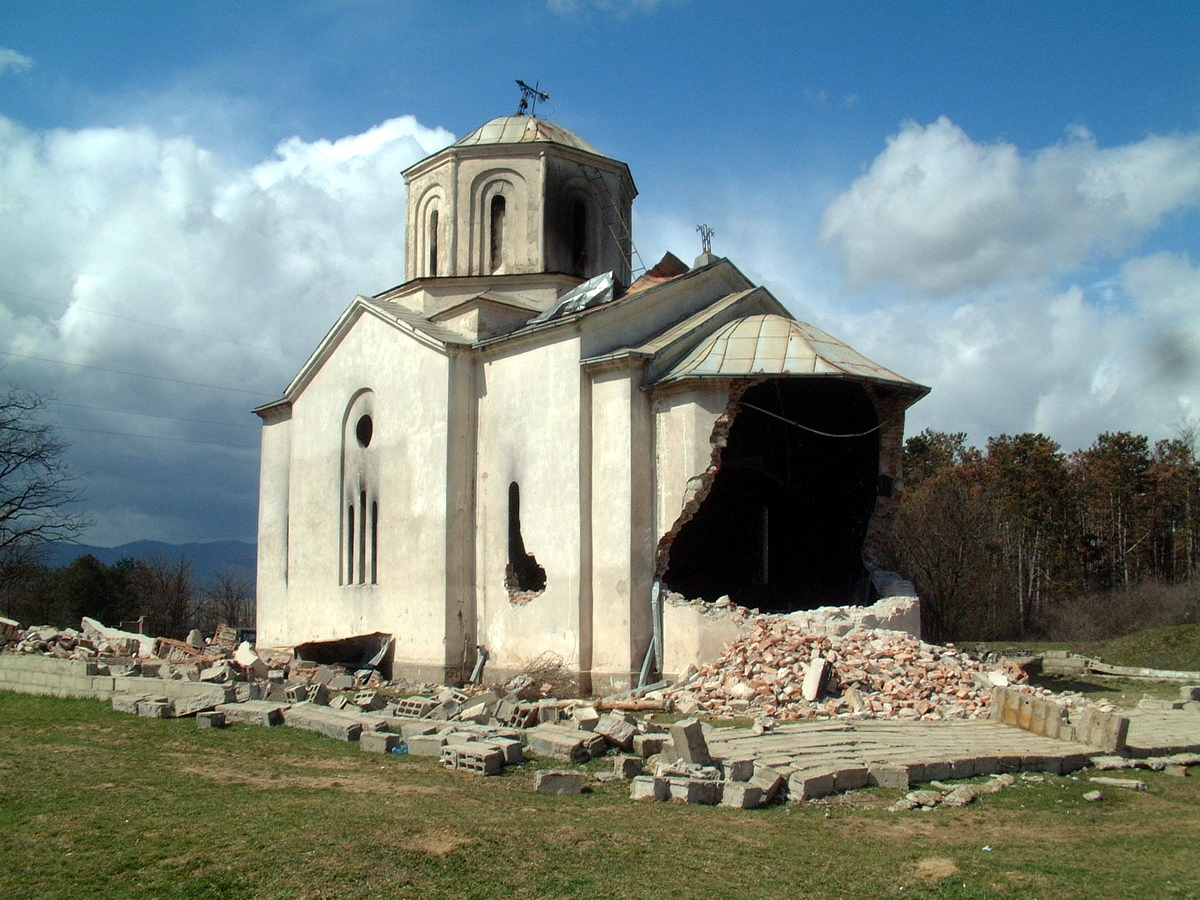
- Church of St. Elijah after its 2004 destruction by Kosovo Albanians

- Location in Kosovo
- 42.907°N 21.203°E
- Location: Podujevë
- Country: Kosovo
- Denomination: Serbian Orthodox

History
- Status: Church
- Founded: 1929
- Dedication: Saint Elijah; Saint Andrew

Architecture
- Functional status: Active
- Completed: 1930
- Demolished: 1941–1971, 1999, 2004–2005, 2006

Administration
- Diocese: Diocese of Raška and Prizren

The Church of Saint Elijah (Serbian: Црква светог Илије, romanized: Crkva svetog Ilije; Albanian: Kisha e Shën Ilias), also known as Saint Andrew's Church, is а Serbian Orthodox church located on a small hill near the city of Podujevo (Podujevë), in Kosovo. The complex includes an Orthodox cemetery. It was built in 1929, and has been demolished several times, as of 2010, the church has been rebuilt and renovated five times.

== History ==
=== 1941 destruction ===
The Church was shelled, and dome was destroyed in 1941, during World War II. The Albanian nationalist group Balli Kombëtar was responsible for the shelling. Later, after the creation of Yugoslavia, the church was restored by the Serbian residents of Podujevë Reconstruction was finally finished in 1971.

=== 1999 attack ===
In 1999, the church was burnt down in what appeared to "be a well-planned action, conducted by criminal elements" after Kosovo Force (KFOR) patrols changed shifts. The barb wire that guarded building was cut and the door was forced open. It was found to be demolished, desecrated and its interior was burned.

=== 2004 destruction ===
In 2003, UNMIK made a request of the Diocese of Raška and Prizren to evacuate movable church inventory, as an attack seemed inevitable. The church was destroyed on 18 March 2004, during 2004 unrest in Kosovo. According to Czech KFOR Captain, Jindrich Plescher, the church was attacked by a mob of 500 Albanians. Czech media confirmed that Czech soldiers had to leave the Church compound that was destroyed along with the cemetery. The Albanians set a large fire in the middle of the church which severely burned it. Plescher stated that the Albanian attackers had dug up coffins from the nearby Serbian cemetery and scattered the bones of the dead. St. Andrew was shelled, a bell tower completely destroyed with explosives and the wall that surrounded the church was demolished. The Reconstruction Implementation Commission, an EU funded project managed by the European Commission Liaison Office implemented by the Council of Europe, in order to promote the Rehabilitation of Cultural Heritage in Kosovo, noted:

"Looted and burnt down. Apse blown up with explosives. Floors, internal surfaces and joinery damaged. Roof cover partially removed. Boundary wall demolished."

==== Theft of the Bell ====
After the destruction of the church, Czech KFOR soldiers found and confiscated the stolen bell of the St. Elijah Church from an Albanian family. The bell was a gift from Yugoslav King Alexander I Karađorđević to the Podujevë Church in 1932, two years prior to his assassination in Marseilles. The Albanian representatives asked three times for the bell, saying that the bell belonged to the Podujevë municipality. The Czech KFOR battalion refused, saying that the bell is the property of the Serbian Orthodox Church, and Lieutenant colonel Josef Kopecky with Czech and Slovak soldiers delivered the bell to the Gračanica Monastery. The chaplain of the battalion personally cleaned the bell.

=== 2006 attack ===
On 12 May 2006, the church was attacked once again by Kosovo Albanians. After partial reconstruction, led by the Council of Europe fund, the main doors of the church were breached, and all of the windows on the church were broken again.

== See also ==
- Anti-Serb sentiment
- Battle of Podujevo
- Podujevo bus bombing
- Podujevo massacre
