= Ugljare =

Ugljare (Serbian Cyrillic: Угљаре) may refer to:

- Ugljare, Gnjilane, a village near Gnjilane
- Ugljare, Kosovo Polje, a village near Kosovo Polje
- Ugljare, Zubin Potok, a village near Zubin Potok

== See also ==
- Uglara (disambiguation)
