= 2004 unrest in Kosovo =

Ethnic violence in Kosovo

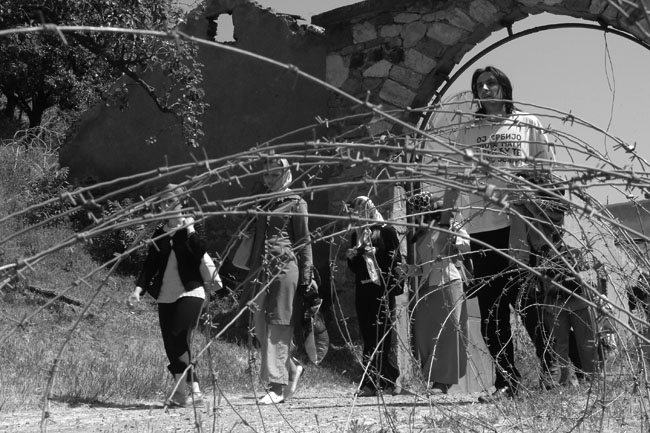
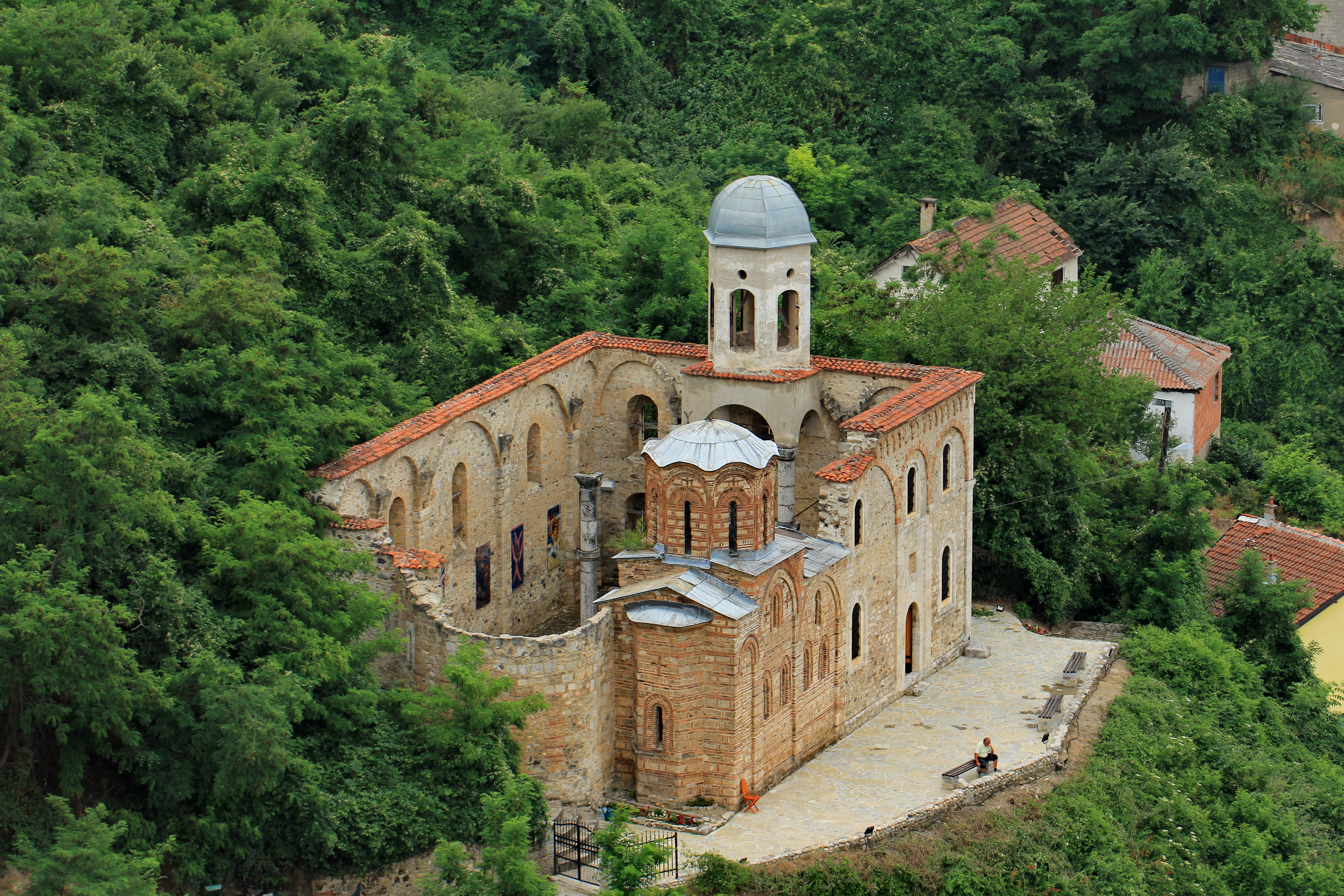
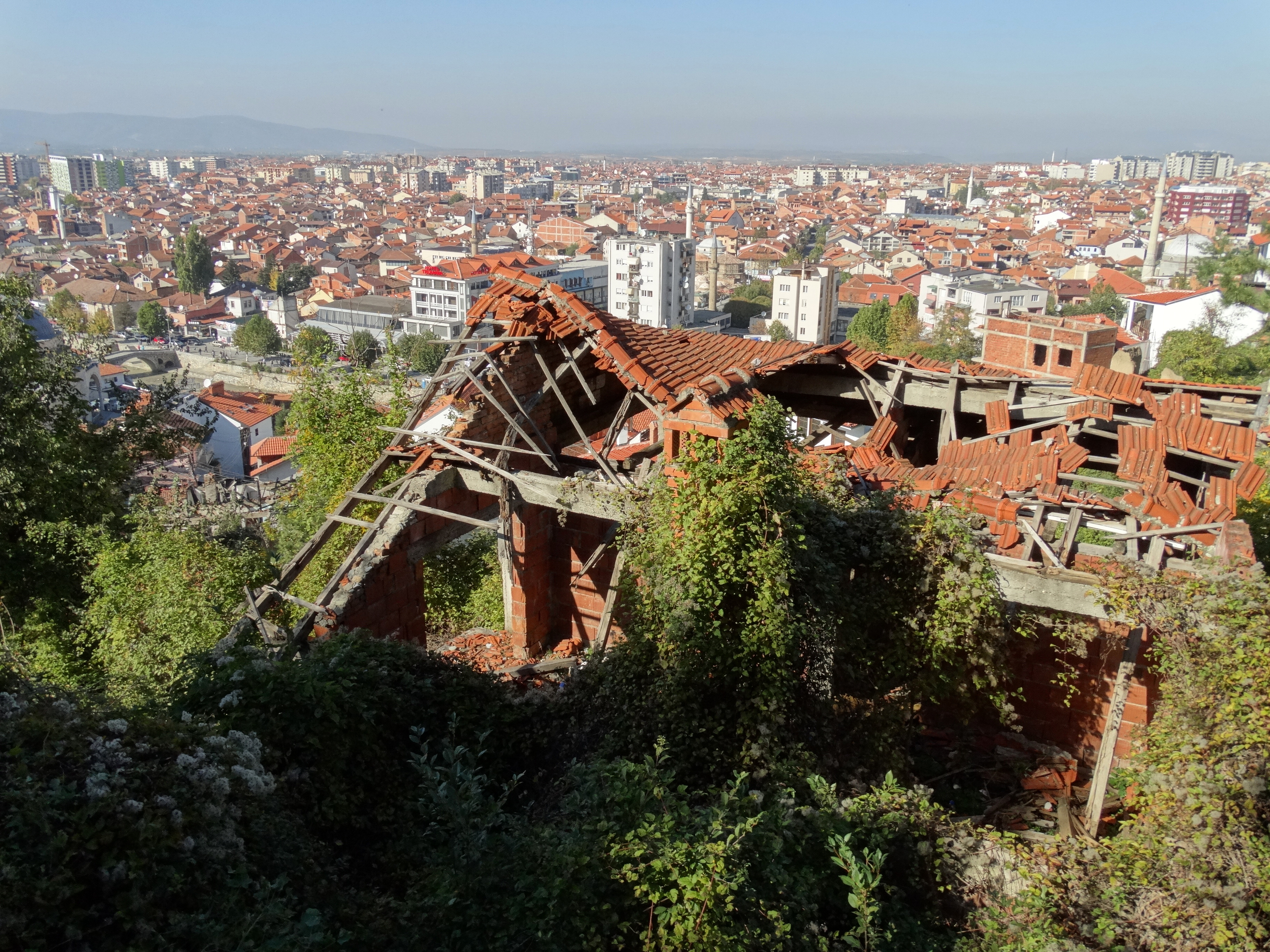
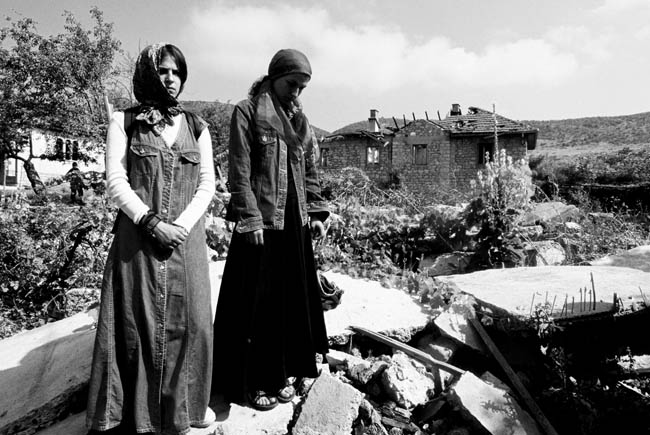
- Ruins of Serbian houses and Serbian Orthodox monasteries
- Date: 17–18 March 2004 (1 day)
- Location: Kosovo under UN administration
- Result: 19 dead (11 Albanians and 8 Serbs) and more than 4,000 Serbs expelled from Kosovo.; 935 houses and 35 Orthodox churches and monasteries desecrated, damaged or destroyed; Inclusion of Medieval Monuments in the UNESCO World Heritage in Danger; Burning of mosques in Belgrade and other places in Serbia and Montenegro

Parties
(Serbia) Kosovo Serbs	(Albania) Kosovo Albanians; Kosovo Police	UNMIK; KFOR

Number
Unknown	Over 70,000	

Casualties and losses
8 killed	11 killed	

On 17–18 March 2004, violence erupted in Kosovo, leaving hundreds wounded and at least 19 people dead. The unrest was precipitated by unsubstantiated reports in the Kosovo Albanian media which claimed that three Kosovo Albanian boys had drowned after being chased into the Ibar River by a group of Kosovo Serbs. UN peacekeepers and NATO troops scrambled to contain a gun battle between Serbs and Albanians in the partitioned town of Mitrovica, before the violence spread to other parts of Kosovo. Kosovo Serb communities and cultural heritage were attacked by crowds of Albanians. Serbs call the event the March Pogrom (Serbian: Мартовски погром, romanized: Martovski pogrom), while the Albanians call it the March Unrest (Albanian: Trazirat e marsit).

The violence resulted in the displacement of more than 4,000 Kosovo Serbs and other minorities. More than 935 houses, along with 35 Serbian Orthodox churches, monasteries and other religious buildings were destroyed. International and domestic courts in Pristina have prosecuted people who have taken part in the violence, including those who attacked several Serbian Orthodox churches, handing down prison sentences ranging from 21 months to 16 years. Some of the destroyed churches have since been rebuilt by the Government of Kosovo in cooperation with the Serbian Orthodox Church and the UN mission in Kosovo. The events led to protests in Serbia, and the burning of mosques in Belgrade and other places.

== Background ==
The Kosovo Liberation Army (KLA) was an ethnic-Albanian organisation which had as its founding goal unification of Albanian inhabited lands in the Balkans, stressing Albanian culture, ethnicity and nation. Conflict escalated from 1997 onward due to the Yugoslav army retaliating with a crackdown in the region resulting in violence and population displacements. The bloodshed, ethnic cleansing of thousands of Albanians driving them into neighbouring countries and the potential of it to destabilize the region provoked intervention by international organizations and agencies, such as the United Nations, NATO and INGOs. Some people from non-Albanian communities such as the Serbs and Romani fled Kosovo fearing revenge attacks by armed people and returning refugees while others were pressured by the KLA and armed gangs to leave. Post conflict Kosovo was placed under an international United Nations framework with the UN Interim Administration Mission in Kosovo (UNMIK) overseeing administrative affairs and the NATO Kosovo Force (KFOR) dealing with defence. Within post-conflict Kosovo Albanian society, calls for retaliation for previous violence done by Serb forces during the war circulated through public culture. Following the assassination of Zoran Đinđić and the reduction in the number of KFOR military personnel, tolerance between communities began to wane. On 13 August 2003, four ethnic Serbs were wounded and two killed when unknown assailants opened fire with automatic rifles on a group of mostly children by a river in the village of Goraždevac. Preparations were underway for the start of negotiations on the status of the territory between representatives of the Albanians on one side and Serbia and Montenegro on the other. In 2004, prolonged negotiations over Kosovo's future status, sociopolitical problems and nationalist sentiments resulted in the Kosovo unrest.

== Prelude ==
=== Shooting of Serbian teen ===
On 15 March 2004 an 18-year-old Serb, Jovica Ivić, was shot and wounded in a drive-by shooting in the village of Čaglavica in the central region of Kosovo.

=== 16 March pro-KLA protests ===
On 16 March, three KLA war veterans associations organized widespread demonstrations in ethnic Albanian cities and towns, protesting the arrests of former KLA leaders on war crime charges, including the February arrests of four commanders. The pro-KLA, anti-UNMIK protests, with 18,000 protesters, lay the basis for the following demonstrations sparked by the sensational reports of drowning of three Albanian children.

=== Drowning of Albanian children ===
On 16 March, three Albanian children drowned in the Ibar River in the village of Çabër, near the Serb community of Zubin Potok. A fourth boy survived. Initial reports alleged that the children had been chased into the river by Serbs, possibly in relation to the shooting of Ivić the previous day, but no evidence was found to confirm these claims.

UN police spokesman Neeraj Singh said the surviving boy had been under intense pressure from ethnic Albanian journalists who had suggested what he should say. His version of events differed from that of two other children who had also been in the river, Singh told a news conference in Pristina. The spokesperson said there were "very significant" inconsistencies in the accounts given by the child during two separate interviews, and a lack of corroboration of his story. "In fact, it is logically at odds in several respects with other evidence," Mr. Singh said. The UN found no evidence that Serbs were responsible for drowning the three Albanian children.

== Violence ==
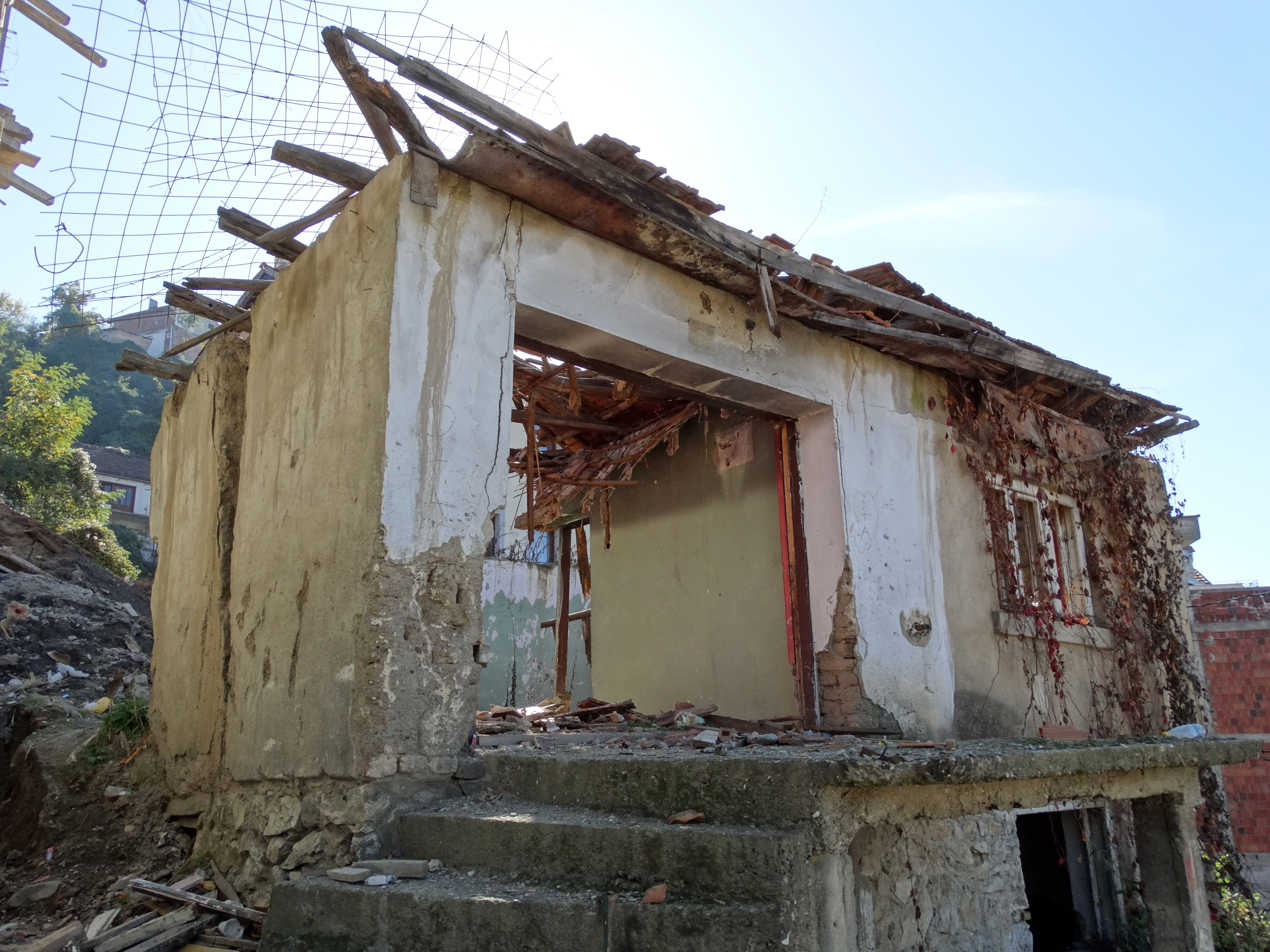
Ruins of a Kosovo Serb house in Prizren that was destroyed by rioters.

On 17 and 18 March 2004, a wave of violent riots swept through Kosovo, triggered by two incidents perceived as ethnically motivated acts. Demonstrations, although seemingly spontaneous at the outset, quickly focused on Serbs throughout Kosovo.

Thousands of Albanians gathered at the south end of the bridge across the Ibar at Mitrovica, which divides the Serb and Albanian districts of the town. A large crowd of Serbs gathered at the north end to prevent the Albanians from crossing. Peacekeepers from the NATO-led Kosovo Force (KFOR) blockaded the bridge, using tear gas, rubber bullets and stun grenades to keep the crowds apart.

The violence quickly spread to other parts of Kosovo, with Kosovo Serb communities and Serbian cultural heritage (churches and monasteries) attacked by crowds of Albanians. Serb returnees were attacked. Some of the locations were ostensibly under the protection of KFOR at the time. During the riots and violence, at least 35 churches were damaged, including 18 monuments of culture, which were demolished, burnt or severely damaged. According to Human Rights Watch, the violence resulted in the deaths of nineteen people; 8 Kosovo Serbs and 11 Kosovo Albanians. More than a thousand were wounded including more than 120 KFOR personnel. More than 4,000 Serbs were driven out of their homes and more than 900 houses belonging to non-Albanians were burned.

By one estimate, more than 50,000 people participated in the riots.

=== Čaglavica ===
In Čaglavica, 12,000 Kosovo Albanian rioters tried to storm the Serb-populated areas. KFOR peacekeepers from Sweden, Norway and Finland led by Swedish Lieutenant Colonel Hans Håkansson created a blockade by using tear gas, rubber bullets, and stun grenades, in order to keep the two groups apart. A truck was driven by a Kosovo Albanian at full speed towards the barricade in an attempt to penetrate the line. After firing warning shots at the truck, the peacekeepers had to use deadly force to avoid friendly casualties, and shot the driver. 16 peacekeepers were injured, and 13 had to be evacuated.

Another KFOR unit consisting of mostly Swedish soldiers also participated in defending Čaglavica that day, supported by people from the barracks who normally worked with non-military tasks. Lieutenant Colonel Hans Håkansson, who commanded 700 people during the unrest, reported that the fighting went on for 11 hours, and that many collapsed due to dehydration and injuries while struggling to fend off waves of rioters. In total, 35 people were injured while defending the town. Hans Håkansson was awarded with a medal for his actions by the Royal Swedish Academy of War Sciences in 2005.

=== Pristina ===
Following the attacks in Čaglavica, the mob of Albanians turned their attention on the few remaining Serbs living in Pristina in the YU Program apartments. The apartments came under attack after the mob of Albanians blocked all of the entrances and set fire to the ground floors. Serbs who tried to flee the apartments were shot at by firearms or stabbed by members of the crowd. The mob began to loot apartments and were chanting pro Kosovo Liberation Army chants and calling for the killing of Serbs. It took KFOR (mainly Irish Soldiers) and UNMIK police over 6 hours to evacuate the Serbs who were under constant fire from armed Albanians. Following the evacuation the crowd began to converge on the Church of the Christ Savour burning and damaging the facade and inside.

=== Peja/Peć ===
Albanians rioted in the city of Peja, attacking UN offices. One knife-wielding Albanian was shot and killed by UN police in the village of Belo Polje where Serb returnees were attacked. They sheltered at the local church. When they were ordered to evacuate, the Italian KFOR troops did not approach the church, leaving the evacuees vulnerable to attacks; 11 required first aid treatment for their injuries.

=== Obiliq/Obilić ===
In the town of Obiliq, burning of Serb homes took place along with the church. Witnesses state that Kosovo Police officers did not intervene and some participated in the violence.

=== Lipjan/Lipljan ===
Albanians and KFOR were engaged in gunfights in the town of Lipjan. Four Serbs were murdered, while Serbs taking refuge in the local Orthodox church were attacked.

=== Vushtrri/Vučtrn ===
All Serb houses in the Serb-inhabited village of Svinjare in Vushtrri, near Kosovo Mitrovica, were burnt down. In the village of Sllatina, a group of Albanians threw stones at Serb houses; several elderly Serbs were severely beaten and wounded. In Vushtrri, rioters targeted the Ashkali community after burning the Serbian Orthodox Church of Saint Elijah. 69 homes were burned. Some Kosovo Police Service officers participated in the violence, arresting and abusing Ashkalis who were defending their homes.

=== Fushë Kosovo/Kosovo Polje ===
Every Serb home and institution in Kosovo Polje was burned, including the main post office, school, hospital and church. Several Serbs were severely beaten, one to death.

=== Gjakova/Đakovica ===
Serb homes and the Serbian Orthodox church in Gjakova were destroyed by Albanian rioters after the residents were evacuated and Italian KFOR withdrew.

=== Prizren ===
On 17 March, ethnic Albanians started attacking the Serb settlement in Prizren, including the Seminary, and reportedly there was no UNMIK, Kosovo Police and KFOR present there at the time. The mob set the Seminary on fire, with people inside, and beat several elder people, with one man dying in the burning.

The German KFOR's refusal to mobilize to protect the local Serbs are one of the main security failures of the 2004 unrest. UNMIK in Prizren said that the terror, 56 Serb houses and 5 historical churches that were burnt down, could have been prevented by KFOR.

== Destroyed churches ==
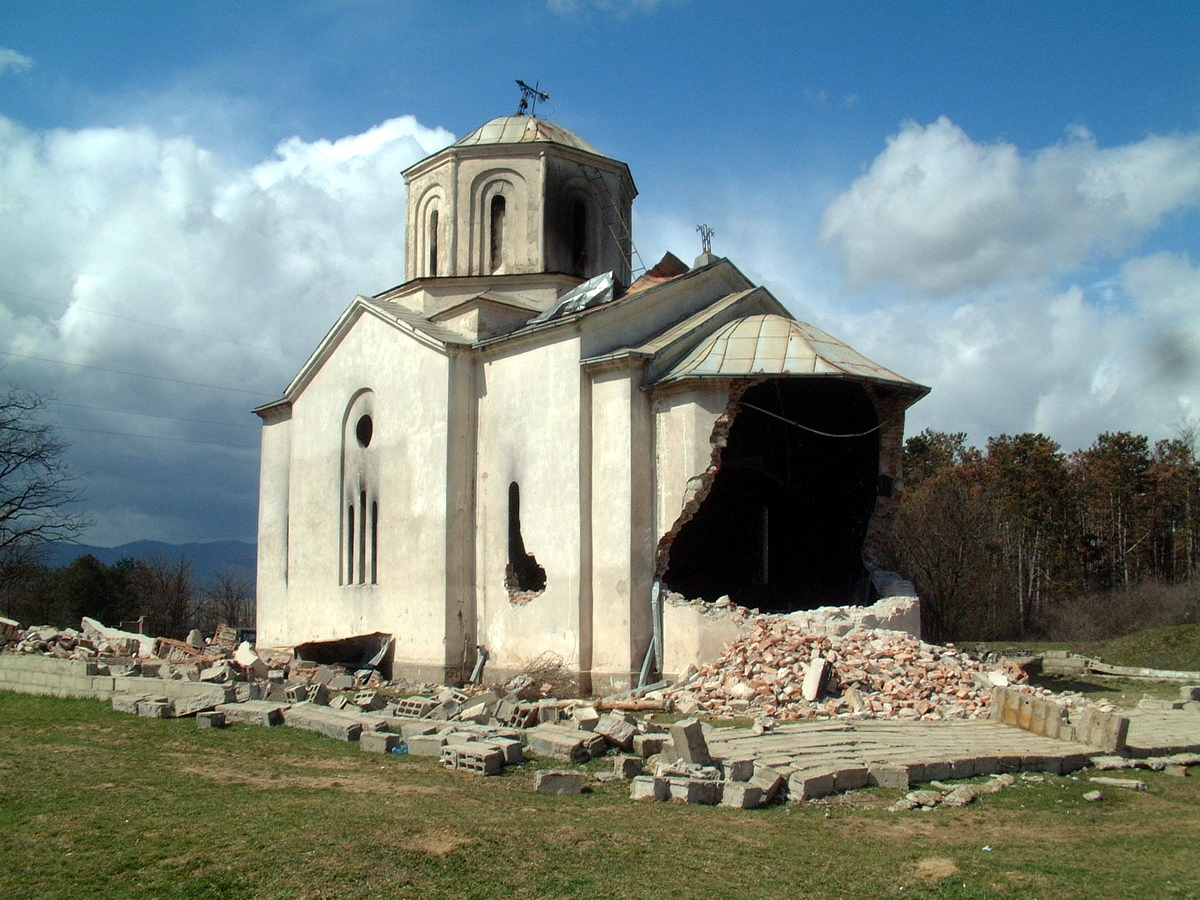
Serbian Orthodox church of St. Elijah in Podujevo destroyed in 2004 unrest by Kosovo Albanians

In an urgent appeal, issued on 18 March by the extraordinary session of the Expanded Convocation of the Holy Synod of Serbian Orthodox Church (SPC), it was reported that a number of Serbian churches and shrines in Kosovo had been damaged or destroyed by rioters. At least 30 sites were completely destroyed, more or less destroyed, or further destroyed (sites that had been previously damaged). Apart from the churches and monasteries, tens of support buildings (such as parish buildings, economical buildings and residences) were destroyed, bringing the number close to 35 buildings of the SPC destroyed.

All churches and objects of the SPC in Prizren were destroyed. The list includes several UNESCO World Heritage Sites. Among those destroyed and damaged were:

- St Elijah's Church in Podujevo destroyed and desecrated, coffins from the nearby Serbian cemetery were dug up, and bones of the dead were scattered away.
- Skenderaj: Devič Monastery in Drenica, nuns evacuated by Danish soldiers, monastery pillaged and torched, the tomb of St Joannicius of Devič was desecrated.
- Our Lady of Ljeviš in Prizren from 1307 (UNESCO World Heritage Site)
- the Church of Holy Salvation in Prizren, destroyed by vandals after German KFOR troops had left the site.
- Church of St George in Prizren (the city's largest church)
- Church of St George in Prizren (Runjevac)
- Church of St. Kyriaki, Church of St Nicolas (Tutić Church) in Prizren
- Monastery of The Holy Archangels in Prizren
- Prizren's Orthodox seminary of Saint Cyrillus and Methodius in Prizren

HRW lists 27 Orthodox churches and monasteries burned and looted.

== Reactions in Kosovo ==
Kosovo Albanian politicians such as President Ibrahim Rugova and Prime Minister Bajram Rexhepi joined UN governor Harri Holkeri, NATO southern commander Gregory Johnson, and other KFOR officials in condemning the violence and appealing for peace in Kosovo.

Hashim Thaçi, the former Kosovo Liberation Army (KLA) leader, "rejected ethnic division of Kosovo and said independence is a pre-condition for stability in the region." He has also said, "Kosovo, NATO and the West have not fought for Kosovo only for Albanians, nor for a Kosovo ruled by violence. Violence is not the way to solve problems, violence only creates problems."

Kosovo Police established a special investigation team to handle cases related to the 2004 unrest. According to statistics released by the UNMIK in 2008, 242 people have been charged for the March violence and a further 157 for misdemeanors. International prosecutors and judges have dealt with cases involving serious crimes such as murder, attempted murder, incitement to national hatred and causing general danger with the rest being dealt by domestic courts. By April 2008, 301 had been convicted and 86 were handed prison sentences, the maximum of which was 16 years. By March 2010, 143 Kosovo Albanians were convicted, of which 67 received prison terms of over a year.

== Reactions in Serbia ==
The events in Kosovo brought an immediate angry reaction on the streets of Serbia. On the evening of 17 March, crowds gathered in Belgrade, Novi Sad and Niš to demonstrate against the treatment of the Kosovo Serbs. Despite appeals for calm by Metropolitan Amfilohije, the 16th-century Bajrakli Mosque was set on fire. Islam-aga's Mosque in the southern city of Niš was also set on fire, while demonstrators chanted "Kill, kill Albanians!" When police arrived the mosque was already burning and some media reported that the police didn't move the crowd, so they blocked the fire fighters access to the mosque, leaving them unable to extinguish the fire. Both buildings were extensively damaged but were saved from complete destruction by the intervention of police and firefighters. Also properties of Muslim minorities, such as Goranis, Turks or Albanians were vandalized in Novi Sad and other cities throughout Serbia. Human Rights Watch has concluded that the Serbian state failed to prosecute violence in Novi Sad.

The Serbian government publicly denounced the violence in Kosovo. Prime Minister Vojislav Koštunica strongly criticized the failure of NATO and the UN to prevent the violence, and called for a state of emergency to be imposed on Kosovo. He gave a speech blaming organized Albanian separatists: "The events in northern Kosovo-Metohija reveal the true nature of Albanian separatism, its violent and terrorist nature ... [The government will] do all it can to stop the terror in Kosovo". The Minister of Minority Rights of Serbia and Montenegro, Rasim Ljajić, himself a Muslim, said "What is now happening in Kosovo confirms two things: that this is a collapse of the international mission, and a total defeat of the international community." Nebojsa Čović, the Serbian government's chief negotiator on matters relating to Kosovo, was sent to Mitrovica on 18 March in a bid to calm the situation there. Serbian security forces also guarded the border between Serbia and Kosovo in a bid to prevent demonstrators and paramilitaries from entering the province to foment further unrest. The events were compared by Prime Minister Koštunica to ethnic cleansing.

The Serbs, represented by the "Union of Serbs in Kosovo and Metohija", described the ordeal as "genocide" in a letter sent to the Serbian and Russian patriarchs, to Russian President Vladimir Putin and the Serbian government, where, besides that, they quote the burning of seven villages during the World War II-German occupation to the "several hundreds" burnt "under the rule of the troops of Christian Europe and America" and according to which the "occupation of Kosovo surpasses all we had to sustain under fascism." The spared Serb villages are compared to "concentration camps" because of the missing freedom of movement, electricity and heating. According to the letter, after 1999 there were 8,500 homicides or disappearances of non-Albanian people with no single accomplice tried.

In 2011, seven years after the incident, Foreign Minister Vuk Jeremić spoke at the Wheaton College in Chicago, US:

"In less than 72 hours, 35 churches and monasteries were set on fire, many of which date back to the 14th century or even further away in history, which represents an irretrievable loss for the mankind. Dozens of people were killed. Several thousand were wounded. Thousands of houses and shops were leveled to the ground. More than 4,000 Kosovo Serbs were expelled from their homes."

— Vuk Jeremić

In Serbia the events were also called the March Pogrom.

== International reaction ==
KFOR troops closed Kosovo's borders with the remainder of Serbia and Montenegro and the UN suspended flights in and out of the province. NATO announced on 18 March that it would send another 1,000 troops, 750 of them from the United Kingdom, to reinforce the 18,500 troops already there.

The UN and European Union both appealed for calm, calling on local leaders to restrain their supporters. UN Secretary General Kofi Annan urged both sides to cooperate with the peacekeeping forces but pointedly reminded the Kosovo Albanians that they had a responsibility "to protect and promote the rights of all people within Kosovo, particularly its minorities".

An Austrian OSCE official called the events an orchestrated plan to drive out the remaining Serbs, while one anonymous UNMIK official reportedly referred to the event as Kosovo's Kristallnacht. The commander of NATO's South Flank, Admiral Gregory G. Johnson, said on 19 March that the violence verged on ethnic cleansing of Serbs by Albanians. On 20 March, Kosovo's UN administrator, Harri Holkeri, told journalists that "Maybe the very beginning was spontaneous but after the beginning certain extremist groups had an opportunity to orchestrate the situation and that is why we urgently are working to get those perpetrators into justice."

KFOR and UNIMK were criticized for their inadequate response in protecting Serbs and other minorities from Albanian rioters. Human Rights Watch pointed specifically to the example of French peacekeepers in the village of Svinjare, accusing them of not helping besieged Serbs even though their main base was a few hundred metres away.

According to Amnesty International, at least 27 people died—11 Albanians and 16 Serbs—and over 1,000 were injured while some 730 houses belonging to minorities, mostly Kosovo Serbs, as well as 36 Orthodox churches, monasteries and other religious and cultural sites were damaged or destroyed. In less than 48 hours, 4,100 minority community members were newly displaced (more than the total of 3,664 that had returned throughout 2003), of whom 82% were Serbs and the remaining 18% included Romani (and Ashkali) as well as an estimated 350 Albanians from the Serb-majority areas of Kosovska Mitrovica and Leposavić.

- Denmark pledged to send an additional 100 peacekeepers to the region after the violence began.
- Germany's Defence Minister Peter Struck said on 19 March that a further 600 peacekeepers were being sent to join German forces in Kosovo, with deployment to the region beginning on 20 March.
- France pledged to send about 400 more troops immediately to the region after the violence began.
- Russia and Serbia-Montenegro called for an emergency meeting of the UN Security Council, which condemned the violence. On 19 March, the Russian Duma passed a resolution (397 to 0) calling for the return of Serbia-Montenegro's troops.
- (Federal Republic of Yugoslavia) Serbian Prime Minister Vojislav Koštunica described the attacks as "planned in advance and co-ordinated... this was an attempted pogrom and ethnic cleansing" against Kosovo's Serbs.
- The United Kingdom sent an additional 750 peacekeeping soldiers, which arrived in the region's capital Pristina within 24 hours of the first attacks, to reinforce British troops already on the ground.
- (United States) White House spokesman Scott McClellan told reporters the Bush administration called "on all groups to end the violence and refrain from violence." The U.S. State Department also repeated its call to stop the violence, stating: "The escalating violence threatens the process of democratization and reconciliation in Kosovo and must end."

== See also ==
- Persecution of Serbs
- Destruction of Serbian heritage in Kosovo
- Destruction of Albanian heritage in Kosovo
- Gračanica bus bombing
- Stolen Kosovo, documentary
- 2008 unrest in Kosovo
- 2003 Goraždevac murders
- Kosovo Serb enclaves
