= Frashër, Kosovo =

Frashër Svinjare
- Village
- Location within Kosovo
- Coordinates: 42°51′04″N 20°53′23″E
- Country: Kosovo
- District: Mitrovicë
- Municipality: Mitrovicë
- Elevation: 512 m (1,680 ft)

Population (2024)
  - Total: 564
- Time zone: UTC+1 (CET)

Frashër, or Svinjare, is a village in northern Kosovo, near Mitrovicë. It has 567 inhabitants, of whom 561 are Albanians, 4 are Bosniaks, and the ethnicity of two is unknown, according to the 2011 census.

== History ==
During the Kosovo War, the Albanian population was expelled and their 65 houses were burnt.

During the March 2004 unrest in Kosovo, the village was razed by Kosovo Albanians, and the village became a ghost town.

In 2014, a 48-hectare industrial park was built.
