= Stolen Kosovo =

- Stolen Kosovo poster
- Directed by: Václav Dvořák
- Written by: Václav Dvořák
- Produced by: Aleš Bednář
- Release date: July 27, 2008
- Running time: 57 minutes
- Country: Czech Republic
- Languages: Czech; Serbian; Albanian

Stolen Kosovo (Czech: Uloupené Kosovo; Serbian: Украдено Косово, romanized: Ukradeno Kosovo) is a 2008 Czech documentary film by director Václav Dvořák and producer Aleš Bednář about events during and following the Kosovo War.

== Plot ==
The documentary describes the situation in Kosovo, first in a short overview of the history of the area, followed by the 1990s conflicts and the 1999 NATO bombing of Yugoslavia and ending with the situation after the Kosovo War. The documentary focuses on 1990s in the time of Slobodan Milošević's rule as well as on numerous interviews of Albanian separatists and Serbian civilians. There were often very brutal scenes. Dvořák often spoke negatively against the Western Powers in the film, especially the Kosovo Force, comparing it to the Munich Agreement.

== Broadcasting and controversy ==
Although the Czech Television (ČT) had been one of the sponsors of the documentary, providing the production with capacities such as editing rooms, it delayed broadcasting it several times, claiming the documentary was "unbalanced" and marked with "pro-Serbian bias", and so "the tone of the documentary could cause negative emotions." Dvořák responded that the same could be said for "Holocaust documentaries, where the Nazi Germany 'side' and 'views' were also appropriately ignored". Václav Dvořák is the chairman of the civic association Friends of Serbs in Kosovo and questions the officially accepted number of victims of the Srebrenica massacre.

The documentary producer, Aleš Bednář, additionally stated that it wasn't ruled out that some viewers could feel it was "unbalanced", but only because they had been "lopsidedly informed about Balkan conflicts through years, above all by television, but by other media as well."

Its first broadcasting, scheduled for 17 March 2008, on the 4th anniversary of the ethnic clashes in Kosovo in 2004, was postponed until April, and it was eventually broadcast with a follow-up show analyzing the Kosovo conflict from the point of view of the Kosovo Albanians. The creators of the documentary published it on YouTube, where it is still available as of June 2015.

Due to the postponement of the allegedly promised premiere date, the film was given the title of "dissident" by the ČT. On 17 February 2009, the first anniversary since the 2008 Kosovo declaration of independence, the Radio Television of Serbia aired Stolen Kosovo at 21:00 Central European Time on its RTS1 channel, preceded by an interview with the director.

The film was criticized for only covering atrocities committed against Serbs such as by the Kosovo Liberation Army, while not doing the same for atrocities committed by the Serbian army, Kosovo Serbs and Bosnian Serbs against Kosovar Albanians, Croats and Bosniaks.
