= Goraždevac murders =

2003 murders in Goraždevac, Kosovo

- Location: 42.6481°N 20.3773°E; Goraždevac, United Nations Administered Kosovo
- Date: 13 August 2003
- Target: Kosovo Serb teenagers
- Attack type: Murder, attempted mass murder
- Deaths: 2
- Injuries: 4
- Perpetrator: Unknown

On 13 August 2003 four ethnic Serbs were wounded and two killed as unknown assailants shot with automatic rifles at a group of mostly children who played and swam by a river in the village of Goraždevac in Kosovo.

== Event ==
A large group of Serb children from the Serb enclave of Goraždevac, close to Peja, gathered on the banks of the river Bistrica. As the children played and swam in the river, automatic rifle shots were fired from the Albanian village of Zahač. 19-year-old Ivan Jovović died instantly, while 13-year-old Pantelija Dakić later died in the hospital. 11-year old Marko Bogićević and 15-year-old Bogdan Bukumirović were seriously injured, while Dragana Srbljak and Đorđe Ugrenović suffered from minor injuries. The killings were reportedly timed to coincide with the return of over 200 Serb refugees into the town.

== Aftermath ==
Two days after the attack, Serbian Prime Minister Zoran Živković attended the funeral service for the two killed teens, with the Serbian government declaring 15 August a day of national mourning. Moreover, it was immediately condemned by the United Nations Interim Administration Mission in Kosovo (UNMIK), Kosovo Force (KFOR), Kosovo Albanian officials, the European Union, Russia, France, Australia and the United States. The perpetrators have still not been identified. In January 2013, during a period of unrest throughout Kosovo, a memorial to the victims was attacked by vandals.

== See also ==
- Gnjilane killings
- Staro Gracko massacre
- 2004 unrest in Kosovo
- List of unsolved murders (2000–present)
- Anti-Serb sentiment
