= Ugljare, Graçanicë =

Village in Kosovo

Uglarë Ugljare
- Village
- Location within Kosovo
- Coordinates: 42.628388°N 21.106662°E
- Country: Kosovo
- District: Pristina
- Municipality: Gracanica

Population (2024)
  - Total: 5,064

Ugljare (Serbian Cyrillic: Угљаре) or Uglara (Albanian: Uglarë), is a village in the Gračanica municipality of Kosovo. Ugljare was part of the Kosovo Polje municipality before the Gračanica Municipality was created.

It is a Serb enclave; it has a supermajority of ethnic Serbs.

Ugljare is located about 5 kilometers from city center of Pristina and 12 kilometers from the Gračanica monastery. There is river passing through the Ugljare, Prištevka.
