= Bac u kry =

Slogan in Kosovo

Bac u kry is an Albanian slogan which was used during Kosovo's independence from Serbia in February 2008. It means "Uncle, it's over".

The slogan was also used on T-shirts, pens and posters. The creators of this phrase say that this symbolizes the independence which many ethnic Albanians dreamt for since the end of the Kosovo War in 1999.

The slogan often accompanies the face of Adem Jashari, an ethnic Albanian commander during the Kosovo War who was killed in action.

== Uses ==
The slogan was used by many. There are billboards which use this phrase. In addition, in downtown Borroramizi (Pallati i Rinisë) there is a flag with exactly the same expression.
