= Roland Bartetzko =

German soldier, paid paramilitary, and author

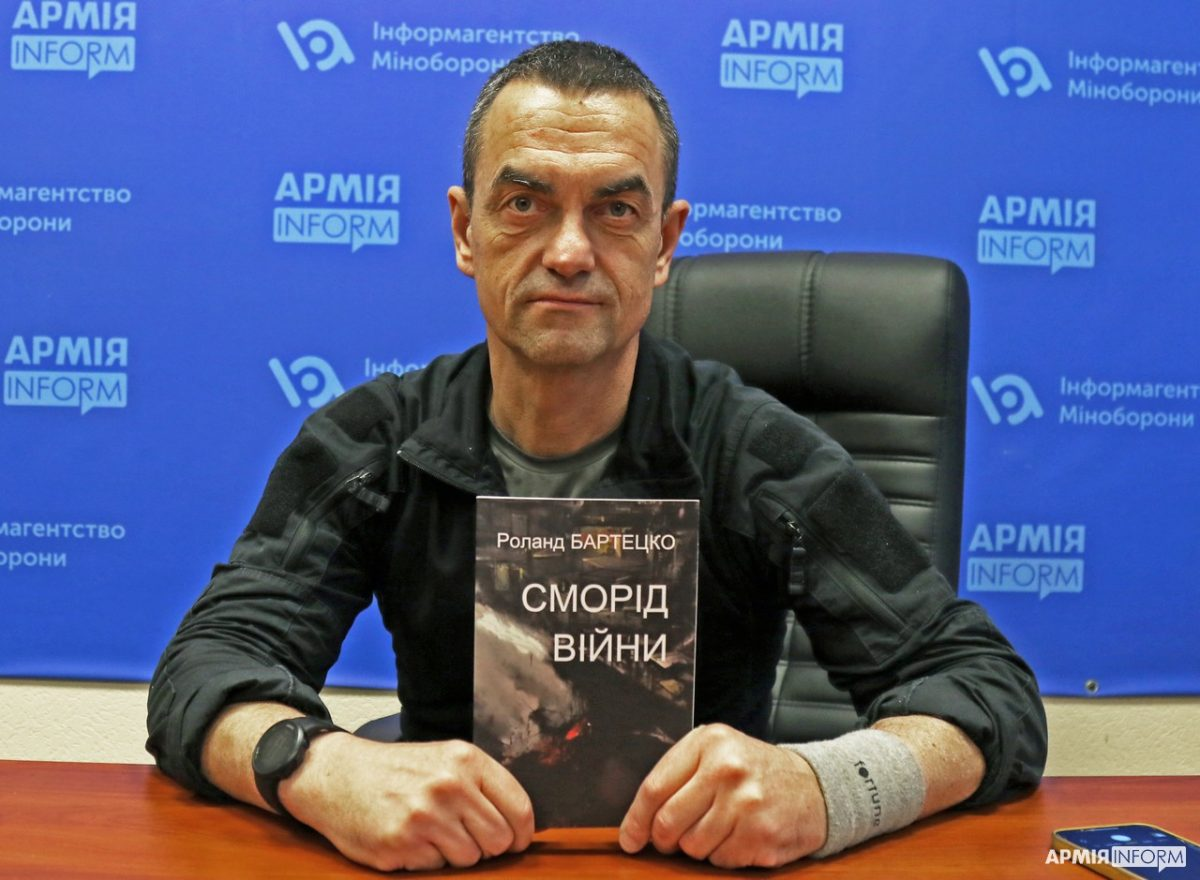
- Born: 1970 (age 55–56); Würselen, West Germany
- Military career
- Allegiance: West Germany; Germany; Herzeg-Bosnia; Kosovo Liberation Army
- Branch: German Army; Croatian Defence Council; Kosovo Liberation Army
- Service years: 1987–1992 (Bundeswehr); 1992–1994 (HVO); 1998–1999 (KLA)
- Rank: Oberfeldwebel
- Nickname: "Shaban"
- Conflicts: Bosnian War; Kosovo War

Roland Bartetzko (born 1970) is a former German soldier and convicted terrorist who fought with the Croatian Defence Council in the Bosnian War (1992–1995) and the Kosovo Liberation Army in the Kosovo War (1998–1999).

In 2001, Bartetzko orchestrated a car bombing outside a Yugoslav government office in Pristina, killing one Serb civilian, and injuring four others. After his fingerprint was found on the detonator, he was arrested and charged with murder, attempted murder and terrorism, becoming the first Westerner to be indicted on these charges in post-war Kosovo.

The following year, he was convicted on all counts by an international court under the supervision of the United Nations Mission in Kosovo (UNMIK), and sentenced to 23 years' imprisonment. Bartetzko's sentence was later commuted to 20 years' imprisonment. He was released on parole in 2015. He has maintained his innocence and claims he was framed by UNMIK. He wrote a book in 2018.

== Early life and the Yugoslav Wars ==
Bartetzko was born in the town of Würselen near Aachen in 1970. He joined the Bundeswehr in 1987. By the time he was dishonorably discharged from the Bundeswehr in 1992, he had reached the rank of staff sergeant (German: Oberfeldwebel). In 1992, he travelled to the Republic of Bosnia and Herzegovina to fight in the Bosnian War, where he joined the Croatian Defence Council (HVO).

"To be able to call myself a soldier, I thought I had to fight, otherwise, I could have joined a paintball club."

— Roland Bartetzko

Bartetzko was one of approximately 100 German citizens who volunteered to fight with the HVO, most of whom were far-right extremists. Bartetzko has denied being a neo-Nazi. He was assigned to the Ante "Bruno" Bušić Brigade, which fought the Army of the Republic of Bosnia and Herzegovina (ARBiH) He also fought during the Siege of Mostar.

Bartetzko left the HVO in April 1994, citing the "very cruel scenes, which could be described as atrocities," as he witnessed being committed by his fellow HVO fighters. He subsequently volunteered to fight with the Croatian Army and participated in Operation Mistral 2 in the closing stages of the Bosnian War. Upon returning to Germany, Bartetzko was arrested for allegedly stealing a woman's handbag. Following the outbreak of the Kosovo War in February 1998, Bartetzko travelled to Tirana, Albania. He subsequently crossed the Albanian–Yugoslav border into Kosovo and joined the Kosovo Liberation Army (KLA) as a volunteer. During his time with the KLA, he assumed the nom de guerre “Shaban” which was easier to be pronounced by the KLA members.

== Terrorism conviction ==
On 18 April 2001, a car bomb exploded near the Centre for Peace and Tolerance in Pristina, the headquarters of the Yugoslav passport office in Kosovo, killing one civilian and wounding four others, including a woman who was left with serious injuries. Yugoslav government official Aleksandar Petrović was later identified as the man killed in the bombing. The device used in the attack was filled with metal fragments. According to the United Nations Interim Administration Mission in Kosovo (UNMIK) spokesperson Andrea Angeli, it contained around 10 kilograms (22 lb) of explosive. "For the future of Kosovo it could not be a more tragic incident," UNMIK police spokesperson Derek Chappell stated. "This is an attack against everything that people trying to build this country are working for."

The crime scene was quickly secured by UNMIK police and British KFOR personnel. UNMIK and KFOR soon discovered the detonator that had been used in the attack and that Bartetzko's fingerprints were on it. Bartetzko was arrested near the scene immediately after the explosion, his clothing, face and hands covered in dirt and dust. He was charged with murder, attempted murder and terrorism. He was the first Westerner to be charged with murder in post-war Kosovo.

In 2001, Bartetzko was discharged from the Bundeswehr under Paragraph 55 (5) of the Soldiers' Act, which is enforced when a soldier has "culpably violated their duty to serve" or "seriously endangered the military order or the reputation of the Bundeswehr". Bartetzko's trial commenced in February 2002; he pleaded not guilty. The trial was held under heavy security, with United Nations police officers wearing ballistic vests and armed with automatic rifles. The prosecution argued that the bombing was a "revenge attack" stemming from Bartetzko's "hatred of Serbs". On 10 May 2002, Bartetzko was convicted on all counts and sentenced to 23 years' imprisonment.

== Imprisonment ==
Bartetzko was incarcerated at the Dubrava Prison in western Kosovo. He filed an appeal against the first-instance verdict, and on 12 November 2002, the Supreme Court of Kosovo reduced his sentence from 23 years to 20 years. In 2009, Bartetzko filed a request for interim measures with the Constitutional Court of Kosovo, alleging violations of his right to effective legal remedy, right to appeal, and human rights guaranteed by the European Convention on Human Rights. In August 2010, the motion was rejected by the Constitutional Court of Kosovo.

== Later life ==
Bartetzko was released on parole in 2015. Upon his release, he relocated to Pristina and found work providing legal services to a local media company, having studied law while imprisoned. In 2018, Bartetzko published a memoir called 'The Smell of War: Lessons from the Battlefield.'

He continues to maintain that he was not responsible for the bombing of the Yugoslav passport office and has accused UNMIK of framing him. In 2022, Bartetzko went to Ukraine to provide logistical support for the Ukrainian war effort amidst the Russian invasion of the country.

== Bibliography ==
- Bartetzko, Roland (January 2018). The Smell of War: Lessons from the Battlefield. SMS Publishing. ISBN 978-9951562355.
