= Goraždevac =

Goraždevac Гораждевац
- Village
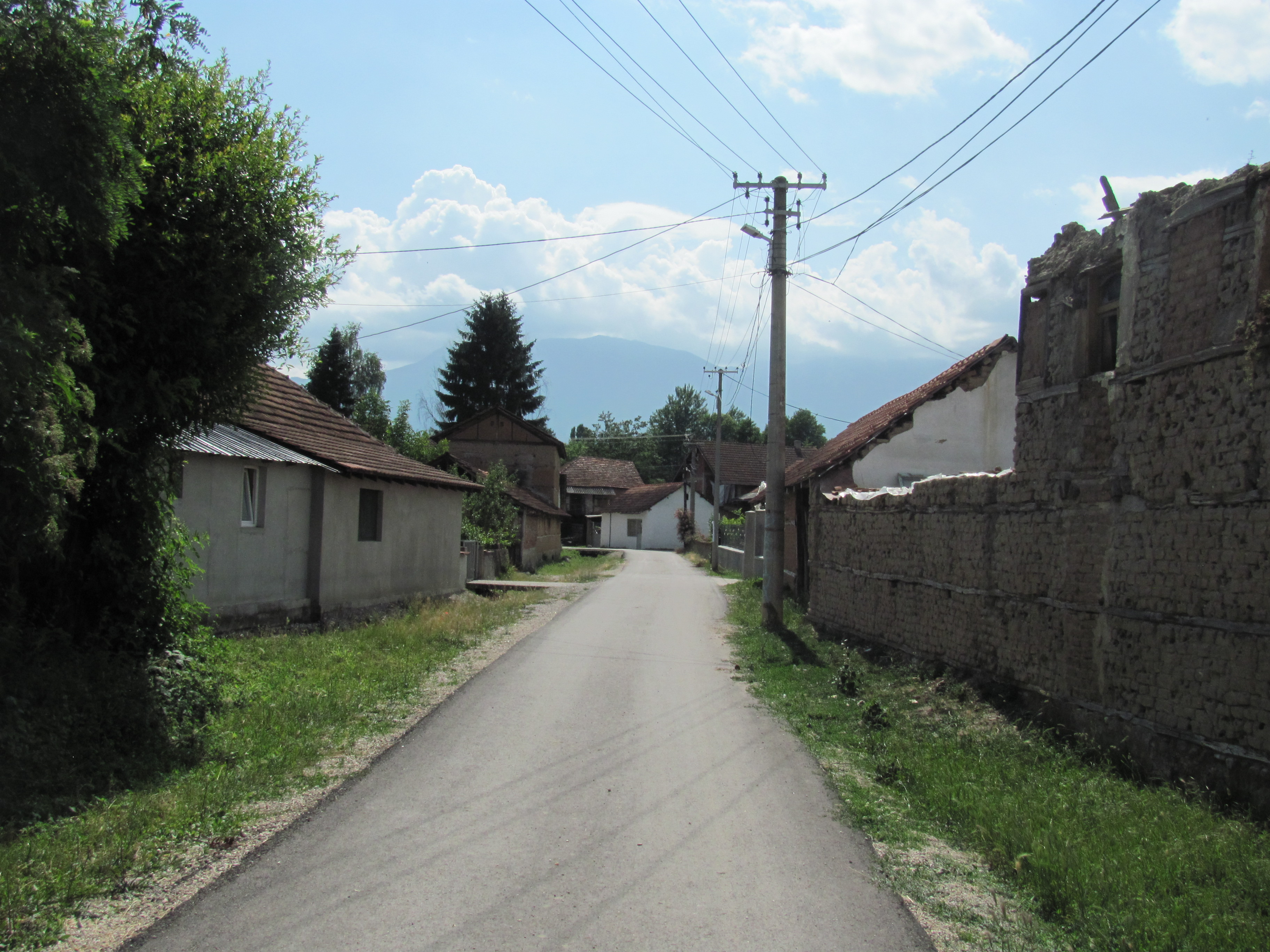

- Location in Kosovo
- Coordinates: 42°38′00″N 20°22′00″E
- Location: Kosovo
- District: Peja
- Municipality: Peja

Population (2024)
  - Total: 1,011
- Time zone: UTC+1 (CET)
  - Summer (DST): UTC+2 (CEST)

Goraždevac (Serbian Cyrillic: Гораждевац, Albanian: Gorazhdevc or Kastrat/Kastrati) is a village near the city of Peja in Kosovo. It has been inhabited since at least the thirteenth century, when it was mentioned in the chrysobull of Stefan Nemanja (or his son, Stefan the First-Crowned).

== History ==
During World War II, 47 Serbs and Montenegrins were killed in the village in 1941 by Albanian paramilitaries. As a Serb-inhabited enclave in a heavily Albanian-inhabited region of western Kosovo, Goraždevac has been the scene of ethnic tensions between the two communities. It was the scene of attacks by the guerilla group, the Kosovo Liberation Army, in the late 1990s as they fought the Serb military forces, accused of committing atrocities against the Albanian population. After the end of the Kosovo War in June 1999, many of its population of around 2,000 Serbs fled attacks by Albanian militants, though some later returned. The population today is said to be around 850 people.

In June 2003, Veselin Besović from Goraždevac was sentenced by an international court in Peja to serve seven years in prison for crimes allegedly committed in the villages of Čuska and Zahać. He has appealed.

According to the 2011 census in Kosovo, the village had 570 people, of whom 255 were Serbs (44.7%), 148 were Albanians (25.9%), 139 Roma and Egyptians (24.4%), 26 Bosniaks (4.6%) and 2 others. The census was partially boycotted by the Serb population.

=== 2003 Goraždevac murders ===
Goraždevac, a village in Kosovo, has faced repeated attacks from unidentified Albanian assailants since the Kosovo War ended. The village is one of several Kosovo Serb enclaves that receive continuous protection from KFOR troops. In August 2003, a 19-year-old Serbian teenager and a 12-year-old boy were killed, with four more children wounded, with fire from automatic rifles, while swimming in the Bistrica near Goraždevac. This attack occurred shortly before 200 Kosovo Serb refugees were set to return to their homes. However, the return plans were abruptly halted due to the incident. The culprits remain unidentified.

== See also ==
- Kosovo Serbian enclaves
