= Serb enclaves in Kosovo =

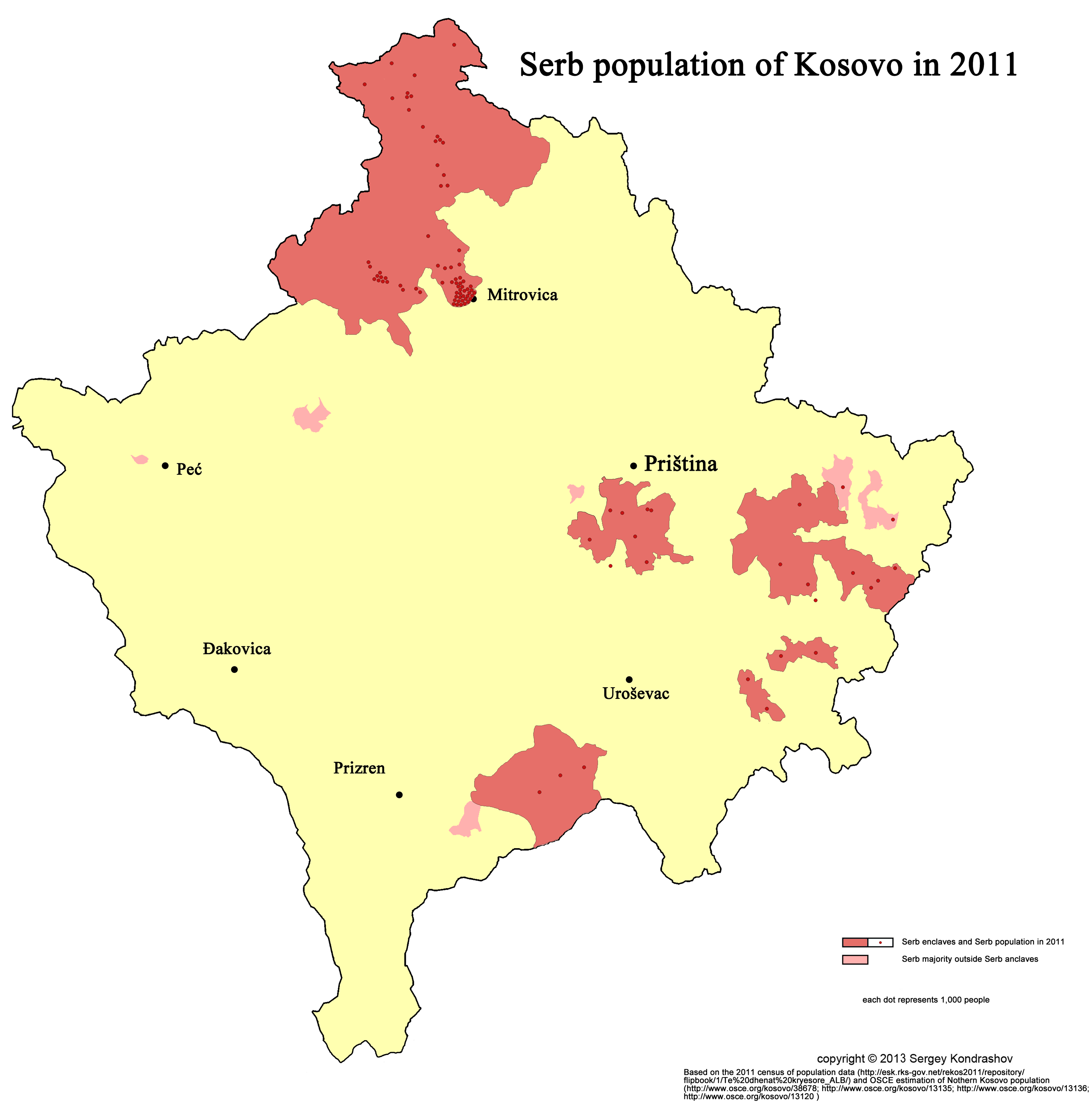
Serb-populated areas in Kosovo

Serb enclaves are Serb settlements in Kosovo situated south of the Ibar river, outside the compact, contiguous territory of North Kosovo, which has an uninterrupted ethnic Serb majority.

== History ==
According to data from the 1991 Yugoslav census, there were five municipalities with a Serb majority in the Autonomous Province of Kosovo and Metohija: Leposavić, Zvečan, Zubin Potok, Štrpce, and Novo Brdo. The remaining municipalities had an Albanian majority, while other significant ethnic minorities (such as ethnic Muslims and Roma) did not form majorities in any of the municipalities.

Before the 1999 Kosovo War, Kosovo had a significantly larger Serbian population. A large number of Serbs fled the province in 1999, with additional departures occurring during the 2004 unrest, when attacks specifically targeted the Serb community and Serbian cultural heritage. During those events, 35 Serbian Orthodox churches—including 18 classified as cultural monuments—were destroyed, burned, or seriously damaged.

Prior to the 1999 Kosovo War, there were many more Serbs living in the territory of Kosovo. Many of them left in 1999, and some more left during the 2004 unrest, when the Serb community and Serbian cultural heritage were targeted, and as a result 35 churches, including 18 monuments of culture, were demolished, burnt or severely damaged. Estimates of the number of Serbs thus displaced range from 65,000 to 250,000 and only around 3,000 have returned. Based on data from Serbian Office for Kosovo and Metohija, 312 of 437 towns and villages in which Serbs lived were completely ethnically cleansed, and in the ensuing violence, more than 1,000 Serbs were killed, while 841 were kidnapped and 960 wounded.

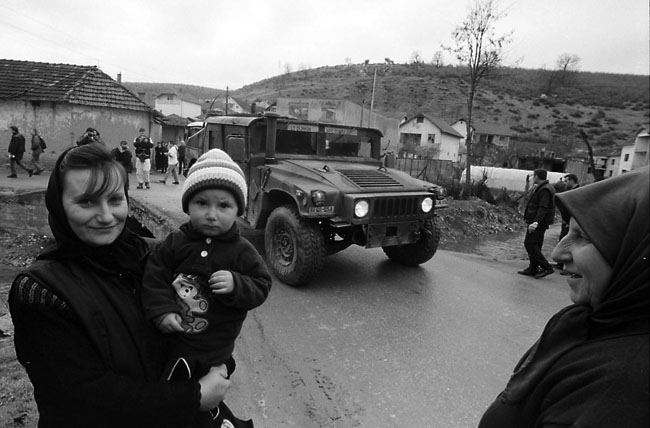
Serbs in enclaves during 2004 unrest

Between 2000 and 2008, the UNMIK administration created eight new municipalities on the territory of Kosovo, three of which have an ethnic Serb majority: Gračanica, Klokot, and Ranilug, while municipalities of Parteš and North Mitrovica were established in 2010 and 2013, respectively.

The 2013 Brussels Agreement allowed full operation of Kosovo Police and customs officials, while the Community of Serb Municipalities is planned to be created within the Republic of Kosovo legal framework.

The Community of Serb Municipalities, which includes all the ten majority-Serb municipalities in Kosovo, was agreed-upon by the 2013 Brussels Agreement with intention to give the Serb community greater autonomy in areas such as education, healthcare, urban planning, and economic development. Its implementation has been continuously derailed and has still not been established due to ongoing disagreements between Kosovo and Serbia over its powers and constitutionality.

== Demographics ==
According to estimates, little more than half of Serbs in Kosovo, c. 50,000 people, live in the enclaves, primarily within Serb-majority municipalities and to a small degree in ethnically isolated villages in Albanian-majority municipalities.

=== Enclave municipalities (Serb-majority municipalities) ===
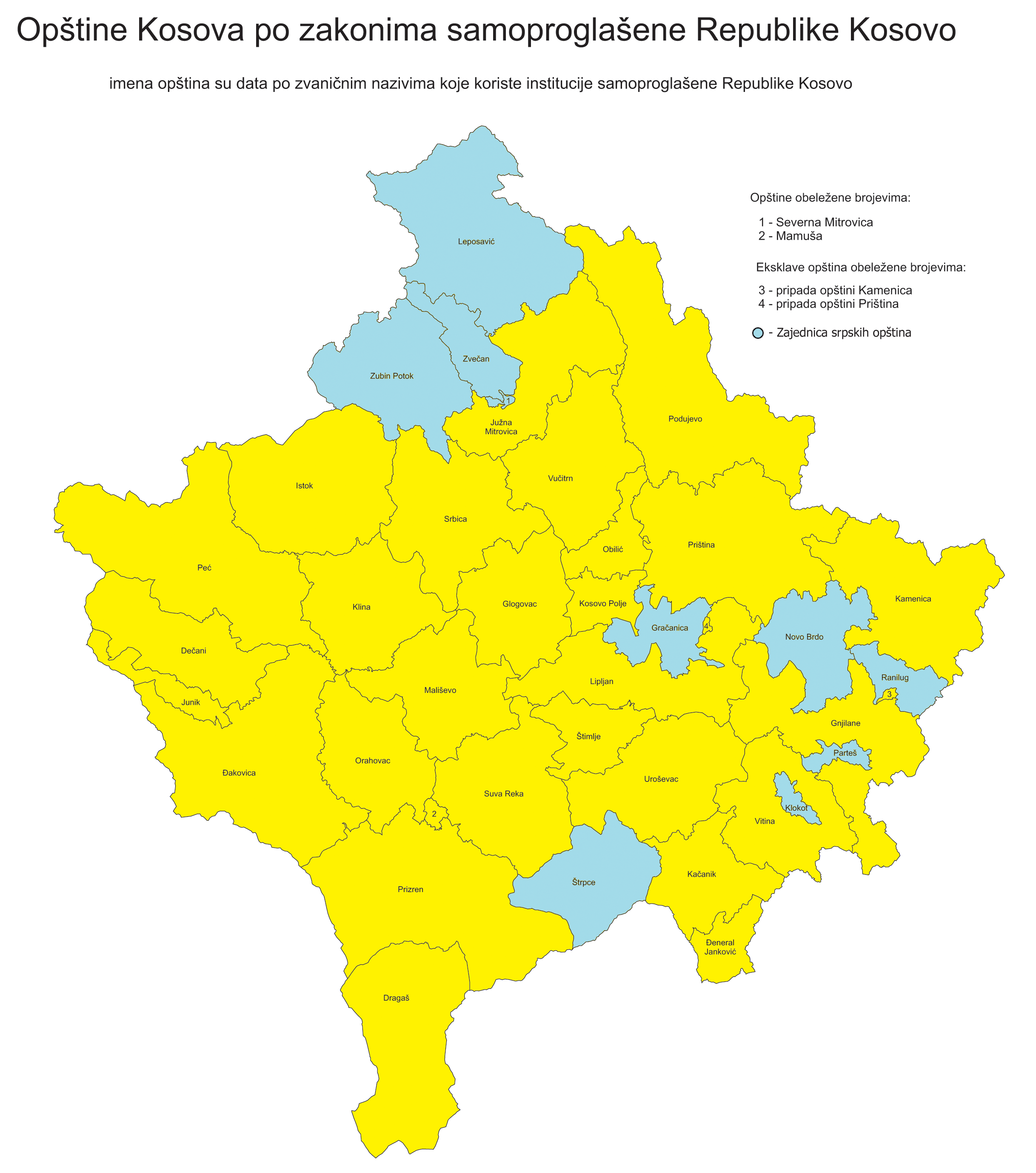
The Community of Serb Municipalities created by the 2013 Brussels Agreement.

According to the 2011 census, which was boycotted in North Kosovo and partially boycotted by Serbs in the enclaves, the enclave municipalities of Gračanica, Parteš, Ranilug, and Štrpce have a Serb ethnic majority, while Serbs form about 45% of the total population of Novo Brdo and Klokot.

=== Enclave villages (in Albanian-majority municipalities) ===
Serb settlements in Albanian-majority municipalities include:

- Peja/Peć municipality: Goraždevac
- Istog/Istok municipality: Osojane
- Rahovec/Orahovac municipality: Hoçë e Madhe/Velika Hoča
- Obiliq/Obilić municipality: no Serb majority settlements anymore while in Plemetina Serbs form a significant minority.
- Vushtrri/Vučitrn municipality: no Serb majority settlements anymore while in Prilužje and Grace Serbs form a significant minority.

== See also ==
- Kosovo Serbs
- Community of Serb Municipalities
- Enclave (film)
