= Çagllavicë =

Village in Kosovo

- Village
- Location within Kosovo
- Coordinates: 42°37′12″N 21°8′49″E
- Country: Kosovo
- District: Pristina
- Municipalities: Pristina

Population (2024)
  - Village: 8,487
- Time zone: UTC+1 (CET)

Çagllavicë (Serbian Cyrillic: Чаглавица) is a village near Pristina, Kosovo.

== History ==
=== 2004 unrest in Kosovo ===
During the unrests in March 2004 that occurred throughout Kosovo, 12000 Kosovo Albanian rioters tried to storm the Serb-populated areas of Çagllavicë. Norwegian and Swedish peacekeepers from KFOR created a blockade by using tear gas, rubber bullets, and stun grenades, in order to keep the two groups apart. A truck was driven by a Kosovo Albanian at full speed towards the barricade in an attempt to penetrate the line. After firing warning shots at the truck, the Norwegians had to use deadly force to avoid friendly casualties, and shot the driver. 16 Norwegian peacekeepers were injured, and 13 of them had to be evacuated. Another KFOR unit consisting of mostly Swedish soldiers also participated in defending Çagllavicë that day, supported by people from the barracks who normally worked with non-military tasks. Lieutenant Colonel Hans Håkansson, who commanded 700 people during the unrest, reported that the fighting went on for 11 hours, and that many collapsed due to dehydration and broken limbs while struggling to fend off waves of rioters. In total, 35 people were injured while defending the town. Hans Håkansson was awarded with a medal for his actions by the Royal Swedish Academy of War Sciences in 2005.
