= Figueira =

Figueira may refer to:

== Places ==
=== Brazil ===
- Figueira, Paraná

=== Cape Verde ===
- Figueira Pavão, Fogo Island
- Figueira (Maio), Maio Island
- Figueira da Naus, Santiago Island

=== Portugal ===
- Figueira da Foz, a city and municipality in the district of Coimbra
- Figueira de Castelo Rodrigo, a municipality in the district of Guarda
- Figueira (Faro), a village in the municipality of Faro
- Figueira, a civil parish in the municipality of Lamego
- Figueira, a civil parish in the municipality of Penafiel
- Figueira (Proença a Nova), a village in the civil parish of Sobreira Formosa

== People ==
- Daniel Figueira (born 1998), a Portuguese footballer
- Diogo da Rocha Figueira (born 1860s), Brazilian serial killer
- Edmar Figueira (born 1984), a Brazilian footballer
- Gilberto Figueira, nicknamed Uaué, (born 1988), an Angolan handball player
- Guilhem Figueira, Languedocian jongleur and troubadour of XIII century
- José Figueira, (born 1982), an English-Spanish football manager
- Manuel Figueira (born 1938), a Cape Verdean artist
- Maria Luisa Figueira (born 1944), a Portuguese psychiatrist
- Maria Tomásia Figueira Lima (1826-1902), Brazilian aristocrat, abolitionist
- Nayara Figueira (born 9 June 1988), a Brazilian synchronized swimmer.
- Roberto Horcades Figueira (born 1947), a Brazilian cardiologist
- Tchalé Figueira (born 1953), a Cape Verdean artist
- Tony Figueira (footballer) (born 1981 as José Antonio Pestana Figueira), a Venezuela-born Portuguese footballer
- Tony Figueira (photographer) (1959–2017), a Namibian photographer
- Walter Figueira (born 1995), English footballer

== Other uses ==
- Fig tree, the literal translation of Portuguese "figueira".
