= Tony Figueira =

Tony Figueira may refer to:

- Tony Figueira (footballer) (born 1981), Portuguese football player
- Tony Figueira (photographer), Namibian photographer
