= Rodrigo Tavares =

Portuguese financial professional, scholar, and public administrator

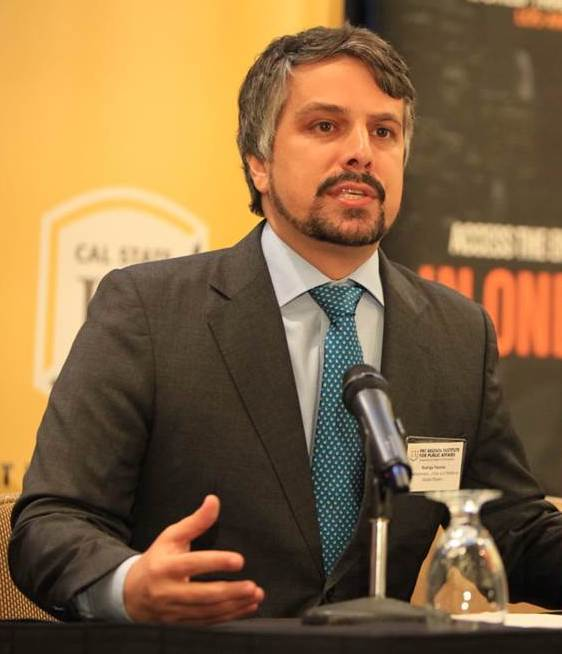
- "Free Connected Minds" Conference, Beirut, 2016
- Born: Rodrigo Marques Tavares; December 26, 1978 (age 47); Lisbon, Portugal
- Education: Harvard University, Columbia University, University of California, Berkeley, University of Gothenburg
- Spouse: Mirna Queiroz
- Scientific career
- Fields: Sustainability, Finance, International Relations

Rodrigo Marques Tavares (Lisbon, December 26, 1978) is a Portuguese scholar, financial market professional, and public administrator. He is a full professor (adjunct) at the NOVA School of Business and Economics (Nova SBE) and the founder and CEO of Granito Group, a financial group dedicated to the advancement of the sustainable economy. In 2017, he was named a Young Global Leader by the World Economic Forum. He is a columnist for Folha de S.Paulo and Expresso, and a commentator on TSF radio.

== Education and academic work ==
Born in Lisbon, Portugal, and with parents from the municipality of Proença-a-Nova, it was in the city of Castelo Branco that Tavares spent his youth, having completed secondary education at Escola Secundária Nuno Álvares. After graduating in International Relations at NOVA University Lisbon, he completed his PhD in Peace and Development Studies in 2006 at the University of Gothenburg, School of Global Studies. He was the first Portuguese person to obtain a doctorate in Peace and Conflict Studies. His thesis Understanding Regional Peace and Security: A New Framework for Analysis was supervised by Professor Emeritus Björn Hettne and Associate Professor Fredrik Söderbaum. Tavares discovered Björn Hettne's academic work as an undergraduate student and traveled to Sweden to meet him in person and persuade him to be his doctoral supervisor.

While working on his thesis and after publishing his first scientific articles, Tavares was invited to the University of California at Berkeley as a visiting scholar in the Department of International and Area Studies. He lived in California in 2003 and 2004.

In 2010, Tavares returned to the United States to carry out post-doctoral research at Columbia University, at the School of International and Public Affairs, under the supervision of professor emeritus of economics Albert Fishlow and with a post-doctoral fellowship granted by the Foundation for Science and Technology. He wrote the book Security in South America during this period (Lynne Rienner, 2014).

After serving in the government of the state of São Paulo, Tavares moved to Boston to work as a senior researcher at Harvard University, at the Kennedy School of Government, on topics focused on the global competitiveness of cities (2014-2015). He wrote the book Paradiplomacy: Cities and States as Global Players (Oxford University Press, 2016) during this period.

He also worked at the United Nations University, the UN think tank, in Belgium and Ethiopia for five years. As a researcher, he coordinated applied research work on regional integration, security, and development in Africa. He was also a professor at the MBA in International Relations at Fundação Getúlio Vargas (FGV) in Brazil between 2013 and 2018.

He is currently a full professor (adjunct) at NOVA University Lisbon, at the School of Business and Economics (Nova SBE), where he teaches courses in sustainable finance and corporate sustainability In 2024 Nova SBE's Master's in Finance has been ranked 7th worldwide by the Financial Times.

Rodrigo Tavares' academic work has focused on finding innovative solutions in the fields of international relations, finance, and sustainable development. In particular, his publications are focused on exploring new forms of political, economic, and financial governance. He began his career evaluating the social, economic, and security impacts of regional integration and supranational organizations. Subsequently, his research focused on local governments (cities, states, and provinces) and their ability to become global actors, known as paradiplomacy. Currently, Tavares studies the connections between the financial market, society, and the environment.

He has been described as "one of those rare diplomacy experts who combine the scientific rigor of an academic with the serious experience of a foreign policy professional" and as "one of the world's leading experts in sustainable finance" (Grupo Globo).

His most recognized publications are:

=== Books ===
- A Palavra e o Poder: Uma Travessia Crítica por 40 Anos de Democracia Brasileira (Civilização Brasileira, Record, 2025), with Flavia Lima e Naief Haddad [Word and Power: A Critical Journey Through Forty Years of Brazilian Democracy — original in Portuguese]
- Paradiplomacy: Cities and States as Global Players (Oxford University Press, 2016)
- Security in South America (Lynne Rienner, 2014)
- Regional Organizations in African Security (Routledge, 2011, with Fredrik Söderbaum)
- Regional Security (Routledge, 2010)

=== Peer-reviewed articles ===
- ESG-Financial Performance in the Gulf Region: A Bidirectional Examination in Sustainable Communities, 2025, Vol. 2 (1) (with Stefanescu-Cuntze, C., & Sá, C.)
- ESG Factors and Risk-Adjusted Performance: a New Quantitative Model in Journal of Sustainable Finance & Investment, 2016, Vol. 6 (4), p. 292-300 (with N. C. Ashwin Kumar, Camille Smith, Leïla Badis, Nan Wang, and Paz Ambrosy)
- Foreign Policy Goes Local in Foreign Affairs, October 2013
- Resolving the Kashmir Conflict: India, Pakistan, Kashmiris and Religious Militants in Asian Journal of Political Science, 2008, Vol. 16 (3), p. 276-302 (first peace proposal for Kashmir published in an indexed academic journal)
- The Participation of SADC and ECOWAS in Military Operations: The Weight of National Interests in Decision-Making in African Studies Review, 2011, 54 (2), p.145-176

== Granito Group ==
The Granito Group is a global financial group dedicated to advancing the sustainable economy. Targeted at financial institutions, it provides strategic consultancy, financial advisory, and research & policy services. The vision to create the Granito Group occurred when Tavares was a senior researcher at Harvard University and noticed that the bridges between financial markets and society, or between financial resources and sustainability, could be stronger and more sophisticated. The consulting firm Granito & Partners, the embryo of the Granito Group, was founded in 2015 by Tavares.

In 2021, it was announced that Tavares had been selected by the British government and the City of London to lead a global initiative that aimed to create the first classification system (technical standard) for responsible and sustainable investment funds.

In the same year, he led the working group created by oil-company Galp to produce all technical studies relating to the future of the Matosinhos refinery, integrated in the context of the energy transition. The group was made up of external experts and company executives. After finishing its mandate, the group was replaced in 2022 by an executive committee whose objective is to develop the entire urban requalification project. The group proposed that the refinery site be used to create a sustainable innovation district, one of the largest in Europe.

== Public sector ==
In 2011–2014, he served as head of the Office of International Affairs of the government of the state of São Paulo (during Geraldo Alckmin's government) (currently the Secretariat for International Relations). During his tenure, the state of São Paulo was recognized by the press and the international diplomatic community as one of the most influential and active subnational governments globally. During this period, the Brazilian state received 1,595 foreign delegations, including 22 heads of state and government, organized 230 missions abroad, signed 234 international agreements, managed 150 international cooperation programs and projects, organized 104 international events, and maintained relations with 116 countries. Tavares was the youngest and the first foreigner to lead the state of São Paulo's external relations.

In 2008–2010, he was invited by the United Nations Secretariat to write Secretary-General Ban Ki-moon's annual reports on Africa's development, which were presented to the General Assembly. The reports monitored the implementation of several commitments made by the international community, identified challenges, and presented the way forward. They also proposed the establishment of a new permanent United Nations monitoring mechanism to be led by the UN Office of the Special Advisor on Africa (OSAA). He was one of the youngest UN writers in the organization's history. Tavares was also a consultant for other UN agencies (FAO, United Nations University) and the Swedish Armed Forces, where he presented future scenarios for Africa in the areas of security and development.

== Media ==
Tavares is a columnist for Expresso and Folha de S.Paulo where he writes about economics, finance, technology, public policies, and sustainability. He is also a weekly commentator on TSF radio. He also writes regularly for the World Economic Forum's Agenda and Quartz. He was a columnist at TSF online, where he wrote biweekly about his home country, Portugal (2018–2020). He also wrote regularly for Family Capital, the Brazilian magazine Época, and Visão magazine (where he contributed from 2006 to 2016). Tavares was interviewed or wrote opinion articles in outlets such as CNBC, Financial Times, Fortune, The Economist, Forbes, LSE Business Review, Pensions & Investments, MIT Technology Review, CPAC, Estado de São Paulo, Diário de Notícias, Negócios, Antena 1, Público, Valor Econômico, Tampa Bay Times, Arab News, Boston Business Journal, among others.

In 2021, the World Economic Forum began publishing a series of exclusive articles with concrete proposals to make the world more fair, prosperous, and sustainable. Tavares was the project's curator and the authors included heads of state and government such as Sanna Marin and Alexander De Croo, business leaders, and renowned intellectuals. The series, with around 20 articles published over a year, was also supported by Project Syndicate.

== Awards and recognition ==
- In 2018, he was appointed ambassador of StartUp Portugal, the agency responsible for the global promotion of the Portuguese innovation ecosystem, together with Vhils, Maria Mota and Miguel Pina Martins.
- In 2017, he was named a Young Global Leader by the World Economic Forum.
- In 2011, he was one of seven people selected by the Quebec government as a young leader for his influence on foreign policy.
- Tavares has received scholarships from a wide range of institutions, such as the Foundation for Science and Technology (Ph.D. and postdoc) or the Swedish International Development Agency.

== Personal ==
He is the great-great-grandnephew of Sebastião José Pereira (1857-1925), bishop of Daman and bishop-prelate of Mozambique, buried in the Basilica of Our Lady of the Mount, in Mumbai.
