= Parliamentary delegation =

Official visit abroad by members of a legislature

A parliamentary delegation (or congressional delegation, also CODEL or codel, in the United States) is an official visit abroad by a member or members of a legislature.

To schedule a parliamentary delegation, a member must apply to the relevant committee chair, who will contact the appropriate agency to request funds and support for the trip. Various parliaments and legislatures maintain formal or informal groupings, such as congressional caucuses and all-party parliamentary groups, which maintain regular delegations to and from select countries; the European Parliament also maintains a formal delegation system for regular meetings with national and multinational parliaments.

Parliamentary delegations are formed for purposes of solidarity, negotiations, research, and investigation, but they are sometimes a source of controversy and criticism, when seen as junkets.

== In the United States ==
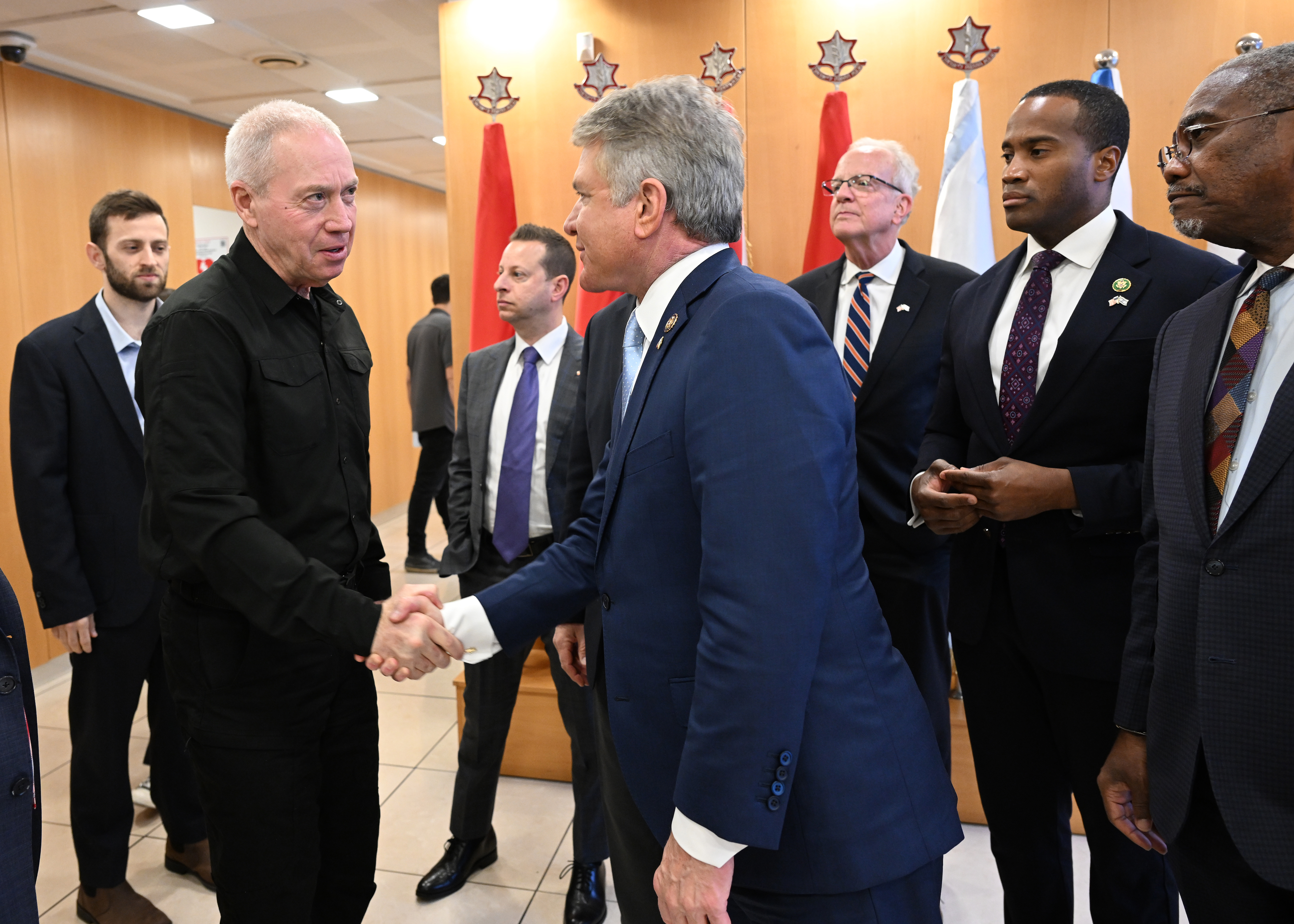
Members of the US Congressional Delegation to Israel with Israeli Defense Minister Yoav Gallant, November 12, 2023

A congressional delegation abroad is not the same as the congressional delegation of a state (or a legislative delegation from a county to a state legislature), which is the entire body of current members elected to both houses of Congress from a specific state.

== See also ==
- Paradiplomacy
