= Sister city =

Agreement between geographical entities

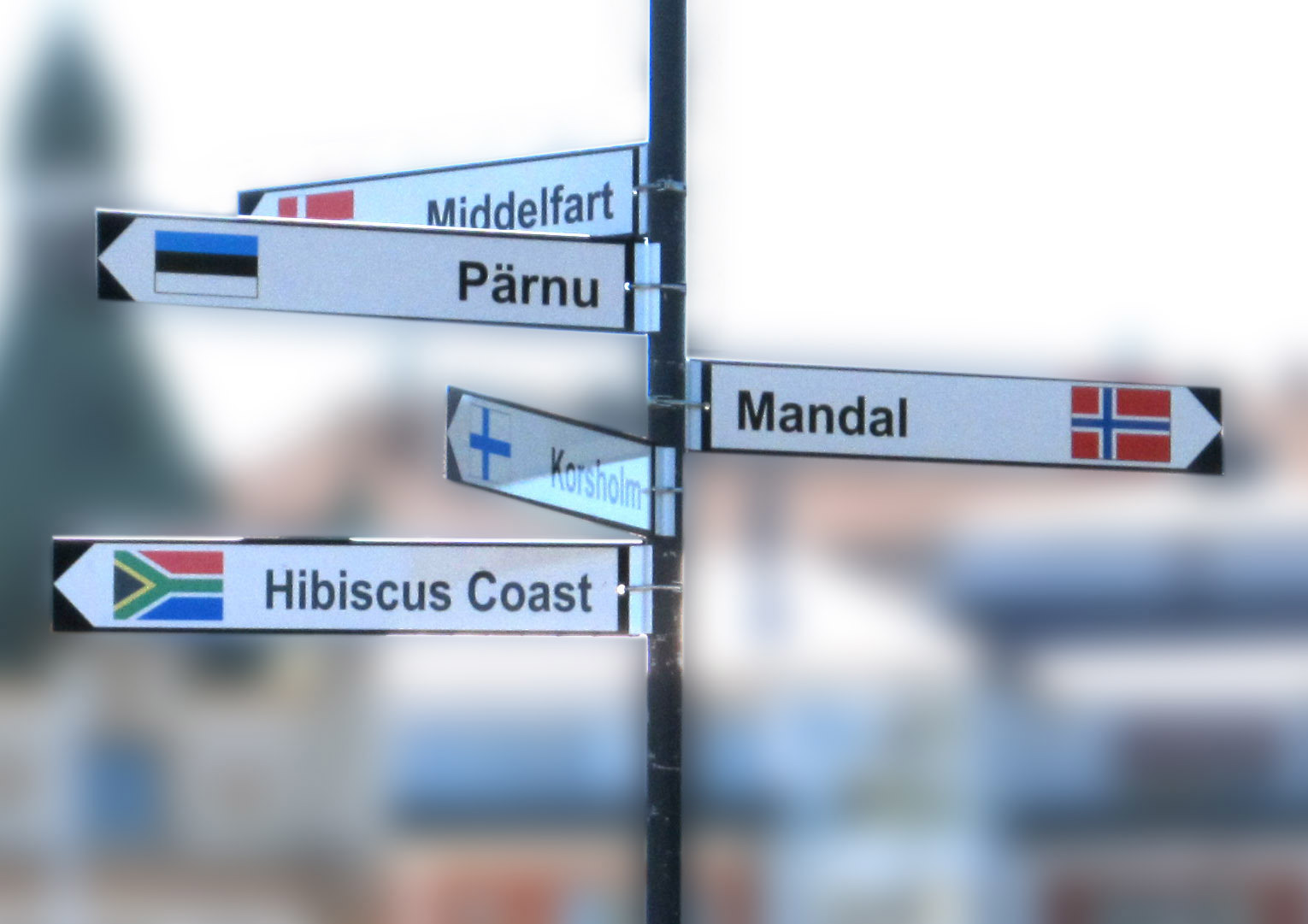
Fingerposts in Oskarshamn, Sweden, showing the direction from the post to each of the city's twin towns

A sister city or a twin town relationship is a form of legal or social agreement between two geographically and politically distinct localities for the purpose of promoting cultural and commercial ties. While there are early examples of international links between municipalities akin to what are known as sister cities dating back to the 9th century, the modern concept was established and adopted worldwide during World War II.

== Origins of the modern concept ==
Throughout history, many cities have participated in various cultural exchanges and similar activities that might resemble a sister-city or twin-city relationship, but the first officially documented case of such a relationship was a signed agreement between the leaders of the cities of Toledo, United States, and Toledo, Spain, in 1931. However, the modern concept of town twinning appeared during the Second World War. More specifically, it was inspired by the bombing of Coventry on 14 November 1940, known as the Coventry Blitz. Conceived by the then Mayor of Coventry, Alfred Robert Grindlay, culminating in a telegram to the people of Stalingrad (now Volgograd) in 1942, the idea emerged as a way of establishing solidarity links between cities in allied countries that went through similar devastating events.

The comradeship between the two cities continued, when again in response to the Battle of Stalingrad, 830 women in Coventry – led by the subsequent Mayor Emily Smith – had their names embroidered on a tablecloth along with the words "Little help is better than a lot of pity" and sent it, along with money (each donated six pence), to the people of Stalingrad. The tablecloth can be seen at the Panorama Museum of the Battle of Stalingrad. The twinning between Coventry and Stalingrad was formalized in 1944 and, after the end of the war, similar links were established to foster friendship and understanding among former foes as an act of peace and reconciliation, with new twinnings between Coventry and German cities: Kiel as early as in 1947 and Dresden in 1956. In 1957, Coventry was officially twinned with Belgrade, even though the link actually dates back to 1953 when then Yugoslav Ambassador visited Coventry and offered a gift of timber from his native country for use in the new Civic Theatre, which when finished was named Belgrade Theatre. The purpose of twinnings was then expanded to encourage trade and tourism. or to reflect other links, such as towns sharing the same name or migration links. By the 2000s, town twinning may include localities of any scope such as villages, prefectures, or countries, and became increasingly used to form strategic international business links among member cities.

== Terminology ==
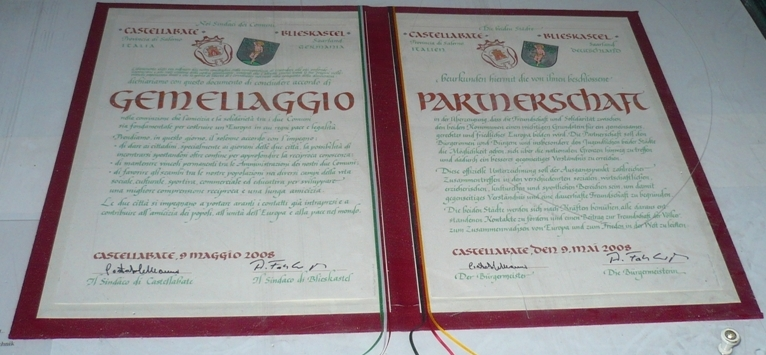
A sample twinning agreement (between Castellabate, Italy (left) and Blieskastel, Germany (right))

In the United Kingdom, the term "twin towns" is most commonly used; the term "sister cities" is generally used for agreements with towns and cities in the Americas. In mainland Europe, the most commonly used terms are "twin towns", "partnership towns", "partner towns", and "friendship towns". The European Commission uses the term "twinned towns" and refers to the process as "town twinning". Spain uses the term "ciudades hermanadas", which means "sister cities". Germany, Poland, and the Czech Republic each use Partnerstadt (German), miasto partnerskie (Polish) and partnerské město (Czech), which translate as "partner town" or "partner city". France uses ville jumelée (jumelage, twinned town or city), and Italy has gemellaggio (twinning) and comune gemellato (twinned municipality). In the Netherlands, the term is jumelage, partnerstad or stedenband ("city bond" when providing mutual support). In Greece, the word αδελφοποίηση (adelphopiisi – fraternisation) has been adopted. In Iceland, the terms vinabæir (friend towns) and vinaborgir (friend cities) are used. In the former Soviet Bloc, "twin towns" and "twin cities" were used; in Russian, they use города-побратимы (sworn brother cities).

The Americas, South Asia, and Australasia use the term "sister cities" or "twin cities". In China, the term is 友好城市 (yǒuhǎo chéngshì – friendly cities). Sometimes, other government bodies enter into a twinning relationship, such as the agreement between the provinces of Hainan in China and Jeju in South Korea. The Douzelage is a town twinning association with one town from each of the member states of the European Union. Although the term is often used interchangeably with the term "friendship city", this may mean a relationship with a more limited scope in comparison to a sister city relationship, and friendship city relationships are mayor-to-mayor agreements.

=== City diplomacy ===
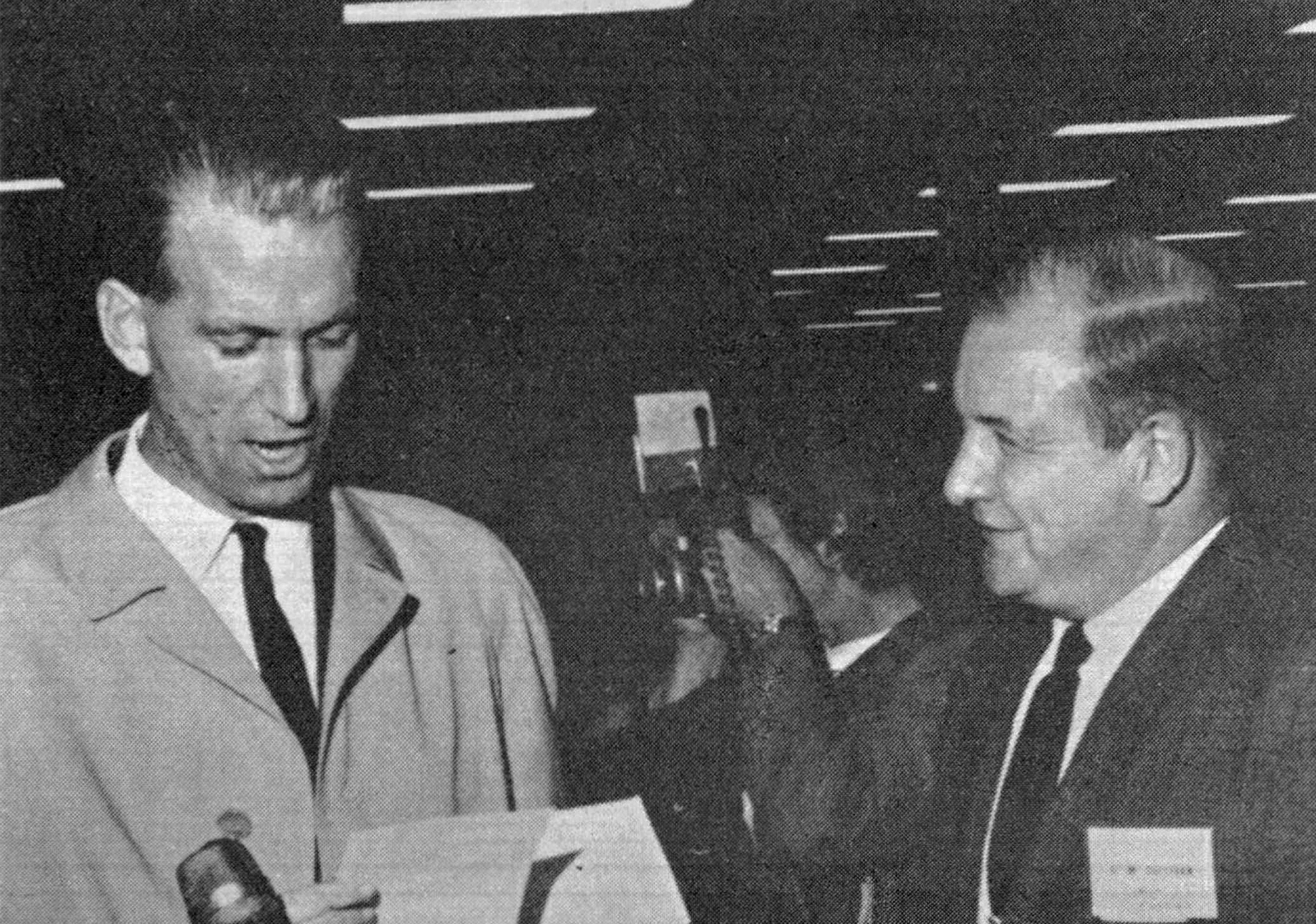
From left, mayors Kåre Nordgård of Tromsø and George M. Sullivan of Anchorage, Alaska meet in September 1969 to kick off their sister city relationship.

City diplomacy is a form of paradiplomacy that involves discussions between officials and residents of different cities. Often these cities will be located in different countries. As such, city diplomacy involves a sort of international relations that works in parallel to the conventional system involving embassies, ambassadors, and treaties negotiated at the level of nation states. According to Rodrigo Tavares, the earliest formal attempts to establish city diplomacy across national boundaries took place in the 19th century. Only a handful of cities were involved in the 19th-century efforts; it was not until the turn of the millennium that it became much more common. The first priority of those carrying out city diplomacy typically overlaps with the core aims of municipal government – improving the lives of local residents. Yet they will often collaborate with peers in other cities to work on issues of planet-wide concern, such as efforts to address climate change.

The phrase "city diplomacy" is formally used in the workings of the United Cities and Local Governments and the C40 Cities Climate Leadership Group, and is recognised by the USC Center on Public Diplomacy. A March 2014 debate in the British House of Lords acknowledged the evolution of town twinning into city diplomacy, particularly in matters of trade and tourism, but also in culture and post-conflict reconciliation. The importance of cities developing "their own foreign economic policies on trade, foreign investment, tourism and attracting foreign talent" has also been highlighted by the World Economic Forum. In addition to C40, other organisations facilitating city diplomacy include the World Cities Summit, City Mayors Foundation, the Smart City Expo World Congress, the Strong City Network and 100 Resilient Cities. As of 2016, there were over 125 such multilateral networks and forums to facilitate international collaboration between different municipal authorities. A Bill introduced in the 2019 session of the US Congress would have legislated for a City and State Diplomacy Act to create a new Office of Subnational Diplomacy at the Department of State ( H.R.3571 - City and State Diplomacy Act]). In the 2020s, the field of city diplomacy has taken a step beyond city-to-city exchanges to target the facilitation of dialogue between cities and multilateral organs, such as the United Nations.

=== Twinning beyond cities and towns ===
Not only cities and towns, but also provinces, states, territories, and regions enter into twinning agreements. For example, the Canadian province of Alberta has "sister province" agreements with Gangwon, South Korea (since 1974), Hokkaido, Japan (since 1980), Heilongjiang, China (1981), Jalisco, Mexico (1999), Ivano-Frankivsk, Ukraine (2004), Lviv, Ukraine (2005), Guangdong, China (2017), and California, United States (2018), as well as policy-oriented (as opposed to economic and cultural) agreements with Nevada, United States (since 2013), Missouri, United States (2015), and Texas, United States (2018). The province of Punjab in Pakistan and California are another such pair, having signed a "sister province" agreement in 2023 for the promotion of economic and cultural relations.

== By continent ==
=== Europe ===
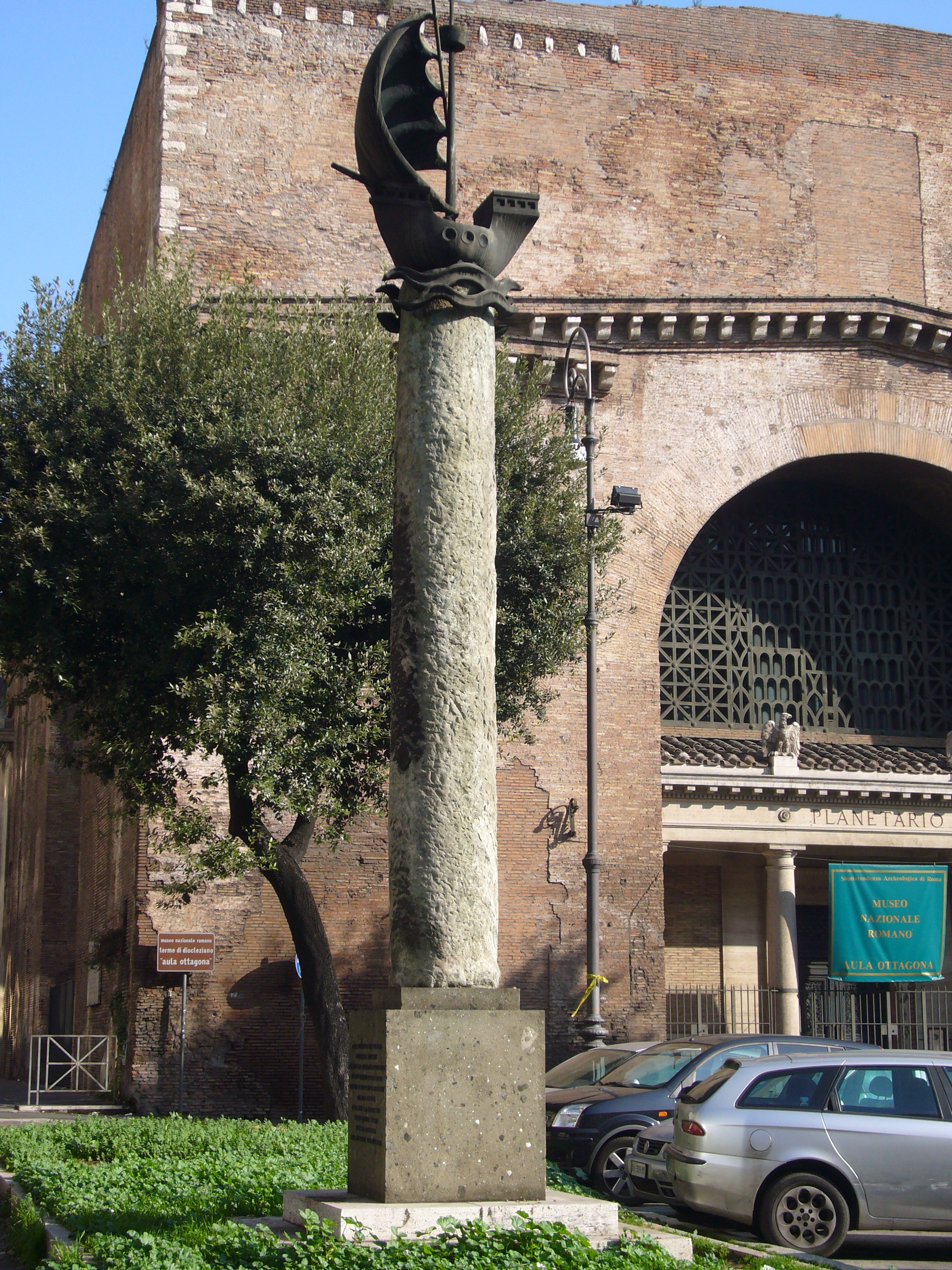
Column dedicated to Paris in Rome, Italy

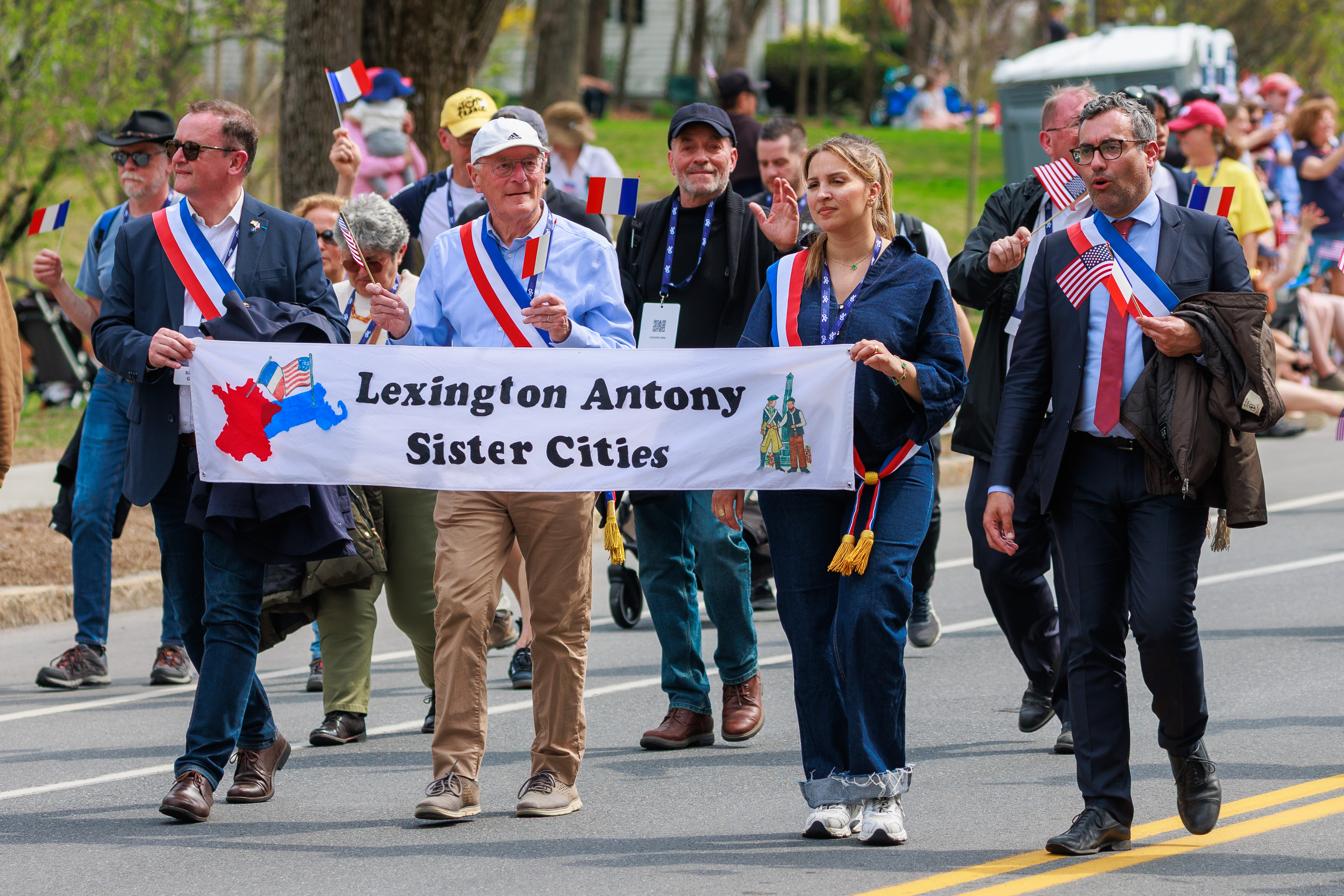
Dignitaries from Antony, France attended a parade in twin city Lexington, Massachusetts, USA

The earliest known town twinning in Europe was between Paderborn, Germany, and Le Mans, France, in 836. Starting in 1905, Keighley in West Yorkshire, England, had a twinning arrangement with French communities Suresnes and Puteaux. The first recorded modern twinning agreement was between Keighley and Poix-du-Nord in Nord, France, in 1920 following the end of the World War I. This was initially referred to as an adoption of the French town; formal twinning charters were not exchanged until 1986.

The practice was continued after the Second World War as a way to promote mutual understanding and cross-border projects of mutual benefit. For example, Coventry twinned with Stalingrad and later with Dresden as an act of peace and reconciliation, all three cities having been heavily bombed during the war. The city of Bath formed an "Alkmaar Adoption committee" in March 1945, when the Dutch city was still occupied by the German Army in the final months of the war, and children from each city took part in exchanges in 1945 and 1946. Similarly, in 1947, Bristol Corporation (later Bristol City Council) sent five "leading citizens" on a goodwill mission to Hanover. Reading in 1947 was the first British town to form links with a former "enemy" city – Düsseldorf, a link that still exists. Since 9 April 1956 Rome and Paris have been exclusively and reciprocally twinned with each other, following the motto: "Only Paris is worthy of Rome; only Rome is worthy of Paris."

Within Europe, town twinning is supported by the European Union. The support scheme was established in 1989. In 2003 an annual budget of about €12 million was allocated to about 1,300 projects. The Council of European Municipalities and Regions also works closely with the commission (DG Education and Culture) to promote modern, high quality twinning initiatives and exchanges that involve all sections of the community. It has launched a website dedicated to town twinning. As of 1995, the European Union had more than 7,000 bilateral relationships involving almost 10,000 European municipalities, primarily French (2837 twinnings) and German (2485 twinnings).

Mural paintings in Sutton, Greater London

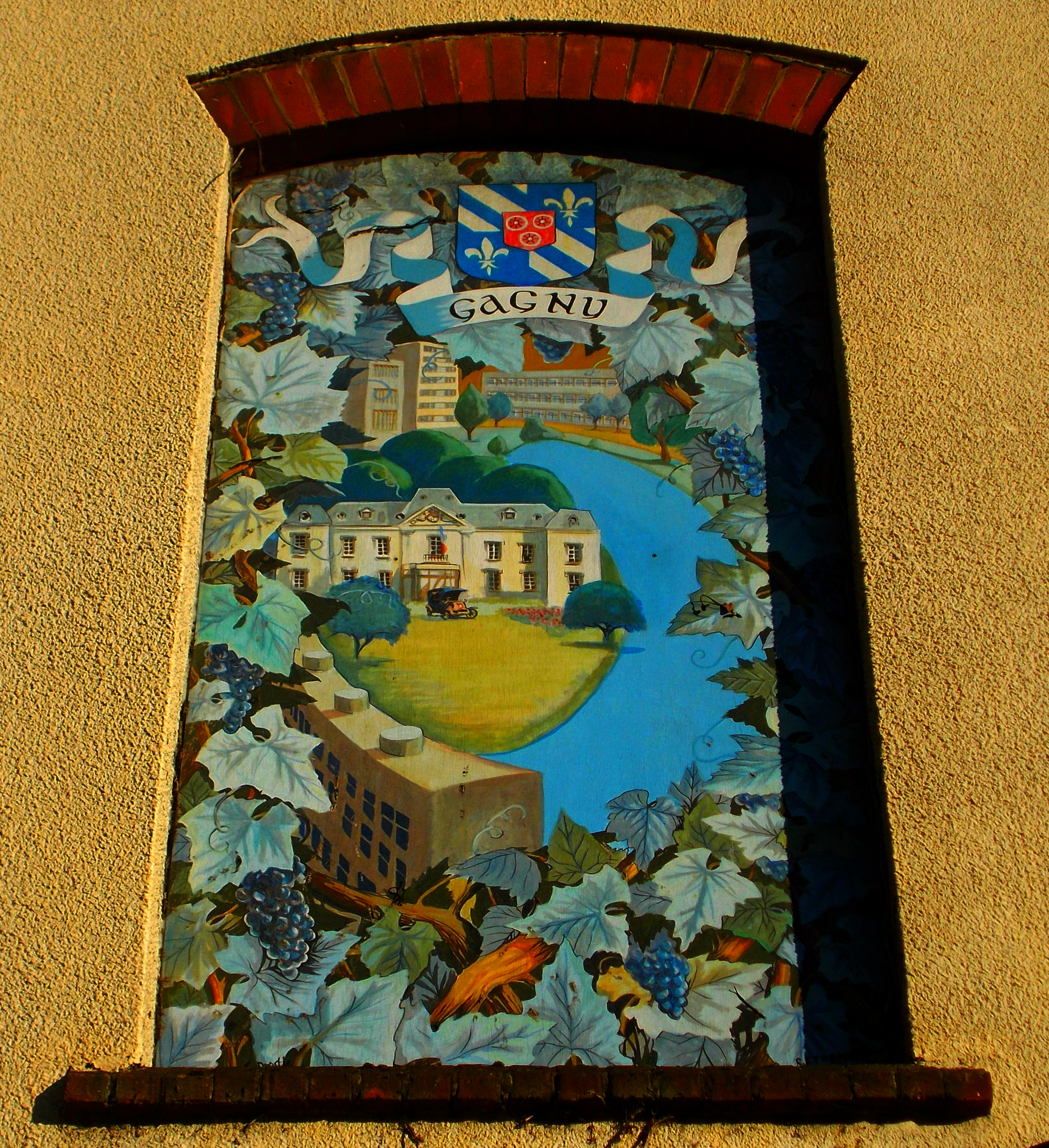
The painting of Gagny

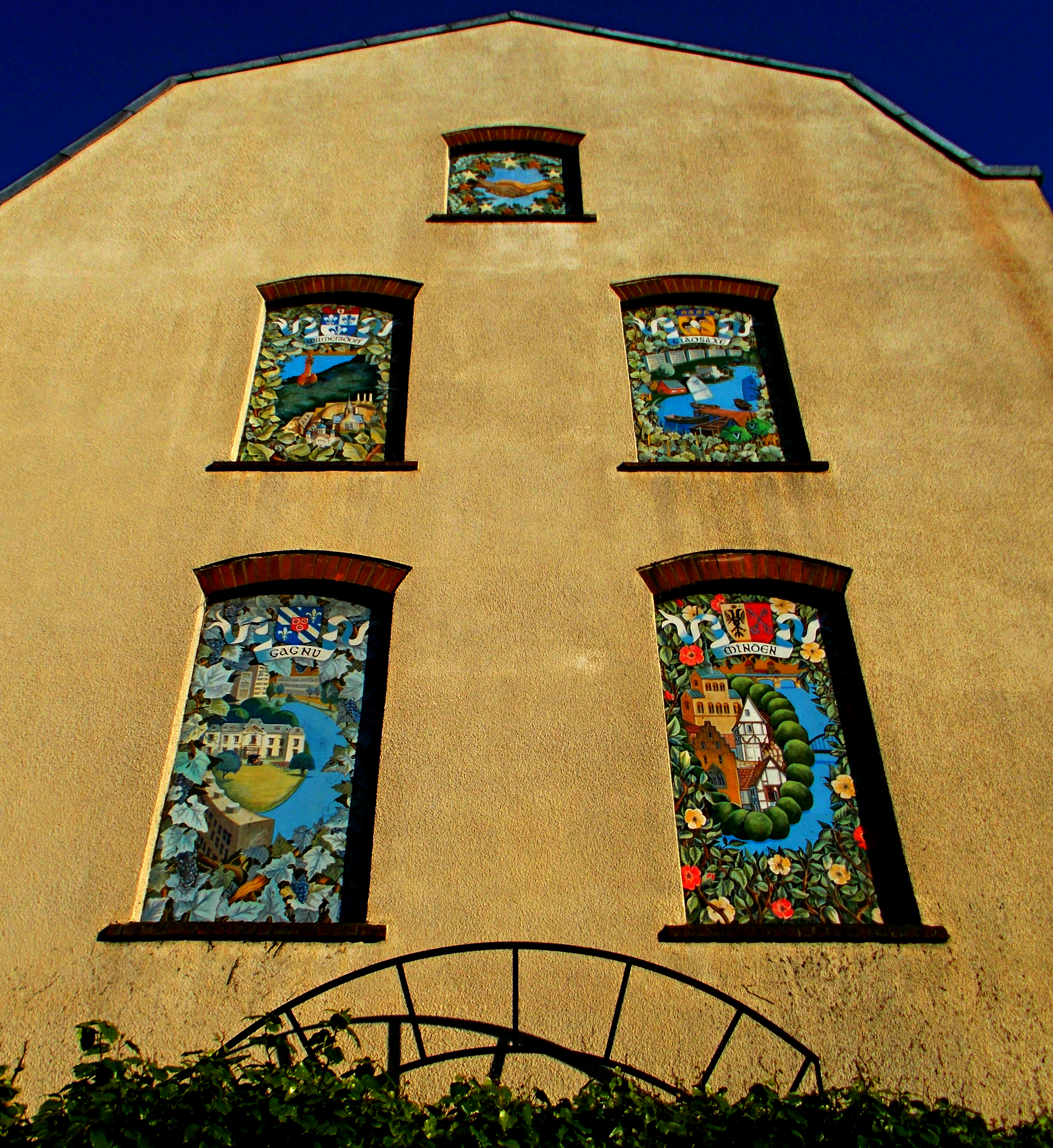
Sutton twin towns mural

Public art has been used to celebrate twin town links, for instance in the form of seven mural paintings in the centre of the town of Sutton, Greater London. The five main paintings show a number of the main features of the London Borough of Sutton and its four twin towns, along with the heraldic shield of each above the other images. Each painting also features a plant as a visual representation of its town's environmental awareness. In the case of Sutton this is in a separate smaller painting (above its main one) showing a beech tree, intended as a symbol of prosperity and from which Carshalton Beeches in the borough derives its name. Another example of the use of public art is the wall sculpture of the partner cities of Munich, Germany.

A 2013 study has concluded that geographical distance has very little, if any, influence upon communities' selections of a twin town. Twinned towns are often chosen because of similarities between them; thus about 15 towns in Wales are twinned with towns in Brittany, and Oxford is with Bonn, Leiden, Grenoble and other university cities. In Italy, sets of twins are Rovigo with Viernheim, Bedford and Tulcea. Many former West German cities are twinned with former East German cities; these twinning links were established before the fall of the Iron Curtain. Famous examples are the partnerships of Hanover and Leipzig, both of which have important trade fair grounds, or between Hamburg and Dresden. The first US-German town twinning was in 1947 between Worthington, Minnesota and Crailsheim. St Petersburg in Russia holds the record for the largest number of partnership arrangements with other communities. In June 2012, the Scottish village of Dull and the US town of Boring, Oregon, agreed to twin their municipalities to promote tourism in both places, playing on their names.

In the early 21st century, some towns made novelty twinning arrangements with fictional or virtual locations. For example, Wincanton, England is partnered with Ankh-Morpork from Terry Pratchett's Discworld books, and the Isle of Skye, Scotland is twinned with the virtual Skylands. Town twinning has increasingly been used to form strategic international business links. For example, in the 1990s, when the Nottingham City Council in the UK considered installing a tram network, it consulted experts from its twin city of Karlsruhe, which has one of the most extensive and efficient tram networks in Germany. With assistance from Karlsruhe's specialist engineers, Nottingham completed its second tram line in 2013. In 2014, Bristol and New Orleans announced their intention to form a "tuning" partnership based on a shared musical heritage and culture offer, at the initiative of Bristol Mayor George Ferguson. Annecy, France, and Nerima, Tokyo have for several years shared a partnership based on their "co-existent animation industry".

=== North America ===
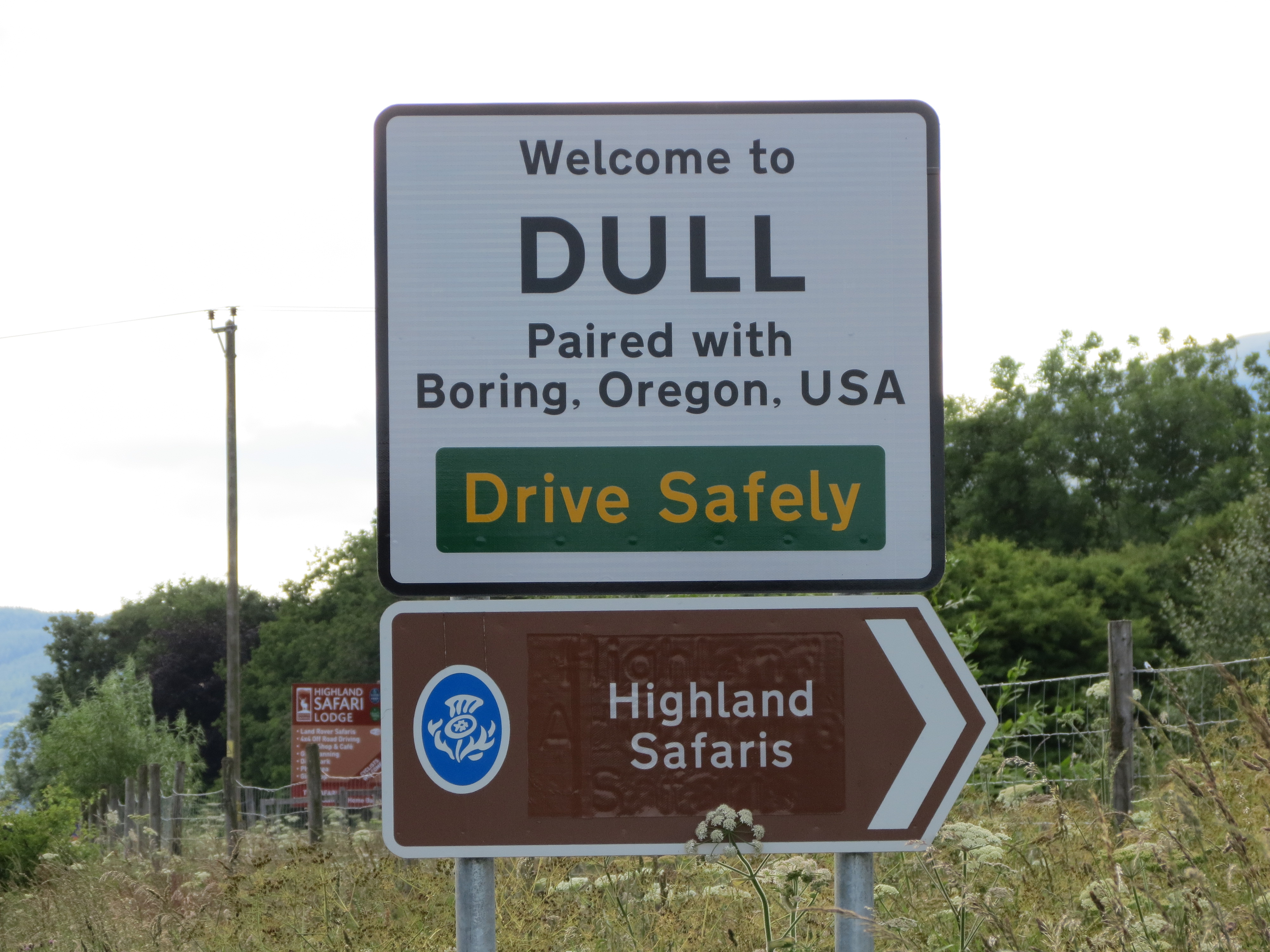
Dull, Perth and Kinross, Scotland is twinned with Boring, Oregon, United States.

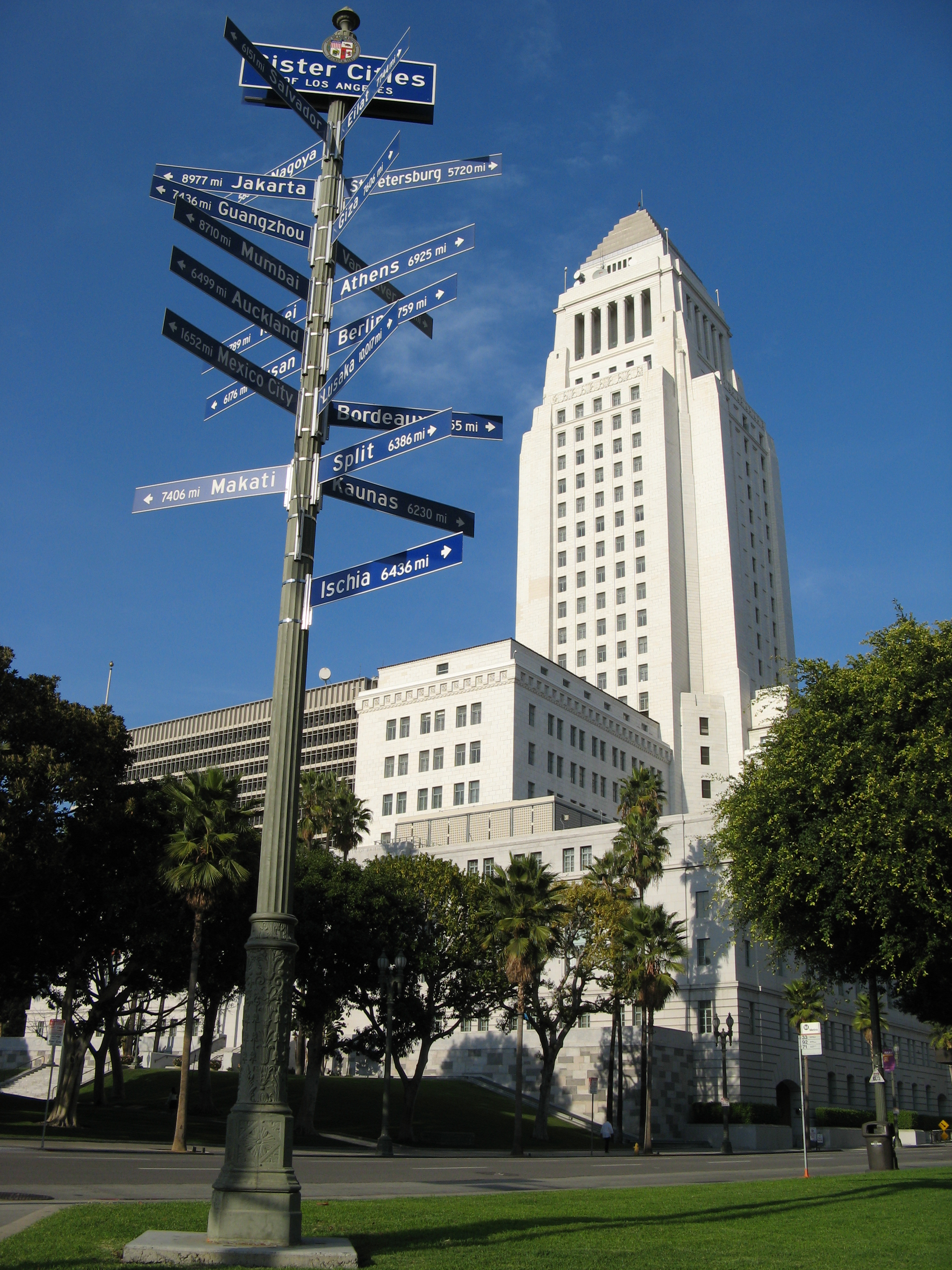
Los Angeles City Hall with twin towns fingerpost

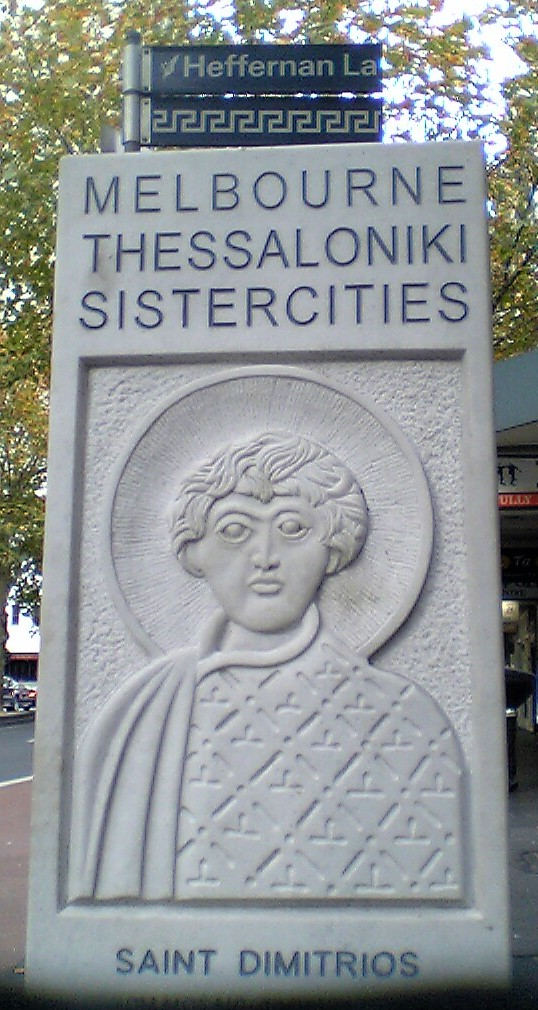
Thessaloniki stele, in sister city Melbourne

Toledo, United States twinned with Toledo, Spain in 1931, and was the first city in North America to engage in town twinning. Vancouver, Canada twinned with Odesa, Ukraine in 1944, was the first twinned city in Canada and the second in North America, while Denver, Colorado, twinned with Brest, France, was the second twinned city in the United States. Liberal, Kansas was twinned with Olney, United Kingdom in 1950, and the cities have run a joint Pancake Day race ever since. Littleton, Colorado, twinned with Bega, Australia, in 1961. Tashkent, the capital city of Uzbekistan, was twinned with Seattle, Washington, in 1973. Rochester, Minnesota, and Knebworth, UK, both centers for primary medical research, twinned in 1967. Ontario, California, has five sister cities around the world. They are Brockville, Ontario, Canada (since 1977); Guamúchil, Sinaloa, Mexico (since 1982); Mocorito, Sinaloa, Mexico (since 1982); Los Mochis, Sinaloa, Mexico (since 1988); and Winterthur, Canton of Zürich, Switzerland. Oakville, Ontario is twinned with Dorval, Quebec; Huai'an, China, and Neyagawa, Osaka, Japan.

Town twinning begins for a variety of reasons. Generally, partner towns have similar demographics and size. They may arise from business connections, travel, similar industries, diaspora communities, or shared history. For example, the partnership between Portland, Oregon and Bologna, Italy arose from shared industries in biotechnology and education, and a "similar attitude towards food", whereas Chicago's link with Warsaw, Poland began with Chicago's historic Polish community. The twinning of Indianapolis with Monza, Italy, is due to both cities' long association with auto racing. Or in the case of Atlanta and Tbilisi, the two cities twinned over their shared status as a capital of Georgia.

A twin towns program was instituted in the United States in 1956 when President Dwight D. Eisenhower proposed a citizen diplomacy initiative. Sister Cities International (SCI) was originally a program of the National League of Cities, but it became a separate corporation in 1967 due to the growth and popularity of the program. Twin town cultural events include the annual National Cherry Blossom Festival in Washington, D.C., honoring Washington's twin relationship with Tokyo City. Many twinned towns developed business agreements with their partners. For example, Vermont's Ben & Jerry's Ice Cream company opened a factory in the Republic of Karelia in Russia and offered the same profit-sharing plan to its Russian employees.

=== Asia ===
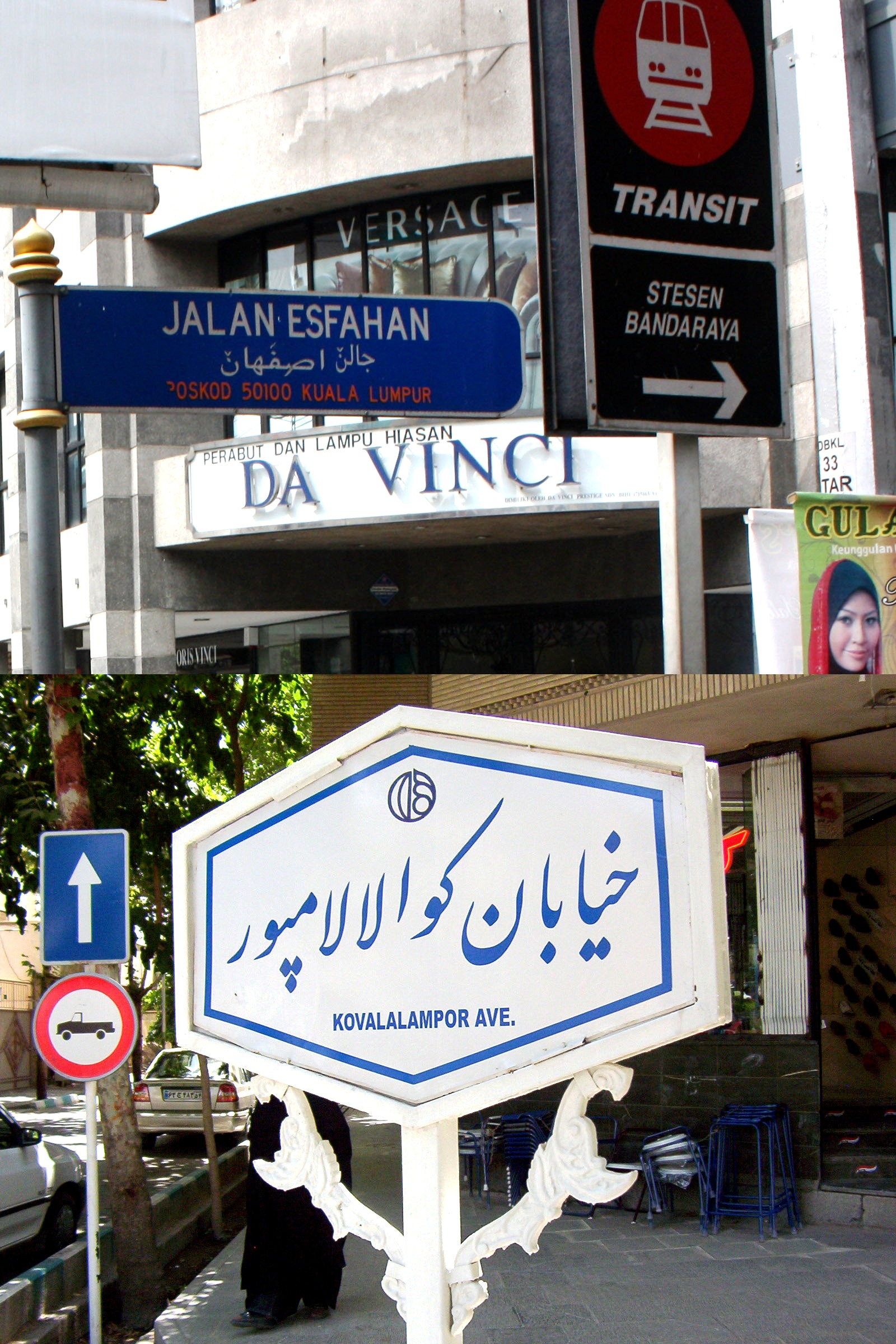
Esfahan Street in Kuala Lumpur (top) and Kuala Lumpur Avenue in Isfahan (bottom)

China's sister city relationships are managed by the Chinese People's Association for Friendship with Foreign Countries, a united front organization. Sister city initiatives are an increasingly widespread mechanism for Chinese public diplomacy. From the early 2000s until 2024, the number of China's sister city relationships doubled. More than one-third of Chinese sister city relationships are with sister cities in the east Asia Pacific region.

Town twinning is supported in Japan by the Council of Local Authorities for International Relations, a joint agency of local governments established by the Japanese government in 1988 (similar to Sister Cities International, its counterpart in the US). In Japan, the international city relations may be split into multiple terms, such as Sister Cities, Friendship Cooperation Cities, Business Partner Cities (BPC), Memorandum of Understanding (MOU), Sister Ports / Friendship Ports, etc. China mostly uses the term "friendship cooperation cities" rather than "sister cities", as the Chinese words for sisters, "姐妹" (reading: jiěmèi, literally elder sister and younger sister), could imply a hierarchical relationship. In the 2010s, Tokyo began to actively promote 'city diplomacy' with other global cities at the initiative of governor Yoichi Masuzoe.

== Linguistic reasons ==
Relationships between communities can also arise because of shared names; they may be named after one community (as in the case of Córdoba), they may share names (as in the case of Santiago de Compostela), or their names may have a common etymology. These similarities usually arise from sharing the same or related language or having been a colony or previously conquered.

== Political significance ==
The twinning of towns and cities is sometimes done for political purposes. The Hungarian city Gyöngyös was twinned with the Azerbaijani city of Shusha in 2013, signing the twinning agreement with representatives from the Azerbaijani government; Hungary recognised Shusha as de jure part of Azerbaijan, even though it was controlled at the time and until 2020 by the military forces of Armenia and the unrecognised Republic of Artsakh. An attempt was made in 2003 by Preston city councillors in England to twin with the Palestinian town of Nablus in the name of solidarity. Turkey bans partnerships with any city in a country that recognizes the Armenian genocide. As a result, when Bulgaria recognized the genocide in 2016, some twin agreements such as Edirne–Haskovo were terminated by Turkey.

China manages sister city relationships through the Chinese People's Association for Friendship with Foreign Countries (CPAFFC). In April 2019, CPAFFC president Li Xiaolin said: "Friendship city relations have become one of the important channels to implement the Belt and Road Initiative." In January 2020, Shanghai canceled its sister city relationship with Prague after Prague's mayor signed a sister city relationship with Taipei. In November 2020, US senator Marsha Blackburn introduced legislation, the Sister City Transparency Act, to provide federal oversight to mitigate risks of sister city agreements being used for political influence campaigns. In 2024, Indiana banned localities from entering into sister city agreements with six "foreign adversary" countries. In August 2025, Texas governor Greg Abbott signed a law prohibiting sister city agreements with countries designated foreign adversaries.

== Termination ==
In 2011, several British towns ended their twinning arrangements. In 2012, the city of Nanjing suspended their sister city relationship with Nagoya after Nanjing Massacre denialist statements by Nagoya's mayor, Takashi Kawamura. In 2013, the Italian cities of Milan, Venice, and Turin, formerly twinned with Saint Petersburg, suspended their links due to the Russian anti-LGBTQ law. Activists in California circulated petitions urging California cities and counties with relationships with Russian counterparts to take similar steps. In 2014, Prague terminated its partnership with Saint Petersburg and Moscow because of the 2014 Russian military intervention in Ukraine. Moscow had been Prague's partner city since 1995.

In 2017, Hirofumi Yoshimura (the mayor of Osaka) ended the city's 60-year relationship with San Francisco due to the erection of a memorial (the San Francisco Comfort Women Memorial) to comfort women in downtown San Francisco. Similarly, the cities of Glendale, California, and Higashiōsaka, Japan, came close to terminating their twinning in 2013 and 2014 because of an ongoing dispute over Glendale's support for the erection of a statue dedicated to Korean comfort women in a city park. In July 2020, the town council of Nieuwegein, a Dutch city south of Utrecht, voted to end its friendship with Puławy in eastern Poland, citing "gay free zones" as the reason. In March 2017, Gaziantep in Turkey unilaterally (but not formally) broke its stedenband with Nijmegen in the Netherlands when the latter rejected pressure to side with the Turkish government amidst diplomatic tensions with the Dutch government (the so-called Turkijerel). After several years of inactivity, in 2021 Nijmegen's city council formally terminated the stedenband formed with Gaziantep in 2006, citing political and administrative reasons; yet when the February 2023 Turkey–Syria earthquakes hit Gaziantep and its environs, the mayor of Nijmegen still sent a public letter of heartfelt sympathy and condolences to the mayor of Gaziantep.

In March 2022, the City of Melbourne council voted unanimously to suspend its relationship with Saint Petersburg as a result of the 2022 Russian invasion of Ukraine. In March 2022, Doncaster cut ties with their twin-town Ozyorsk, also due to the Russian invasion of Ukraine. On 22 March 2022, Coventry voted to temporarily pause the city's link with Volgograd (formerly Stalingrad) and explore twinning with Mariupol instead due to the Russian invasion of Ukraine. On 28 March 2022, Oak Ridge, Tennessee, temporarily suspended its relationship with Obninsk due to the Russian invasion of Ukraine. In July 2022, the city of Eugene, Oregon, suspended its ties to Irkutsk due to the Russian invasion of Ukraine. In February 2023, the mayor of Barcelona broke ties with twin city Tel Aviv, citing Israeli apartheid as the reason.

== Gallery ==
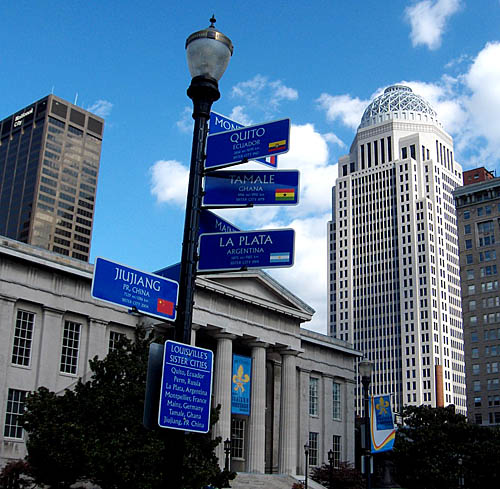
Louisville's twin towns

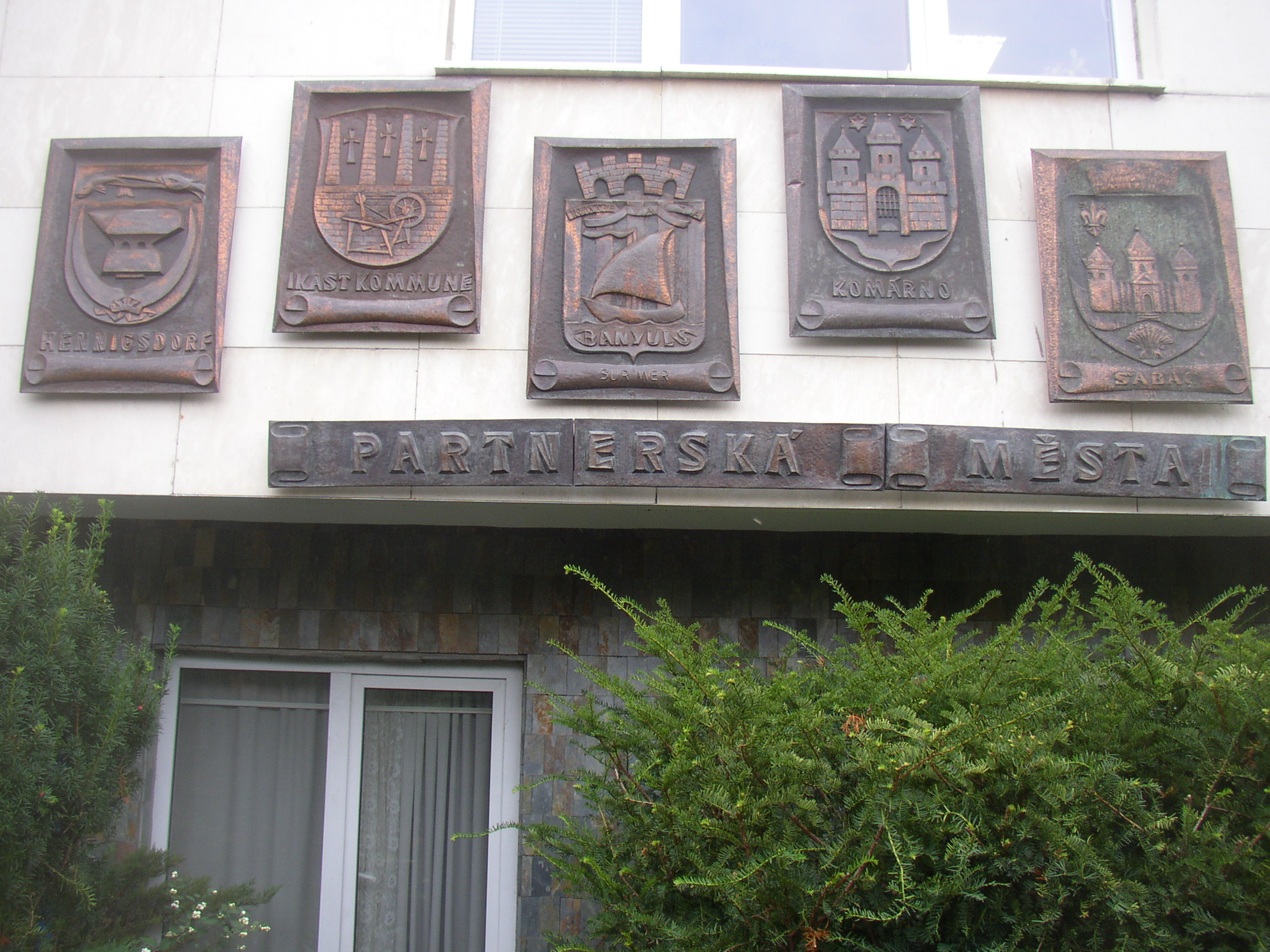
Insignia of twin towns on town hall in Kralupy nad Vltavou, Czech Republic

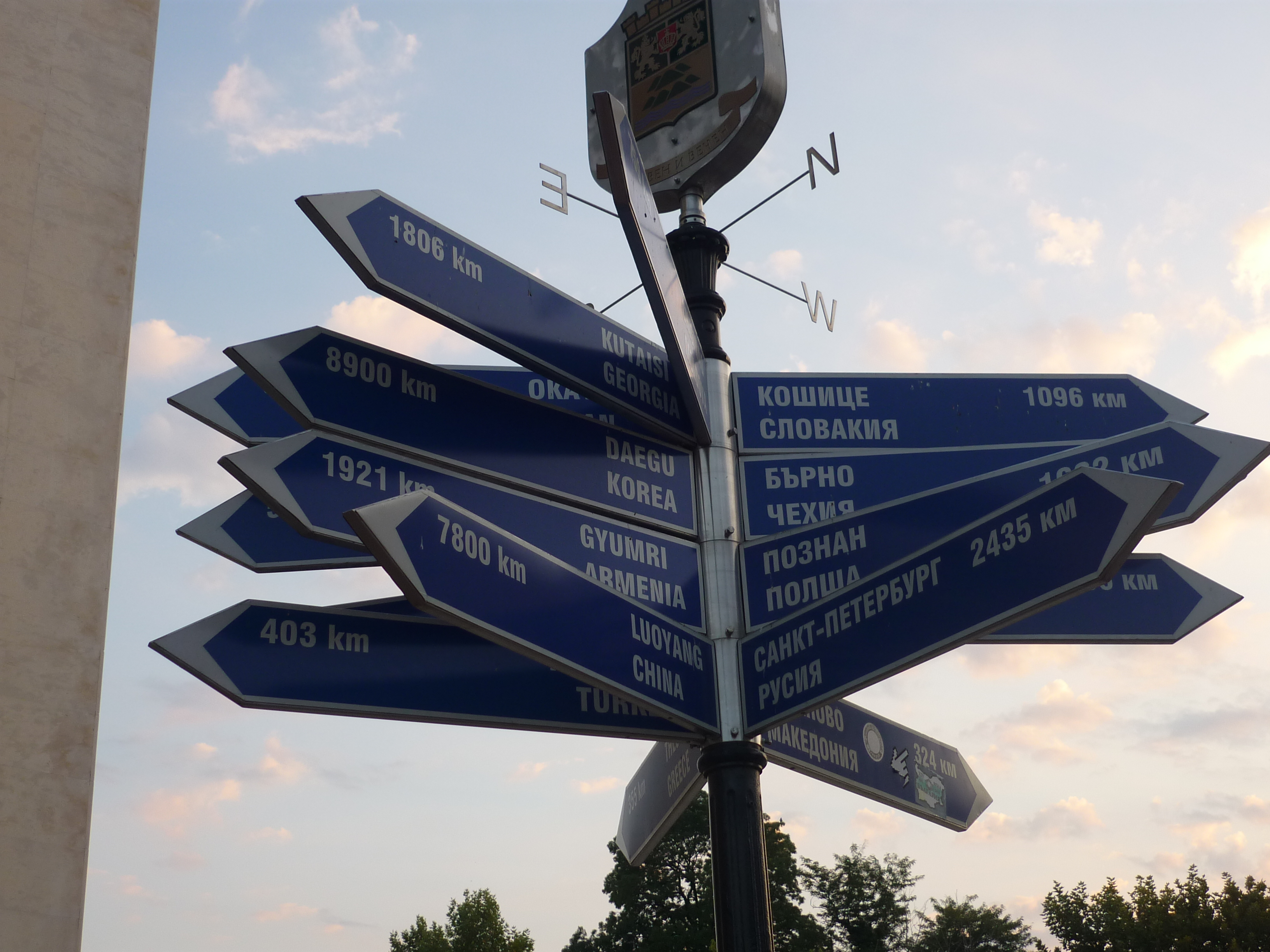
Plovdiv, Bulgaria, twin towns directions

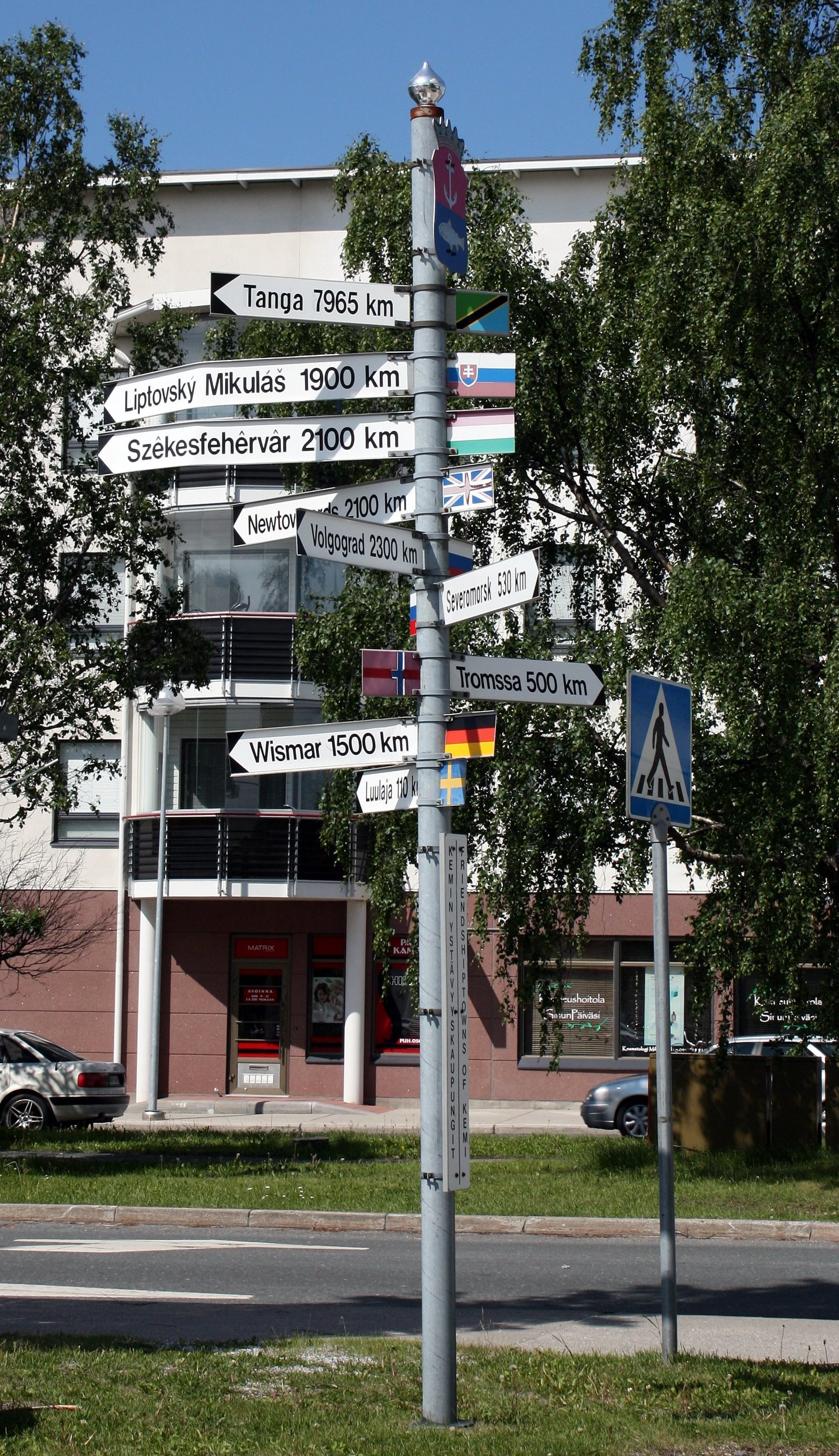
Twin town signs of Kemi, Finland

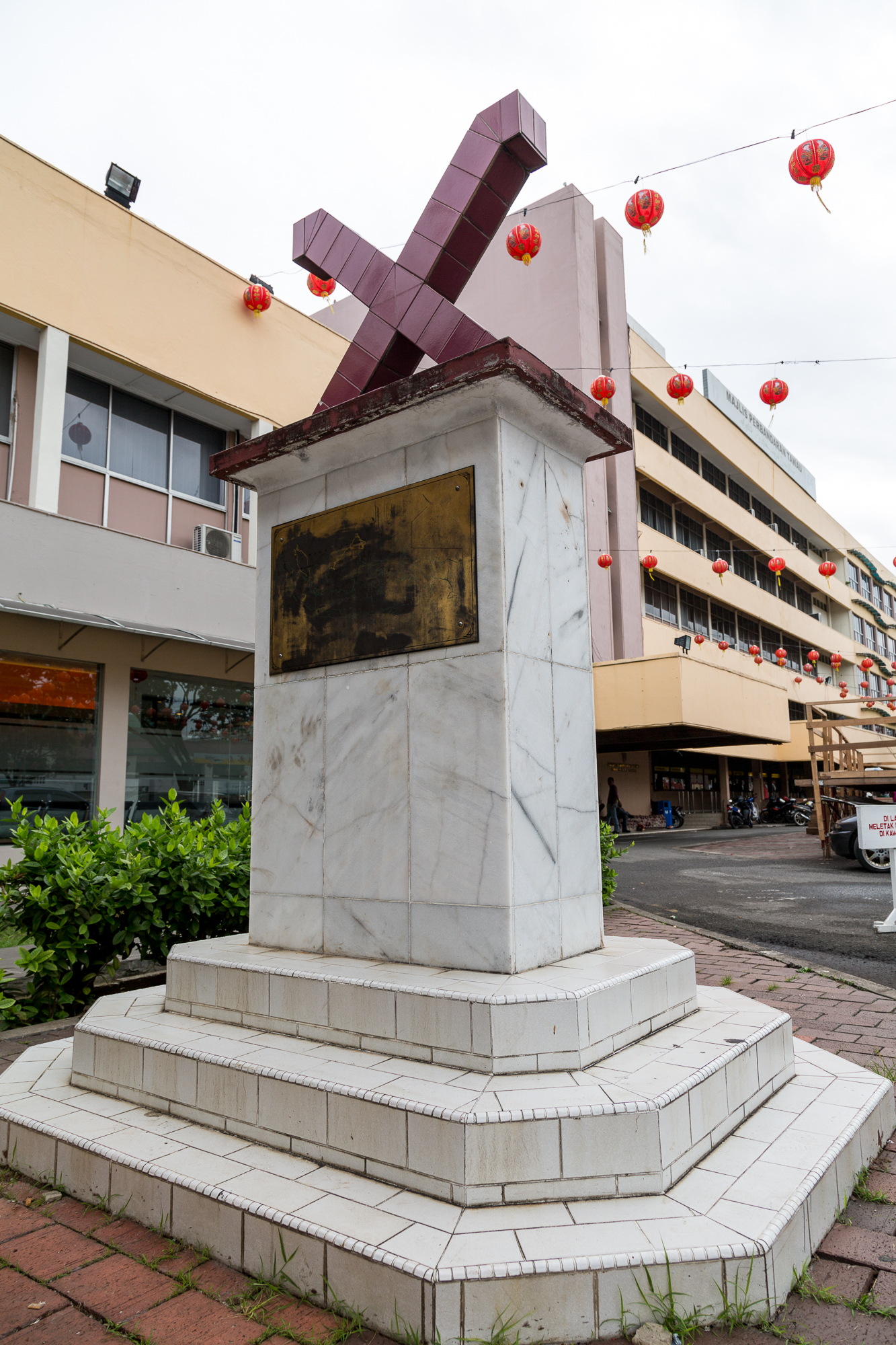
Twin town monument in Tawau, Sabah, Malaysia

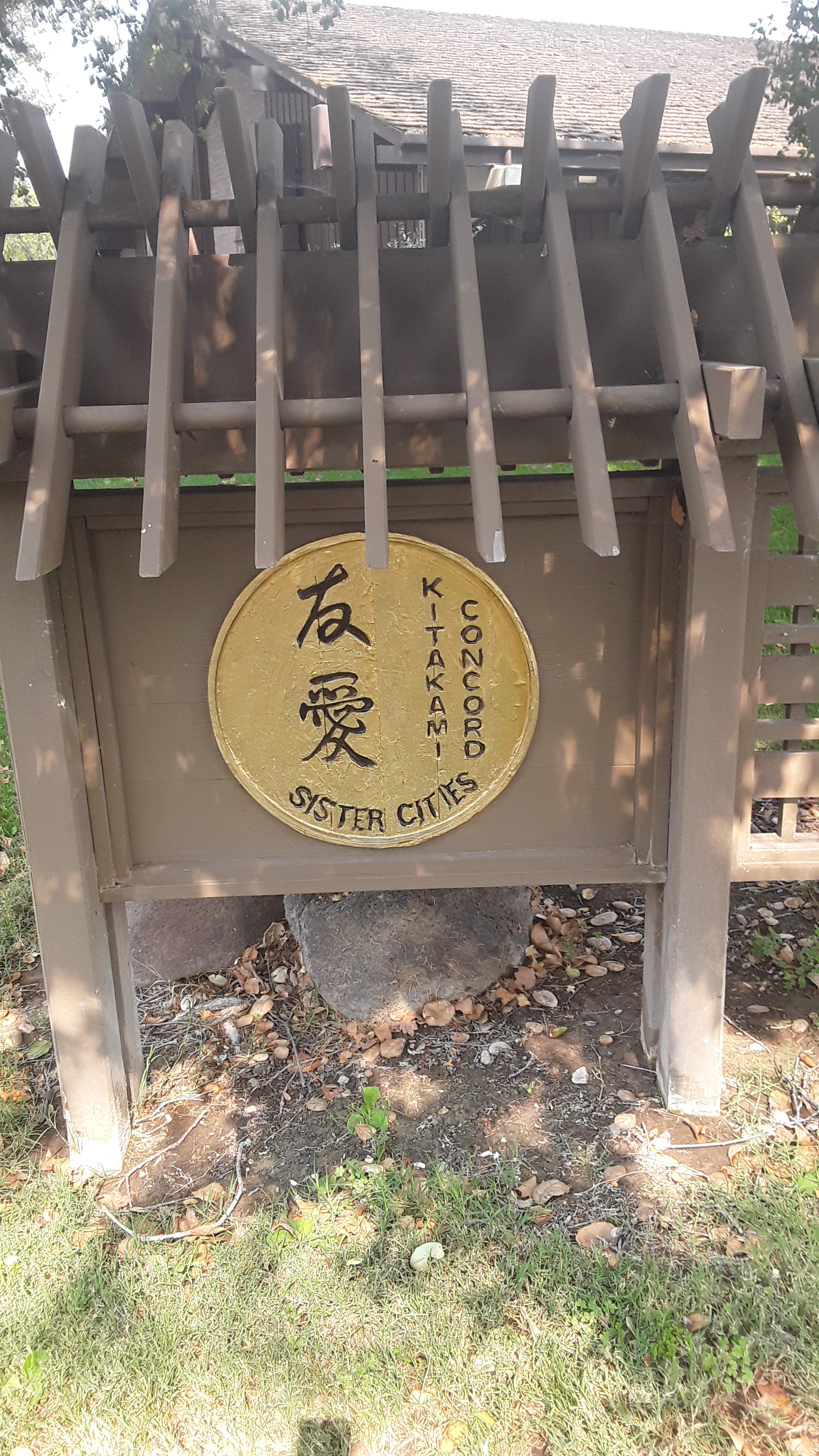
Artwork produced by Japanese and American citizens to celebrate the sister city relationship between Concord and Kitakami

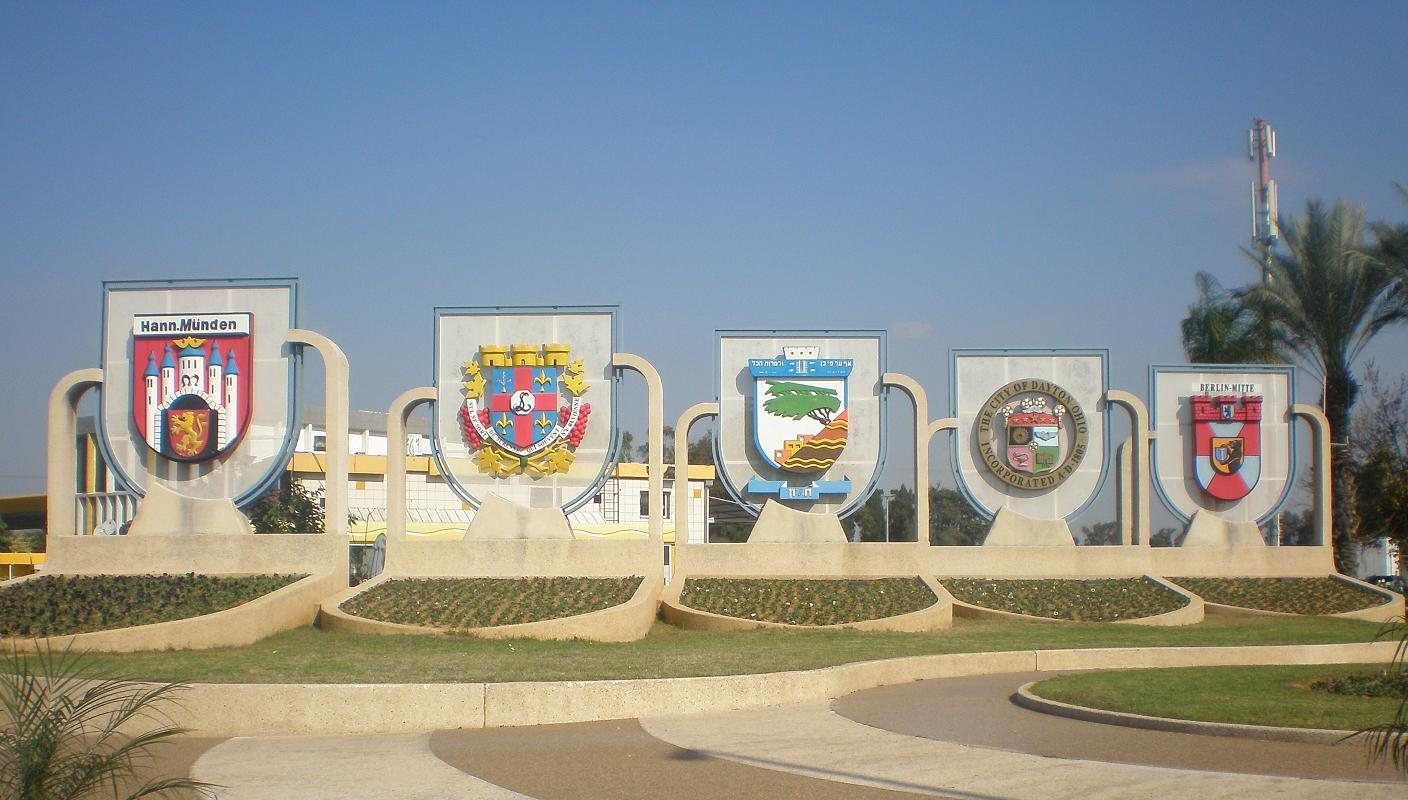
Holon, Israel, a twin towns garden

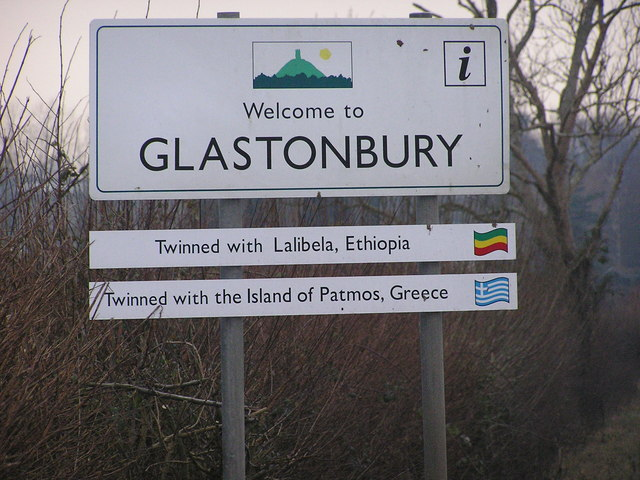
Welcome to Glastonbury, UK – Twin towns Lalibela, Ethiopia, and Patmos, Greece

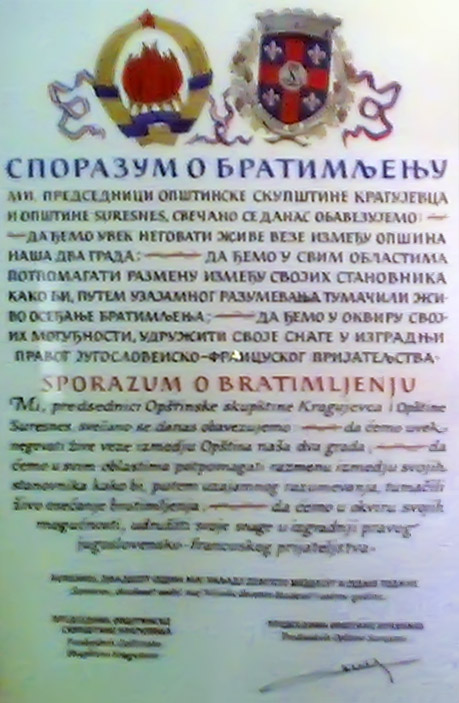
Kragujevac and Suresnes twinning agreement

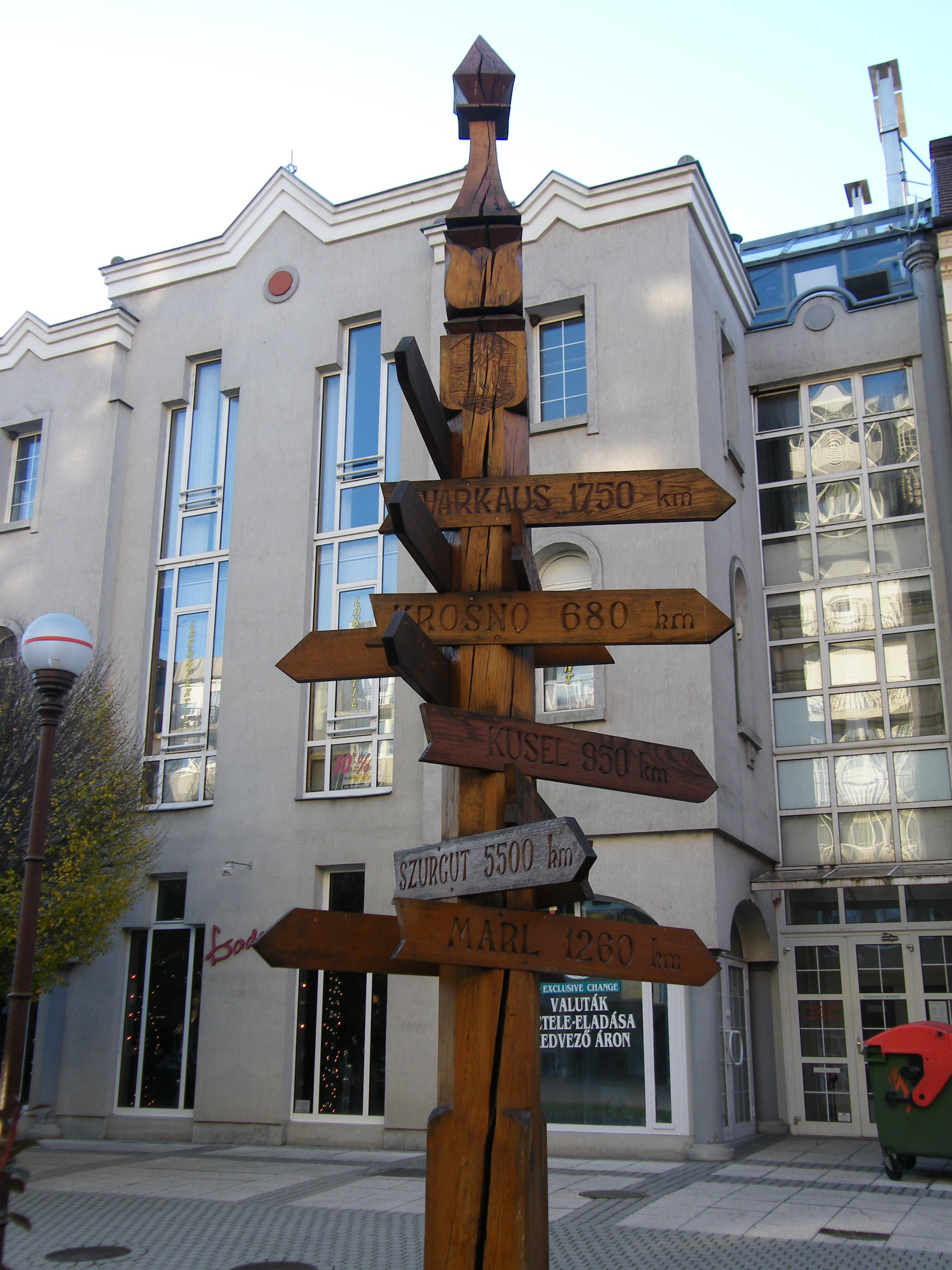
Zalaegerszeg, Hungary twinnings

== See also ==
- Council of Local Authorities for International Relations
- Cross-border town naming
- Douzelage
- Global city
- Lists of twin towns and sister cities
- List of twin towns and sister cities in Europe
- Paradiplomacy
- Partnership2Gether
- Sister Cities International
- Sister castle
- Twin cities
- Twinning (cooperation)
