= Protodiplomacy =

Subnational diplomacy with secessionist aims

Protodiplomacy is a form of paradiplomacy in which the international activities of a subnational government are used to promote claims of political independence or autonomy, potentially leading to secession. The term distinguishes these activities from paradiplomacy more broadly, which encompasses the international engagement of regions without necessarily challenging the sovereignty of their parent state.

== Definition ==
Protodiplomacy was first defined by Ivo Duchacek in 1986 as "initiatives and activities of a non-central government abroad that graft a more or less separatist message on to its economic, social, and cultural links with foreign nations." While paradiplomacy generally refers to the international activities of subnational governments that complement or support the foreign policy of the central government, protodiplomacy is characterized by its orientation toward gaining international recognition and support for eventual independence.

Distinguishing between paradiplomacy and protodiplomacy is primarily a matter of intent and political context. Protodiplomacy tends to exacerbate political tensions between central governments and their subnational counterparts, whereas paradiplomacy typically operates within a framework of cooperation and constitutional loyalty. The shift from paradiplomacy to protodiplomacy often occurs when a region's international activities begin to prioritize identity promotion and international legitimacy over functional economic or cultural cooperation.

=== Characteristics ===
The pattern of relations between regions engaging in protodiplomacy and their central governments is often marked by ongoing conflict rather than cooperation. Ivo Duchacek identified four patterns of relations between regions and central governments, with protodiplomacy typically associated with "cooperative-competitive segmentation" (where competition outweighs cooperation) or "secessionist fragmentation" (where the central government has minimal control over the region's international activities).

Scholars note that protodiplomacy rarely achieves its ultimate goal of securing significant international support for secession, and may instead lead to international isolation and ethnopolitical conflict.

== Historical and contemporary examples ==
=== Quebec ===
The Province of Quebec in Canada represents one of the most studied cases of protodiplomacy. Quebec's international activities intensified under the administration of the Parti Québécois, which sought to persuade other countries to recognize Quebec's aspirations for independence. Following the failure of the 1995 Quebec referendum, Quebec's foreign relations shifted back toward paradiplomacy focused on economic and cultural goals rather than independence. The province established an extensive network of international offices and signed hundreds of international agreements, particularly with France and the United States.

=== Kurdistan Region ===
The Kurdistan Region of Iraq has engaged in protodiplomacy since 2003, establishing its own Department of Foreign Relations and maintaining numerous foreign representations. The region's protodiplomatic activities culminated in the 2017 Kurdistan Region independence referendum, in which approximately 93% of voters supported independence from Iraq.

=== Other cases ===
Other regions that have engaged in varying degrees of protodiplomacy include Quebec, Scotland, Tatarstan, and Catalonia. While their diplomatic actions lay the groundwork for independence, they also expose a paradox: a vocal desire for autonomy paired with a fear of the risks that come with a hard secession.

Various de facto states such as Transnistria, Abkhazia, South Ossetia, Nagorno-Karabakh, Puntland, and Somaliland have also engaged in protodiplomacy. However, the visibility of these cases is not the result of some intrinsic qualities of the affected territory, but rather depends on the involvement of powerful external actors such as Russia or the United States which determine their fate.

== Explanatory factors ==
=== Nationalism ===
Advanced nationalism within a region is widely recognized as the primary driver of protodiplomacy. Regions with strong nationalist movements, such as Quebec, Catalonia, and the Kurdistan Region, have developed more extensive protodiplomatic activities. The desire to promote and gain international recognition for a distinct national identity often motivates regions to pursue independence through diplomatic channels.

=== Constitutional and legal framework ===
The constitutional and legal framework governing the powers of subnational governments significantly influences the development of protodiplomacy. Ambiguous constitutional provisions regarding the international competencies of regions can provide opportunities for expanded foreign activities. Federal systems that grant regions substantial autonomy in areas with international dimensions create space for protodiplomatic activity.

=== Regional autonomy ===
The degree of regional autonomy is closely linked to the capacity for protodiplomacy. Regions with higher levels of political, economic, and institutional autonomy are better positioned to develop independent foreign relations. This autonomy often includes control over security forces, natural resources, and legislative powers that facilitate international engagement.

=== Intergovernmental relations ===
The pattern of relations between regional and central governments affects the likelihood and intensity of protodiplomacy. Persistent conflicts over constitutional powers, resource allocation, or territorial disputes tend to drive regions toward more confrontational foreign activities. When the central government is perceived as violating constitutional agreements or marginalizing regional interests, protodiplomacy may intensify.

== Normalization and institutional recognition ==
Despite initial resistance from central governments, protodiplomacy has gained some degree of institutional and legal recognition in various contexts. International organizations such as the Council of Europe and the European Union have created mechanisms for subnational participation in international processes, though these are primarily designed for cooperative paradiplomacy rather than secessionist protodiplomacy. The normalization of regional international activities allows for selective incorporation of subnational entities into the diplomatic system while maintaining the hierarchical structure dominated by sovereign states.

== Outcomes and effectiveness ==
Research suggests that protodiplomacy rarely achieves its primary objective of securing international support for secession. Instead, it often leads to international isolation and increased domestic conflict, with significant economic, social, and political costs. The cases of Kosovo and South Sudan, which successfully achieved independence, represent exceptions rather than the norm for protodiplomatic efforts.

Nevertheless, protodiplomacy can serve important functions beyond secession. It provides a mechanism for regions to express collective identities and political aspirations on the international stage, potentially serving as a form of political compromise between demands for full independence and integration within the existing state structure. The ambiguity of protodiplomatic activity allows regions to simultaneously declare a will for independence while avoiding more radical and risky secessionist moves.
