= St. Paul's College, Namibia =

Catholic school in Windhoek, Namibia

St. Paul's College

Location
- Klein Windhoek, Windhoek; Namibia
- Coordinates: 22°34′28″S 17°6′34″E

Information
- Type: Private primary and secondary school
- Motto: Latin: Caritate fundati (Founded in love)
- Religious affiliation(s): Catholicism
- Established: 1962; 63 years ago
- Founder: Tilburg Fathers
- Grades: 1-12
- Gender: Boys (1962 to 1990); Co-educational (since 1990)
- Website: spcnam.org

St. Paul's College is a private Catholic primary and secondary school, located in Windhoek, the capital of Namibia.

== History and operations ==
The school was established in 1962 as a Catholic white boys' school. The Roman Catholic Church purchased a farm situated at the foot of Roman Hill in Klein Windhoek, a low-density suburb. Due to the presence of hot springs and fountains at the time, it was possible to develop a vineyard, gardens and orchards where the school is currently located.

When Namibia became independent from South Africa in 1990, the school became multicultural and was opened to girls from grades 1 to 12.

In 2014, St. Paul's College was Namibia's second-best high school, behind St Boniface College, located in the Kavango East Region.

== Notable people of St. Paul's ==
=== Staff ===
- Rebecca Ndjoze-Ojo, parliamentarian and former deputy minister, was principal of the school in the 2010s

=== Alumni ===
- Tony Figueira, photographer
- Zenobia Kloppers, actress

== See also ==
- Education in Namibia
- List of schools in Namibia
- Roman Catholicism in Namibia
