= Proença-a-Nova =

- Municipality
- Town of Proença-a-Nova
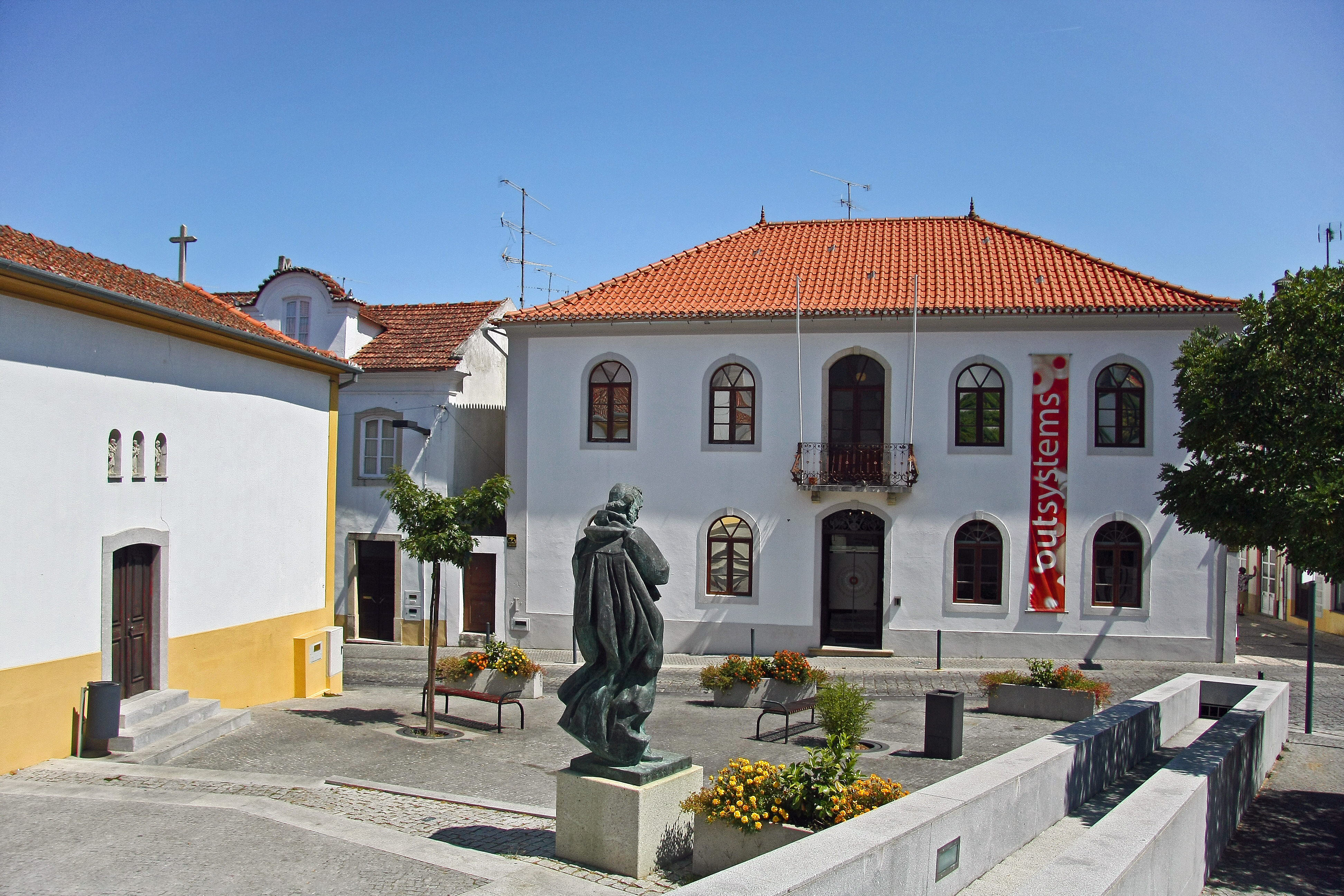

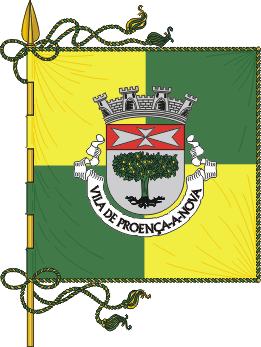
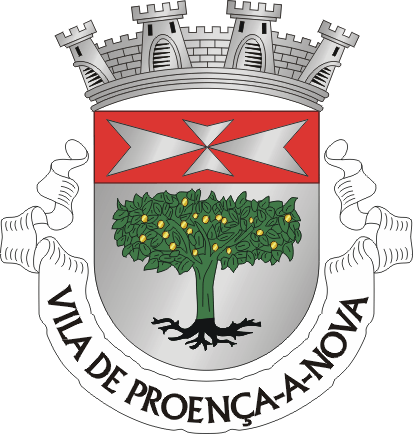
- Flag Coat of arms
- Interactive map of Proença-a-Nova
- Coordinates: 39°45′N 7°56′W
- Country: Portugal
- Region: Centro
- Intermunic. comm.: Beira Baixa
- District: Castelo Branco
- Parishes: 4

Government
  - President: João Lobo (PS)

Area
  - Total: 395.40 km^{2} (152.66 sq mi)

Population (2021)
  - Total: 7,167
  - Density: 18.13/km^{2} (46.95/sq mi)
- Time zone: UTC+00:00 (WET)
  - Summer (DST): UTC+01:00 (WEST)
- Local holiday: June 13
- Website: http://www.cm-proencanova.pt

Proença-a-Nova (Portuguese pronunciation: [pɾuˈẽsa ˈnɔvɐ]), officially the Town of Proença-a-Nova (Portuguese: Vila de Proença-a-Nova), is a municipality in the district of Castelo Branco in Portugal. The population in 2021 was 7,167, in an area of 395.40 km^{2}.

The present mayor is João Lobo. The municipal holiday is June 13.

== Parishes ==
Administratively, the municipality is divided into 4 civil parishes (freguesias):

- Montes da Senhora
- Proença-a-Nova e Peral
- São Pedro do Esteval
- Sobreira Formosa e Alvito da Beira
  - Figueira

== History ==
Proença-a-Nova traces its origins to Roman times when it was called Cortiçada in the province of the Lusitani. This is corroborated by archaeological findings and the innumerable Latin names.

The name Cortiçada was abandoned in C.XVI in favour of Proença. Cortiçada perhaps related to the abundant production of cork oak (cortiça) or the number of tenement houses (colmeias) that had been of great importance in the region.

Padre C. da Costa described in Corografia Portugueza (1712): "The town of Proença, situated nine leagues (35km) north of Crato, and seven (23km) west of Castelo Branco, was chartered by King Afonso III of Portugal (1248-1279). The population was 150."

Until the date of its first charter, by Afonso III, little is known about the village of Proença but it is believed that farming the low, fertile, well irrigated lands and hunting the abundant wildlife were the most important ways of subsistence.

The origin of name Proença-a-Nova (New Province) is unclear. The philological scholar Leite de Vasconcelos (Lusitana Magazine 1889, Portuguese Archaeologist 1895, and Museum Etnológico de Belém 1893, Religions of Lusitânia (1897–1913) ) thought that it related to Provence in France and that the inhabitants of Old Provence migrated to Lusitânia. However, this theory has to compete with both the theoretical possibility that the Lusitani may have migrated from the Swiss mountains in the 6th century BCE, long before Julius Caesar conquered and named Provence/Provincia, and another theoretical possibility that they may be autochthonous to the Iberian region.

The population was primitive until being given to the Monks of the Order of the Hospitallers, who collaborated with the first Kings to stabilise and defend the new lands. In 1244, the Prior of the Hospitallers, Frei Rodrigo Egídio, gave Proenca its first charter, a document of great importance establishing the general duties for its inhabitants and a guarantee of defense of rights.

In 1512 the first Proença charter was updated under the rule of King Manuel I of Portugal.

After the abdication of Miguel of Portugal in 1834, Proença became part of the District of Santarém, then in November 1835 part of Castelo Branco,

== Notable people ==
- Pedro da Fonseca (1528 in Proença-a-Nova – 1599) a Portuguese Jesuit philosopher and theologian who worked on logic and metaphysics.
- Bernardo Tavares (born 1980 in Proença-a-Nova) a Portuguese football manager,
