= Maria Tomásia Figueira Lima =

Brazilian aristocrat and abolitionist

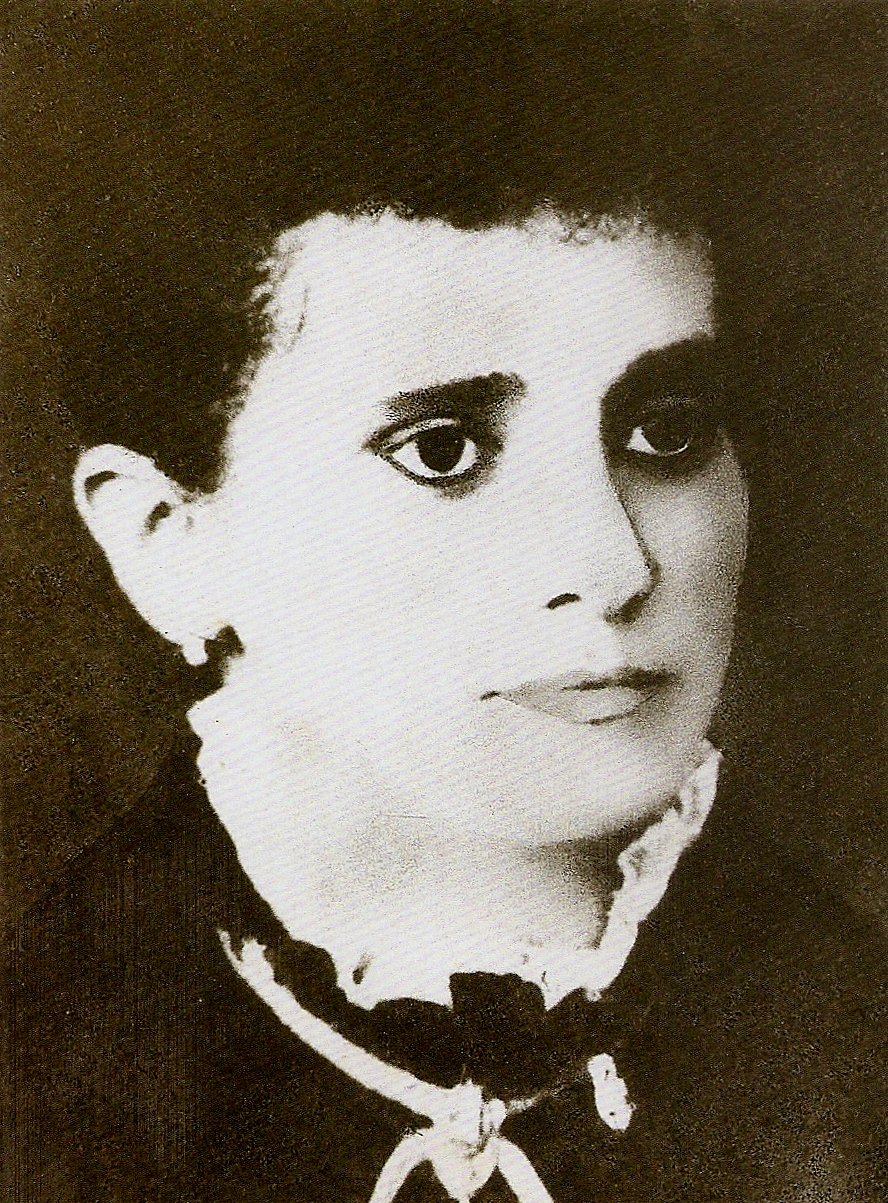
Maria Tomásia Figueira Lima

Maria Tomásia Figueira Lima (6 December 1826 – 1902) was a Brazilian aristocrat and abolitionist. She was the cofounder of the Sociedade das Senhoras Libertadoras ou Cearenses Libertadoras, a group which was the first of its kind in the country that was formed and led exclusively by women.

== Biography ==
Maria Tomásia Figueira was born 6 December 1826, in Sobral, a municipality in the interior of Ceará. She belonged to the traditional families Figueira de Melo, Xerez and Viriato de Medeiros. Her parents were Ana Francisca Figueira de Melo and José Xerez Furna.

She moved to Fortaleza after marrying the abolitionist Francisco de Paula de Oliveira Lima.

In 1882, together with twenty-two abolitionist women of prominent families, including Elvira Pinho, Francisca Nunes da Cruz, Carolina Cordeiro, Luduvina Borges, Eugênia Amaral, Jacinta Souto, Maria Teófilo Morais, Maria Nunes Façanha, Lina Bezerra and Joana Bezerra, among others, Figueira participated in the founding of the Sociedade das Senhoras Libertadoras ou Cearenses Libertadoras. According to the Dicionário da escravidão negra no Brasil, it was installed on 6 January 1883 with the name Sociedade Abolicionista Feminina. Figueira served as president of the organization whose objective was to fight for the abolition of slavery. This group became the first of its kind in Brazil that was formed and led exclusively by women.
