= Figueira, Proença a Nova =

Coordinates: 39°45′08″N 7°51′11″W

Figueira is a small village in the parish (freguesias) of Sobreira Formosa (municipality of Proença-a-Nova) in interior Portugal.
