= Foundation for Science and Technology =

British charity

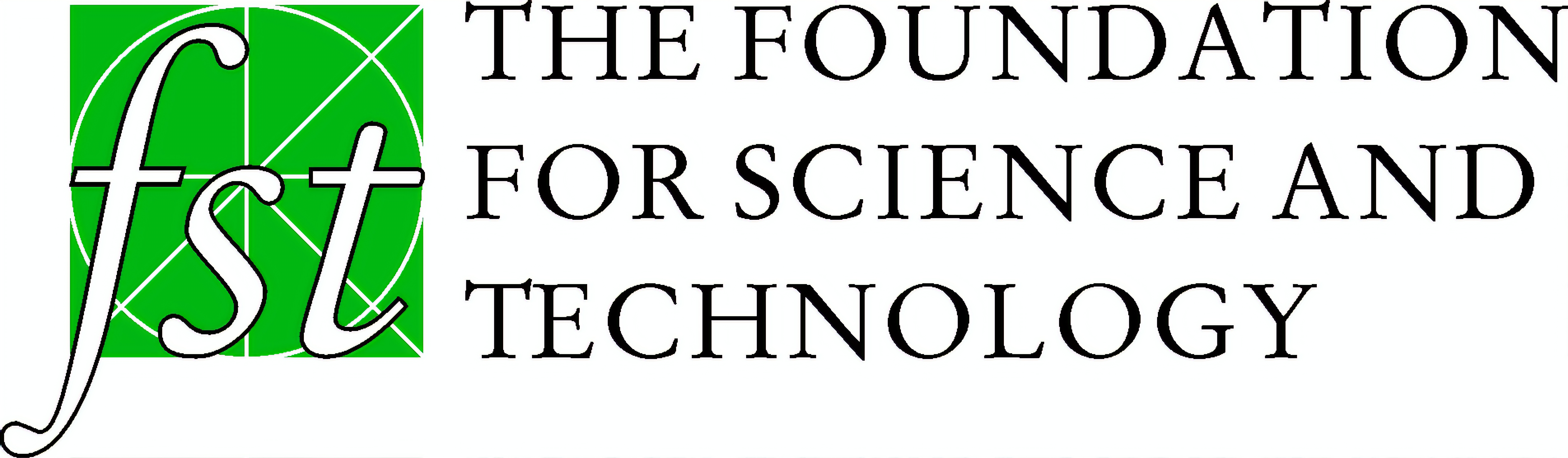
FST Logo

The Foundation for Science and Technology is a British charity, providing a neutral platform for debate of policy issues that have a science, technology or innovation element.

Established in 1977, the Foundation brings together Parliamentarians, civil servants, industrialists, researchers, learned societies, charities and others. It convenes monthly discussion events at the Royal Society, publishes a journal three times a year, hosts a weekly podcast and has recently started to produce a blog on relevant science and technology policy issues. Recent topics of discussion include international research collaboration post- Brexit, facial recognition technologies and their ethics, and digital health data. For the most up to date information regarding events, blogs and podcasts, follow the @FoundSciTech Twitter page.

The foundation also organises the Foundation Future Leaders Programme, supporting mid- career professionals from universities, industry and the civil service, meeting regularly to develop links and further their understanding of how science and research are conducted, and how they feed into the policy process. In addition, the Foundation provides guidance on governance issues to Professional and Learned Societies.

The Foundation is directed by a council and board of trustees, chaired by The Rt Hon the Lord Willetts FRS. The Chief Executive of the Foundation is Gavin Costigan. Day to day the foundation is run by a small team of professionals, located in Westminster, London. The Foundation finances its activities by a mixture of subscriptions from member organisations, part-sponsorship of its events, and grants and donations. This enables it to run most of its activities free of charge for participants.
