= Paradiplomacy =

Involvement of non-central governments in international relations

Paradiplomacy is the involvement of non-central governments in international relations. The phenomenon includes a variety of practices, from town twinning to transnational networking, decentralized cooperation, and advocacy in international summits. Following the movement of globalisation, non-central governments have been playing increasingly influential roles on the global scene, connecting across national borders and developing their own foreign policies. Regions, states, provinces and cities seek their way to promote cooperation, cultural exchanges, trade and partnership, in a large diversity of ways and objectives depending on their decentralization, cultural, and socio-economical contexts. This trend raises new questions concerning public international law and opened a debate on the global governance regime, and the evolution of the nation-led system that has provided the grounds for the international political order in the last centuries.

The term combines the Greek prefix "para-" (παρα) and "diplomacy" to imply actions along, aside, apart and even, despite and against national diplomacy.

While the term "paradiplomacy" has sometimes been used to refer to informal track-two diplomacy, its definition has crystallized in the 1980s through the work of Ivo Duchacek and Panayotis Soldatos, proposing the clear definition of "direct and indirect entries of non-central governments into the field of international relations". The academic field of paradiplomatic studies is nonetheless suffering from fragmentation and terminological scatterdness, resulting both from ongoing debates within scholars, and from the diversity of terms characterizing subnational governments worldwide. Other current denominations for paradiplomacy and related concepts can be multilayered diplomacy, substate or subnational diplomacy, decentralized cooperation, people-to-people diplomacy and intermestic affairs. This latter concept expresses a growing trend to the internationalization of domestic ("intermestic") issues, which takes local and regional concerns to the central stage of international affairs.

The intentions of subnational governments are diverse and depend on the level of devolution of power form the central government following the principle of subsidiarity, and from the level of local democracy defined by decentralization laws. Some subnational governments engage in paradiplomatic activities to promote development by exploring complementarity with partners facing similar problems, with a view to joining forces to arrive at solutions more easily. In addition, they can explore opportunities alongside international organizations that offer assistance programs for local development projects, with ideas of cross-cultural connections and reciprocity.

== History of paradiplomacy ==
The global involvement of subnational government is often linked with the post-war town twinning movement, but can actually be traced back even further. Throughout history, cities and towns "have played a central role economically, politically, and culturally in all human societies and precede nation states by some 5,000 years". The historical role and stability of cities can be noted when compared to modern forms of central governance, and the recent appearance of "Westphalian" nation-states four centuries ago, binding subnational governments to the sovereignty of nations.

The first envoys of non-sovereign subnational governments acting as diplomatic representatives can be traced back to the second half of the nineteenth century, with delegates of overseas colonial governments settling in Paris or London. And the first formal diplomatic agreement involving a subnational government may have been signed in 1907 between the Brazilian state of São Paulo and the country of Japan, for immigration management purposes. Cultural motivations led to the first city-to-city twinnings in 1918 between European localities, a growingly popular form of subnational cooperation later labelled "people-to-people diplomacy" by US President Eisenhower. Town twinning became an officially recognized instrument of peace and reconciliation in the aftermath of the Second World War, inciting a lasting dynamic that led to more than 11,000 twinnings worldwide in the 1990s, and reaching over 40,000 partnerships today.

Formal cross-border connections also intensified with Europe's post-war efforts to overcome the defensive legacy of frontiers, fostering peaceful transborder relations through formal economic and cultural agreements. Generally facilitated by a decentralization process, the following decades saw a variety of transborder agreements worldwide, such as between US and Canadian states in the 1980s, between Russian and Japanese provinces in the 1990s, and between Spanish, French and Italian neighbor regions from 1992 and onward, a trend that led to numerous collaborations and agreements for migration and cultural purposes, but also for the management of environmental resources and issues transcending regional limitations and nations' borders.

Parallel to bilateral forms of cooperation, multilateralism also developed at the local scale. In 1913, the first transnational network of local governments was created in Ghent (Belgium) in the form of a global municipal movement: the Union Internationale des Villes. This network then became the International Union of Local Authorities (IULA) in 1928. Other transnational networks appeared following the second World War to foster bonds between localities worldwide, such as Sister Cities International in 1956, the Arab Towns organization in 1957, the Union of African Cities in 1975, and the French-Speaking Mayors Association in 1979. The creation of the Network of Regional Governments for Sustainable Development in 2002 (now Regions4) also illustrates how provinces and regions alongside cities formalized their global involvement through transnational networking, a phenomenon that has led to the creation of more than 300 networks linking localities and regions within and across all continents. The dynamic of subnational governments' global involvement has been gradually acknowledged by international institutions. At continental scale, this led, for example, to the creation of the European Conference of Local Authorities in 1957, allowing for territorial authorities to complement (or counterweight) the so-far nation-led Council of Europe. At the global scale, progressive recognition of the subnational level by the United Nations led in 1996 to the organization of WACLA, the first World Assembly of Cities and Local Authorities, gathering more than 500 mayors from around the world along the Habitat II conference in Istanbul. The assembly laid the groundwork for the creation of two major organizations. First, the United Nations Advisory Committee of Local Authorities (UNACLA) was created in 1999 by the Commission on Human Settlements, aiming to facilitate the dialogue of subnational governments with the UN System. This Committee claims today to represent on the global stage around 323,000 institutions of all scales through its member organizations. Second, the global network named United Cities and Local Governments (UCLG) emerged in 2004, with the mission to "promote and represent local governments on the world stage". UCLG has since worked both as a network counting more than 240,000 members worldwide, and as an advocacy platform, initiating the creation of the complementary coordination mechanism Global Taskforce of Local and Regional Governments in 2013.

== Context ==
Paradiplomacy may be performed both in support of and in complementarity to the central state conducted diplomacy, or come in conflict or compete with it. In 1990, Ivo Duchacek pointed out a distinction between different types of paradiplomatic engagements: a) cross-border regional paradiplomacy, b) transregional paradiplomacy and c) global paradiplomacy, to describe: a) contacts between non-central units situated across borders in different states, b) contacts between non-central units without a common border but situated in neighboring states and c) contacts between units belonging to states without common borders. An additional type labelled d) "protodiplomacy" implies actions motivated by separatist/secessionnist objectives - also framed as "sovereignty paradiplomacy" in the more recent typology proposed by Rodrigo Tavares. A comprising view of the phenomenon should also consider formal and informal contacts in a wide range of multilateral associations of local authorities, and their growing presence in global summits and governance instances.

Non-central governments may formally develop official international relations by: a) sending delegations in official visits; b) signing agreements, memoranda of understanding and other instruments; c) participating in international "local" fora; d) establishing permanent representative offices or delegations abroad.

Local governments seek international cooperation for a diversity of reasons, such as economic, cultural or political. They can engage in such actions within or parallel to the frame of national foreign policies, usually following principles of subsidiarity as local scales hold specific capacities in territorial management and planning that can complement national expertise.

In the cultural field, some regions may seek to promote themselves internationally as an autonomous cultural entity - a form of "identity paradiplomacy" as framed by Stephane Paquin. This can be the case for the Spanish autonomous communities of Catalonia and the Basque Country. Some regions may seek to cooperate with their diasporas worldwide and try to gain the support of their nationals abroad in attaining their diplomatic goals.

As to the political aspects, local governments may join efforts internationally to pressure their central governments into a desired course of action. This strategy is exemplified in the case of eight memoranda of understanding signed, in the years 1980, between three American states and three Canadian provinces to control and combat acid rain, as the Reagan Administration and the American Congress could not reach a consensus on the matter. The cross-borders paradiplomatic efforts eventually led Washington to amend the Clean Air Act in 1990 and to sign with Canada, in 1991, the US/Canada Air Quality Agreement in which both countries agree on a timetable to reduce acid emissions.

A particular kind of local political activism is called "protodiplomacy", through which a local government may seek international support for their emancipation or independence plans. This is typically the case of the Canadian province of Québec in the seventies, under the Parti Québécois.

Non-central governments may be allowed to negotiate and sign agreements with foreign non-central authorities or even with the government of a foreign state. Conditions can vary largely from a limited capacity to negotiate with the assistance of their central authorities to a most complete autonomy based on sovereign constitutional prerogatives. This can not be the object of the international law. Only the internal law of the states is to determine which internal powers are entitled to do so and to which extent. In some states, the outward relations of their non-central governments is a constitutional matter directly related to the issue of legal competence.

== Decentralized cooperation ==
The concept of decentralized cooperation is mostly in use in the European context and seen as an instrument of international development aid, although its precise definition can vary from country to country. It is generally understood as "aid extended by local and regional governments to reinforce capacities and service delivery in partner authorities". In France, it is framed within the "territorial collectivities' international action" and corresponds to bilateral partnerships formalized through conventions and agreements.

== City diplomacy ==
In recent years the term city diplomacy has gained increased usage and acceptance, particularly as a strand of paradiplomacy and public diplomacy. It is formally used in the workings of the United Cities and Local Governments and the C40 Cities Climate Leadership Group and recognised by the USC Center on Public Diplomacy. A March 2014 debate in the British House of Lords acknowledged the evolution of town twinning into city diplomacy, particularly around trade and tourism, but also in culture and post-conflict reconciliation. São Paulo has aggressively pursued ‘city-diplomacy’ and has not only become the first subnational government in the Southern Hemisphere to sign direct bilateral agreements with the United States and Britain. It has also been crowned Latin American State of the Future 2018–19.

== Federalism ==
Federative countries ordinarily set apart in their constitutions, when it comes to the internal division of powers, matters that are exclusive of the central authority. "National defense", "currency" and "external relations" are typically the case. However, as cross-border contacts become an imperative for sub-national communities, diplomacy is increasingly becoming a decentralized prerogative. Some states do formally recognize the stakes their political and administrative units have in foreign affairs and have, accordingly, set the required legal basis at a constitutional level. Legal provisions on this matter are present in the constitution of the following federations:

- Argentina
- Austria
- Belgium
- Germany
- Russian Federation
- Switzerland
- United States

== Paradiplomacy by country ==
Paradiplomacy being a very context-specific global phenomenon, the following section is not exhaustive and only illustrates a few examples linked to their national context.

=== Argentina ===
Since 1994, an amendment to the Constitución de la Republica allows the provinces of Argentina (articles 124 and 125) to establish treaties and agreements with foreign nations to the effect of the administration of justice, economic interest or common utility works. Those treaties are "partial" (non-political) and must not contravene national law, affect the nation's public credit nor go against the external policies of the Argentine nation. It must also be approved by the National Congress.

=== Austria ===
The Constitution of Austria restricts the states' capacity to establish formal external ties to cross-border issues. Article 16 of the reformed text (28. June 2002) allows the Länder (states) to conclude treaties with neighboring states or with its constituent states in matters of their constitutional competence. The governor of the Land must inform the federal government from whom he must obtain authorization before engaging in international negotiations. If the federal government fails to respond within eight weeks, the request will be deemed to have been approved. The approval, whether express or tacit, obliges the Federal President to the agreed text, which must be countersigned by a federal authority. However, upon request of the federal government, the Länder must denounce the treaty. If the Land does not dully complies with its obligation, the federal government overtakes the responsibility. Paragraphs 4 and 5 of Article 16 regulate further the competencies of the Länder and of the federal state in the implementation of treaties.

=== Belgium ===
In Belgium, a 1993 constitutional revision granted Regions and Communities the right to develop international co-operation, including the celebration of treaties, in matters of their exclusive competence (article 167 (3)). Cultural and educational matters are, according to article 127 (3), those fields of their exclusive competence. This faculty includes the drafting of treaties, which are ratified by the French and the Flemish Community Councils by decree (article 128 (1.1)). Article 130 (4) provides the same right to the German-speaking Community, and adds "personal issues" to its fields of competence. Since the Communities have acquired exclusive right to develop their international relations on those exclusive matters, the King cannot sign, ratify or denounce treaties on their behalf. Only treaties concluded before 18 May 1993 may be denounced by the King. The rigidity of sphere of competences raised legal difficulties to the approval of international treaties dealing with both federal and community's issues. These treaties are known as traités mixtes, and is the object of a co-operation agreement between the federal state, the Communities and the Regions (8 March 1994), which provides for a complex mechanism of shared responsibilities.

=== Bosnia and Herzegovina ===
The 1995 Dayton Agreement, which ended the Bosnian War, formally acknowledged the high degree of subsidiarily decentralised powers for two composite entities, including the right to establish special parallel relations with neighboring countries consistent with sovereignty and territorial integrity of Bosnia and Herzegovina. In 1997, Republika Srpska and what was then Federal Republic of Yugoslavia (Serbia and Montenegro) signed the Agreement on Special Parallel Relations, which after the 2006 independence of Montenegro led to development of Republika Srpska–Serbia relations. While not provided in the Dayton Agreement, since 2009 Republika Srpska has opened a number of representative offices in Moscow, Stuttgart, Jerusalem, Thessaloniki, Washington D.C., Brussels and Vienna. The policy was criticized by the Bosniak political representatives as further proof of efforts in the direction of a proposed secession of Republika Srpska.

=== Canada ===
Canadian provinces are among the most active sub-national units on the international stage. The total amount spent on diplomacy by the ten Canadian provinces is equal to that of the fifty American states, despite the fact Canada's population is one-ninth the size and the economy is only one-fourteenth as large. Canadian provinces are largely motivated by economic concerns, stemming from the high degree of economic diversity between regions of the country and because of Canada's integration into world markets, especially the US market via NAFTA. Nine of the ten provinces trade more with the United States than with the rest of Canada. Relations with major trading partners, most especially the United States, are the most important. At the same time, Quebec nationalism has motivated the French-speaking province of Quebec to pursue closer ties with France and the other members of la Francophonie. Furthermore, Canada's constitution is generally interpreted in a decentralist way, giving the provinces a great deal of responsibilities.

While Quebec has the strongest paradiplomatic presence, British Columbia and Saskatchewan formerly operated economic trade offices abroad. Nova Scotia operated a tourism office in Portland, Maine until 2009. Ontario formerly had representation in Boston, Atlanta, Chicago and Dallas; it continues to promote the province's industries from delegations in New York City and Los Angeles.

=== China ===
In spite of the active role Chinese provincial, municipal and district leaders play on the diplomatic field, these government officials do not act on behalf of local political groups or from a merely "local" perspective. They are indeed extensions of the central government, carrying out policies outlined by the Chinese Communist Party (CCP) as long as their interests are convergent with those of Beijing. This is evidenced by the fact that the internationalization of Chinese non-central governments was primarily a creative product of the international isolation of the Chinese central government caused by the 1989 Tiananmen Square protests and massacre. However, local particularities are to be heeded as well.

China's panda diplomacy, often organized by organizations such as the Chinese People's Association for Friendship with Foreign Countries, is a form of diplomacy at the local level that has grown as the country's relations with federal U.S. officials have cooled. Similar to ping-pong diplomacy in the 1970s, "pickleball diplomacy" has been cited as a form of sub-national diplomacy deployed by China on municipalities in the United States.

There is no text of law regulating diplomatic activities carried out by local authorities. Those relations are agreed upon among local governments, local permanent committees of the CCP and local Foreign Affairs Office (FAO), subordinated to the Ministry of Foreign Affairs. Diplomatic initiatives at the local level can be initiated and undertaken by any of those administrative bodies. Friendship associations, usually under the management of the FAOs, act to promote contacts with non-central governments abroad and organizing events on international cooperation. Twinning agreements are widely observed as a means to establish permanent links with non-central governments elsewhere.

=== Denmark ===
The Faroese Government has representative offices in Copenhagen, Brussels, London, Moscow and Reykjavik working closely with Danish embassies. The office in Brussels also acts a point of liaison with the European Union.

The Greenlandic Government has representative offices in Copenhagen, Brussels, Reykjavik and Washington, D.C., working closely with Danish embassies. The office in Brussels also acts a point of liaison with the European Union.

=== Germany ===
The Basic Law of Germany states in its article 32(3) that "Insofar as the Länder have power to legislate, they may, with the consent of the Federal Government, conclude treaties with foreign states". The federal government must consult with the Länder, "in sufficient time", before concluding an international treaty that affects the special interest of one or more Länder. Article 59(2) requires the consent or participation of the Bundesrat (the German senate), as one of the "bodies competent in any specific case", on the approval of Treaties "which regulate the political relations of the Federation or relate to matters of Federal legislation". The German Bundesrat has been especially keen to assure the participation of the Länder in the European decision-making process.

Each state has a Landesvertretung ('state representative office') in Berlin.

=== Russia and the Soviet Union ===
Russia, the world's most extensive state, shows a tradition of conveying the weight of its territorial units to foster external policy objectives. The Soviet Union is the only country ever to have subnational entities (the Ukrainian SSR and Byelorussian SSR) recognized as member states in the United Nations, which lasted from 1945 to 1991 (see: Ukraine and the UN). That situation was not to be reflected in constitutional law until the 1977 Soviet Constitution stipulated that a Union republic "has the right to enter into relations with other states, conclude treaties with them, exchange diplomatic and consular representatives, and take part in the work of international organizations" (article 80).

The 1993 Constitution of the Russian Federation does not explicitly confer its non-central authorities the same rights, but states in article 72 that "coordination of the international and external economic relations of the subjects of the Russian Federation" belongs to the joint jurisdiction of the Russian Federation and the subjects of the Russian Federation, and that this provision "shall equally apply to the republics, territories, regions, federal cities, the autonomous region and autonomous areas".

=== Switzerland ===
Article 54 of the Swiss Constitution states that foreign relations are a federal matter. However, the cantons shall be considered, having a say in the preparation of decisions of foreign policy concerning their competencies or their essential interests, whenever they are affected, and participate in international negotiations as appropriate, as stated in Article 55. The cantons may also conclude treaties with foreign countries within the domain relevant to their competencies, provided they are not contrary to the law and interests of the Federation nor to the right of other cantons. They may deal directly with subordinated foreign authorities, but treaties concluded with foreign nations can only be signed by the central authorities (Article 56). Article 147 reinforces the cantons' role in Swiss foreign affairs by stating that "the cantons (...) are heard in the course of the preparation of important decrees and other projects of substantial impact, and on important international treaties". Provisions concerning mandatory and optional referendums concerning the entry of Switzerland into organizations for collective security, into supranational communities or the implementation of some international treaties (Articles 140, 141 and 141a) may also imply cantonal participation if such referendum is proposed by eight cantons.

=== United Kingdom ===
The Scottish Government has offices in Beijing, Berlin, Brussels, Dublin, London, Paris and Washington D.C.

The Welsh Government operates trade missions, working closely with British embassies. The office in Brussels also acts a point of liaison with the European Union.

=== United States ===
Having established that the power to make treaties and conduct external affairs belong to the president and the Congress, the first federal constitution sets an array of prohibitions to the States in Section 10 of Article I. The states shall not "enter into any Treaty, Alliance, or Confederation". However, the third paragraph of the same Section 10 opens the possibility for the States to engage in international affairs by stating that "no State shall, without the Consent of Congress, [...] enter into any Agreement or Compact with another State, or with a foreign Power, or engage in War, unless actually invaded, or in such imminent Danger as will not admit of delay". A double negation ("no State shall, without the Consent of Congress") implies that they are actually allowed to "compact with a foreign Power", as long as the Congress sanctioned those acts. This control was meant to assure that international commitments contracted by the States were not against the federal law.

== See also ==
- De facto embassy
- Town twinning
