= Roberto Horcades Figueira =

Brazilian cardiologist and football chairman

Roberto Horcades Figueira (born April 19, 1947) is a Brazilian cardiologist. He is currently the chairman of Fluminense Football Club, and the vice-president of Clube dos 13.
