= Tony Figueira (footballer) =

Venezuela-born Portuguese footballer (born 1981)

Personal information
- Full name: José Antonio Pestana Figueira
- Date of birth: 1 August 1981 (age 45)
- Place of birth: Caracas, Venezuela
- Height: 1.81 m (5 ft 11 in)
- Position: Midfielder

Senior career*
Years	Team	Apps	(Gls)
2000–2001	Marítimo	1	(0)
2001–2005	CDRB		
2005–2008	Camacha		
2008–2012	União da Madeira	28	(0)
2012–2013	Santa Clara	38	(2)
2013–2014	União da Madeira	31	(0)
2014	Freamunde		
2015–2016	Pontassolense	1	(0)
2016–2017	Camacha	28	(2)
- * Club domestic league appearances and goals

José Antonio Pestana Figueira (born 1 August 1981), known as Tony Figueira, is a Venezuela-born Portuguese former footballer who played as a midfielder.

== Career ==
Tony Figueira made his professional debut in the Primeira Liga for Marítimo on 27 May 2001, when he came on as a 75th-minute substitute for Musa Shannon in a 0–1 loss against Sporting.
