= Tony Figueira (photographer) =

Namibian photographer

- Born: December 13, 1959; Angola
- Died: April 12, 2017 (aged 57)
- Occupation: Photographer

Tony Figueira (13 December 1959 in Huambo – 12 April 2017 in Swakopmund) was a Namibian photographer, journalist and businessman. He owned Studio 77, a design studio in Windhoek.

== Biography ==
Figueira was born in Huambo, Angola. The family moved to South West Africa when he was seven, and he attended St Paul's College in Windhoek. He studied journalism at Rhodes University in Grahamstown, South Africa, and graduated in 1984. As journalist, he worked for several radio stations including the Voice of America, and for anti-apartheid newspapers like The Rand Daily Mail. Concentrating on photojournalism Figueira became known for documenting key moments in contemporary Southern African history, for instance Nelson Mandela's post-apartheid visit to Robben Island, and Sam Nujoma's return from exile.

Figueira suffered from Multiple myeloma, which he ultimately died from on 12 April 2017, aged 57. The National Art Gallery of Namibia in April/May 2015 ran an exhibition to support him, titled For Tony.
