= Flag Day (disambiguation) =

Flag Day is a day to fly a flag of a certain area or a day set aside to honor an event specifically involving a national flag.

Flag Day may also refer to:

== National days ==
- Flag Day (Albania)
- Flag Day (Argentina)
- Flag Day (Australia)
- National Flag of Canada Day
- Armed Forces Flag Day, celebrated in India
- Flag Day (Mexico)
- Day of the National Flag (Russia)
- Day of the National Flag (Ukraine)
- Flag Day (United Arab Emirates)
- Flag Day (United States)

== Other uses ==
- Flag day (computing), a large change
- Flag Day (film), a 2021 film by Sean Penn
- Flag Day (Hong Kong), a day for charity fundraising - also practised in Singapore
- "Flag Day" (song), a song by The Housemartins

== See also ==
- Flag flying day
- State Flag Day (disambiguation)
