= November 3 =

November 3 this year in various calendars
- Tuesday, 3 November 2026
Akan	Nkyibene
Armenian	16 Trē 1476
Aztec	Atlcahualo 12, 12 Cōātl
Babylonian	21 Tashritu, 2337 SE
Balinese pawukon	Luang, Pepet, Kajeng, Jaya, Wage, Urukung, Anggara of Sinta, Guru, Dangu, Raja
Bengali	18 Kartik, BS 1433
Chinese	Yin Metal Snake・Turtle Beak Mansion; Fire Horse Year, Month 9, Day 25 (Shuangjiang, 4 days until Lidong)
Common Era	3 November 2026 CE
Coptic	24 Paopi, AM 1743
Egyptian	21 Phamenoth, 2775 NE
Ethiopian	24 Ṭeqemt, 2019 Amätä Məhrät
French Republican	Décade II, Duodi de Brumaire de l'Année 235 de la République
Gregorian	3 November, AD 2026
Hebrew	23 Cheshvan, AM 5787
Hindu	Āśleṣā・Śukla; Solar: 17 Kārtika, 1948 SE; Lunisolar: Navamī, Kṛishna pakṣa of Āśvina, 2083 VE; Rāudra・5127 KY・1,872,882
Icelandic	Þriðjudagur, 11 Gormánuður 2026
Islamic	22 Jumada al-awwal, AH 1448 (using tabular method)
ISO week date	2026-W45-2
Japanese	24 Nagatsuki, Reiwa 8 (Sōkō, 4 days until Rittō)
Julian	21 October, AD 2026 (AM 7535)
Julian day	2461348
Korean	24 Gaedal, 4359 DE
Maya	13.0.14.1.5; 18 Zac, 12 Chicchan
Roman	ante diem XII Kalendas Novembres, MMDCCLXXIX AUC
Solar Hijri	12 Aban, SH 1405
Tibetan	24 tha skar, me pho rta 2153 or 1772 or 1000

<<	November					>>
Su	Mo	Tu	We	Th	Fr	Sa
1	2	3	4	5	6	7
8	9	10	11	12	13	14
15	16	17	18	19	20	21
22	23	24	25	26	27	28
29	30
2026

November 3 in recent years
2026 (Tuesday)
2025 (Monday)
2024 (Sunday)
2023 (Friday)
2022 (Thursday)
2021 (Wednesday)
2020 (Tuesday)
2019 (Sunday)
2018 (Saturday)
2017 (Friday)

November 3 is the 307th day of the year (308th in leap years) in the Gregorian calendar; 58 days remain until the end of the year.

== Events ==
=== Pre-1600 ===
- 361 – Emperor Constantius II dies of a fever at Mopsuestia in Cilicia; on his deathbed he is baptised and declares his cousin Julian rightful successor.
- 1090 – The Rouen Riot, an attempt by English king William Rufus to take possession of Rouen, the capital city of his brother Robert, duke of Normandy, fails.
- 1333 – The River Arno floods causing massive damage in Florence as recorded by the Florentine chronicler Giovanni Villani.
- 1468 – Liège is sacked by the troops of Duke Charles the Bold of Burgundy.
- 1492 – Peace of Etaples between Henry VII of England and Charles VIII of France.
- 1493 – Christopher Columbus first sights the island of Dominica in the Caribbean Sea.
- 1534 – English Parliament passes the first Act of Supremacy, making King Henry VIII head of the Anglican Church, supplanting the pope and the Roman Catholic Church.

=== 1601–1900 ===
- 1783 – The American Continental Army is disbanded.
- 1791 – The University of Vermont, the oldest university in Vermont, and fifth-oldest in New England, is chartered.
- 1793 – French playwright, journalist and feminist Olympe de Gouges is guillotined.
- 1812 – Napoleon's armies are defeated at the Battle of Vyazma.
- 1817 – The Bank of Montreal, Canada's oldest chartered bank, opens in Montreal.
- 1838 – The Times of India, the world's largest circulated English language daily broadsheet newspaper is founded as The Bombay Times and Journal of Commerce.
- 1848 – A greatly revised Dutch constitution, which transfers much authority from the king to his parliament and ministers, is proclaimed.
- 1867 – Giuseppe Garibaldi and his followers are defeated in the Battle of Mentana and fail to end the Pope's Temporal power in Rome (it would be achieved three years later).
- 1868 – John Willis Menard (R-LA) becomes the first African American elected to the United States Congress. Because of an electoral challenge, he is never seated.
- 1881 – The Mapuche uprising of 1881 begins in Chile.
- 1898 – France withdraws its troops from Fashoda (now in Sudan), ending the Fashoda Incident.

=== 1901–present ===
- 1903 – With the encouragement of the United States, Panama separates from Colombia.
- 1908 – William Howard Taft is elected the 27th President of the United States.
- 1911 – Chevrolet officially enters the automobile market in competition with the Ford Model T.
- 1913 – The siege of Adrianople begins during the First Balkan War.
- 1918 – The German Revolution of 1918–19 begins when 40,000 sailors take over the port in Kiel.
- 1920 – Russian Civil War: The Russian Army retreats to Crimea, after a successful offensive by the Red Army and Revolutionary Insurgent Army of Ukraine.
- 1929 – The Gwangju Student Independence Movement occurred.
- 1930 – Getúlio Vargas becomes Head of the Provisional Government in Brazil after a bloodless coup on October 24.
- 1932 – Panagis Tsaldaris becomes the 142nd Prime Minister of Greece.
- 1935 – George II of Greece regains his throne through a popular, though possibly fixed, plebiscite.
- 1936 – Franklin D. Roosevelt is reelected as President of the United States.
- 1942 – World War II: The Koli Point action begins during the Guadalcanal campaign and ends on November 12.
- 1943 – World War II: Five hundred aircraft of the U.S. 8th Air Force devastate Wilhelmshaven harbor in Germany.
- 1944 – World War II: Two supreme commanders of the Slovak National Uprising, Generals Ján Golian and Rudolf Viest, are captured, tortured and later executed by German forces.
- 1946 – The Constitution of Japan is adopted through Emperor's assent.
- 1949 – Chinese Civil War: The Battle of Dengbu Island occurs.
- 1950 – Air India Flight 245 crashes into Mont Blanc while on approach to Geneva Airport, killing all 48 people on board.
- 1956 – Suez Crisis: The Khan Yunis killings by the Israel Defense Forces in Egyptian-controlled Gaza result in the deaths of 275 Palestinians.
- 1956 – Hungarian Revolution: A new Hungarian government is formed, in which many members of banned non-Communist parties participate. János Kádár and Ferenc Münnich form a counter-government in Moscow as Soviet troops prepare for the final assault.
- 1957 – Sputnik program: The Soviet Union launches Sputnik 2. On board is the first animal to enter orbit, a dog named Laika.
- 1960 – The land that would become the Great Swamp National Wildlife Refuge is established by an Act of Congress after a year-long legal battle that pitted local residents against Port Authority of New York and New Jersey officials wishing to turn the Great Swamp into a major regional airport for jet aircraft.
- 1961 – U Thant is unanimously appointed as the 3rd Secretary-General of the United Nations, becoming the first non-European individual to occupy the post.
- 1964 – Lyndon B. Johnson is elected to a full term as U.S. president, winning 61% of the vote and 44 states, while Washington D.C. residents are able to vote in a presidential election for the first time, casting the majority of their votes for Lyndon Johnson.
- 1967 – Vietnam War: The Battle of Dak To begins.
- 1969 – Vietnam War: U.S. President Richard Nixon addresses the nation on television and radio, asking the "silent majority" to join him in solidarity on the Vietnam War effort and to support his policies.
- 1973 – Mariner program: NASA launches the Mariner 10 toward Mercury. On March 29, 1974, it becomes the first space probe to reach that planet.
- 1975 – Four Bangladeshi politicians are killed in the Dhaka Central Jail.
- 1976 – Carrie, an American supernatural horror film directed by Brian De Palma, is premiered in 17 theaters in the Washington, D.C.-Baltimore area.
- 1978 – Dominica gains its independence from the United Kingdom.
- 1979 – Greensboro massacre: Five members of the Communist Workers Party are shot dead and seven are wounded by a group of Klansmen and neo-Nazis during a "Death to the Klan" rally in Greensboro, North Carolina, United States.
- 1980 – A Latin Carga Convair CV-880 crashes at Simón Bolívar International Airport in Venezuela, killing four.
- 1982 – The Salang Tunnel fire in Afghanistan kills 150–2,000 people.
- 1986 – Iran–Contra affair: The Lebanese magazine Ash-Shiraa reports that the United States has been secretly selling weapons to Iran in order to secure the release of seven American hostages held by pro-Iranian groups in Lebanon.
- 1986 – The Compact of Free Association becomes law, granting the Federated States of Micronesia and the Marshall Islands independence from the United States.
- 1988 – Sri Lankan Tamil mercenaries attempt to overthrow the Maldivian government. At President Maumoon Abdul Gayoom's request, the Indian military suppresses the rebellion within 24 hours.
- 1992 – Democratic Arkansas Governor Bill Clinton defeats Republican President George H. W. Bush and Independent candidate Ross Perot in the 1992 United States presidential election.
- 1994 – Space Shuttle program: Atlantis launches on STS-66.
- 1996 – Abdullah Çatlı, the leader of the Turkish ultranationalist organization Grey Wolves, dies in the Susurluk car crash, leading to the resignation of Interior Minister Mehmet Ağar (a leader of the True Path Party).
- 1997 – The United States imposes economic sanctions against Sudan in response to its human rights abuses of its own citizens and its material and political assistance to Islamic extremist groups across the Middle East and East Africa.
- 2014 – One World Trade Center officially opens in New York City, replacing the Twin Towers after they were destroyed during the September 11 attacks.
- 2016 – The Chicago Cubs beat the Cleveland Indians in the World Series, ending the team's 108-year-long title drought.
- 2020 – The 2020 United States presidential election takes place between Democratic Joe Biden and Republican incumbent President Donald Trump. On November 7, Biden was declared the winner.

== Births ==
=== Pre-1600 ===
- AD 39 – Lucan, Roman poet (died 65)
- 1500 – Benvenuto Cellini, Italian sculptor and painter (died 1571)
- 1505 – Achilles Gasser, German physician and astrologer (died 1577)
- 1527 – Tilemann Heshusius, Gnesio-Lutheran theologian (died 1588)
- 1560 – Annibale Carracci, Italian painter and illustrator (died 1609)
- 1587 – Samuel Scheidt, German organist, composer, and educator (died 1654)

=== 1601–1900 ===
- 1604 – Osman II, Ottoman sultan (died 1622)
- 1618 – Aurangzeb, Mughal emperor of India (died 1707)
- 1656 – Georg Reutter, Austrian organist and composer (died 1738)
- 1659 – Huibin Jang, Royal consort (died 1701)
- 1689 – Jan Josef Ignác Brentner, Czech composer (died 1742)
- 1749 – Daniel Rutherford, Scottish chemist and physician (died 1819)
- 1757 – Robert Smith, American soldier, lawyer, and politician, 6th United States Secretary of State (died 1842)
- 1777 – Princess Sophia of the United Kingdom (died 1848)
- 1793 – Stephen F. Austin, American businessman and politician (died 1836)
- 1794 – William Cullen Bryant, American poet and journalist (died 1878)
- 1799 – William Sprague III, American lawyer and politician, 14th governor of Rhode Island (died 1856)
- 1801 – Karl Baedeker, German author and publisher, founded the Baedeker Publishing Company (died 1859)
- 1801 – Vincenzo Bellini, Italian composer (died 1835)
- 1815 – John Mitchel, Irish journalist and activist (died 1875)
- 1816 – Jubal Early, American general and lawyer (died 1894)
- 1816 – Calvin Fairbank, American minister and activist (died 1898)
- 1841 – Eugenius Warming, Danish botanist (plant ecology, environment-organism interactions) (died 1924)
- 1845 – Edward Douglass White, American lawyer, jurist, and politician, 9th Chief Justice of the United States (died 1921)
- 1852 – Emperor Meiji of Japan (died 1912)
- 1854 – Carlo Fornasini, Italian micropalaeontologist (died 1931)
- 1856 – Jim McCormick, Scottish-American baseball player and manager (died 1918)
- 1857 – Mikhail Alekseyev, Russian general (died 1918)
- 1862 – Henry George Jr., American journalist and politician (died 1916)
- 1863 – Alfred Perot, French physicist and academic (died 1925)
- 1866 – Harry Staley, American baseball player (died 1910)
- 1871 – Albert Goldthorpe, English rugby player and manager (died 1943)
- 1872 – Wilfred Trotter, English pioneer in neurosurgery, authority in cancers of the head and neck, popularized the concept of herd instinct (died 1939)
- 1875 – Emīls Dārziņš, Latvian composer and conductor (died 1910)
- 1876 – Stephen Alencastre, American bishop and missionary (died 1940)
- 1877 – Carlos Ibáñez del Campo, Chilean general and politician, 20th President of Chile (died 1960)
- 1877 – Rosalie Edge, American environmentalist (died 1962)
- 1878 – Bangalore Nagarathnamma, Indian Carnatic singer and activist (died 1952)
- 1879 – Vilhjalmur Stefansson, Canadian-American Arctic explorer and ethnologist (died 1961)
- 1882 – Yakub Kolas, Belarusian writer (died 1956)
- 1884 – Joseph William Martin Jr., American publisher and politician, 49th Speaker of the United States House of Representatives (died 1968)
- 1887 – Samuil Marshak, Russian author and poet (died 1964)
- 1887 – Eileen Hendriks, British geologist (died 1978)
- 1890 – Harry Stephen Keeler, American author (died 1967)
- 1890 – Eustáquio van Lieshout, Dutch-Brazilian priest and missionary (died 1943)
- 1894 – William George Barker, Canadian pilot and colonel, Victoria Cross recipient (died 1930)
- 1894 – Sofoklis Venizelos, Greek captain and politician, 133rd Prime Minister of Greece (died 1964)
- 1896 – Gustaf Tenggren, Swedish-American illustrator and animator (died 1970)
- 1899 – Ralph Greenleaf, American billiards player (died 1950)
- 1899 – Rezső Seress, Hungarian pianist and composer (died 1968)
- 1899 – Gleb Wataghin, Ukrainian-Italian physicist and academic (died 1986)
- 1900 – Adolf Dassler, German businessman, founded Adidas (died 1978)

=== 1901–present ===
- 1901 – Leopold III of Belgium (died 1983)
- 1901 – André Malraux, French historian, theorist, and author (died 1976)
- 1901 – Lionel Hitchman, Canadian ice hockey player (died 1969)
- 1903 – Walker Evans, American photographer and journalist (died 1975)
- 1905 – Lois Mailou Jones, American painter and academic (died 1998)
- 1908 – Giovanni Leone, Italian lawyer and politician, 6th President of Italy (died 2001)
- 1909 – James Reston, Scottish-American journalist and author (died 1995)
- 1910 – Karel Zeman, Czech director, animator, production designer, and screenwriter (died 1989)
- 1911 – Kick Smit, Dutch footballer and manager (died 1974)
- 1912 – Alfredo Stroessner, Paraguayan general and politician, 46th President of Paraguay (died 2006)
- 1915 – Hal Jackson, American journalist and radio host (died 2012)
- 1917 – Annapurna Maharana, Indian activist (died 2012)
- 1918 – Claude Barma, French director, producer, and screenwriter (died 1992)
- 1918 – Bob Feller, American HOF baseball pitcher (died 2010)
- 1918 – Elizabeth P. Hoisington, American general (died 2007)
- 1918 – Russell B. Long, American lieutenant, lawyer, and politician (died 2003)
- 1919 – Jesús Blasco, Spanish author and illustrator (died 1995)
- 1919 – Ludovic Kennedy, Scottish journalist and author (died 2009)
- 1919 – Květa Legátová, Czech author (died 2012)
- 1920 – Oodgeroo Noonuccal, Australian poet, educator, and activist (died 1993)
- 1921 – Charles Bronson, American actor (died 2003)
- 1922 – Dennis McDermott, English-Canadian union leader and diplomat, Canadian Ambassador to Ireland (died 2003)
- 1923 – Violetta Elvin, Russian ballerina (died 2021)
- 1923 – Tomás Ó Fiaich, Irish cardinal (died 1990)
- 1923 – Hitomi Yamaguchi, Japanese author and critic (died 1995)
- 1924 – Marc Breaux, American actor, director, and choreographer (died 2013)
- 1924 – Samuel Ruiz, Mexican bishop (died 2011)
- 1926 – Valdas Adamkus, Lithuanian engineer and politician, 3rd President of Lithuania
- 1926 – Maurice Couture, Canadian archbishop (died 2018)
- 1926 – Robert W. Wilson, American businessman and philanthropist (died 2013)
- 1927 – Harrison McCain, Canadian businessman, co-founded McCain Foods (died 2004)
- 1927 – Peggy McCay, American actress (died 2018)
- 1927 – Odvar Nordli, Norwegian politician, 21st Prime Minister of Norway (died 2018)
- 1928 – Goseki Kojima, Japanese illustrator (died 2000)
- 1928 – Bill Morrison, Australian politician and diplomat, 37th Australian Minister for Defence (died 2013)
- 1928 – Osamu Tezuka, Japanese animator and producer (died 1989)
- 1928 – George Yardley, American basketball player (died 2004)
- 1929 – Alfonso Orueta, Chilean footballer, manager, and politician (died 2012)
- 1930 – Phil Crane, American academic and politician (died 2014)
- 1930 – William H. Dana, American engineer, pilot, and astronaut (died 2014)
- 1930 – Mable John, American blues singer (died 2022)
- 1930 – D. James Kennedy, American pastor and author (died 2007)
- 1930 – Brian Robinson, English cyclist (died 2022)
- 1930 – Tsutomu Seki, Japanese astronomer and academic
- 1930 – Lois Smith, American actress
- 1930 – Frits Staal, Dutch philosopher and scholar (died 2012)
- 1931 – Yon Hyong-muk, North Korean soldier and politician, 7th Premier of North Korea (died 2005)
- 1931 – Monica Vitti, Italian actress, singer, and screenwriter (died 2022)
- 1931 – Michael Fu Tieshan, Chinese bishop (died 2007)
- 1932 – Albert Reynolds, Irish businessman and politician, 9th Taoiseach of Ireland (died 2014)
- 1932 – Gerry Ehman, Canadian ice hockey player (died 2006)
- 1933 – Amartya Sen, Indian economist and academic, Nobel Prize laureate
- 1933 – Michael Dukakis, American governor and presidential nominee
- 1934 – Kenneth Baker, Baron Baker of Dorking, English poet and politician, Chancellor of the Duchy of Lancaster
- 1934 – Hans Janmaat, Dutch businessman, educator, and politician (died 2002)
- 1935 – Ingrid Rüütel, Estonian philologist and academic, 3rd First Lady of Estonia
- 1936 – Roy Emerson, Australian-American tennis player and coach
- 1936 – Takao Saito, Japanese author and illustrator, created Golgo 13 (died 2021)
- 1937 – Dietrich Möller, German lawyer and politician, 15th Mayor of Marburg
- 1937 – Jim Houston, American football player (died 2018)
- 1938 – Martin Dunwoody, English mathematician and academic
- 1938 – Akira Kobayashi, Japanese actor
- 1938 – Jean Rollin, French actor, director, and screenwriter (died 2010)
- 1938 – Shao Yu-ming, Taiwanese politician (died 2026)
- 1940 – Sonny Rhodes, American singer-songwriter and guitarist (died 2021)
- 1942 – Martin Cruz Smith, American author and screenwriter (died 2025)
- 1943 – Bert Jansch, Scottish-English singer-songwriter and guitarist (died 2011)
- 1944 – Jan Boerstoel, Dutch poet and songwriter
- 1945 – Ken Holtzman, American baseball player and manager (died 2024)
- 1945 – Gerd Müller, German footballer and manager (died 2021)
- 1945 – Nick Simper, English bass guitarist
- 1946 – Reinhard Karl, German mountaineer, photographer, and author (died 1982)
- 1946 – Wataru Takeshita, Japanese lawyer and politician (died 2021)
- 1947 – Mazie Hirono, Japanese-American lawyer and politician, U.S. Senator from Hawaii
- 1947 – Siiri Oviir, Estonian lawyer and politician, 3rd Estonian Minister of Social Affairs
- 1947 – Faraj Sarkohi, Iranian journalist and critic
- 1948 – Takashi Kawamura, Japanese politician
- 1948 – Helmut Koinigg, Austrian race car driver (died 1974)
- 1948 – Rick Kreuger, American baseball player and coach
- 1948 – Lulu, Scottish singer-songwriter and actress
- 1948 – Rainer Zobel, German footballer, coach, and manager
- 1948 – Mahbubul Haque, Bangladeshi linguist (died 2024)
- 1949 – Mike Evans, American actor and screenwriter (died 2006)
- 1949 – Osamu Fujimura, Japanese engineer and politician
- 1949 – Larry Holmes, American boxer and talk show host
- 1949 – Stephen Oliver, English biochemist and academic
- 1949 – Anna Wintour, English-American magazine editor-in-chief of American Vogue (1988-2025)
- 1950 – Massimo Mongai, Italian journalist and author (died 2016)
- 1950 – Joe Queenan, American author and critic
- 1951 – Dwight Evans, American baseball player and coach
- 1951 – Ed Murawinski, American cartoonist
- 1951 – André Wetzel, Dutch footballer and manager
- 1952 – Roseanne Barr, American comedienne and TV star (Roseanne)
- 1952 – Jim Cummings, American voice actor
- 1952 – Larry Fink, co-founder, chairman, and CEO of BlackRock
- 1952 – David Ho, Taiwanese-American scientist
- 1953 – Helios Creed, American singer-songwriter and guitarist
- 1953 – Larry Herndon, American baseball player and coach
- 1953 – Claire van Kampen, English director and composer (died 2025)
- 1953 – Vilma Santos, Filipino actress and politician
- 1955 – Teresa De Sio, Italian singer-songwriter and guitarist
- 1955 – Anne Milton, English nurse and politician
- 1956 – Cathy Jamieson, Scottish politician, 2nd Scottish Minister for Justice
- 1956 – Kevin Murphy, American actor, puppeteer, producer, and screenwriter
- 1956 – Gary Ross, American director, producer, and screenwriter
- 1956 – Bob Welch, American baseball player and coach (died 2014)
- 1956 – Chrystian, Brazilian sertanejo singer (died 2024)
- 1957 – Gary Olsen, English actor (died 2000)
- 1957 – Steve Johnson, American basketball player
- 1958 – Brady Hoke, American football coach
- 1959 – Hal Hartley, American director, producer, and screenwriter
- 1960 – Karch Kiraly, American volleyball player, coach, and sportscaster
- 1960 – Ian McNabb, English singer-songwriter and musician
- 1961 – David Armstrong-Jones, 2nd Earl of Snowdon, English businessman
- 1961 – Dave Hahn, Japanese-American mountaineer and journalist
- 1961 – Greg Townsend, American football player
- 1962 – Gabe Newell, American businessman, co-founded Valve
- 1962 – David J. Schiappa, American lawyer and politician
- 1962 – Jacqui Smith, English lawyer and politician
- 1963 – Davis Guggenheim, American director, producer, and screenwriter
- 1963 – Shigeaki Hattori, Japanese race car driver
- 1963 – Ian Wright, English footballer, manager, and sportscaster
- 1963 – Howard Ballard, American football player
- 1964 – Algimantas Briaunis, Lithuanian footballer and manager
- 1964 – Bryan Young, New Zealand cricketer
- 1965 – Gert Heerkes, Dutch footballer and manager
- 1965 – Ann Scott, French-English author
- 1965 – Mike Springer, American golfer
- 1967 – Mike O'Neill, Canadian ice hockey player
- 1967 – Mark Roberts, Welsh singer and guitarist
- 1967 – Steven Wilson, English singer-songwriter, guitarist, and producer
- 1968 – Alberto Iñurrategi, Spanish mountaineer
- 1968 – Paul Quantrill, Canadian baseball player and coach
- 1969 – Robert Miles, Swiss-Italian DJ and producer (died 2017)
- 1969 – Petteri Orpo, Finnish politician
- 1969 – Niels van Steenis, Dutch rower
- 1970 – Geir Frigård, Norwegian footballer
- 1970 – Jeanette J. Epps, American aerospace engineer and astronaut
- 1970 – Doug Zmolek, American ice hockey player
- 1971 – Diego Alessi, Italian race car driver
- 1971 – Unai Emery, Spanish football manager and former player
- 1971 – Dylan Moran, Irish actor, comedian, and screenwriter
- 1971 – Alison Williamson, English archer
- 1971 – Dwight Yorke, Tobagonian footballer and coach
- 1972 – Armando Benitez, Dominican baseball player
- 1972 – Ugo Ehiogu, English footballer and manager (died 2017)
- 1972 – Annette Gozon-Valdes, Filipino businesswoman, producer, and lawyer
- 1972 – Michael Hofmann, German footballer
- 1972 – Marko Koers, Dutch runner
- 1973 – Ben Fogle, English television host and author
- 1973 – Sticky Fingaz, American rapper, producer, and actor
- 1973 – Christian Picciolini, American businessman and manager
- 1973 – Chrissie Swan, Australian radio and television host
- 1973 – Mick Thomson, American guitarist
- 1974 – Tariq Abdul-Wahad, French basketball player and coach
- 1975 – Darren Sharper, American football player and sportscaster
- 1976 – Guillermo Franco, Argentinian-Mexican footballer
- 1976 – Jake Shimabukuro, American ukulele player and composer
- 1977 – Marcel Ketelaer, German footballer
- 1977 – Greg Plitt, American model and actor (died 2015)
- 1977 – Damien Woody, American football player
- 1978 – Tim McIlrath, American singer-songwriter and guitarist
- 1978 – Jonas Howden Sjøvaag, Norwegian drummer
- 1978 – Hiroko Sakai, Japanese softball player
- 1979 – Pablo Aimar, Argentinian footballer
- 1979 – Beau McDonald, Australian footballer and coach
- 1980 – Hans Andersen, Danish motorcycle racer
- 1981 – Diego López, Spanish footballer
- 1981 – Vicente Matías Vuoso, Argentinian-Mexican footballer
- 1981 – Rodrigo Millar, Chilean footballer
- 1981 – Sten Pentus, Estonian race car driver
- 1981 – Karlos Dansby, American football player
- 1982 – Jay Harrison, Canadian ice hockey player
- 1982 – Moniek Kleinsman, Dutch speed skater
- 1982 – Egemen Korkmaz, Turkish footballer
- 1982 – Janel McCarville, American professional basketball player
- 1982 – John Shuster, American Olympic curler
- 1982 – Pekka Rinne, Finnish ice hockey player
- 1982 – Alexander Svitov, Russian ice hockey player
- 1983 – Tamba Hali, American football player
- 1984 – Christian Bakkerud, Danish race car driver (died 2011)
- 1984 – Ryo Nishikido, Japanese singer-songwriter and actor
- 1984 – LaMarr Woodley, American football player
- 1985 – Tyler Hansbrough, American basketball player
- 1985 – Philipp Tschauner, German footballer
- 1986 – Paul Derbyshire, Italian rugby player
- 1986 – Davon Jefferson, American basketball player
- 1986 – Piet Velthuizen, Dutch footballer
- 1986 – Heo Young-saeng, South Korean singer
- 1987 – Courtney Barnett, Australian singer-songwriter and guitarist
- 1987 – Colin Kaepernick, American former NFL quarterback (protest kneel during national anthem; SF 49ers)
- 1987 – Ty Lawson, American basketball player
- 1987 – Felix Schütz, German ice hockey player
- 1987 – Kyle Seager, American baseball player
- 1988 – Diante Garrett, American basketball player
- 1988 – Jessie Loutit, Canadian rower
- 1989 – Paula DeAnda, American singer-songwriter and actress
- 1989 – Andrade El Idolo, Mexican wrestler
- 1989 – Joyce Jonathan, French singer-songwriter and guitarist
- 1990 – Ellyse Perry, Australian footballer and cricketer
- 1991 – Damisha Croney, Barbadian netball player
- 1992 – Joe Clarke, English slalom canoeist
- 1992 – Valeria Solovyeva, Russian tennis player
- 1993 – Kenny Golladay, American football player
- 1993 – Lee Min-hyuk, South Korean singer and MC
- 1993 – Martina Trevisan, Italian tennis player
- 1995 – Matt Bushman, American football player
- 1995 – Kendall Jenner, American model and socialite
- 1997 – Izuchuckwu Anthony, Nigerian footballer
- 1997 – Sarthak Golui, Indian footballer
- 1997 – Takumi Kitamura, Japanese actor
- 1997 – Lázaro Martínez, Cuban athlete
- 1998 – Maddison Elliott, Australian paralympic swimmer
- 2001 – Hailey Baptiste, American tennis player
- 2001 – Jake LaRavia, American basketball player
- 2005 – Fina Strazza, American actress
- 2005 – Lara Raj, American singer

== Deaths ==
=== Pre-1600 ===
- 361 – Constantius II, Roman emperor (born 317)
- 753 – Saint Pirmin, Spanish-German monk and saint (born 700)
- 1219 – Saer de Quincy, 1st Earl of Winchester, English baron and rebel (born c. 1170)
- 1220 – Urraca of Castile, Queen of Portugal, spouse of King Afonso II of Portugal (born 1186)
- 1254 – John III Doukas Vatatzes, Byzantine emperor (born 1193)
- 1324 – Petronilla de Meath, Irish suspected witch (born c. 1300)
- 1373 – Jeanne de Valois, Queen of Navarre (born 1343)
- 1428 – Thomas Montacute, 4th Earl of Salisbury, English general and politician (born 1388)
- 1456 – Edmund Tudor, 1st Earl of Richmond, father of King Henry VII of England (born 1431)
- 1580 – Jerónimo Zurita y Castro, Spanish historian and author (born 1512)
- 1584 – Charles Borromeo, Italian cardinal and saint (born 1538)
- 1599 – Andrew Báthory, Prince of Transylvania (born c. 1563)
- 1600 – Richard Hooker, English priest and theologian (born 1554)

=== 1601–1900 ===
- 1639 – Martin de Porres, Peruvian saint (born 1579)
- 1643 – John Bainbridge, English astronomer and academic (born 1582)
- 1643 – Paul Guldin, Swiss astronomer and mathematician (born 1577)
- 1676 – Köprülü Fazıl Ahmed Pasha, Ottoman soldier and politician, 110th Grand Vizier of the Ottoman Empire (born 1635)
- 1711 – John Ernest Grabe, German theologian and academic (born 1666)
- 1787 – Robert Lowth, English bishop and academic (born 1710)
- 1793 – Olympe de Gouges, French playwright and activist (born 1748)
- 1794 – François-Joachim de Pierre de Bernis, French cardinal and diplomat (born 1715)
- 1845 – Johan Gijsbert Verstolk van Soelen, Dutch Minister of Foreign Affairs (born 1776)
- 1850 – William E. Shannon, Irish-born American politician (born 1821/1822)
- 1858 – Harriet Taylor Mill, English philosopher and author (born 1807)
- 1869 – Andreas Kalvos, Greek poet and playwright (born 1792)
- 1890 – Ulrich Ochsenbein, Swiss lawyer and politician, 1st President of the Swiss National Council (born 1811)
- 1891 – Louis Lucien Bonaparte, English-Italian philologist and politician (born 1813)
- 1900 – Carrie Steele Logan, American philanthropist, founder of the oldest black orphanage in the United States (born ~1829)

=== 1901–present ===
- 1914 – Georg Trakl, Austrian-Polish pharmacist and poet (born 1887)
- 1917 – Léon Bloy, French author and poet (born 1846)
- 1918 – Aleksandr Lyapunov, Russian mathematician and physicist (born 1857)
- 1926 – Annie Oakley, American entertainer and target shooter (born 1860)
- 1927 – Karel Matěj Čapek-Chod, Czech journalist and author (born 1860)
- 1929 – Olav Aukrust, Norwegian poet and educator (born 1883)
- 1933 – Pierre Paul Émile Roux, French physician, bacteriologist, and immunologist (born 1853)
- 1939 – Charles Tournemire, French organist and composer (born 1870)
- 1949 – Solomon R. Guggenheim, American art collector and philanthropist, founded the Solomon R. Guggenheim Museum (born 1861)
- 1954 – Henri Matisse, French painter and sculptor (born 1869)
- 1956 – Jean Metzinger, French artist, (born 1883)
- 1957 – Wilhelm Reich, Ukrainian-Austrian psychotherapist and author (born 1897)
- 1960 – Paul Willis, American actor and director (born 1901)
- 1962 – L. O. Wenckebach, Dutch sculptor and painter (born 1895)
- 1968 – Vern Stephens, American baseball player (born 1920)
- 1969 – Zeki Rıza Sporel, Turkish footballer (born 1898)
- 1973 – Marc Allégret, Swiss-French director and screenwriter (born 1900)
- 1975 – Tajuddin Ahmad, Bangladeshi politician, 1st Prime Minister of Bangladesh (born 1925)
- 1975 – Muhammad Mansur Ali, Bangladeshi captain and politician, 3rd Prime Minister of Bangladesh (born 1919)
- 1975 – Syed Nazrul Islam, Bangladeshi lawyer and politician, President of Bangladesh (born 1925)
- 1975 – Abul Hasnat Muhammad Qamaruzzaman, Bangladeshi lawyer and politician (born 1926)
- 1976 – Solange d'Ayen, French noblewoman, Duchess of Ayen and journalist (born 1898)
- 1980 – Caroline Mytinger, American painter and author (born 1897)
- 1983 – Alfredo Antonini, Italian-American conductor and composer (born 1901)
- 1983 – Jerry Pentland, Australian fighter ace (born 1894)
- 1987 – Mary Shane, American sportscaster and educator (born 1945)
- 1988 – Henri van Praag, Dutch philosopher, theologian, and educator (born 1916)
- 1989 – Dorothy Fuldheim, American journalist (born 1893)
- 1990 – Kenan Erim, Turkish archaeologist and academic (born 1929)
- 1990 – Nusret Fişek, Turkish physician and politician, Turkish Minister of Health (born 1914)
- 1990 – Mary Martin, American actress and singer (born 1913)
- 1991 – Chris Bender, American singer (born 1972)
- 1992 – Freddie Moore, American jazz drummer, washboarder, and singer (born 1900)
- 1993 – Léon Theremin, Russian physicist and engineer, invented the Theremin (born 1895)
- 1994 – Valter Palm, Estonian-American boxer (born 1905)
- 1995 – Gordon S. Fahrni, Canadian physician (born 1887)
- 1996 – Jean-Bédel Bokassa, Central African general and politician, 2nd President of the Central African Republic (born 1921)
- 1997 – Ronald Barnes, American carillon player and composer (born 1927)
- 1998 – Bob Kane, American author and illustrator, co-created Batman (born 1915)
- 1999 – Ian Bannen, Scottish actor (born 1928)
- 2001 – Ernst Gombrich, Austrian-English historian and author (born 1909)
- 2002 – Lonnie Donegan, Scottish singer-songwriter and guitarist (born 1931)
- 2002 – Jonathan Harris, American actor (born 1914)
- 2003 – Rasul Gamzatov, Russian poet and educator (born 1923)
- 2004 – Sergejs Žoltoks, Latvian ice hockey player (born 1972)
- 2006 – Paul Mauriat, French pianist, composer, and conductor (born 1925)
- 2006 – Alberto Spencer, Ecuadorian-Uruguayan footballer (born 1937)
- 2007 – Aleksandr Dedyushko, Belarusian-Russian actor (born 1962)
- 2008 – Jean Fournet, French conductor (born 1913)
- 2009 – Francisco Ayala, Spanish sociologist, author, and critic (born 1906)
- 2010 – Jerry Bock, American composer (born 1928)
- 2010 – Viktor Chernomyrdin, Russian politician and diplomat, 30th Prime Minister of Russia (born 1938)
- 2011 – Peeter Kreitzberg, Estonian lawyer and politician (born 1948)
- 2012 – Tommy Godwin, American-English cyclist and coach (born 1920)
- 2013 – Gerard Cieślik, Polish footballer and manager (born 1927)
- 2014 – Gordon Tullock, American economist and academic (born 1922)
- 2014 – Sadashiv Amrapurkar, Indian actor (born 1950)
- 2015 – Ahmed Chalabi, Iraqi businessman and politician (born 1944)
- 2016 – Kay Starr, American singer (born 1922)
- 2018 – Sondra Locke, American actress and director (born 1944)
- 2024 – Quincy Jones, American producer (born 1933)
- 2025 – Dick Cheney, American businessman and politician, 46th Vice President of the United States (born 1941)
- 2025 – Kim Yong-nam, North Korean politician (born 1928)

== Holidays and observances ==
- Christian feast day:
  - Acepsimas of Hnaita and companions (Greek Orthodox Church)
  - Alpaïs of Cudot
  - Elias I of Antioch (Syriac Orthodox Church)
  - Ermengol (Hermengaudius)
  - Gaudiosus of Tarazona
  - Gwenhael
  - Hubertus
  - Ida of Toggenburg
  - Libertine
  - Blessed Manuel Lozano Garrido
  - Martin de Porres
  - Papulus
  - Pirmin
  - Richard Hooker (Anglican Communion)
  - Blessed Rupert Mayer
  - Silvia
  - November 3 (Eastern Orthodox liturgics)
- Culture Day (Japan)
- Flag Day (United Arab Emirates)
- Independence Day / Separation Day, celebrates the separation and independence of Panama from Colombia in 1903.
- Independence Day, celebrates the independence of Dominica from the United Kingdom in 1978.
- Independence Day, celebrates the independence of the Federated States of Micronesia from the United States in 1986.
- Independence Day of Cuenca (Ecuador)
- Mother's Day (East Timor)
- Victory Day (Maldives)
