= Republika Srpska–Serbia relations =

- Republika Srpska: Serbia

Republika Srpska, one of the two entities in Bosnia and Herzegovina, and Serbia maintain relations established in 1997.

== History ==
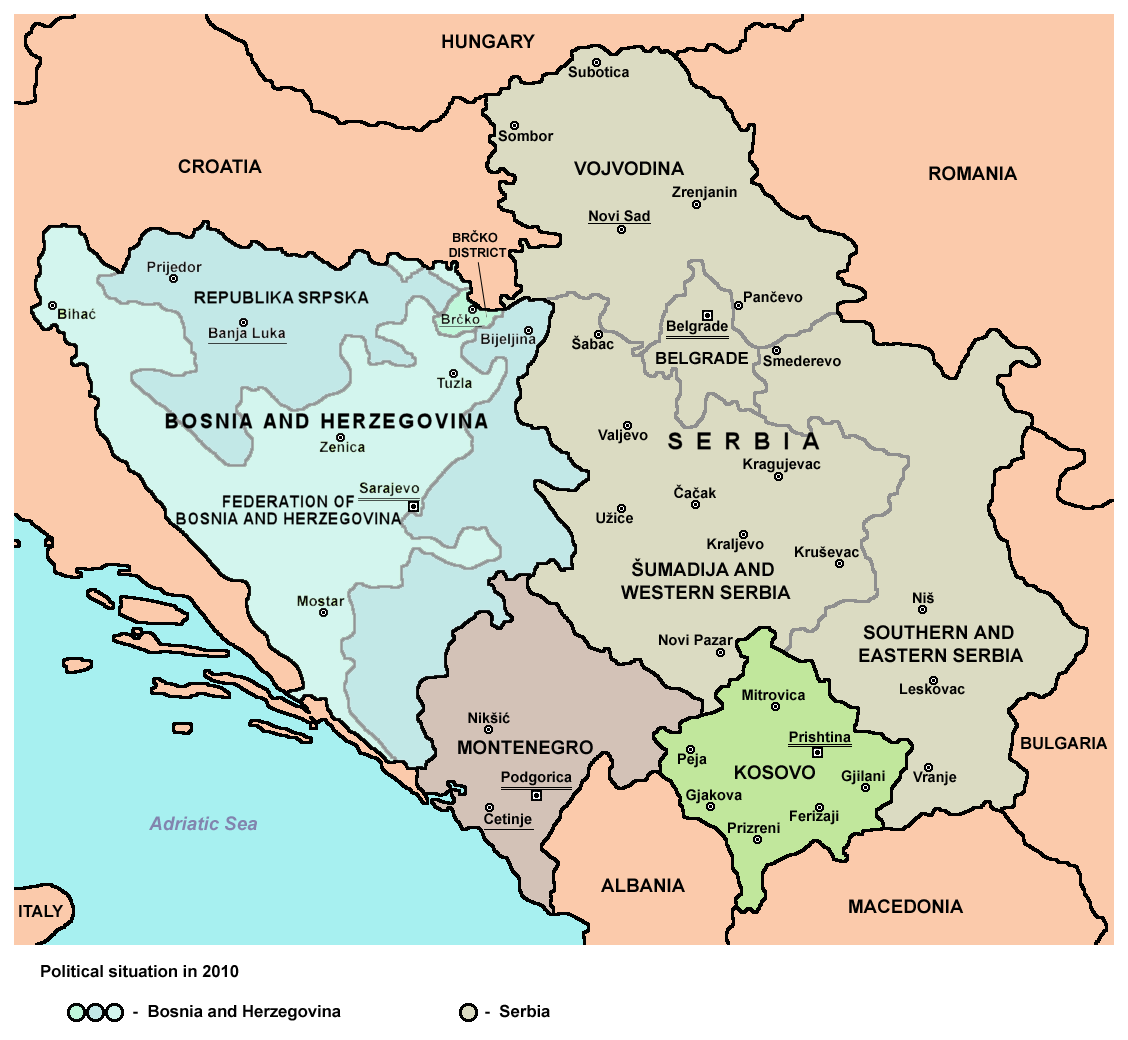
Map depicting Republika Srpska within Bosnia and Herzegovina, and the Serbia to its east

The beginnings of, at the time, informal relations between Republika Srpska and Serbia, can be traced to the formation of Republika Srpska in 1991. Serbia’s political support for Bosnian Serbs, and Republika Srpska for that matter, during the Bosnian War was extensive, encompassing diplomatic advocacy, military aid, and economic assistance. At the Dayton Agreement, the President of Serbia Slobodan Milošević represented Republika Srpska's interests due to the absence of Radovan Karadžić. The Dayton Agreement ensured the right for entities in Bosnia and Herzegovina to establish special parallel relationships with neighboring countries consistent with the sovereignty and territorial integrity of Bosnia and Herzegovina.

Republika Srpska supports the position of Serbia in the dispute over Kosovo. In 2008 Republika Srpska adopted a resolution through which it denounced and refused to recognise the declaration of independence of Kosovo from Serbia. In addition, the parliament adopted a resolution stating that in the event that a majority of EU and UN states recognise Kosovo's independence, Republika Srpska would cite the Kosovo secession as a precedent and move to hold a referendum on its own constitutional status within Bosnia and Herzegovina. Finally, the resolution called upon all Republika Srpska officials to do everything possible in order to prevent Bosnia and Herzegovina from recognising Kosovo's declaration of independence.

An All-Serb Assembly between Srpska and Serbia was held in 2024 in Belgrade. The Declaration on Protection of National, Political Rights, Common Future of Serbian People was adopted.

== Agreement on Special Parallel Relations ==
An Agreement on Special Parallel Relations was signed in 1997 and its implementation began in 2010. A significant number of formal and informal meetings between representatives of both sides have been organized several times a year.

== Resident diplomatic missions ==
- Republika Srpska has a Representative Office in Belgrade.
- Serbia has a consulate-general in Banja Luka and consular offices in Trebinje.

== See also ==
- Bosnia and Herzegovina–Serbia relations
- Foreign relations of Bosnia and Herzegovina
- Foreign relations of Serbia
- Politics of Republika Srpska
- Proposed secession of Republika Srpska
