= Public holidays in Serbia =

The public holidays in Serbia are defined by the Law of national and other holidays in the Republic of Serbia.

== Public holidays ==
Public Holidays
Date	Name	Serbian name (Cyrillic)	Serbian name (Latin)	Remarks
1 January^{1}	New Year's Day	Нова година	Nova godina	
2 January^{1}	New Year's Day	Нова година	Nova godina	
7 January	Christmas Day	Божић	Božić	Serbian Orthodox Church uses the Julian calendar
15 February^{1}	Statehood Day	Дан државности	Dan državnosti	Anniversary of the First Serbian Uprising and Serbian Revolution in 1804 and the first Constitution in 1835.
16 February^{1}	Statehood Day	Дан државности	Dan državnosti	Anniversary of the First Serbian Uprising and Serbian Revolution in 1804 and the first Constitution in 1835.
moveable Easter – 2 days	Good Friday	Велики петак	Veliki petak	Serbian Orthodox Church calculates Easter using Orthodox Computus
moveable Easter + 1 day	Easter Monday	Васкрсни понедељак (Ускрсни понедељак)	Vaskrsni ponedeljak (Uskrsni ponedeljak)	Serbian Orthodox Church calculates Easter using Orthodox Computus
1 May^{1}	Labour Day	Празник рада	Praznik rada	
2 May^{1}	Labour Day	Празник рада	Praznik rada	
11 November^{1}	Armistice Day	Дан примирја	Dan primirja	

^{1} If one of the non-religious holidays falls on a Sunday, then the next working day is a non-working day.

== Religious holidays ==
Additionally, the employees of Christian, Muslim and Jewish religion are allowed not to work on some of their religious holidays.

Religious holidays
Serbian Orthodox Christians
Date	Name	Serbian name (Cyrillic)	Serbian name (Latin)	Remarks
varies	Krsna slava	Крсна слава	Krsna slava	Family patron saint
Western Christians & Revised Julian calendar Eastern Orthodox Christians
Date	Name	Serbian name (Cyrillic)	Serbian name (Latin)	Remarks
25 December	Christmas Day	Божић	Božić	
Western Christians
Date	Name	Serbian name (Cyrillic)	Serbian name (Latin)	Remarks
varies	Good Friday	Велики петак	Veliki petak	
varies	Easter Monday	Ускрсни понедељак	Uskrsni ponedeljak	
Muslims
Date	Name	Serbian name (Cyrillic)	Serbian name (Latin)	Remarks
1 Shawwal	Eid al-Fitr	Рамазански Бајрам	Ramazanski Bajram	
10 Dhu al-Hijjah	Eid al-Adha	Курбански Бајрам	Kurbanski Bajram	
Jews
Date	Name	Serbian name (Cyrillic)	Serbian name (Latin)	Remarks
10 Tishrei	Yom Kippur	Јом Кипур	Jom Kipur	

== Working holidays ==
Some holidays are defined by the law as working holidays, hence they are not bank holidays, but they are observed by the state and people.

Working holidays
Date	Name	Serbian name (Cyrillic)	Serbian name (Latin)	Remarks
27 January	Saint Sava Day	Савиндан	Savindan	Serbian schools holiday; Saint Sava is patron saint of the Serbian schools. According to Julian calendar (in the Gregorian calendar it's observed on 14 January).
22 April	Holocaust, Genocide and other Fascist Crimes Victims of the World War II Remembrance Day	Дан сећања на жртве холокауста, геноцида и других жртава фашизма у Другом светском рату	Dan sećanja na žrtve holokausta, genocida i drugih žrtava fašizma u Drugom svetskom ratu	Remembrance on the prisoner breakout from Jasenovac concentration camp.
9 May	Victory Day	Дан победе	Dan pobede	Remembrance on the end of World War II in Europe.
28 June	Vidovdan (Saint Vitus Day)	Видовдан	Vidovdan	Remembrance on the Battle of Kosovo. According to Julian calendar (in the Gregorian calendar it's observed on 15 June).
15 September	Day of Serb Unity, Freedom, and the National Flag	Дан српског јединства, слободе и националне заставе	Dan srpskog jedinstva, slobode i nacionalne zastave	Remembrance on the breakthrough of the Macedonian Front in World War I.
21 October	World War II Serbian Victims Remembrance Day	Дан сећања на српске жртве у Другом светском рату	Dan sećanja na srpske žrtve u Drugom svetskom ratu	Remembrance on the Kragujevac massacre.

== See also ==
- Public holidays in Yugoslavia
