= State Flag Day =

State Flag Day may refer to:

- State Flag Day (Azerbaijan)
- State Flag Day (Tajikistan)
- State Flag and Constitution Day (Turkmenistan)

== See also ==
- Day of the National Flag (Ukraine)
- Flag Day (disambiguation)
- Flag flying day
