= Flag Day =

Flag-related holiday

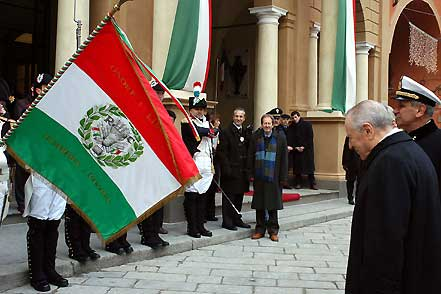
President Carlo Azeglio Ciampi honors the flag of Cispadane Republic, first Italian flag, during the Tricolour Day on 7 January 2004 in Reggio Emilia.

A flag day is a flag-related holiday, a day designated for flying a certain flag (such as a national flag) or a day set aside to celebrate a historical event such as a nation's adoption of its flag.

Flag days are usually codified in national statutes passed by legislative bodies or parliaments; however, in some countries a decree or proclamation by the head of state or chief executive can also order a flag day. The statute, or the proclamation or decree, may specify locations where flags are to be flown and how (for example, at full- or half-staff); alternatively, custom may prevail. The flag day is naturally a flag-flying day.

== Specific flag days ==
Nations that are not broadly recognized sovereign states are shown in pink. Defunct states are highlighted in light grey.

State	Subdivision	Date	Notes
Abkhazia		July 23	Republic Flag Day
Afghanistan, Islamic Republic of		Asad 7	National Flag’s Day. Asad corresponds to July – August.
Albania		November 28	Independence Day
Argentina		June 20	National Flag Day. Anniversary of the death of Manuel Belgrano, who created the current flag
Armenia		June 15	Commemorates the day the law on the flag was passed, on June 15, 2006
Australia		September 3	Commemorates the day the flag was first flown, on September 3, 1901
Azerbaijan		November 9	State Flag Day
Bangladesh		March 2	National Flag Day. Commemorates the first hoisting of the national flag in 1971.
Belarus		Second Sunday of May	Day of the National Emblem and the National Flag (May 10, 2026. For the next year, the date will be on April 9, 2027)
Bolivia		August 17	Commemorates the creation of the Bolivian flag by law on August 17, 1825
Bosnia and Herzegovina	Republika Srpska	September 15	Day of Serb Unity, Freedom and the National Flag, celebrated with Serbia
Brazil		November 19	
Canada		February 15	National Flag of Canada Day
Canada	Ontario	May 21	
Canada	Quebec	January 21	
Canada	Saskatchewan	September 22	
Canada	Franco-Ontarian	September 25	Commemorates the first flag-raising at the University of Sudbury on September 25, 1975
Chile		July 9	Commemorates the Battle of La Concepción in 1882
Chile	Magallanes	September 21	Commemorates the beginning of the Chilean takeover of the Strait of Magellan and Western Patagonia
Colombia		August 7	Commemorates the Battle of Boyacá on August 7, 1819 and the creation of the Colombian flag on August 7, 1834
Croatia		June 5	Commemorates the inauguration of Josip Jelačić as Ban of Croatia on June 5, 1848
Denmark		September 5	Commemorates Danish veterans
Denmark	Faroe Islands	April 25	Commemorates the recognition of the flag by the British government on April 25, 1940
Denmark	Greenland	January 26, 2025	Unofficial flag day celebrated in 2025. No official flag day.
Ecuador		September 26	Commemorates the adoption of the Ecuadorian flag on September 26, 1860
Estonia		June 4	
Ethiopia		First Monday of Tikimt	Ethiopian month of Tikmit corresponds to October 11 – November 9
Finland		Midsummer's Day	
Finland	Åland	Last Sunday of April	April 26, 2026. For the next year, the date will be on April 25, 2027
Georgia		January 14	Georgian State Flag Day
Greece		October 27	Day before Ohi Day
Haiti		May 18	Haitian Flag Day
Honduras		September 1	June 14 before 1995
Hungary		March 16	Commemorates the establishment of the Hungarian Home Guard on 16 March 1848
India		July 22	National Flag Adoption Day
India		December 7	Armed Forces Flag Day
India	Jammu and Kashmir (state)	June 7	State Flag Day
Italy		January 7	Tricolour Day
Iraq	Kurdistan	December 17	
Jordan		April 16	Commemorates the first flag-raising on April 16, 1928
Kyrgyzstan		March 3	National Flag Day of the Kyrgyz Republic
Lebanon		November 21	Commemorates the first flag-raising on November 21, 1943
Liberia		August 24	
Lithuania		January 1	
Mexico		February 24	Flag Day in Mexico
Mexico	Guanajuato	December 20	Commemorates day of state admission. Celebrated since 2023
Moldova		April 27	
Mongolia		July 10	Mongolian State Flag Day
Nepal		Poush 1	Commemorates adoption on December 16, 1962 (Poush 1, 2019 in the Nepali calendar). Celebrated since 2017
The Netherlands	Aruba	March 18	National Anthem and Flag Day
The Netherlands	Bonaire	September 6	
The Netherlands	Curaçao	July 2	
The Netherlands	Sint Maarten	June 13	Commemorates the adoption of the flag on June 13, 1985
New Zealand	Tokelau	October 22	
North Macedonia		May 15	Unofficial
Palestine		September 30	Commemorates the first time the flag was flown outside the Headquarters of the United Nations on September 30, 2015
Panama		November 4	
Paraguay		August 14	
Peru		June 7	Commemorates the Battle of Arica
Philippines		May 28	Commemorates its first usage after the Battle of Alapan. Since 1994, the celebratory period is May 28 to June 12
Poland		May 2	Polish National Flag Day
Portugal		December 1	Flag Day. In the same day of the celebration of the Restoration of Independence of Portugal on the December, 1, 1640
Romania		June 26	
Russia		August 22	
Russia	Donetsk People's Republic	October 25	
Russia	Bashkortostan	February 25	Commemorates adoption of the flag on February 25, 1992
Russia	Pskov Oblast	February 20	Commemorates inclusion into the State Heraldic Register of the Russian Federation on February 20, 2019. Established 2023.
Russia	Sakha Republic	October 14	Commemorates adoption of the flag on October 14, 1992
Russia	Ulyanovsk Oblast	December 22	
Saudi Arabia		March 11	Saudi Flag Day
Serbia		September 15	Day of Serb Unity, Freedom and the National Flag, celebrated with Republika Srpska
Slovenia		April 7	
Somalia		October 12	Commemorates the adoption of the flag on October 12, 1954
Spain	Andalusia	December 4	
Sweden		June 6	Also celebrated as the National Day of Sweden since 1983
Tajikistan		November 24	Celebrated since 2009
Thailand		September 28	Celebrated since 2017
Turkmenistan		May 18	State Flag and Constitution Day. Flag Day was originally separate from Constitution Day and celebrated on February 19, until the two holidays were combined in 2017
Ukraine		August 23	Day of the National Flag
Ukraine	Crimean Tatars	June 26	
United Arab Emirates		November 3	Flag Day (United Arab Emirates)
United States		June 14	Flag Day (United States)
United States	Alaska	July 9	
United States	American Samoa	April 17	Commemorates the date American Samoa first flew the US flag
United States	Choctaw Nation	October 16	Celebrated since 2021
United States	Hawaii	July 31	Celebrated since 1990
United States	Iowa	March 29	
United States	Maryland	March 9	
United States	Oklahoma	November 16	Celebrated since 1968
United States	Tennessee	April 17	Commemorates the day of adoption on April 17, 1905
United States	Utah	March 9	
United States	U.S. Virgin Islands	May 17	Commemorates the adoption of the flag on May 17, 1921
Uzbekistan		November 18	Commemorates the approval of the flag on November 18, 1991
Venezuela		August 3	Commemorates the first hoisting of the flag on August 3, 1806

== See also ==
- Flag flying day
- National Day
- Republic Day
- Independence Day
- Public holiday
