= Bosnia and Herzegovina–Kosovo relations =

Diplomatic relations between Bosnia and Herzegovina and Kosovo

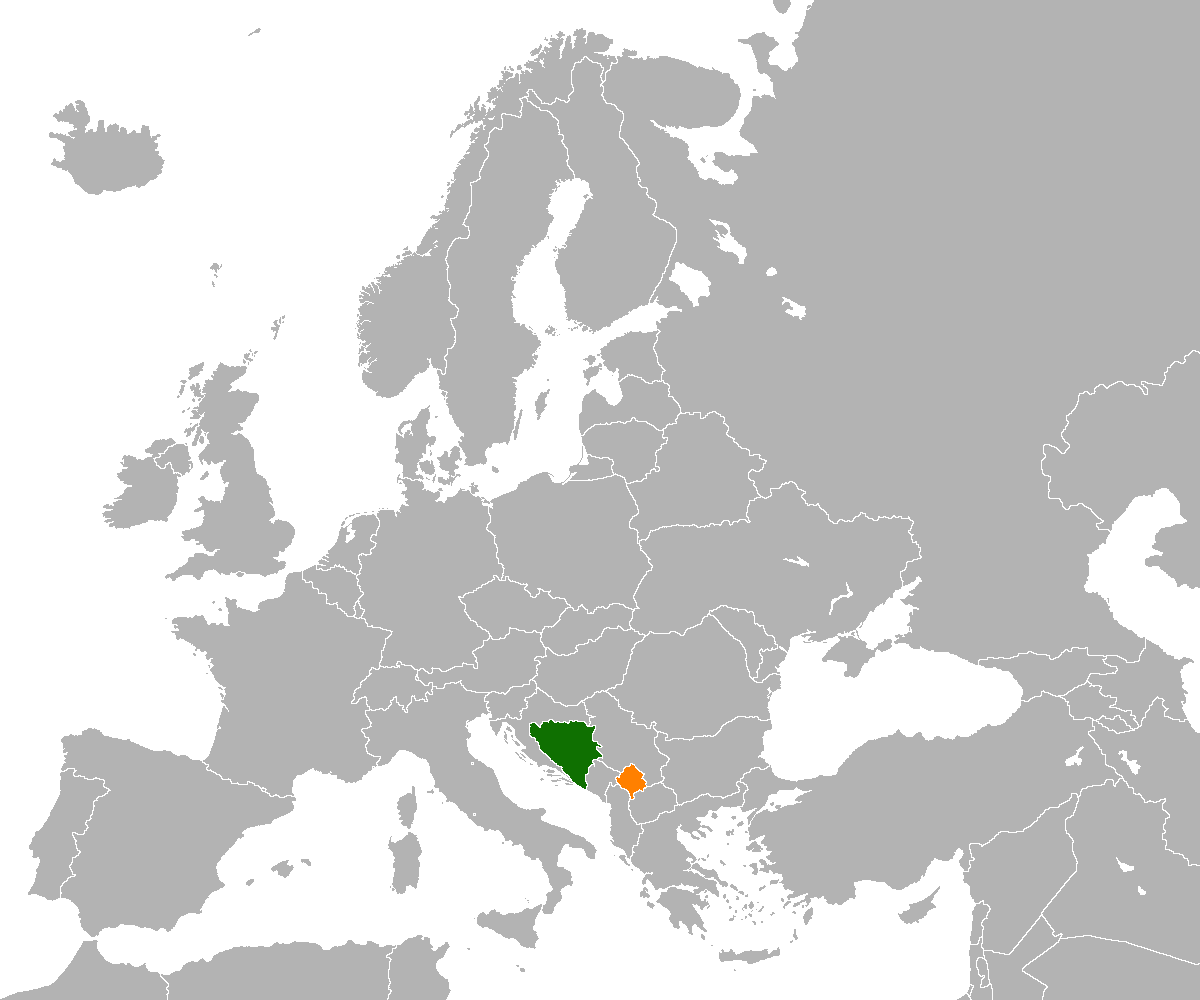

- Bosnia and Herzegovina: Kosovo

The relations between Bosnia and Herzegovina and the Republic of Kosovo are unofficial because the former's central government has not recognized Kosovo as a sovereign state, essentially through the veto of the Bosnian Serb-dominated Republika Srpska. Bosniak and Croat members of the Presidency support the recognition of Kosovo as a sovereign state, and Serb members do not; Bosnia and Herzegovina's constitution requires consensus among all three members in order to perform such an action. Bosnia and Herzegovina and Serbia remain the only two countries of the former Yugoslavia not to recognize Kosovo's independence.

== History ==
Kosovo's declaration of independence from Serbia was enacted on Sunday, 17 February 2008 by a unanimous vote of the Assembly of Kosovo. All 11 representatives of the Serb minority boycotted the proceedings. International reaction was mixed, and the world community continues to be divided on the issue of the international recognition of Kosovo.

On 21 February 2008, Republika Srpska, one of the two entities of Bosnia and Herzegovina, adopted a resolution through which it denounced and refused to recognise the unilateral declaration of independence of Kosovo from Serbia. In addition, the R.S. parliament adopted a resolution stating that in the event that a majority of EU and UN states recognise Kosovo's independence, Republika Srpska would cite the Kosovo secession as a precedent and move to hold a referendum on its own constitutional status within Bosnia and Herzegovina. Finally, the resolution called upon all Republika Srpska officials to do everything in order to prevent Bosnia and Herzegovina from recognising Kosovo's declared independence.

The Foreign Minister Sven Alkalaj informed the public on 2 August 2008 that by law Bosnia and Herzegovina cannot accept Kosovan passports, until the Bosnian presidency makes such a determination.

On 27 August 2008, former Bosnian ambassador in Turkey Hajrudin Somun wrote an editorial discussing Kosovan passports, where he summarised to-date the Bosnian position on Kosovo: "As in many other matters, Bosnia and Herzegovina is deeply divided over Kosovo's independence. The parliament of the Republika Srpska, which covers 49 percent of the country's territory, adopted a special resolution denouncing Kosovo's independence and wide demonstrations have been organized there in protest. Keeping in mind that Serb leaders of that entity have threatened to secede from Bosnia and Herzegovina and join Serbia as compensation for losing Kosovo, Bosnian collective presidency Chairman Haris Silajdžić said simply that his country is 'unlikely to recognize Kosovo's independence any time soon due to strong objections from its own Serb community'".

On 26 September 2008 while attending General Assembly of the United Nations in New York, Bosnian Presidency Chairman Haris Silajdžić said in a Voice of America interview broadcast back to Bosnia in Bosnian language that he supports Kosovo's independence and is opposed to Serbia's request that the International Court of Justice issue an opinion on the legitimacy of Kosovo's independence. Silajdžić spoke in his own name because the Presidency of Bosnia and Herzegovina did not unanimously adopt a platform which would allow him to speak officially.

In August 2009 the Forum of Bosniaks of Kosovo requested that Bosnia recognise Kosovo and the travel documents of its citizens. In response, Presidency ethnic Serb member Nebojša Radmanović stated that the Presidency would not discuss the issue in the foreseeable future, and that those making such demands must consider "what kind of state Bosnia-Herzegovina is, what tendencies are present, and what could be the consequences of such a move". He said, "Sometimes, thinking with the heart is not good for the bigger political goals".

In July 2010, Željko Komšić, the Croat member of Bosnia-Herzegovina's Presidency, announced that he recognised Serbia without Kosovo. He repeated the same stance in December 2019.

In April 2012 the President of the Republika Srpska Milorad Dodik said that the Bosnian Minister of Foreign Affairs Zlatko Lagumdžija in the first session of the Council of Ministers of Bosnia and Herzegovina tried to insert a statute that was supposed to regulate or lead to some essential informal recognition of Kosovo, but he blocked the process.

In April 2023, Bosnia and Herzegovina along with Greece, Moldova, Slovakia and Ukraine abstained in the vote to approve Kosovo's membership in the Council of Europe. Bosnia's abstention was strongly criticised by the Serbian government.

In October 2024, Albin Kurti, the prime minister of Kosovo, announced the lifting of visa requirements for Bosnian citizens after January 1, 2025. Kurti stated that Bosnia and Kosovo, as 'friendly countries', should focus on building economic and cultural ties for the well-being of their citizens. However, Milorad Dodik has continuously stressed that Bosnia will not accept the entrance of Kosovo residents without a visa.

== See also ==
- Foreign relations of Bosnia and Herzegovina
- Foreign relations of Kosovo
- Accession of Bosnia and Herzegovina to the EU
- Accession of Kosovo to the EU
- Bosnia and Herzegovina-NATO relations
- Kosovo-NATO relations
- Bosnia and Herzegovina–Serbia relations
