= Day of Serb Unity, Freedom, and the National Flag =

Public holiday in Serbia

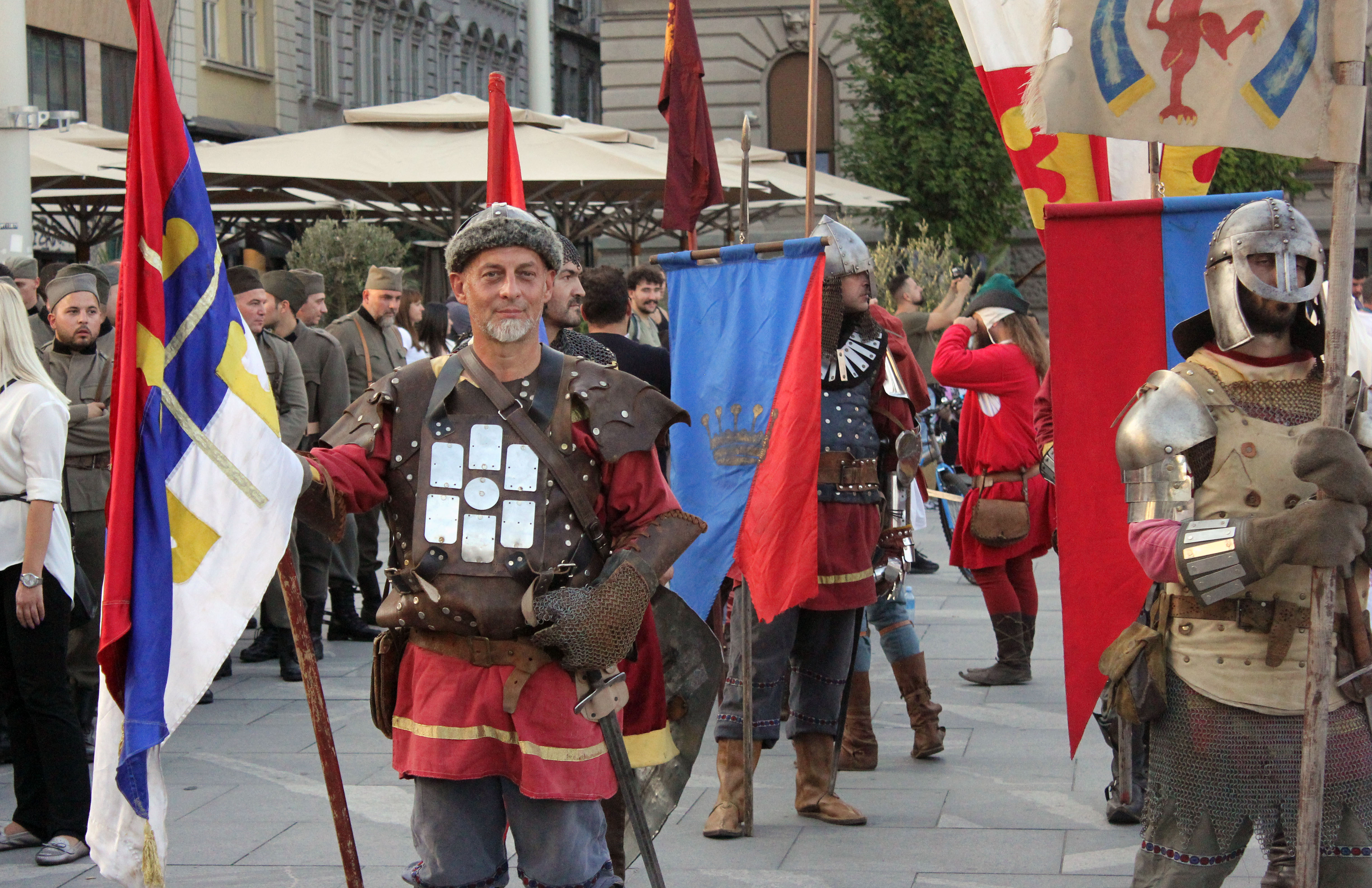
Event in Belgrade marking the Day of Serb Unity, Freedom, and the National Flag, 2024

State flag of Serbia

Civil flag of Serbia

Flag of Republika Srpska

Day of Serb Unity, Freedom and the National Flag (Serbian: Дан српског јединства, слободе и националне заставе, romanized: Dan srpskog jedinstva, slobode i nacionalne zastave) is a public holiday that is celebrated on 15 September in Serbia and Republika Srpska. The holiday is symbolically established to be celebrated on the day when the breakthrough of the Salonica front is celebrated. It has been celebrated since 2020.

== History ==
The idea of a holiday in both countries (Serbia and Srpska) was unveiled by President Vučić, Prime Minister Brnabić, and the leaders of Republika Srpska in August 2020. It was decided that it would be put into further consideration about establishing it as a new statewide holiday.

On 10 September 2020, the government of Srpska reached a decision on making the Day of Serb Unity, Freedom and the National Flag official, which made it a new holiday in Srpska.

A day later, on 11 September 2020, the Government of Serbia also made the day official, making it official in both Serbia and Srpska.

As of 2024, there has been no voting in the National Assembly to change the Law of State and Other holidays of the Republic of Serbia. The Law remains unchanged since 2011, so the holiday is legally not an official one, although its celebration is encouraged by government as a working holiday.

== Festivities ==
The purpose of establishing this holiday is to promote the unity of the Serbians of Serbia and Srpska. It also promotes the respect of the Serbian flags.

In other countries that have their own flag days, proper use and display of the flag can be found in state buildings and provincial buildings as a show of respect for the flag. The display of the flag in those countries follows state regulations. In Serbia, either the national or the civil flag may be flown.

== See also ==
- Serbia
- Republika Srpska
- Republika Srpska–Serbia relations
- Flag of Serbia
- Flag of Republika Srpska
- Public holidays in Serbia
