= Flag day (Hong Kong) =

Hong Kong fundraising event

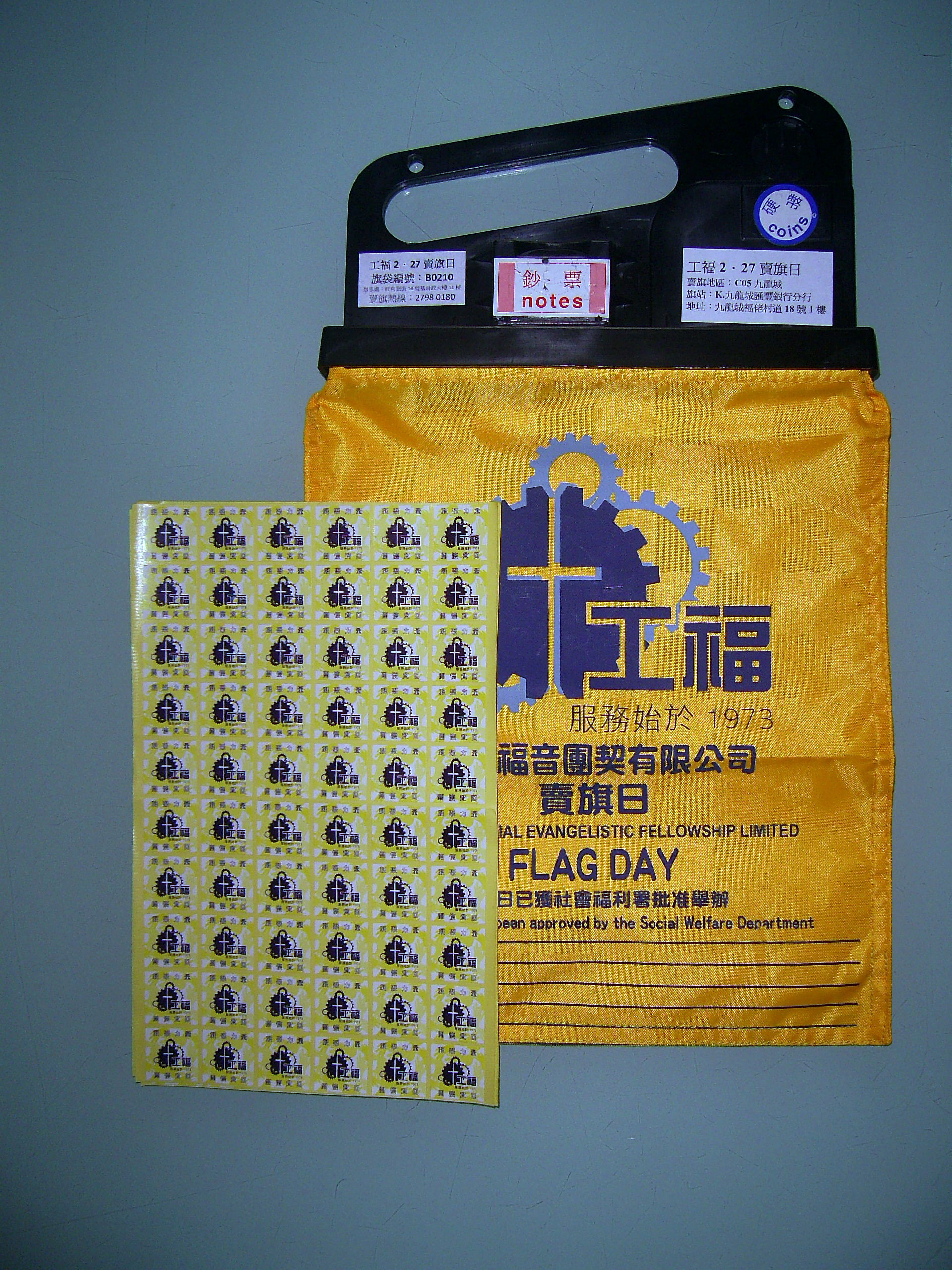
Modern flags and donation bag

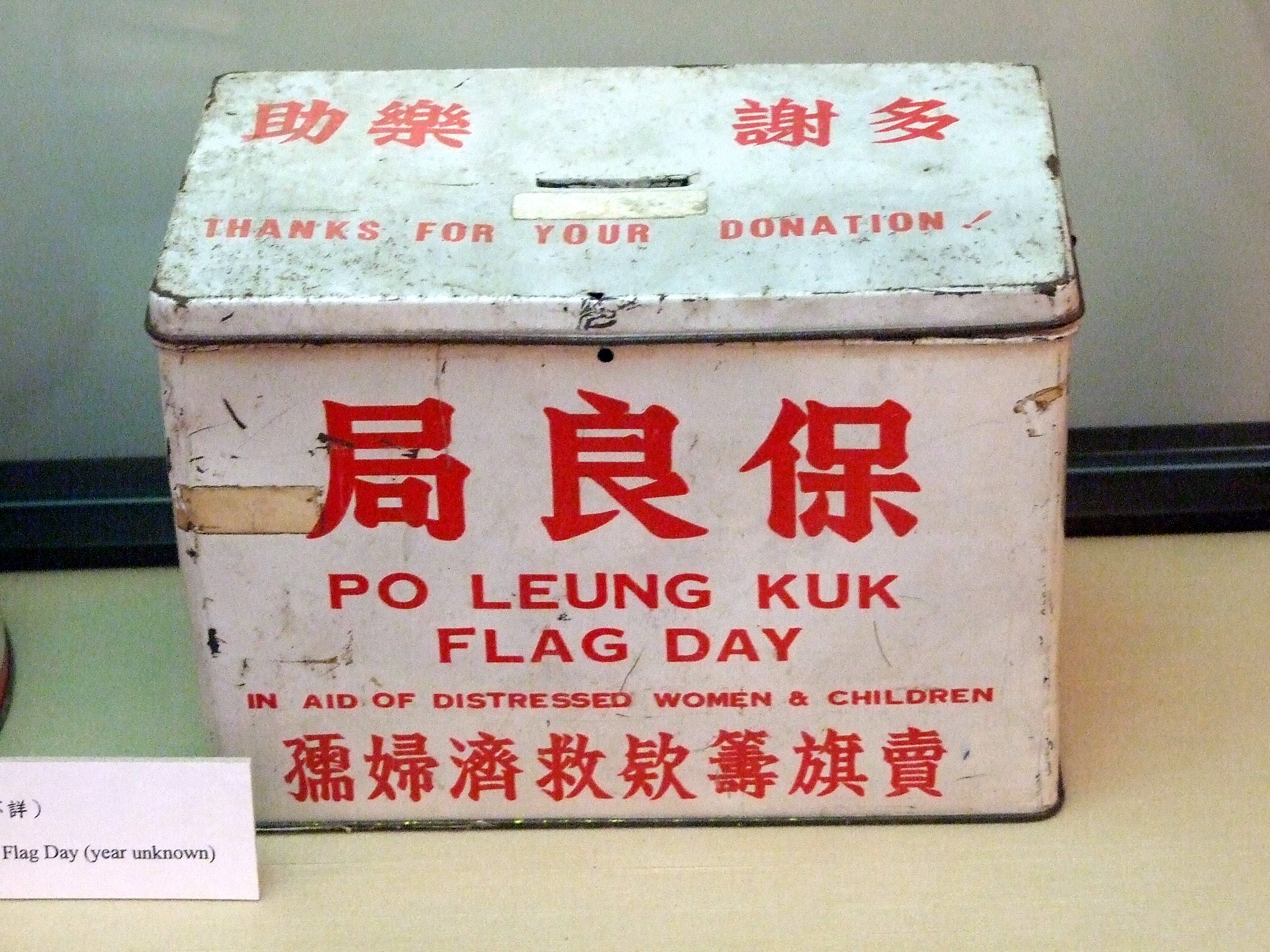
Flag day donation collection box

A flag day (Chinese: 賣旗日) in Hong Kong is a day on which public fundraising of charities takes place. Organised public fundraising in Hong Kong must be government-approved. Historically, it had been held only on a Saturday. It is currently, however, organised on Wednesdays and Saturdays. Flag-selling (賣旗) hours are from 7:00 in the morning to 12:30 in the afternoon on a flag day.

On a flag day, volunteers with some stock of "flags" and a bag to collect donations (money) stand on streets to raise funds from passers-by. In the past, actual small flags were handed out to people who gave money. Nowadays, people receive a little sticker, which typically bears the name and logo of the beneficiary, to place on their clothing after they donate money. Those stickers for particular use in a flag day are still called "flags", in both English and Cantonese.

== Application procedure ==
Any charitable organisation must obtain a Public Subscription Permit from the Social Welfare Department prior to performing any public fundraising activities.

== Governing ordinance ==
Government approval of flag day activities is enshrined in the Summary Offences Ordinance, Cap. 228 Section 4(17)(i) in the Laws of Hong Kong. It states that any person or organisation that organises, provides equipment for, or participates in any collection of money or sale or exchange for donation of badges, tokens or similar articles in a public place for charitable purpose, should apply for a permit from the Director of Social Welfare.

== Applicants ==
Most approved flags-selling organisations are non-profit organisations.

== See also ==
- Flag Day
