= Delta Air Lines Flight 9877 =

1967 aviation accident

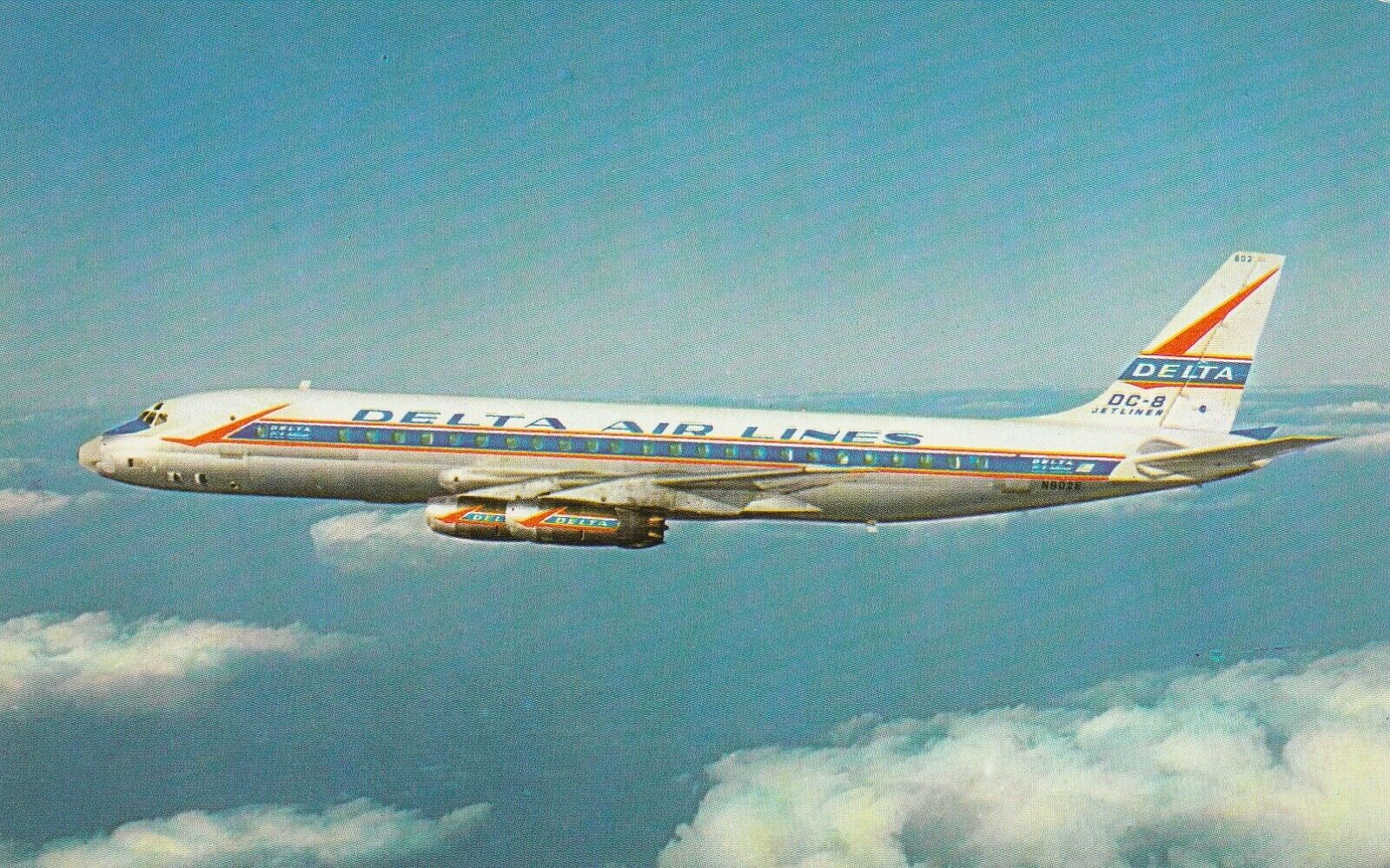
- N802E, the aircraft involved in the accident in a previous livery

Accident
- Date: March 30, 1967
- Summary: Stalled during a two-engine out approach
- Site: New Orleans International Airport, Kenner, Louisiana, United States; 29°59′N 90°16′W
- Total fatalities: 19

Aircraft
- Aircraft type: Douglas DC-8-51
- Operator: Delta Air Lines
- IATA flight No.: DL9877
- ICAO flight No.: DAL9877
- Call sign: DELTA 9877
- Registration: N802E
- Flight origin: New Orleans International Airport, Kenner, Louisiana, United States
- Destination: New Orleans International Airport, Kenner, Louisiana, United States
- Occupants: 6
- Crew: 6
- Fatalities: 6
- Survivors: 0

Ground casualties
- Ground fatalities: 13

Delta Air Lines Flight 9877 was a scheduled training flight of a Douglas DC-8-51 that crashed on approach to New Orleans International Airport in Kenner, Louisiana, on March 30, 1967. The aircraft, registered N802E, struck a residential area while conducting a simulated two-engine-out landing, killing all six people on board—including five crewmembers and a FAA observer. Thirteen people were killed on the ground. Several homes, part of a motel complex, and the aircraft were destroyed. The National Transportation Safety Board (NTSB) determined the accident was caused by improper supervision by the instructor and improper use of flight and power controls by both the instructor and the captain-trainee, resulting in loss of control.

== Background ==
=== Aircraft ===
The accident aircraft was a Douglas DC-8-51, registration N802E, serial number 45409. It was manufactured by the Douglas Aircraft Company and delivered to Delta Air Lines on September 14, 1959. At the time of the accident, the airframe had accumulated 23,391 flight hours. Maintenance records indicated that the aircraft had been maintained in accordance with FAA regulations.

N802E was powered by four Pratt & Whitney JT3D-1 turbofan engines, installed as follows:

Position	Serial number	Time since overhaul (hours)	Total time (hours)
1	644003	4,537.7	11,089.1
2	644302	4,476.6	8,048.4
3	644000	3,517.2	10,081.1
4	644069	4,152.5	10,400.3

At takeoff, it weighed 179,670 lb (81,500 kg), well below the maximum certified takeoff weight of 275,500 lb (124,966 kg) and the maximum design landing weight of 199,500 lb (90,493 kg). The center of gravity was calculated at 25.0 percent mean aerodynamic chord, within the allowable range of 16.5 to 32 percent.

=== Crew ===
The crew consisted of six members. Captain Maurice G. Watson (age 44) had 19,008 flight hours, including 475 in the DC-8, and had been with the airline since June 3, 1949. Captain James W. Morton (age 48) had 16,929 hours, with 15 in the DC-8, and was hired on March 13, 1951. Captain William T. Jeter Jr. (age 33) had 2,715 hours as a flight engineer, including 529 in the DC-8, and had been employed since October 9, 1959. Flight Engineer David E. Posey (age 25) had 1,371 hours as a flight engineer, with 667 in the DC-8, and joined the airline on November 14, 1964. Flight Engineer George Plazza (age 30) had 802 total hours as a flight engineer and was hired on May 3, 1965. All three captains were rated on the DC-3, DC-6, DC-7, DC-9, and Convair CV-240/340/440, in addition to the DC-8. For the accident flight, Watson was in the left seat as instructor pilot for Morton in the right seat; Jeter served as check airman for Posey, who was instructing Plazza as part of his training. There were no cabin crew members or passengers on board the aircraft for this flight.

== Accident ==
On 30 March 1967, Flight 9877 departed New Orleans International Airport at 00:40 CST (local) for a scheduled training exercise. The session was intended to provide upgrade training for Captain James W. Morton and flight engineer qualification for George Piazza. Captain Maurice G. Watson served as instructor pilot, and Captain William T. Jeter Jr. acted as check airman for Flight Engineer David E. Posey, who was instructing Piazza. A FAA operations inspector was on board as an observer.

The crew requested and received clearance for takeoff from Runway 28, followed by a circle to land on Runway 1. Departure clearance was issued at 00:43 CST. Shortly after takeoff, a simulated failure of the No. 1 engine was introduced at decision speed (V_{1}), followed one minute later by a simulated failure of the No. 2 engine during climbout at about 1,200 ft (370 m) and 200 kn (370 km/h). At 00:46 CST a simulated loss of rudder power was initiated. The aircraft entered a left turn to an easterly heading, descending to approximately 900 ft (270 m) before climbing back to 1,100 ft (340 m) as flaps were extended to 25° and airspeed decreased to 180 kn (330 km/h).

At approximately 00:49 CST, 2.5 nmi (4.6 km) from the runway, full landing flaps were deployed without a command from the pilot flying, causing a significant increase in drag. Airspeed decreased to about 136 kn (252 km/h) as the nose was raised to maintain the glidepath. Power was applied to the remaining engines, resulting in asymmetric thrust, rapid yaw, and roll to the left.

At 00:50 CST, the DC-8 struck trees approximately 2,300 ft (700 m) short and 1,100 ft (340 m) west of the Runway 1 threshold, then collided with several structures before coming to rest against a motel complex, where it was destroyed by impact forces and post-crash fire.

== Investigation ==
The instructor lowered full landing flaps, on his own initiative, too early in the approach. The drag caused by the flaps caused the airspeed to decay, and rate of descent to increase, to which the captain-trainee responded with pitching the nose up, instead of using thrust. The instructor failed to intervene, which was probably a result of his confidence in the captain-trainee. The crew was also probably affected by fatigue.

=== Probable cause ===
The investigators concluded that the probable cause of the accident is:

Improper supervision by the instructor, and the improper use of flight and power controls by both instructor and the Captain-trainee during a simulated two-engine out landing approach, which resulted in a loss of control.

== See also ==
- Airbus Industrie Flight 129
- Airborne Express Flight 827
- Delta Air Lines Flight 9570
- KLM Cityhopper Flight 433
- Latin Carga Convair CV-880 crash - a former Delta Air Lines aircraft that crashed in another training flight
