= Agreement on Special Parallel Relations =

1997 agreement between Republic of Serbia and Republika Srpska

Agreement on Special Parallel Relations
- Signed: February 28, 1997
- Parties: Republic of Serbia; Republika Srpska

The Agreement on Special Parallel Relations is a cooperation agreement between Republic of Serbia and Republika Srpska (an entity in Bosnia and Herzegovina), signed for the first time on February 28, 1997, to develop better relations between the two. It was updated on 2006. A Council for Cooperation between Serbia and the Republic of Srpska has been founded, which comprises presidents and prime ministers of Serbia and the Bosnian entity. The Agreement was implemented December 15, 2010. So far, four councils have been held.

== Document ==
- Article 1: The Federal Republic and Republika Srpska (hereinafter the Parties) confirm their determination to promote their relations on the basis of friendship, confidence, cooperation and respect of mutual interest, in accordance with the principles of independence, non-interference in internal affairs, equality and respect for human rights and fundamental freedoms.
- Article 2: The Parties confirm their opposition to the use or threat of force in international relations and their firm support for the resolution of international conflicts and disputes by peaceful means. In their overall relations and cooperation, the Parties shall be guided by the goals of peace, stability and progress for all peoples and states on the basis of equality, democracy and market economy.
- Article 3: The Parties shall contribute, by the development of their relations, to the fostering of international cooperation and understanding and will invest joint efforts with a view to strengthening the role of the United Nations in the preservation and promotion of international peace and security.
- Article 4: The Parties confirm their full commitment to, and respect for, international standards and obligations in the field of human rights and fundamental freedoms, and are ready to cooperate in resolving international humanitarian problems.
- Article 5: A Council for Cooperation shall be set up (hereinafter 'Council'). The President of the council is the President of the Federal Republic of Yugoslavia, the Vice-President is the president from Republika Srpska on the Presidency of Bosnia-Herzegovina. The Council shall consist of 7 (seven) members – 3 (three) appointed by the President and 2 (two) by the Vice-President of the council.
- Article 6: The Council shall encourage, plan and harmonize comprehensive cooperation, particularly in the fields of:

establishment of special parallel relations;
culture, education, science, technology, information, sport and other fields of human creativity;
economic development and progressive linking of production, trade, energetics, infrastructure and finance, with a view to creating a single market;
economic renewal, reconstruction and development; transport, traffic and communications; production, exploitation and transmission of energy;
tourism and protection of the environment; social policies, health-care protection;
prevention of natural disasters and elimination of the consequences thereof;
cooperation of non-governmental organizations; migration, immigration and asylum;
combating terrorism, illegal drug trafficking, arms smuggling, money laundering, threats to civilian air traffic and all other forms of organized crime;
regional security; state border-crossing regime; citizenship;
harmonization of foreign policies and approach to third countries and international organizations;
harmonization of legal and other regulations, extension of legal assistance;
resolution of succession issues of the former SFRY;
other fields of mutual interest for the Parties.

With a view to realizing an efficient cooperation in the above fields, as well as the goals and provisions of this Agreement, the Parties may conclude specific Agreements.

- Article 7: The Council shall meet as may be necessary, at least once in three months. The Governments of the Parties shall review the initiatives, recommendations and conclusions of the Council within fifteen (15) days. In cases which pose a threat or danger to international peace and security, the Council shall be obliged to meet. The Council may set up working bodies to carry out certain tasks or for certain fields of cooperation, if it deems it necessary.
- Article 8: The Parties shall, as soon as possible, take up activities to establish special parallel relations for the prosperity of their people and citizens and the creation of stable conditions for development, taking into account the sovereignty and territorial integrity of Bosnia-Herzegovina and the Federal Republic of Yugoslavia respectively.
- Article 9: The Parties shall not allow the use of their territories for aggression against the other Party. The Parties hereby undertake not to extend any military or any other assistance to an aggressors or aggressors, in case one of the Parties is exposed to armed attack by a third Party or Parties. In case of such an attack, the Parties shall, with a view to containing the aggression and eliminating its consequences, invest all efforts in accordance with the Charter of the United Nations and use all possibilities envisaged by the UN and other international organizations and arrangements. The terms and modalities of cooperation in the field of regional security the Parties will regulate more precisely through a separate agreement.
- Article 10: The Parties shall particularly encourage joint investments in economy, transfer of technologies, infrastructural links, joint access to third markets and towards that end shall create appropriate conditions by regulations, economic policies, standardization and mutual contractual relations.
- Article 11: With a view to promoting economic cooperation, the Parties shall set up a Joint Inter-Governmental Commission.
- Article 12: The Parties are committed to the principle of free movement of people, goods, capital, and of cultural information and other values. The citizens of the Parties shall not be required to obtain visas and pay taxes to cross the border. The customs authorities shall cooperate in facilitating cross- border movement of goods, as well as in prevention of customs violations.
- Article 13: The Parties shall promote the development of contacts and cooperation between their Parliaments, as well as regional and local authorities and institutions. They shall encourage cooperation between their youth organizations, trade unions, educational and sports institutions, as well as expert, humanitarian and other social organizations.
- Article 14: This Agreement shall be subject to ratification by the Federal Assembly of the Federal Republic of Yugoslavia and the Parliamentary Assembly of Bosnia- Herzegovina, pursuant to their Constitutional provisions.

In witness whereof, the undersigned signed and affixed their seals to this Agreement, made in 3 (three) identical copies, at Belgrade, on 28 February 1997.

For the Federal Republic of Yugoslavia: Zoran Lilić, President of the Federal Republic of Yugoslavia.

For Republika Srpska: Momčilo Krajišnik, Serb member on the Presidency of Bosnia and Herzegovina.

== See also ==
- Republika Srpska–Serbia relations
