= 1980 Latin Carga Convair CV-880 crash =

Fatal aviation accident in Venezuela

Latin Carga Convair CV-880 crash
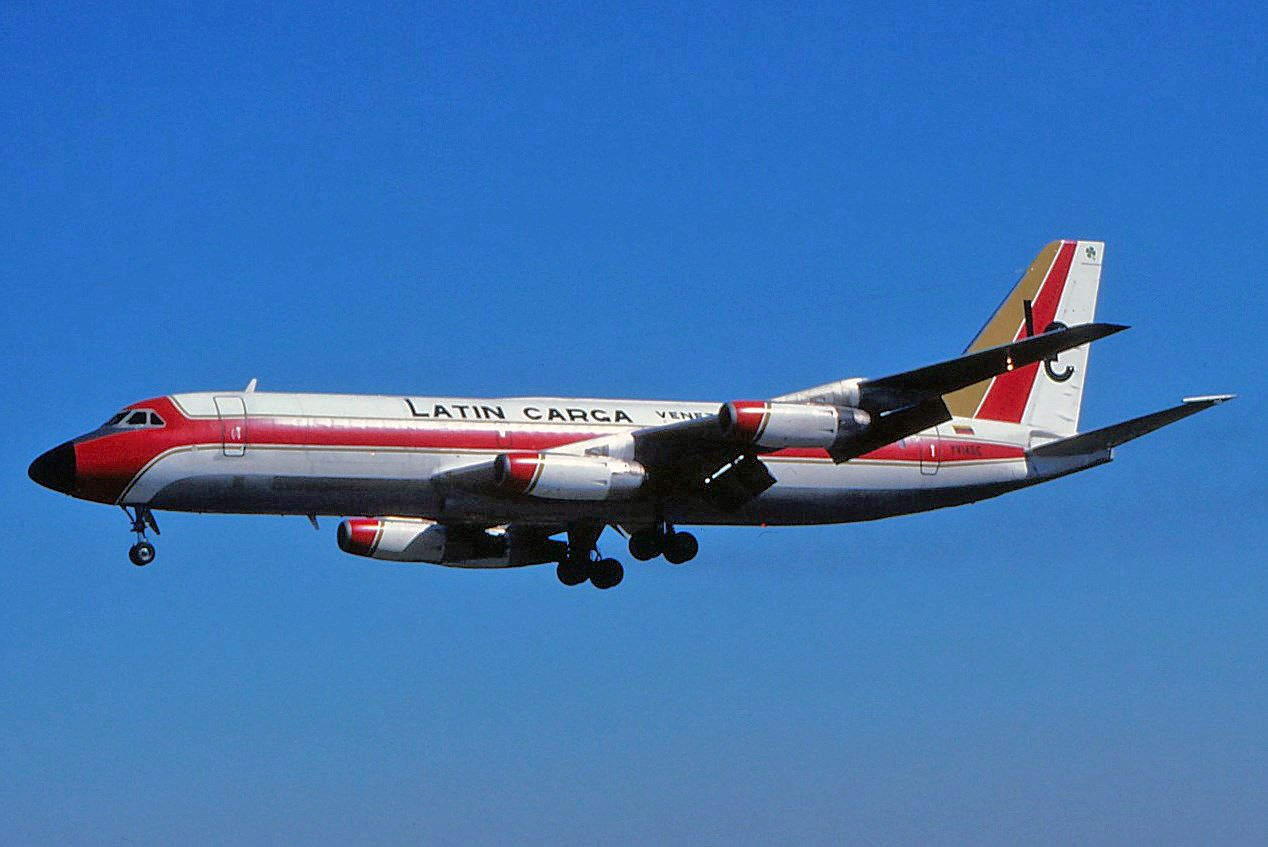
- YV-145C, the aircraft involved in the accident, in January 1980

Accident
- Date: 3 November 1980
- Summary: Crash during training flight
- Site: Simón Bolívar International Airport, Caracas, Venezuela; 10.603117°N 66.990583°W

Aircraft
- Aircraft type: Convair 880
- Operator: Latin Carga
- Registration: YV-145C
- Flight origin: Simón Bolívar International Airport, Caracas, Venezuela
- Destination: Tocumen International Airport, Panama City, Panama
- Occupants: 4
- Crew: 4
- Fatalities: 4
- Survivors: 0

On 3 November 1980, a Latin Carga Convair 880 crashed in Caracas, Venezuela.

The aircraft involved was a Convair CV-880F, (registered as YV-145C, with serial number 22-00-64) built in 1962.

Four crew members took off from Simón Bolivar International Airport on November 3, 1980, on a training flight to Panama. Soon after take-off, the plane plummeted and crashed at the end of the runway, bursting into flames and causing the deaths of all 4 occupants. The aircraft also transported all the equipment and gear of English musician and songwriter Peter Frampton, who was touring in Latin America at the time.

== See also ==
- Delta Air Lines Flight 9877 - a similar training crash involving a Delta Air Lines airplane.
