= Latin Carga =

Venezuelan cargo airline

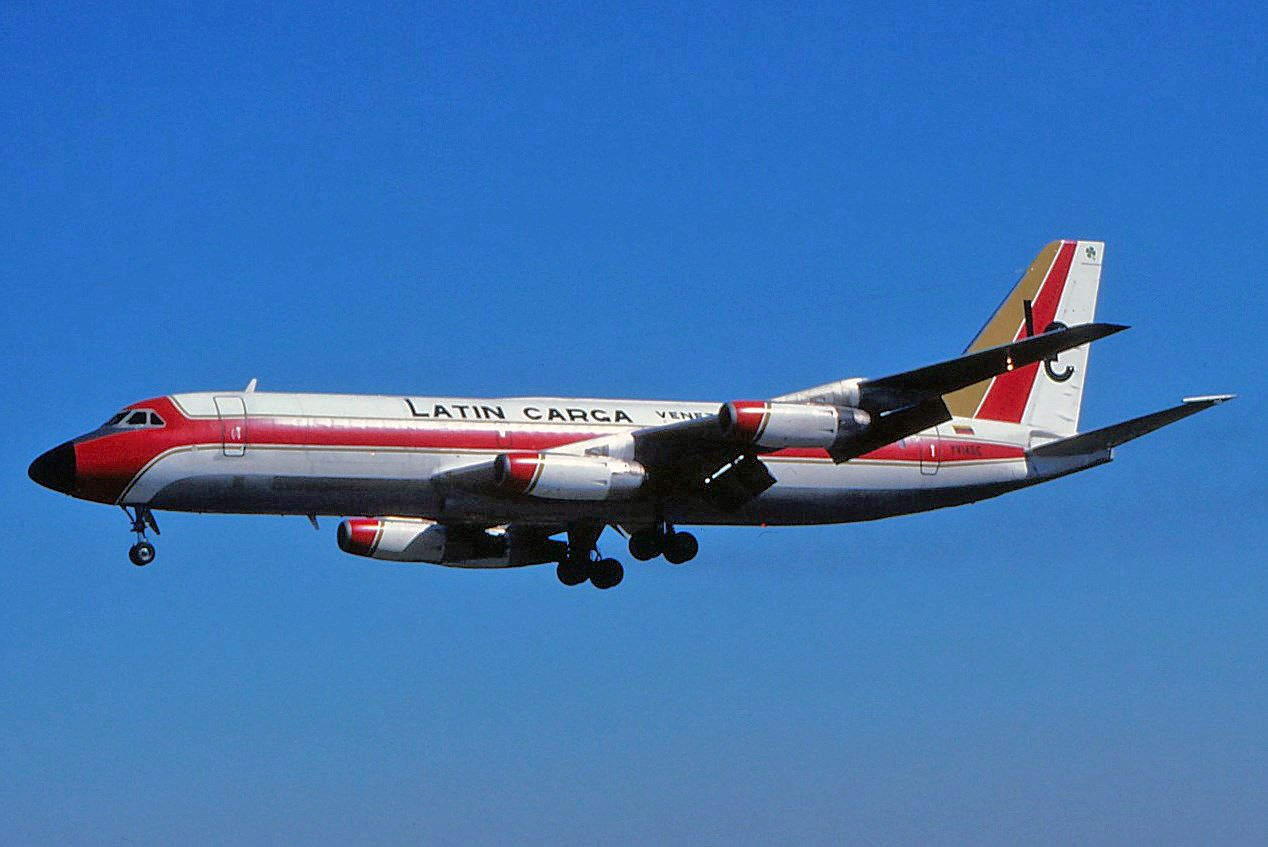
IATA	ICAO	Call sign
-	LTC	-
- Founded: 1963
- Ceased operations: 1980
- Hubs: Simón Bolívar International Airport
- Fleet size: 15
- Destinations: 9
- Headquarters: Caracas, Venezuela

Latin Carga (legally Latinoamericana Aerea de Carga) was a Venezuelan cargo airline that operated from 1963 to 1980. It operated different types of aircraft, from turboprops to jetliners.

== History ==
The airline began flying in 1963 as Tigres Voladores (Flying Tigers). In 1972, the airline changed its name to Latin Carga. On November 3, 1980, Latin Carga lost its only Convair CV 880 in a crash. That same year it ceased to exist.

== Destinations ==
Aruba

- Oranjestad (Queen Beatrix International Airport)

Colombia

- Barranquilla (Ernesto Cortissoz International Airport)

Jamaica

- Kingston (Norman Manley International Airport)

Panama

- Panama City (Tocumen International Airport)

United States

- Miami (Miami International Airport)

Venezuela

- Caracas (Simón Bolívar International Airport) Hub
- Maracaibo (La Chinita International Airport)
- Porlamar (Santiago Mariño Caribbean International Airport)
- Puerto Ayacucho (Cacique Aramare Airport)

== Fleet ==
The airline operated several different aircraft:

- 2 Convair 880 (one crashed and another never entered service)
- 11 Curtiss C-46 Commando
- 1 Douglas C-47A Skytrain
- 1 Douglas DC-6A
- 1 Douglas DC-6B
- 1 Douglas DC-7C

== Incidents and accidents ==
- On December 5, 1972, a Curtiss C-46 Commando (registered YV-C-TGE), flying from Kingston to Barranquilla, was damaged beyond repair when it force landed in trees, 10 kilometers from Ernesto Cortissoz International Airport. All 3 crew members were not injured.
- YV-140C was written off in 1975
- On November 3, 1980, a Convair 880 (registered YV-145C) crashed on take-off from Simon Bolivar International Airport, resulting in the deaths of 4 occupants, and destruction of the aircraft.

== See also ==
- List of defunct airlines of Venezuela
