= All-Serb Assembly =

All-Serb Assembly (Свесрпски сабор) is the name given to several assemblies gathering Serb activists:

- All-Serb Assembly (15 April 1990).
- All-Serb Assembly in Srb (25 July 1990), organized by the Serb Democratic Party, gathering of 150,000 Serbs with chosen delegates from Serb municipalities (12 municipalities), leading to the establishment of the Serb National Council.
- All-Serb Assembly in Donja Gradina (16 September 1990).
- All-Serb Assembly in Banja Luka.
- All-Serb Assembly in Pristina (25–26 January 1997), organized by the Serbian Renewal Movement and Eparchy of Raška and Prizren.
- All-Serb Assembly in Belgrade (June 2024)

== See also ==
- All-Serb Congress in Chicago (1947).

== Sources ==
- Samardžić, Radovan (1993). Ratni zločini i zločini genocida, 1991-1992: naučno savetovanje Odbora SANU za skupljanje građe o genocidu protiv srpskog naroda i drugih naroda Jugoslavije u XX veku i Državne komisije za ratne zločine i zločine genocida održano od 6. do 8. avgusta 1992. godine u Beogradu. Srpska akademija nauka i umetnosti.
