= Bosnia and Herzegovina–Serbia relations =

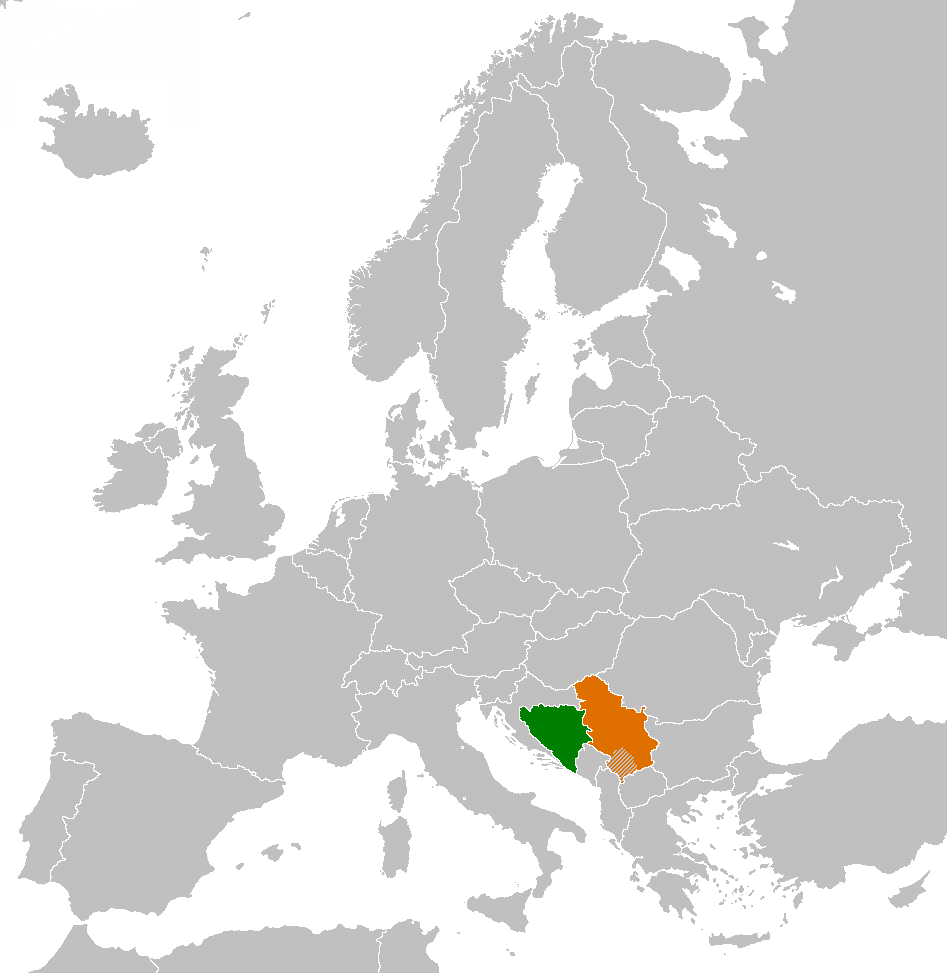

- Bosnia and Herzegovina: Serbia

Bosnia and Herzegovina and Serbia maintain diplomatic relations established between Bosnia and Herzegovina and the Federal Republic of Yugoslavia (of which Serbia is considered sole legal successor) in 2000.

== History ==
Both countries were constituent republics within the Socialist Federal Republic of Yugoslavia. In 1992, following the breakup of Yugoslavia, Bosnia and Herzegovina proclaimed independence. This was followed by the Bosnian War, which lasted until late 1995 and ended with the signing of the Dayton Agreement.

In the aftermath of the war and the Dayton peace settlement, Bosnia and Herzegovina and the Federal Republic of Yugoslavia (Serbia and Montenegro) initiated a process of normalization. On 3 October 1996, the presidents of the two states signed a joint declaration in Paris committing to the integrity of Bosnia and Herzegovina in line with Dayton and announcing steps toward diplomatic relations, visa-free travel, and removal of restrictions on trade and business activities.

Formal bilateral relations at the level of embassies were subsequently established on 15 December 2000. The relationship has since developed through regular political contacts and a growing body of bilateral agreements, alongside periodic political tensions linked to unresolved issues from the 1990s.

In 2015, Russia vetoed a United Nations Security Council resolution that would have condemned the Srebrenica massacre as a genocide. Lobbied by the Republika Srpska and Serbia, the veto was praised by Serbian President Tomislav Nikolić stating that Russia had "prevented an attempt of smearing the entire Serbian nation as genocidal" and proven itself as a true and honest friend. A week later, invited by the Bosnian government to attend the annual Srebrenica Genocide Memorial, Serbian Prime Minister Aleksandar Vučić was attacked by a mob in the crowd with stones, bottles and other objects and had to flee the premises.

In 2021, Serbia donated 5,000 COVID-19 vaccines to Bosnia and Herzegovina.

== Political relations ==
Relations between the two countries are often overshadowed by political tensions. The legacy of the Bosnian War, including the Srebrenica genocide, remains a point of contention. Ascending to this, the sometimes secessionist actions of Republika Srpska, supported by Serbia, threaten BiH’s stability and risk reigniting ethnic conflicts.

=== War legacy and reconciliation gestures ===
A continuing element in bilateral relations has been the political and legal legacy of the 1992–1995 war. In February 2007, the International Court of Justice (ICJ), in the case Bosnia and Herzegovina v. Serbia and Montenegro, found that genocide was committed at Srebrenica and held that Serbia breached its obligation under the Genocide Convention to prevent genocide and to cooperate in punishing perpetrators, while not finding Serbia directly responsible for committing genocide.

Symbolic gestures have periodically been used to signal reconciliation. In 2005, Serbian President Boris Tadić attended the 10th anniversary commemoration at Srebrenica, a visit widely noted as the first attendance by a Serbian head of state at the memorial ceremonies. In March 2010, the Serbian parliament adopted a declaration condemning the crime committed in Srebrenica and apologizing to the victims’ families, while the text did not describe the massacre as genocide. In April 2013, Serbian President Tomislav Nikolić issued a further public apology for crimes committed by Serb forces in Bosnia and Herzegovina, including Srebrenica, again without adopting the genocide characterization.

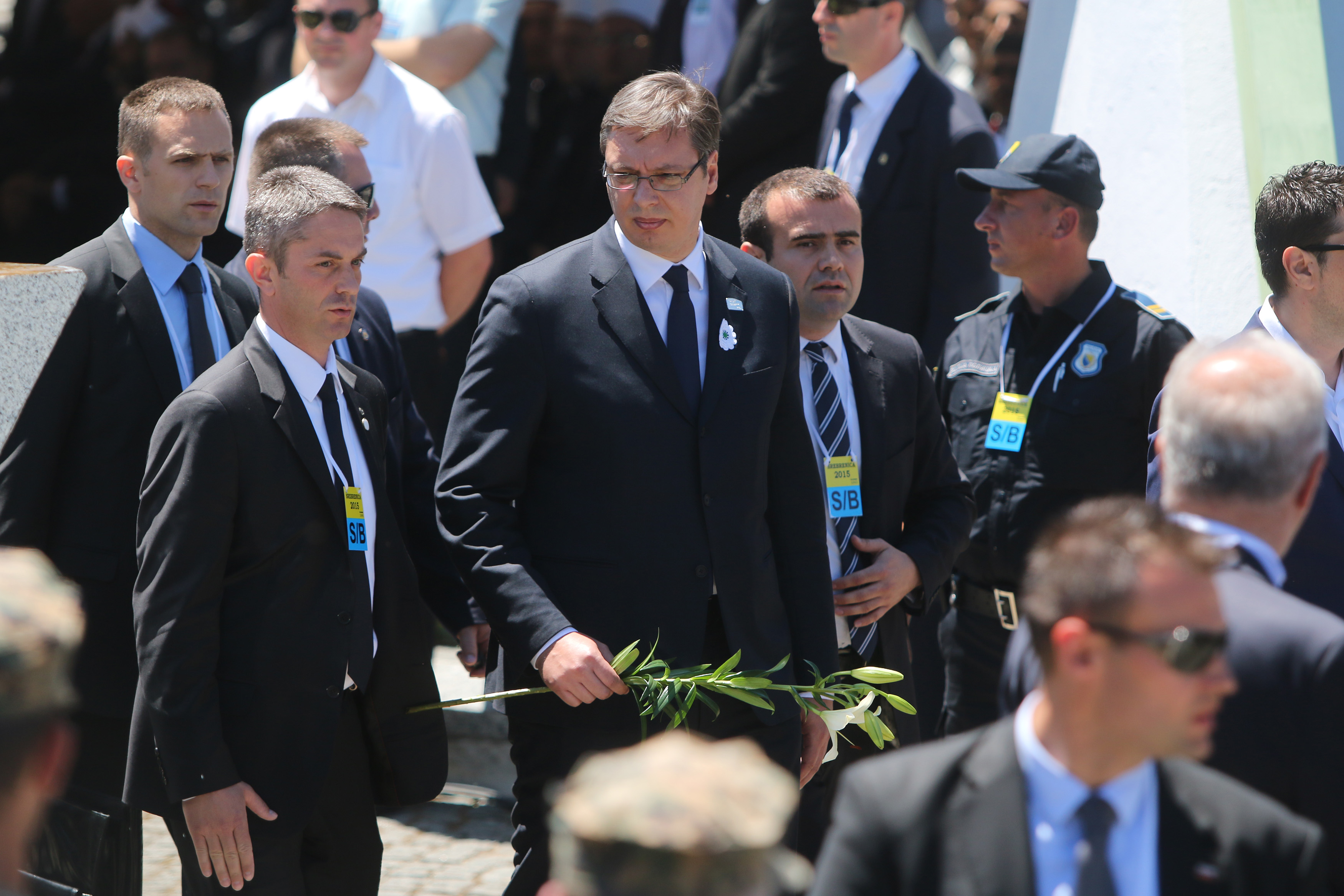
Aleksandar Vučić participating in the commemnoration ceremony of the 20th anniversary of the Srebrenica genocide

In 2015, Russia vetoed a United Nations Security Council resolution that would have condemned the Srebrenica massacre as a genocide. Lobbied by the Republika Srpska and Serbia, the veto was praised by Serbian President Tomislav Nikolić stating that Russia had "prevented an attempt of smearing the entire Serbian nation as genocidal" and proven itself as a true and honest friend. A week later, invited by the Bosnian government to attend the annual Srebrenica Genocide Memorial, Serbian Prime Minister Aleksandar Vučić was attacked by a mob in the crowd with stones, bottles and other objects and had to flee the premise.

In February 2017, a request was submitted to the International Court of Justice seeking revision of its 2007 judgment in the genocide case against Serbia. The initiative was supported by the Bosniak member of the Presidency, Bakir Izetbegović, but opposed by the Serb and Croat members. In March, the ICJ stated that no decision to seek revision had been taken by the competent authorities of Bosnia and Herzegovina and that it therefore could not take action on the request. The dispute placed additional strain on relations with Serbia.

In the 2020s, disputes over remembrance and denial have periodically resurfaced in regional politics, including controversies surrounding international initiatives to commemorate the Srebrenica massacre and condemn genocide denial. In July 2021, High Representative Valentin Inzko amended the Criminal Code of Bosnia and Herzegovina to prohibit and punish the denial of genocide, crimes against humanity and war crimes, as well as the glorification of convicted war criminals. Serbian President Aleksandar Vučić criticised the manner in which the amendments were enacted, saying that he opposed imposed decisions because they created divisions, while also paying respect to the victims of Srebrenica and calling for closer relations with Bosniaks.

In May 2024, the United Nations General Assembly adopted a resolution designating 11 July as the International Day of Reflection and Commemoration of the 1995 Genocide in Srebrenica. The resolution was adopted by 84 votes to 19, with 68 abstentions, and condemned denial of the Srebrenica genocide and the glorification of persons convicted of war crimes, crimes against humanity and genocide. Serbia opposed the resolution. Vučić described it as highly politicised and argued that it would not contribute to reconciliation, while maintaining that its adoption was intended to stigmatise Serbia and the Serbian people. The resolution stated that criminal accountability under international law is individualised and cannot be attributed to any ethnic, religious or other group or community as a whole.

Remarks made by Chairman of the Presidency of Bosnia and Herzegovina Denis Bećirović during the July 2024 commemoration also prompted a response from Serbia. The Serbian Ministry of Foreign Affairs accused Bećirović of using the commemoration for political purposes and said that his remarks did not contribute to reconciliation. The ministry also rejected criticism of the Declaration on the Protection of National and Political Rights and the Common Future of the Serbian People, maintaining that the declaration was compatible with the Dayton Agreement and did not challenge the territorial integrity of Bosnia and Herzegovina.

The funeral of Ratko Mladić in Belgrade, after which Bosnia and Herzegovina withdrew most of its embassy staff and expelled two Serbian diplomatic representatives.

In September 2026, the funeral of Ratko Mladić in Belgrade prompted a further diplomatic dispute. Mladić, who had died in United Nations custody while serving a life sentence for genocide, crimes against humanity and war crimes, was returned to Serbia aboard a Serbian government aircraft. Thousands attended his funeral on 7 September, which was presided over by Serbian Patriarch Porfirije. Mladić's coffin was accompanied by Serbian soldiers and a military band, while Defence Minister Bratislav Gašić and Justice Minister Nenad Vujić attended the funeral; President Aleksandar Vučić did not attend. Bosnia and Herzegovina's Foreign Minister Elmedin Konaković subsequently announced that all staff under his authority would be withdrawn from the country's embassy in Belgrade except the ambassador and consul, citing Serbia's handling of the funeral, the military escort and the attendance of government officials. The following day, Konaković declared two Serbian diplomatic representatives in Sarajevo persona non grata: military attaché Milan Dulanović and Darko Maksimović, an adviser to Serbia's Security Intelligence Agency representative at the embassy. Both were given 48 hours to leave Bosnia and Herzegovina.

=== Republika Srpska ===
Serbia’s political support for Bosnian Serbs, and Republika Srpska for that matter, during the Bosnian War was extensive, encompassing diplomatic advocacy, military aid, and economic assistance. The legacy of this support continues to influence Bosnian-Serbian relations, as seen in ongoing tensions over Republika Srpska’s status and historical narratives.

The Dayton agreement ensured the right for entities in Bosnia and Herzegovina to establish special parallel relationships with neighboring countries consistent with sovereignty and territorial integrity of Bosnia and Herzegovina, in this case Republika Srpska with Serbia. The Agreement on Special Parallel Relations was signed in 1997.

=== Bosnia and Herzegovina's stance on Kosovo ===
Bosnia and Herzegovina does not recognize the independence of Kosovo essentially through the veto from Republika Srpska. Bosniak and Croat members of the Presidency of Bosnia and Herzegovina support the recognition of Kosovo as a sovereign state, and Serb member does not. Bosnia and Herzegovina's constitution requires consensus among all three members in order to perform such an action. Besides Serbia, Bosnia and Herzegovina thus remains the only country of the former Yugoslavia not to recognize Kosovo's independence.

=== Cooperation ===
Despite periodic political disputes, Bosnia and Herzegovina and Serbia maintain cooperation in areas including infrastructure, border management, disaster response, and consular coordination.

An agreement on mutual consular assistance in third countries was signed in March 2012, allowing diplomatic missions of one state to provide consular services to nationals of the other in countries where they lack representation.

Cooperation has also included joint formats between executive institutions. In November 2015, the Government of Serbia and the Council of Ministers of Bosnia and Herzegovina held a joint session in Sarajevo, during which protocols and cooperation documents were signed in several fields. Such meetings have been framed by both sides as a mechanism to improve operational coordination and address practical issues such as trade facilitation, transport links and the implementation of bilateral agreements.

In cross-border governance and local development, Bosnia and Herzegovina and Serbia participate in EU-supported cross-border cooperation programmes financed through the Instrument for Pre-accession Assistance (IPA). The European Commission adopted financing and programme documents for the 2021–2027 cross-border cooperation programme between Serbia and Bosnia and Herzegovina. The programme supports cooperation between institutions and local stakeholders in border regions, including projects related to employment, environmental protection and risk management.

Transport and border infrastructure projects have included agreements related to joint border crossing facilities such as Bratunac and cooperation on road infrastructure maintenance. The two governments have repeatedly cited connectivity projects as a priority, including proposals for the Belgrade–Sarajevo motorway intended to strengthen economic ties and cross-border mobility.

Disaster response has been another area of cooperation, particularly after large-scale flooding in the region in 2014. Both countries have since participated in regional coordination efforts related to civil protection and emergency response, including information exchange and operational cooperation during extreme weather events.

During the COVID-19 pandemic, Serbia allowed citizens of Bosnia and Herzegovina to receive vaccination in Serbia, which was widely reported in the region as part of Serbia's broader vaccine outreach policy in 2021. Bosnia and Herzegovina also received donations of COVID-19 vaccines from Serbia in early 2021.

== Economic relations ==
Serbia is the third biggest trading partner of Bosnia and Herzegovina (behind Germany and Italy). Trade between two countries amounted to €2.5 billion in 2025; Serbia's merchandise export to Bosnia and Herzegovina were over $1.6 billion; Bosnia and Herzegovina's exports were standing at €974.7 million.

Serbian public telecommunications company Telekom Srbija is the owner of Mtel, the biggest telecom operator in Bosnia and Herzegovina.

== Serbs in Bosnia and Herzegovina ==
Serbs are one of the three constituent peoples of Bosnia and Herzegovina. According to data from the 2013 census, the population of ethnic Serbs in Bosnia and Herzegovina was 1,086,733, constituting 30.8% of the total population; they are the second-largest ethnic group in the country (after Bosniaks) and live predominantly in Republika Srpska.

== Bosniaks in Serbia ==
Bosniaks in Serbia are a recognized ethnic minority group. They are the fourth largest ethnic group after Serbs, Hungarians and Roma, numbering 153,801 and constituting 2.3% of the total population. The vast majority of them live in the region of Sandžak in southwestern Serbia.

== Resident diplomatic missions ==
- Bosnia and Herzegovina has an embassy in Belgrade and consulate general in Novi Pazar.
- Serbia has an embassy in Sarajevo and consulates-general in Banja Luka and Mostar, with consular offices in Drvar and Trebinje.
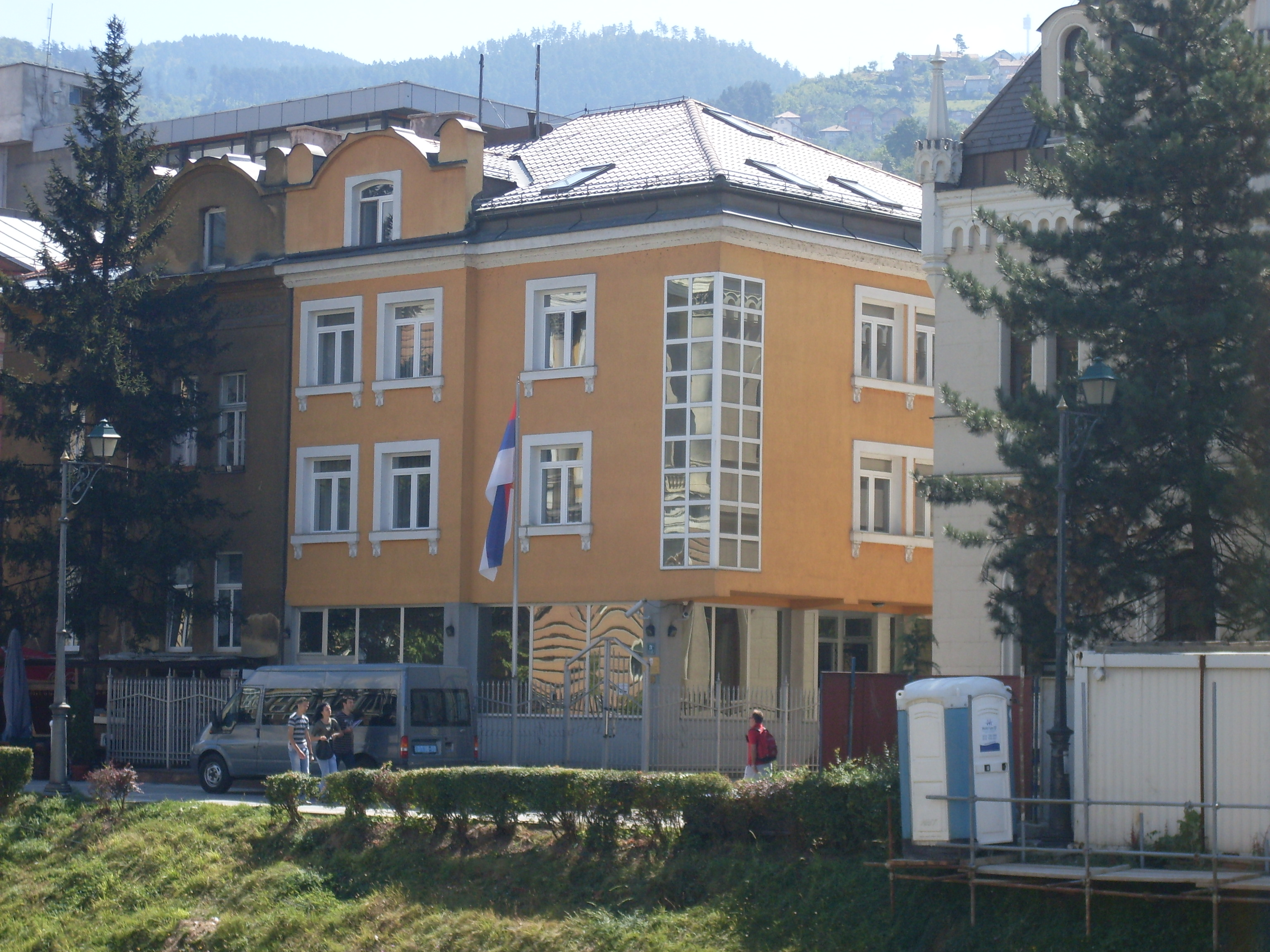
Embassy of Serbia in Sarajevo

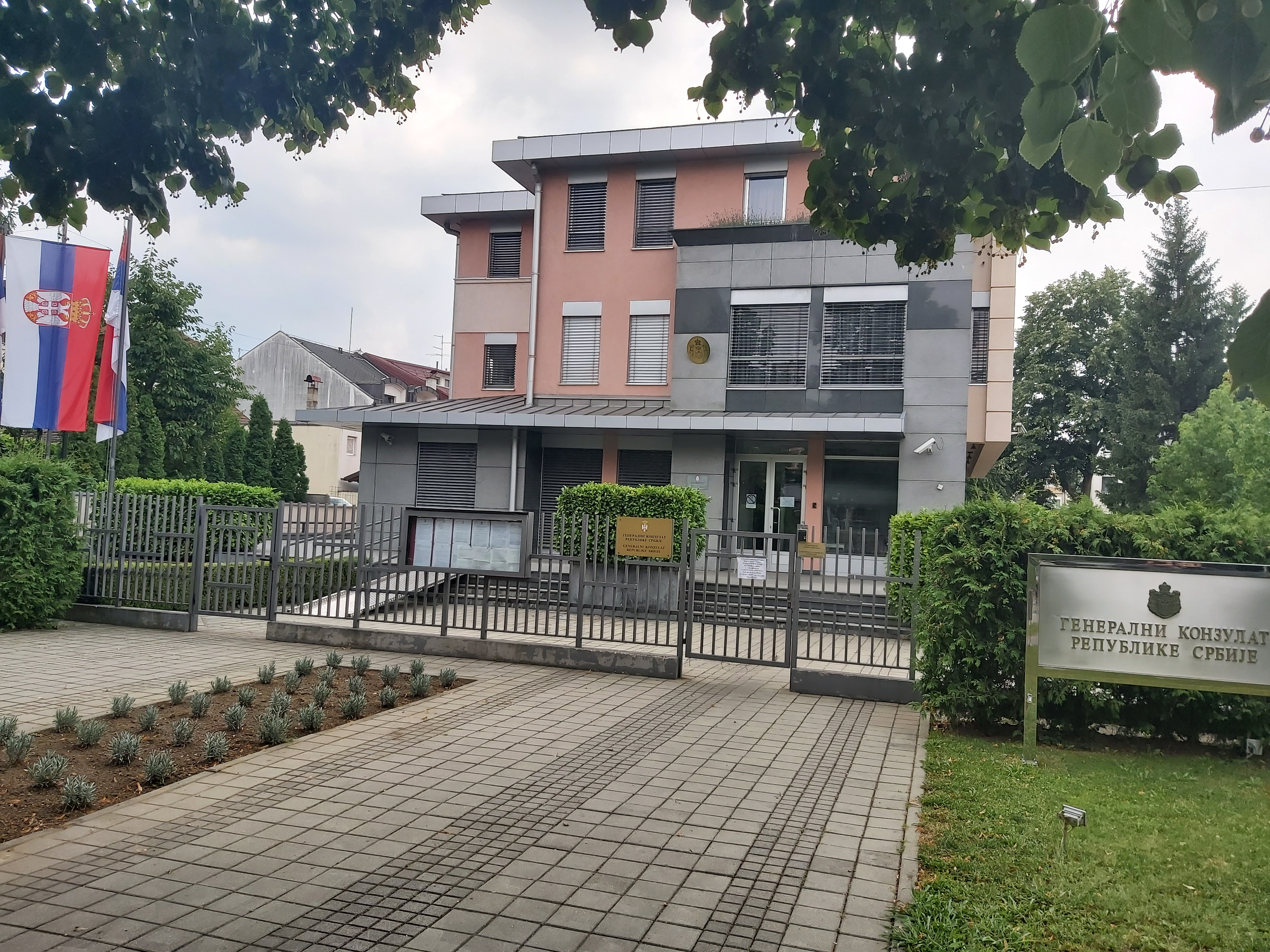
Consulate general of Serbia in Banja Luka

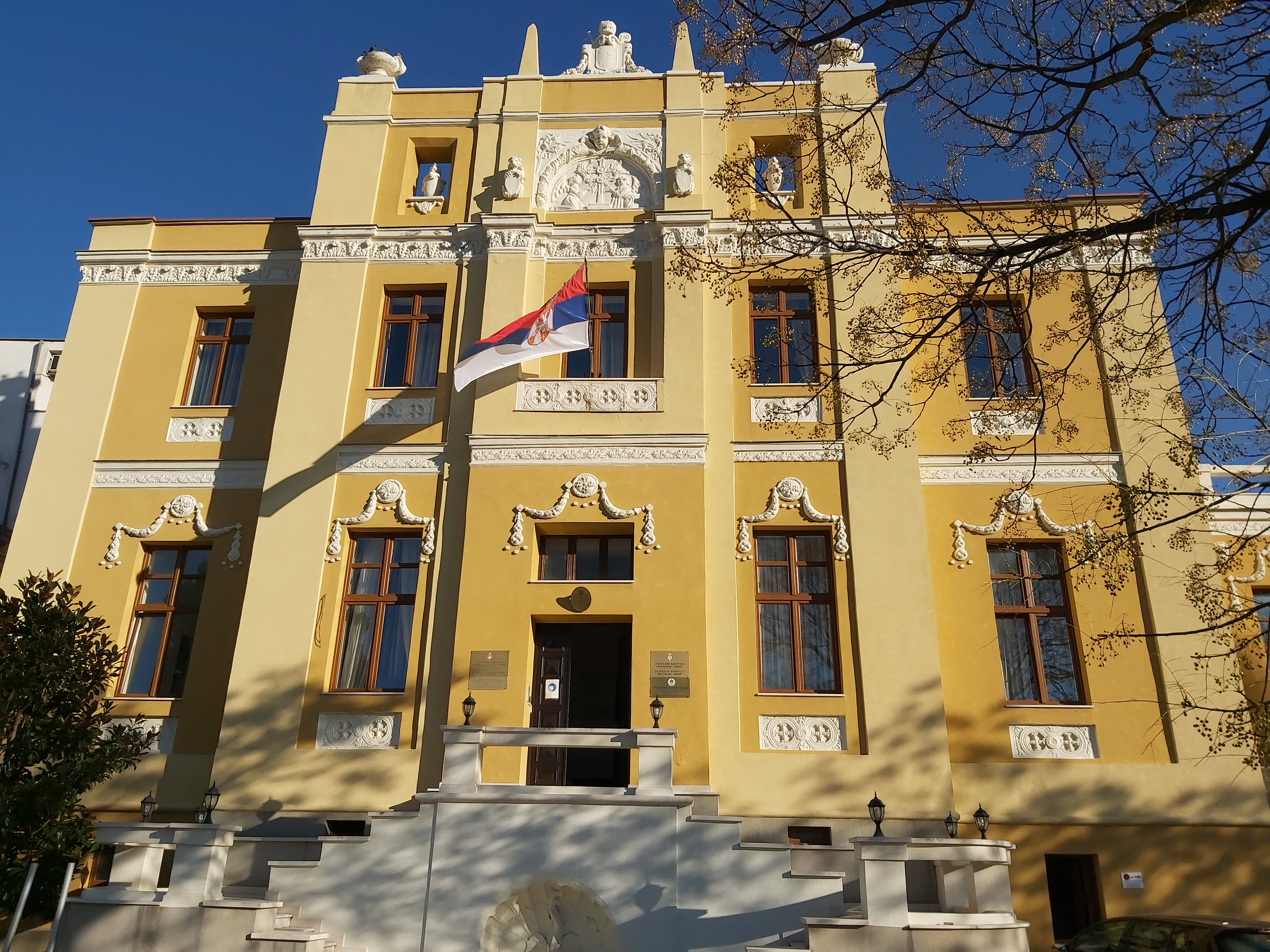
Consulate general of Serbia in Mostar

== See also ==
- Foreign relations of Bosnia and Herzegovina
- Foreign relations of Serbia
- Agreement on Succession Issues of the Former Socialist Federal Republic of Yugoslavia
