= Flag Day (United Arab Emirates) =

National occasion in the United Arab Emirates

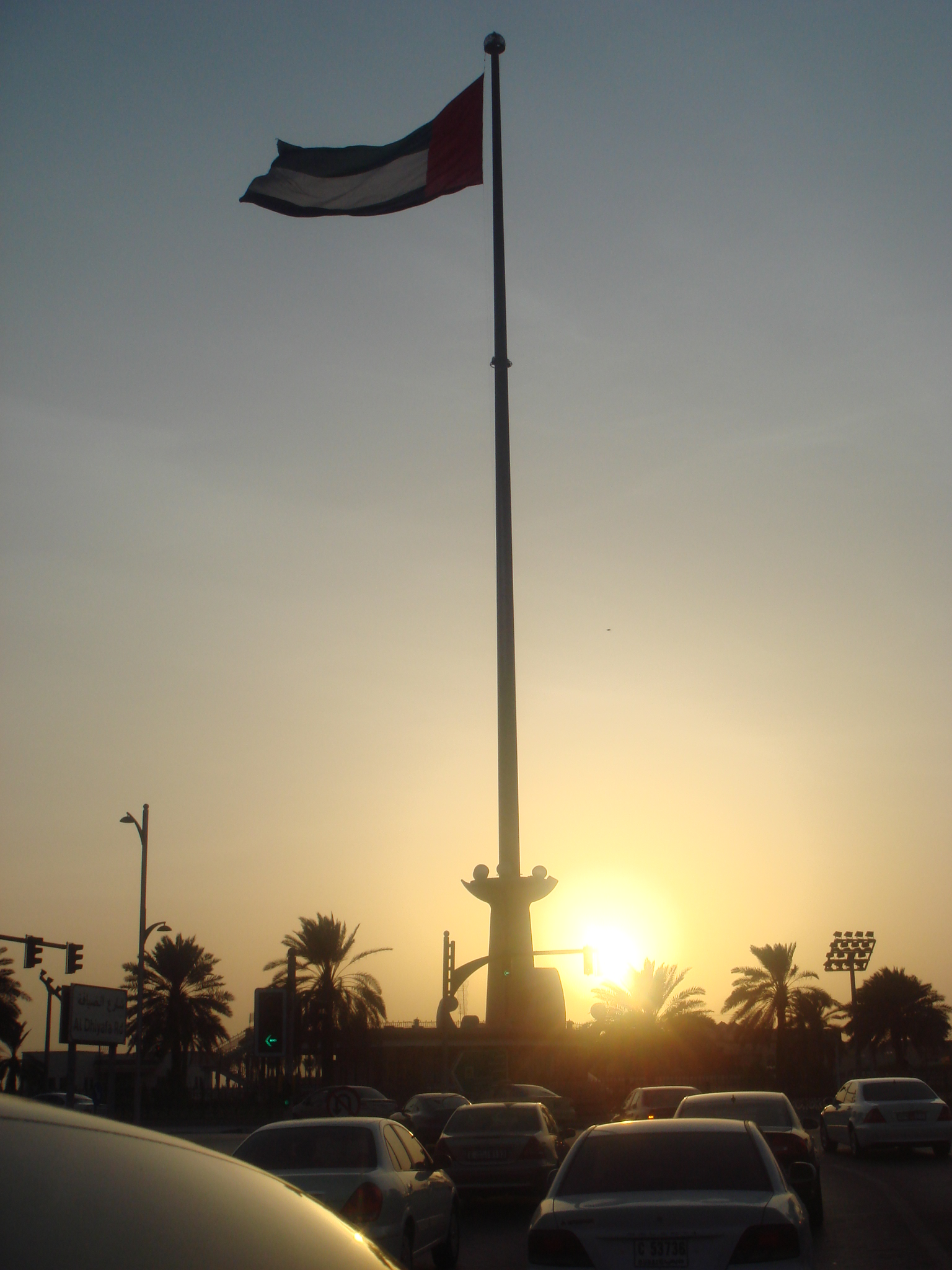
- Observed by: United Arab Emirates (U.A.E)
- Type: Patriotic, Historical, Nationalist
- Significance: Anniversary of the inauguration of Late Sheikh Khalifa bin Zayed Al Nahyan as former President, Commemoration of the founders of UAE.
- Observances: Flag raising ceremonies
- Date: 3 November
- Next time: 3 November 2026
- Duration: 5 day
- Frequency: Annual

The United Arab Emirates (U.A.E) Flag Day is a national occasion where people of the UAE remember the efforts of the founders of their State, Sheikh Zayed and Sheikh Rashid, and their brothers who sacrificed everything for the sake of their nation. It is a day when the national spirit is renewed, and an occasion to reflect on the achievements of the era of the late President Sheikh Khalifa bin Zayed Al Nahyan.

The UAE flag represents meanings of justice, peace, tolerance, power and moderation, under which all Emiratis live a decent life and enjoy security and stability. This comes in continuation of the legacy of the late Sheikh Zayed bin Sultan Al Nahyan. on UAE flag day people also usually wear clothing in the colors of the UAE flag or carry a small flag with you to join in the national pride.

== Commemoration ==
The Flag Day marks the anniversary of Sheikh Khalifa Bin Zayed Al Nahyan becoming the president in 2004. Every year on 3 November, people in the Emirates celebrate this national occasion, in which they reaffirm their allegiance to the UAE flag, which is a symbol of the country's unity is an opportunity to remember the efforts of the founding fathers – Sheikh Zayed, Sheikh Rashid and their brothers from five other emirates. As Sheikh Mohammed bin Rashid, Vice President and Ruler of Dubai, said, they "sacrificed everything for the sake of our nation". Because of their vision, the country was able to become a modern and ambitious state. Sheikh Mohammed bin Zayed spoke of the country's "unity, cohesion and solidarity" in a Flag Day address. "We raise the flag today to show our great love and appreciation for the UAE President for his national efforts and his continuous initiatives to keep the nation high and cherished," said the then Crown Prince of Abu Dhabi and Deputy Supreme Commander of the Armed Forces, via Twitter.

=== National anthem ===
On this day, Emiratis across the UAE sing the country's national anthem and host the flag atop their buildings and at their backyards. They organize a gala at their new headquarters and salute the flag in the reflection of their belonging to their homeland countries, their loyalty to their prudent leadership and in glorification of the country's national symbols. They organize a number of lectures and competitions about the history of the flag, its colors, and elements of national identity in addition to awareness messages, tweets, and constant updates through social media channels.

=== External links ===
- Celebrating UAE Flag Day
