= 2004 in Serbia and Montenegro =

- Decades: 1980s; 1990s; 2000s; 2010s; 2020s
- See also: History of Serbia; Timeline of Serbian history; List of years in Serbia

== Incumbents ==
- President: Nataša Mićić (until 27 January), Dragan Maršićanin (4 February to 3 March), Vojislav Mihailović (3 March to 4 March), Predrag Marković (4 March to 11 July), Boris Tadić (from 11 July)
- Prime Minister: Zoran Živković (until 4 March), Vojislav Koštunica (from 4 March)

== Events ==
- 4 April – A bus carrying 16 adults and 34 children from Svishtov, on the way back from a school trip to Dubrovnik, ran off the road and into the river Lim near Gostun around 21:00 local time. Four boys and eight girls were killed. The driver Iliya Izmirliev was later sentenced to four years in prison.
