= 2026 in Serbia =

- Decades: 2000s; 2010s; 2020s
- See also: History of Serbia; Timeline of Serbian history; List of years in Serbia

Events in the year 2026 in Serbia.

== Incumbents ==
- President: Aleksandar Vučić (until 28 September); Ana Brnabić (acting, since 28 September)
- Prime Minister: Đuro Macut
- President of the National Assembly: Ana Brnabić

== Events ==
=== Ongoing ===
- 2024–present Serbian anti-corruption protests

=== January ===
- 26 January – A coordinated blockade is held by truck drivers in border crossings nationwide in protest over the implementation of the Entry/Exit System by the European Union.
- 29 January – In the largest drug bust in Serbian history, authorities arrest two people and seize five tonnes of marijuana following a raid in Konjuh, Kruševac.

=== February ===
- 24–28 February – Pesma za Evroviziju '26 is held, with Lavina winning with their song Kraj mene.

=== March ===
- 29 March — 2026 Serbian local elections are held.

=== April ===
- 5 April — A bag of explosives is discovered near the TurkStream gas pipeline in Trešnjevac.

=== May ===
- 14 May – A man rams his car into an antigovernment protest in Belgrade, injuring one person.

=== August ===
- 28 August – Justice minister Nenad Vujić declares that deceased genocide convict Ratko Mladić "will receive all the military and state honors to which he is entitled."

=== September ===
- 7 September – Thousands attend Ratko Mladić's funeral in Belgrade, with the service being led by Patriach Porfirije.
- 17 September – President Vucic inaugurates an assembly plant for drones made by Israeli manufacturer Elbit Systems.
- 27 September – Aleksandar Vučić resigns as president.

=== October ===
- 19 October – The Citizen Lab announces that two Serbian opposition figures were targeted with Pegasus spyware, a claim denied by the government.
- 25 October – 2026 Serbian parliamentary election: The opposition Student List wins a majority of seats in the National Assembly.
- 28 October – A minor is killed after assaulting a guard outside the Israeli Embassy in Belgrade.

=== November ===
- 17 November – A MiG-29 fighter jet crashes into ‌a field near Stara Pazova, killing a pilot.

== Holidays ==
- 1 January – New Year's Day
- 7 January – Christmas Day
- 27 January – Saint Sava's Day
- 16–17 February – National Day
- 10 April – Orthodox Good Friday
- 13 April – Orthodox Easter
- 22 April – National Holocaust, World War II Genocide and other Fascist Crimes Victims Remembrance Day
- 1 May – Labour Day
- 9 May – Victory Day
- 28 June – Saint Vitus' Day
- 15 September – Serbian Unity Day
- 21 October – World War II Serbian Victims Remembrance Day
- 11 November – Armistice Day

== Deaths ==
- 23 January – Ðani Kovač, 86, Olympic sprinter (1960, 1964)
- 13 February – Tatjana Ječmenica, 47, tennis player
- 21 February – Vladislav Jovanović, 92, minister of foreign affairs (1992, 1993–1995)
- 6 March – Gyula Gobby Fehér, 82, writer (death announced on this date)
- 26 May – Dragoljub Mićunović, 95, president of the chamber of citizens of the Federal Assembly of Yugoslavia (2000–2003) and the Assembly of Serbia and Montenegro (2003–2004)
- 10 September – Ajazdin Nuhi, 46, footballer (Čukarički, Zeta, OFK Beograd).
- 24 September – Milan Panić, 96, founder of ICN Pharmaceuticals, prime minister and minister of defence of FR Yugoslavia (1992–1993).
- 12 October – Vladimir Vuletić, 47, lawyer.
