= 2022 in Serbia =

- Decades: 2000s; 2010s; 2020s
- See also: Other events of 2022; List of years in Serbia

Events in the year 2022 in Serbia.

== Incumbents ==
- President: Aleksandar Vučić
- Prime Minister: Ana Brnabić
- President of the National Assembly: Ivica Dačić (until 1 August); Vladimir Orlić onwards

== Events ==
Ongoing — COVID-19 pandemic in Serbia

- 11 January – Patriarch Porfirije, the head of the Serbian Orthodox Church, tests positive for COVID-19.
- 15 January – In an extraordinary session, the Assembly of the Republic of Kosovo votes to ban Kosovo Serbs from voting in Serbia's upcoming constitutional referendum on Kosovan territory.
- 16 January – 2022 Serbian constitutional referendum: Serbians vote in a referendum on whether to approve a constitutional reform that would bring the Serbian judicial system closer to the model required for the country to join the European Union.
- 15 February – The 2021–2022 Serbian environmental protests end following the dissolution of the National Assembly of Serbia.
- 1 April – Eight people are killed and 20 more are injured during a coal mine collapse in Aleksinac, Serbia.
- 3 April – 2022 Serbian general election:
  - Serbians vote in the presidential and parliamentary elections.
  - President Aleksandar Vučić is re-elected with 60.0% of the vote, and his party Serbian Progressive Party wins the most votes in the National Assembly at 42.9% though fail to win an overall majority of seats.
- 5 June – Russian Foreign Minister Sergey Lavrov cancels his scheduled visit to Serbia after neighbouring states in the Balkans refuse to let Lavrov's plane use their airspace.
- 17 June – Serbia reports its first case of monkeypox.
- 16 July – An Antonov An-12 cargo plane, operated by a Ukrainian airline, crashes near the city of Kavala, Greece, killing all eight people on board. The aircraft was carrying weapons from Serbia to Bangladesh, and crashed before a planned stop in Jordan.
- 17 July – Croatia refuses to allow a private visit from the President of Serbia Aleksandar Vučić to the site of the Jasenovac concentration camp due to the Government of Croatia not being formally notified of the visit.
- 31 July – Kosovo Police close two border crossings in North Kosovo after local Serbs blocked roads and fired shots at police to protest an order to switch Serbian car license plates to Kosovan ones within two months.
- 27 August – Kosovan prime minister Albin Kurti and Serbian president Aleksandar Vučić agree on a freedom of movement arrangement between Kosovo and Serbia.
- 3 October – Serbian Party Oathkeepers Together with the People's Party, New Democratic Party of Serbia, and Dveri, signed a joint declaration for the "reintegration of Kosovo into the constitutional and legal order of Serbia" in October 2022.
- 23 November – Kosovo and Serbia agree an EU-brokered deal to end a dispute over Kosovar license plates in North Kosovo, which triggered protests last year.
- 26 November – FIFA announces that they will discipline the Serbia national football team for hanging a banner in their locker room that showed the territory of Kosovo as part of Serbia. Kosovar authorities condemned the incident.
- 9 December – Serbian Prime Minister Ana Brnabić says Serbia is close to deploying its troops to North Kosovo after claiming the lives of the Serb minority there are "being threatened," and that the NATO-led Kosovo Force was "failing to protect them."
- 11 December – 2022 North Kosovo crisis: Serbian President Aleksandar Vučić calls an emergency meeting of the National Security Council. After the meeting, Vučić states that "it is important to call on Serbs and Albanians to keep the peace" and that he "made certain decisions and gave orders."
- 15 December – Serbian President Aleksandar Vučić announced that the Serbian government will send a request to KFOR for the return of a certain number, "from hundreds to a thousand", of police and army personnel to Kosovo, in accordance with UN Resolution 1244.

== Sports ==
- 21 May – 2021–22 EuroLeague
  - In basketball, Anadolu Efes defeat Real Madrid 58–57 in the championship game at Štark Arena in Belgrade, Serbia, to win their second EuroLeague title.
- 10 July – Novak Djokovic of Serbia wins his seventh Wimbledon and overall 21st Grand Slam title after defeating Nick Kyrgios of Australia in the men's singles final, 4–6, 6–3, 6–4, 7–6 (7–3).

== Deaths ==
- 3 January – Vladan Živković, 80, actor (England Made Me, Cross of Iron, A Tight Spot)
- 23 January –
  - Božidar Đurašević, 88, chess player
  - Lavrentije Trifunović, 86, Orthodox prelate, eparch of Western Europe (1973–1989) and Šabac (since 1989)
- 24 January –
  - Stevan K. Pavlowitch, 88, Serbian-born British historian
  - Borislav Stevanović, 46, footballer (Radnički Niš, Rad, BASK)
- 4 February – Srboljub Nikolić, 56, football player (HNK Šibenik, FK Bor) and manager (Jasenica)
- 7 February – Miodrag Mitić, 62, Olympic volleyball player (1980)
- 9 February – Snežana Pantić, 43, karateka
- 14 February – Borislav Ivkov, 88, chess grandmaster.
- 11 March – Nebojša Vučićević, 59, football player (OFK Beograd, Partizan) and manager (Hajduk Kula)
- 12 March – Dragoljub Jeremić, 43, footballer (Partizan, Radnički Kragujevac, Bežanija)
- 16 March – Slobodan Škrbić, 77, footballer (Red Star Belgrade, Lille OSC, Yugoslavia national team)
- 22 March – Milovan Vitezović, 77, writer, professor and screenwriter
- 25 March – Milivoj Karakašević, 73, table tennis player
- 3 April – Snežana Nikšić, 78, actress (Siberian Lady Macbeth, The Tiger, Bolji život)
- 7 April – Dušan Čkrebić, 94, politician, prime minister (1974–1978) and president (1984–1986)
- 23 April – Milenko Kovačević, 58, footballer (Mačva Šabac, Rad, Apollon Athens)
- 28 April – Zoran Sretenović, 57, basketball player (Crvena zvezda, Jugoplastika) and coach (Železničar Inđija), European champion (1991, 1995)
- 30 April – Gabe Serbian, 44, American hardcore punk drummer and guitarist (The Locust, Dead Cross)
- 15 May – Stevan Ostojić, 80, footballer (Red Star Belgrade, Yugoslavia national team)
- 20 May – Vladimir Nenadić, 51, footballer (Bečej, Vojvodina, 1. FC Tatran)
- 21 June – Dragan Tomić, 86, politician, acting president (1997), president of the National Assembly (1994–2001)
- 9 July – Ljiljana Bakić, 82–83, architect
- 18 July – Bajram Haliti, 67, author
- 21 July – Nikola Radmanović, 53, footballer (Red Star Belgrade, Mérida)
- 25 July – Milenko Stefanović, 92, classical and jazz clarinetist
- 26 July – Branko Cvejić, 75, actor (Grlom u jagode, The Elusive Summer of '68, Balkan Express)
- 1 August – Milan Đuričić, 60, football manager (Vojvodina, Inđija, Radnički Niš)
- 13 August – Desanka Kovačević-Kojić, 96, historian
- 23 August – Božidar Delić, 66, military officer and politician, vice president of the National Assembly (2007–2012, since 2022)
- 25 August – Radovan Radović, 86, basketball player (BSK, Kartizan, 1960 Yugoslav Olympic team) and coach
- 26 August – Slavko Večerin, 65, Roman Catholic prelate, bishop of Subotica (since 2020)
- 27 August – Milutin Šoškić, 84, football player (Partizan, Yugoslavia national team) and manager (OFK Beograd), Olympic champion (1960)
- 13 September – Kornelije Kovač, 80, composer and musician (Korni Grupa, Indexi)
- 18 September – Svetozar Saša Kovačević, 72, composer, music pedagogue and church organist
- 25 September –
  - Radovan Radaković, 51, football manager and player
  - Srbijanka Turajlić, 76, academic and political activist
- 14 October – Ljubisav Rakić, 91, neurobiologist and academic
- 24 October – Milomir Kovac, 60, Serbian-German veterinary surgeon, equine specialist and columnist
- 27 October – Vladimir Gligorov, 77, economist
- 2 November – Dejan Mikavica, 58, historian and politician, deputy (2004–2007).
- 12 November – Goran Kovačević, 51–52, politician, deputy (since 2014).
- 23 November –
  - Milovan Danojlić, 85, poet, essayist and literary critic, member of the Serbian Academy of Sciences and Arts.
  - Puriša Đorđević, 98, film director (Girl, The Morning, Noon) and screenwriter.
- 28 November – Rajko Petrov Nogo, 77, poet and essayist
- 7 December – Stevan Vrbaški, 81–82, politician, mayor of Novi Sad (1997–2000).
- 8 December – Miodrag Ješić, 64, football player (Yugoslavia national team) and manager (Partizan, Altay)
- 12 December – Latinka Perović, 89, historian and politician
- 16 December – Siniša Mihajlović, 53, football player (Lazio, FR Yugoslavia national team) and manager (Bologna)
- 20 December – Dejan Tiago-Stanković, 57, Serbian-Portuguese writer and translator.
- 29 December – Mihalj Kertes, 75, politician, minister without portfolio (1993–1994).
