= 2027 in Serbia =

- Decades: 2000s; 2010s; 2020s
- See also: History of Serbia; Timeline of Serbian history; List of years in Serbia

Events in the year 2027 in Serbia.

== Events ==
=== Predicted and scheduled ===
- 15 May – 15 August – Expo 2027
- 17 June – 4 July – 2027 UEFA European Under-21 Championship in Albania and Serbia

== Holidays ==
- 1 January – New Year's Day
- 7 January – Christmas Day
- 27 January – Saint Sava's Day
- 15–16 February – National Day
- 22 April – National Holocaust, World War II Genocide and other Fascist Crimes Victims Remembrance Day
- 30 April – Orthodox Good Friday
- 1 May – Orthodox Easter
- 1 May – Labour Day
- 9 May – Victory Day
- 28 June – Saint Vitus' Day
- 15 September – Serbian Unity Day
- 21 October – World War II Serbian Victims Remembrance Day
- 11 November – Armistice Day
