= 2023 in Serbia =

- Decades: 2000s; 2010s; 2020s
- See also: History of Serbia; Timeline of Serbian history; List of years in Serbia

Events in the year 2023 in Serbia.

== Incumbents ==
- President: Aleksandar Vučić
- Prime Minister: Ana Brnabić
- President of the National Assembly: Vladimir Orlić

== Events ==
Ongoing — COVID-19 pandemic in Serbia

- 8 January – NATO rejects Serbia's request to deploy up to 1,000 of Serbia's troops and military police in North Kosovo.
- 3 May – Belgrade school shooting: a 13-year-old student kills ten people.
- 4 May – Mladenovac and Smederevo shootings: a 21 year-old man kills nine people.
- 8 May - 4 November - Serbia Against Violence protests: Tens of thousands of people gather on the streets multiple times following two shootings in May.
- 14 June – Serbian forces detain three Kosovo Police officers, accusing them of illegally crossing the border. Kosovan Prime Minister Albin Kurti denies the Serbian claims, saying that the officers were arrested 300 metres inside Kosovan territory, and demands their immediate release.
- 17 December – 2023 Serbian parliamentary election:
  - Serbians elect members of the National Assembly.
  - President Aleksandar Vučić declares victory for his Serbian Progressive Party, claiming a majority with 127 seats, while opposition leader Radomir Lazović of the Green–Left Front raises concerns of electoral irregularities including vote buying and falsification.
- 24 December – 2023 Serbian election protests: Hundreds of opposition supporters in Belgrade, Serbia, are tear gassed by police outside the City Assembly building while protesting alleged vote irregularities during last week's general election.

== Deaths ==
- 4 January – Zoran Kalezić, 72, Serbian-Montenegrin singer.
- 5 January – Dušan Veličković, 75–76, writer, journalist and filmmaker.
- 7 January – Zinaid Memišević, 72, Bosnian-Serbian actor (2012, Miracle, Bolji život).
- 8 January – Borislav Dević, 59, Olympic marathoner (1996).
- 9 January – Charles Simic, 84, Serbian-born American poet.
- 13 January – Gordana Kuić, 80, novelist (The Scent of Rain in the Balkans).
- 27 January – Saša Petrović, 61, Bosnian-Serbian actor (It's Hard to Be Nice, Fuse, Lud, zbunjen, normalan).
- 8 February – Branka Veselinović, 104, actress (A Child of the Community).
- 12 March – Dragoslav Mihailović, 92, writer.
- 16 April – Slobodan Lalović, 68, politician, Minister of Labour, Employment, and Social Policy (2004–2007).
- 2 July – Milan Milutinović, 80, politician, President of Serbia (1997–2002).
- 15 July – Danica Mastilović, 89, operatic soprano.
