= 2021 in Serbia =

- Decades: 2000s; 2010s; 2020s
- See also: History of Serbia; Timeline of Serbian history; List of years in Serbia

Events in the year 2021 in Serbia.

== Incumbents ==
- President: Aleksandar Vučić
- Prime Minister: Ana Brnabić
- President of the National Assembly: Ivica Dačić

== Events ==
Ongoing — COVID-19 pandemic in Serbia
Ongoing - Protests against proposed Rio Tinto mining operations

- 12 April: The start of the 2021 Balkan non-papers.
  - The paper called for the "peaceful dissolution" of Bosnia and Herzegovina with the annexation of Republika Srpska and great parts of Herzegovina and Central Bosnia into a Greater Serbia and Greater Croatia, leaving a small Bosniak state in what is central and western Bosnia,
- July 23 – August 8 - 87 athletes from Serbia will compete at the 2020 Summer Olympics in Tokyo, Japan.
- 27 November - Hundreds of environmental protesters blocked several major roads in Serbia on Saturday to protest against two new laws that they say will give free rein to foreign mining companies in the country. Serbia's government has offered mineral resources to companies including China's Zijin copper miner and Rio Tinto, but green activists say the projects would pollute land and water in the Balkan nation. Chanting slogans against the government and conservative President Aleksandar Vucic, demonstrators brought traffic to a standstill in the centre of Belgrade and blocked a stretch of a main highway through the Serbian capital. In the northern city of Novi Sad, dozens of protesters briefly scuffled with police and protest organisers said several activists had been detained.

== Deaths ==
- January 7 – Biserka Cvejić, opera singer (b. 1923).
- January 25 – Dobrivoje Tošković, 93-94, architect, urban planner, and university professor.
- February 19 – Đorđe Balašević, singer-songwriter (b. 1953).
- March 6 – Boris Komnenić, actor (b. 1957).
- April 6 - Predrag Živković Tozovac, singer
