= 2017 in Serbia =

- Decades: 1990s; 2000s; 2010s; 2020s
- See also: Other events of 2017; List of years in Serbia

Events in the year 2017 in Serbia.

== Incumbents ==
- President: Tomislav Nikolić (until 31 May), Aleksandar Vučić (starting 31 May)
- Prime Minister:
  - until 31 May: Aleksandar Vučić
  - 31 May-29 June: Ivica Dačić (acting)
  - starting 29 June: Ana Brnabić

== Events ==
- 2 April – The Serbian presidential election of 2017 were held.
- 17 September – The Serbia men's national basketball team gets runners up in Eurobasket 2017.

== Deaths ==
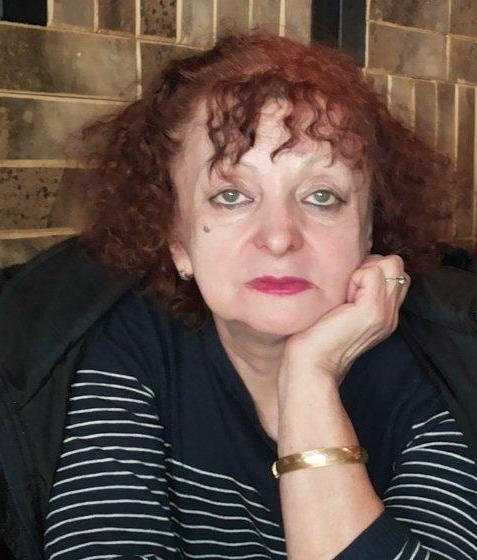
Jovanka Nikolić

- 4 January – Vlastimir Trajković, composer (b. 1947).
- 8 January – Jovanka Nikolić, writer (b. 1952).
- 23 January – Boško Krunić, politician (b. 1929).
