= 2015 in Serbia =

- Decades: 1990s; 2000s; 2010s; 2020s
- See also: History of Serbia; Timeline of Serbian history; List of years in Serbia

The following lists events that happened during 2015 in Serbia.

== Incumbents ==
- President: Tomislav Nikolić
- Prime Minister: Aleksandar Vučić

== Musical events ==
- Serbia in the Eurovision Song Contest 2015

== Sport ==
=== Basketball ===
- 2014–15 ABA League Champions: KK Crvena zvezda.
- 2015 Euroleague MVP: Nemanja Bjelica. Serbian players dominated the list.
- EuroBasket Women 2015 Champions

=== Tennis ===
- 2015 Novak Djokovic tennis season: ranked no. 1
  - 2015 Laureus World Sports Award for Sportsman of the Year

=== Football ===
- 2015 FIFA U-20 World Cup: The under-20 national team win the FIFA U-20 World Cup in New Zealand after defeating Brazil 2–1 in the final

=== Water polo ===
- 2015 FINA Men's Water Polo World League Champions

== Deaths ==
- 5 March: Vlada Divljan (aged 56), singer and songwriter.
- 26 April: Miladin Stevanović "Cakan" (aged 74), one of the best pilots of Serbia.
- 3 April: Bogoljub Stepanović (aged 71), president of the Judge Commission of the Football Association of Serbia.
- 6 April: Darko Broćić (aged 50), audience measurer.
- 6 April: Konstantin Zečević (aged 94), footballer.
