= 2020 in Serbia =

- Decades: 2000s; 2010s; 2020s
- See also: Other events of 2020; List of years in Serbia

Events in the year 2020 in Serbia.

== Incumbents ==
- President: Aleksandar Vučić
- Prime Minister: Ana Brnabić

== Events ==
- 21 June – 2020 Serbian parliamentary election.

== Deaths ==
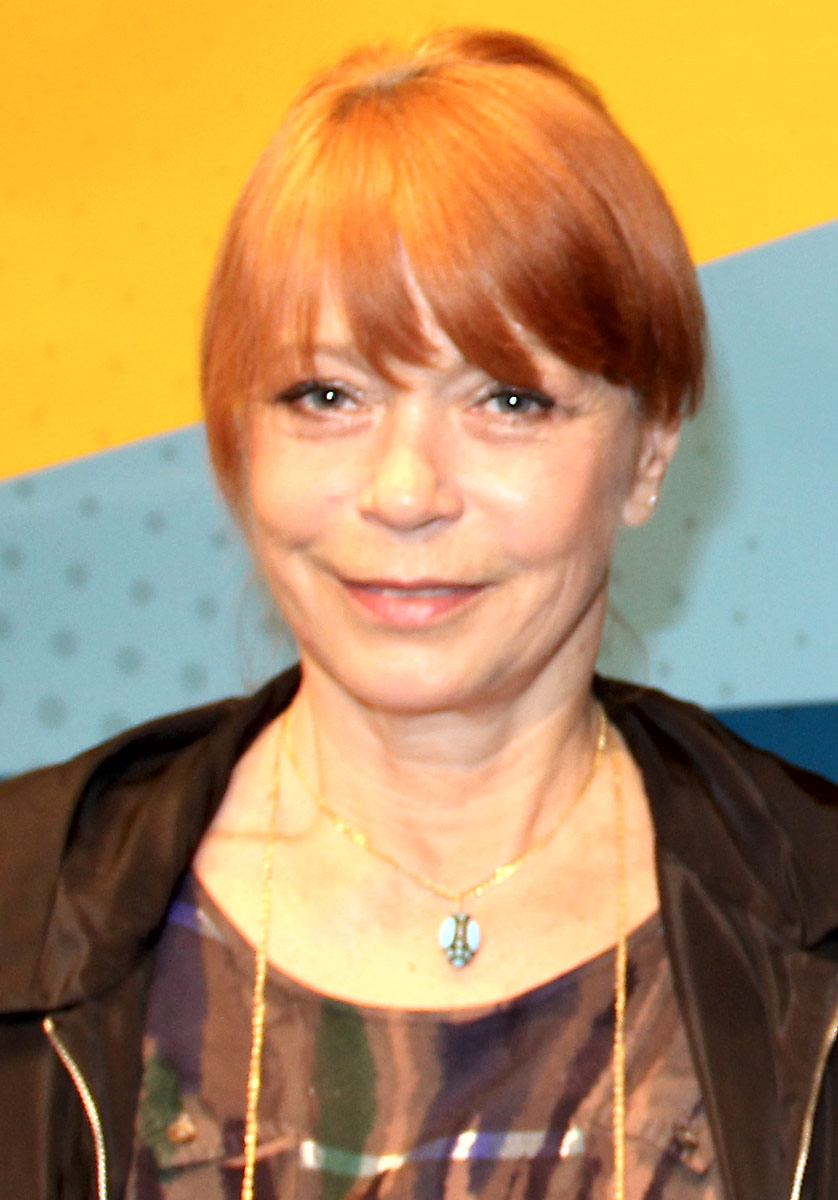
Neda Arnerić

- 10 January – Neda Arnerić, actress (b. 1953).
- 15 January – Milovan Stepandić, basketball coach (b. 1954).
- 26 June – Ilija Petković, Serbian footballer and manager (b. 1945)
- 31 July – Miodrag Živković, sculptor (b. 1928).
- 7 August – Michael Ojo, Nigerian-American basketball player (b. 1993)
