= 2019 in Serbia =

- Decades: 1990s; 2000s; 2010s; 2020s
- See also: Other events of 2019; List of years in Serbia

Events of 2019 in Serbia.

== Incumbents ==
- President: Aleksandar Vučić
- Prime Minister: Ana Brnabić

== Events ==
- January 17 – State Visit of Russian President Vladimir Putin to Belgrade.
- August 18 – "Miloš the Great" Highway, a section of Corridor XI (or A2 motorway; part of the E761 and E763 European routes) from Obrenovac to Preljina, is opened.

== Deaths ==
- January 5 – Dragoslav Šekularac, footballer and manager (b. 1937)
- January 24 – Dušan Makavejev, film director (b. 1932)
- February 4 – Darinka Jandrić, nurse and war heroine (b. 1910)
- February 17 – Šaban Šaulić, singer (b. 1951)
- May 24 - Dušica Žegarac, actress (b. 1944)

== See also ==
- 2019 European Parliament election
