= 2016 in Serbia =

- Decades: 1990s; 2000s; 2010s; 2020s
- See also: Other events of 2016; List of years in Serbia

The following lists events that happened during 2016 in Serbia.

== Incumbents ==
- President: Tomislav Nikolić
- Prime Minister: Aleksandar Vučić

== Events ==
- April 24 - Serbian parliamentary election, 2016
- August 5 – 21 - 103 athletes from Serbia will compete at the 2016 Summer Olympics in Rio de Janeiro, Brazil.
