= 2018 in Serbia =

- Decades: 1990s; 2000s; 2010s; 2020s
- See also: Other events of 2018; List of years in Serbia

The following events occurred in Serbia in the year 2018.

== Incumbents ==
- President: Aleksandar Vučić
- Prime Minister: Ana Brnabić

== Events ==
- 4 March – scheduled time for the Belgrade City Assembly election, 2018

== Deaths ==
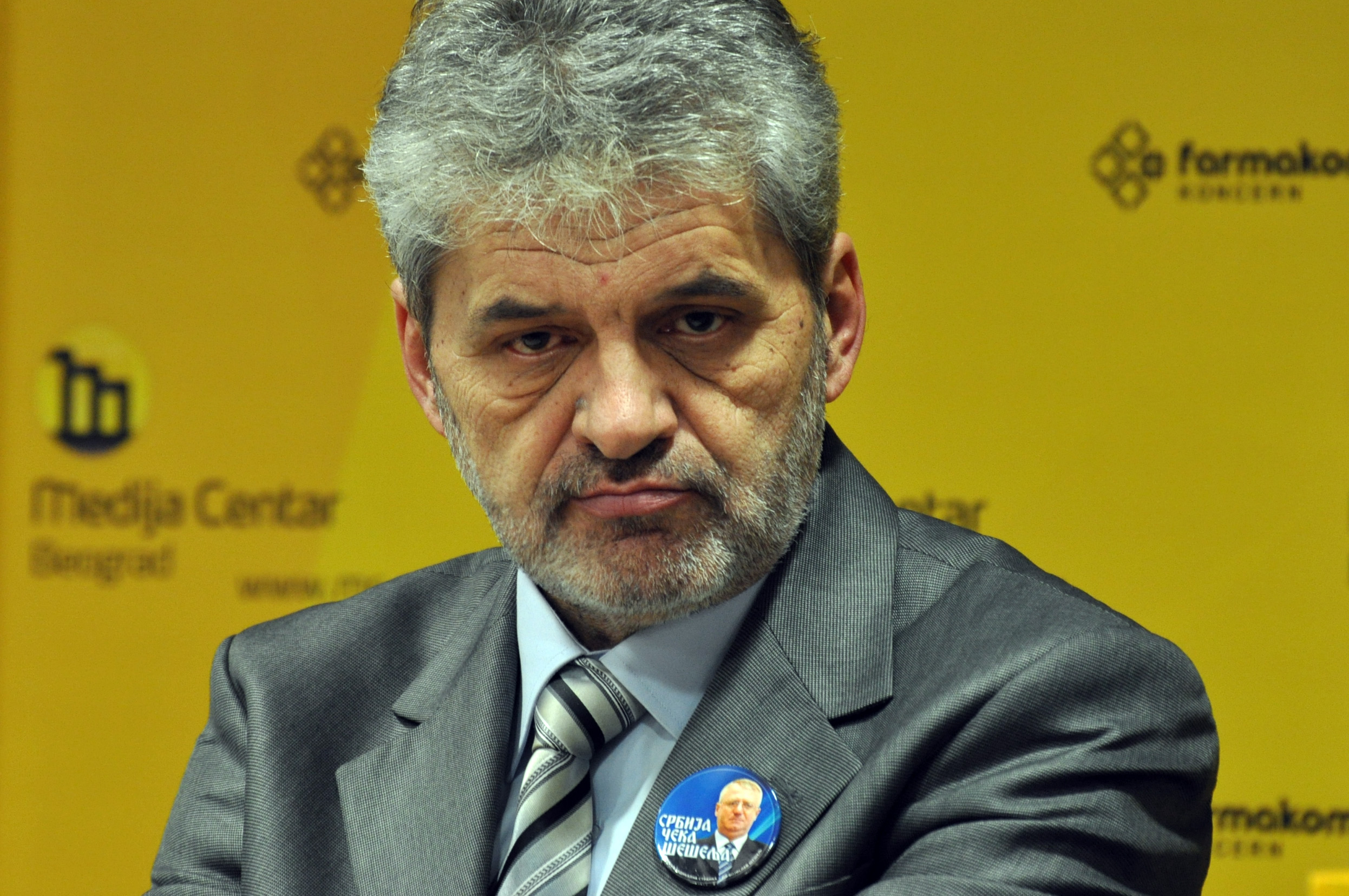
Zoran Krasić

- 1 January – Dušan Mitošević, footballer (b. 1949).
- 12 April – Zoran Krasić, politician (b. 1956)
