= Gyula Gobby Fehér =

Serbian writer (1943–2026)

Gyula Gobby Fehér (11 April 1943 – March 2026) was a Serbian writer.

== Life and career ==
Fehér was born in Bácsfeketehegy on 11 April 1943, to László Fehér and Julianna Vranyó. Between 1974 and 1983 he was deputy editor-in-chief of Novi Sad Television, and between 1983 and 1986 he was its program director.

Between 1986 and 1990, he worked as the Deputy Minister of Culture and Public Education in Vojvodina. Between 1990 and 1994 and from 1995 he was the editor of Novi Sad Television. Between 1993 and 1995 he was the CEO of Forum Lap- és Könyvkiadó.

Throughout his life, Fehér published a number of poetry books and novels.

Fehér died in March 2026, at the age of 82.
