= Bajram Haliti =

Romani scholar (1955–2022)

Bajram Haliti (Serbian Cyrillic: Бајрам Халити; 21 May 1955 – 18 July 2022) was a Romani author from Kosovo. His books have won many awards, including several prizes in the annual "Amico Rom" contest in Italy and his work was included in 1998's The Roads of Roma: A PEN Anthology of Gypsy Writers. A polyglot who has lectured throughout Europe and the United States, he served, as the editor of the magazine Ahimsa ("Nonviolence"), devoted to Romani and Serbian issues.
