= Conscription in Serbia =

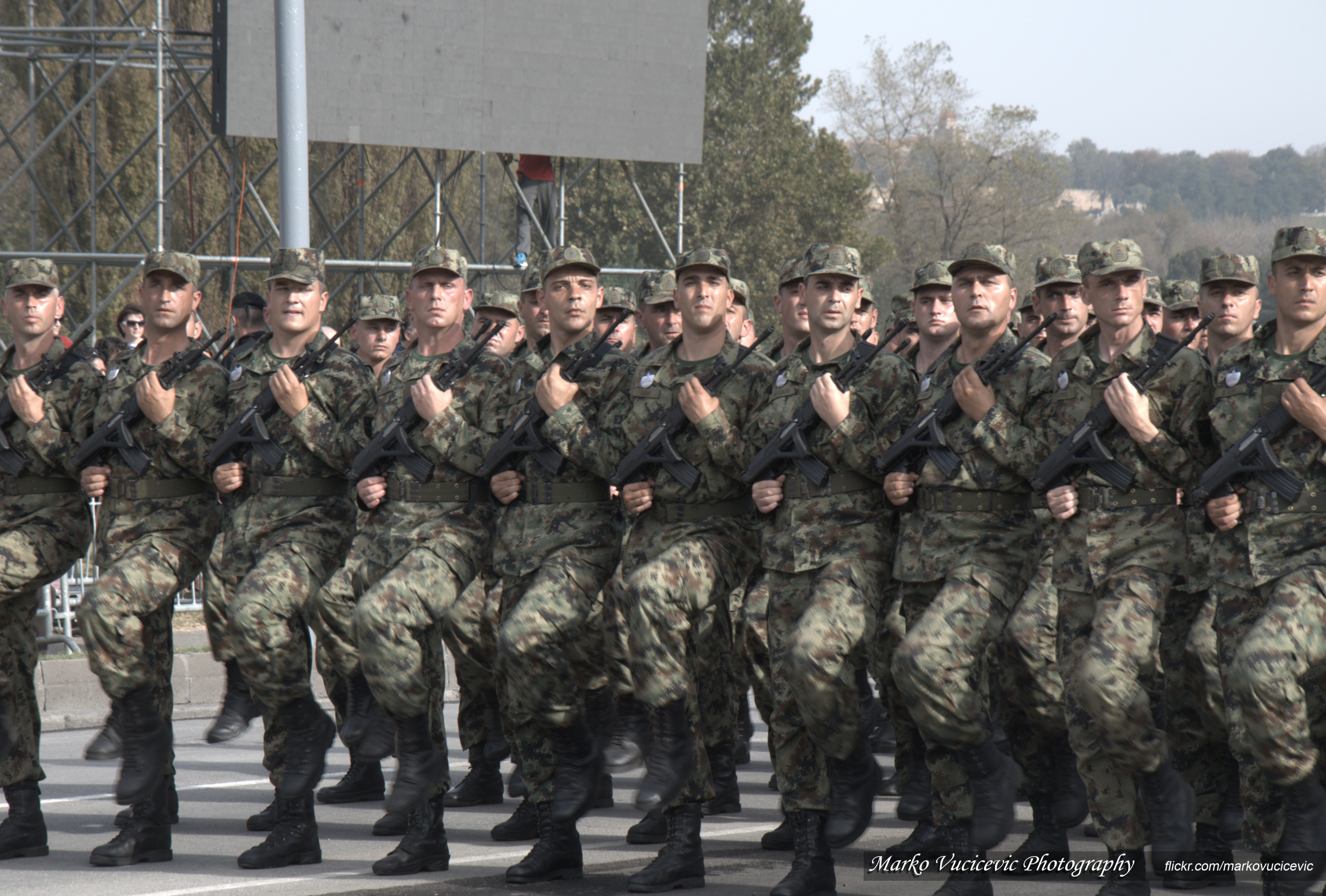
Serbian Soldiers parade marching, 2014

As of 1 January 2011, Serbia no longer practices mandatory military service. Prior to this, mandatory military service lasted 6 months for men. Conscientious objectors could however opt for 9 months of civil service instead. Conscription was set to be reintroduced in early 2026. Later on 29 January 2026, Serbian President Aleksandar Vučić announced that conscription would be reintroduced sometime between December 2026 and March 2027 and that registration for conscription would begin in September 2026 or October 2026.

== History ==
On 15 December 2010, the National Assembly voted to suspend mandatory military service. The decision fully came into force on 1 January 2011.

From 10–17 December 2016, sociologist Srećko Mihailović conducted a nationwide survey with a sample size of 1,200 adults on whether Serbia should return conscription, with the results being that 75% of respondents supported a return of conscription in Serbia. A 2018 poll found support for conscription at 74%, while a 2021 poll found support at 75%.

In August 2018, Serbian President Aleksandar Vučić said the country was considering the idea of reintroducing conscription from 2020, to help improve the combat readiness of the Serbian Army.

On 4 January 2024, the Serbian General Staff proposed reintroduction of conscription to President Vučić. On 13 September 2024, Vučić said that he had approved of the proposal.

In 2024, the Serbian Ministry of Defence publicly disclosed the details of the conscription plan which included:

- Conscripts being males aged 19 to 27 years old
- Conscripts will serve for 75 days
- Older conscripts will have a shorter service period
- Conscientious objectors have the option to serve in a "Civilian Army" for a service period of 155 days
- 20,000 men will be drafted per year
- The first group of draftees will be men who were born in 2006

It was also reported in 2024 that members of the Serbian diaspora who live abroad will also have to serve in the Armed Forces unless they live in a country which already has active conscription.

In late November 2025, the Serbian government announced plans to spend €90 Million between 2026 and 2028 in order to reinstate mandatory military service, with the first conscripts expected to enter service in January 2026 or March 2026. The cited reason for reintroducing conscription was rising tensions in the Balkans, Croatia being set to reintroduce conscription in January 2026, and the military alliance between Croatia, Albania, and Kosovo.

== Politics ==
Boško Obradović, leader of Dveri, supports bringing back conscription in Serbia.

Milan Stamatović, head of the Sovereignists, stated his support for the introduction of mandatory conscription into the army.

== See also ==
- Serbian Armed Forces
