= Konjuh (Kruševac) =

- Village
- Location within Serbia
- Coordinates: 43°38′23″N 21°10′31″E
- Country: Serbia
- District: Rasina District
- Municipality: Kruševac

Population (2022)
  - Total: 888
- Time zone: UTC+1 (CET)
  - Summer (DST): UTC+2 (CEST)

Konjuh is a village in the municipality of Kruševac, Serbia. According to the 2022 census, the village has a population of 888 people.
