= 2006 in Serbia =

- Decades: 1980s; 1990s; 2000s; 2010s; 2020s
- See also: Other events of 2006; List of years in Serbia

== Incumbents ==
- President: Boris Tadić
- Prime Minister: Vojislav Koštunica

== Events ==
- 5 June – Serbia becomes an independent country for the first time since 1918, following the dissolution of Serbia and Montenegro after Montenegro's secession from the country a couple of days earlier.
