= Jovanka Nikolić =

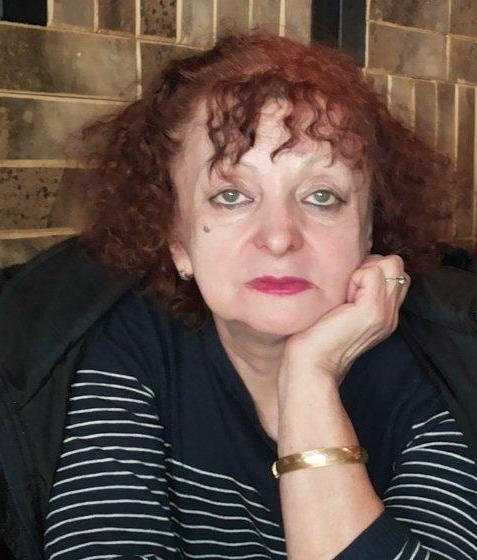
- Author, 2015.
- Born: 16 December 1952; Novi Sad, FPR Yugoslavia (now Serbia)
- Died: 8 January 2017 (aged 64); Novi Sad, Serbia
- Occupation: Writer
- Spouse(s): Jovan Zivlak (1947), writer

Jovanka Nikolić (16 December 1952 – 8 January 2017) was a Serbian author of prose, poetry and poetry for children.

She graduated from the College of Education (Physical Education) at the University of Novi Sad and the Faculty of Dramatic Arts in Belgrade (Organization of stage, cultural and artistic activities). She worked in the sport organization sector and was, for a long time, involved in designing sports choreography for public ceremonies at major sports and social events.

She wrote poetry, prose and children's books. About her prose, the form of expression to which she is most dedicated, V. Gvozden has written: "… Objects of a given reality are destroyed to create a self-standing picture, marked by the problems of identity, love and self-love, helplessness, loneliness, attachment - categories that are prone, if observed in this way, to various distortions and ironic twists."

Jovanka Nikolic lived and worked in Novi Sad. She died on 8 January 2017 at the age of 64.

== Bibliography ==
Jovanka Nikolic published the following books:

- "Flutter" (poems), Matica Serbian, Novi Sad 1980;
- "On many a thing" (poems for children), Draganic, Belgrade 1999;
- "Menu" (short stories), KOV, Vrsac 1985;
- "From Dusk Till Dawn" (short stories), KOV, Vrsac 1994;
- "Certain Periods in a Hundred Fragments" (novel), RAD, Belgrade 1997;
- "I loved you so" (the book of prose) Draganic, Belgrade 1999;
- "Tales of Olden Days" (novel), Svetovi, Novi Sad 2006.
