= 2024 in Serbia =

- Decades: 2000s; 2010s; 2020s
- See also: Other events of 2024; List of years in Serbia

Events in the year 2024 in Serbia.

== Incumbents ==
- President: Aleksandar Vučić
- Prime Minister: Ana Brnabić (until 20 March); Ivica Dačić (20 March to 2 May); Miloš Vučević (since 2 May)
- President of the National Assembly: Vladimir Orlić (until 20 March); Ana Brnabić (since 20 March)

== Events ==
=== January ===
- 14–20 January – 2024 IIHF U20 World Championship Division II B in Belgrade.

=== March ===
- 3 March – 2024 Belgrade City Assembly election: A rerun of the 2023 Belgrade election is held following protests against alleged irregularities.
- 30 March – 2024 World Athletics Cross Country Championships in Belgrade.

=== April ===
- 21 April – A Mark 84 bomb dropped by NATO forces during its bombing campaign in 1999 is discovered at a construction site in Niš, causing the evacuation of 1,300 people from surrounding areas.

=== May ===
- 13 May – Ukrainian Foreign Minister Dmytro Kuleba and First Lady Olena Zelenska make a surprise visit to Belgrade and meet with President Vučić and Prime Minister Vučević.
- 21 May:
  - Following Georgia's model, Serbia's National Assembly passes a bill on "foreign agents".
  - One person is killed in Sombor following a storm that causes damage across the country and cuts electricity in Novi Pazar.

=== June ===
- 2 June – 2024 Serbian local elections.
- 20 June – The Football Association of Serbia threatens to withdraw from UEFA Euro 2024 if UEFA does not punish Croatia and Albania after their supporters chant "kill, kill, kill the Serb".
- 29 June – A police officer is injured after being attacked by a man armed with a crossbow outside the Israeli embassy in Belgrade. The assailant is fatally shot by the same officer.

=== July ===
- 16 July – The government allows the resumption of operations at the Loznica lithium mine operated by Rio Tinto following a decision by the Constitutional Court to overturn the cancellation of the mine's operating permit in 2022.
- 18 July – A police officer is killed and another is injured after they are shot while on patrol in Loznica by an assailant identified as coming from Kosovo. The attacker is later killed during a manhunt.
- 19 July – The European Union and Serbia sign a deal to develop the Loznica lithium mine and production chains for batteries for electric vehicles.
- 26 July – A van carrying migrants overturns near Pirot, injuring 30 passengers.
- 29 July – Thousands of environmentalists and opposition members protest nationwide against an agreement between the European Union and the Serbian government to restart the Loznica lithium mine due to concerns over pollution and deforestation.
- 31 July – A van carrying migrants overturns near Bela Palanka, injuring 20 passengers.

=== August ===
- 22 August – At least 11 people are killed after a boat carrying migrants capsizes in the Drina River near Ljubovija, along the border with Bosnia-Herzegovina.
- 23 August – Six people, including four children, are killed in a fire at a house in Novi Sad.
- 29 August – Serbia and French aerospace manufacturer Dassault Aviation sign an agreement for the purchase of 12 Dassault Rafale warplanes.

=== September ===
- 6 September – Kosovar authorities close the Brnjak and Merdare border crossings with Serbia following a blockade by protesters on the latter side of the border.
- 11 September – An appeals court in Belgrade orders a retrial for Andrei Hniot, a Belarusian dissident whose extradition had been sought by authorities in his home country for alleged tax evasion. He is released on 31 October and leaves for Germany.
- 14 September – President Vučić announces the reintroduction of compulsory military service, which was abolished in 2011.

=== October ===
- 6 October – Ladislav Nemet, the Archbishop of Belgrade, is named a cardinal by Pope Francis, with his elevation to the College of Cardinals scheduled on 8 December. He is the first person from Serbia to receive the title.
- 7 October – Kosovo announces the resumption of imports at border crossings with Serbia after they had been halted in June 2023 due to security issues.

=== November ===
- 1 November – Sixteen people are killed and one person is injured in the collapse of a canopy of the Novi Sad railway station.
- 3 November – Protesters gather in Belgrade, calling for punishment of officials deemed responsible for the Novi Sad railway station canopy collapse.
- 4 November – Construction minister Goran Vesić announces his resignation amid criticism over the Novi Sad railway station canopy collapse.
- 5 November – Ongoing protests relating to the Novi Sad canopy collapse escalate into riots as protesters surround the Novi Sad City Hall, throwing red paint, rocks and other items at the building. Police respond with tear gas. Opposition politician Bojan Pajtić claims that the escalation was stoked by government-aligned provocateurs.

=== December ===
- 12 December – Uroš Blažić is convicted for perpetrating the Mladenovac and Smederevo shootings in 2023 that killed nine people and is sentenced to 20 years' imprisonment.
- 30 December – The parents of the 13-year old perpetrator of the Belgrade school shooting in 2023 are convicted along with a gun instructor for failing to secure the firearm used in the incident, with the father sentenced to 14.5 years' imprisonment.

== Deaths ==
- 26 March – Slađana Milošević, 68, singer-songwriter.

== Holidays ==
- 1 January – New Year's Day
- 7 January – Christmas Day
- 27 January – Saint Sava
- 15–16 February – National Day
- 22 April – National Holocaust, World War II Genocide and other Fascist Crimes Victims Remembrance Day
- 1 May – Labour Day
- 3 May – Orthodox Good Friday
- 6 May – Orthodox Easter
- 9 May – Victory Day
- 28 June – Saint Vitus
- 15 September – Serbian Unity Day
- 21 October – World War II Serbian Victims Remembrance Day
- 11 November – Armistice Day
