= Milomir Kovac =

Serbian-German veterinary surgeon (1962–2022)

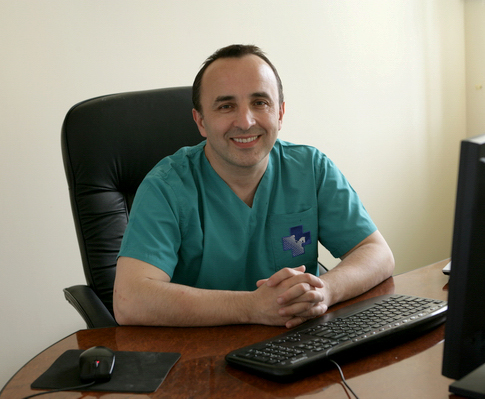
- Born: 21 October 1962; Foča, PR Bosnia and Herzegovina, FPR Yugoslavia
- Died: 24 October 2022 (aged 60)
- Education: University of Sarajevo; Veterinary clinic - Hochmor (Germany), Doctor of Sciences (1993)
- Awards: Gold medal of the University in Sarajevo, as the academically best among the graduating students - 1987; Professor "honoris causa at the Moscow State Academy of Veterinary Medicine and Biotechnology - 2013; Golden scalpel - most prestigious award of the Russian Veterinary Association - 2014.
- Scientific career
- Fields: Veterinary Medicine
- Workplaces: Veterinary Clinic "New Century; Moscow State Academy of Veterinary Medicine and Biotechnology

Milomir Kovac (Serbian Cyrillic: Миломир Ковач/Milomir Kovač, 21 October 1962 – 24 October 2022) was a Serbian-German veterinary surgeon, equine specialist, columnist, and author of university textbooks.

== Biography ==
From 2007, Kovac worked as the Lecturer for "Equine Biology and Pathology" of the Moscow State Academy of Veterinary Medicine and Biotechnology and as a columnist for the Russian magazine "Horse World”.

Kovac was latterly the head of the veterinary clinic "New Century" (Moscow), a member of the Serbian Royal Academy of Innovative Science and the chief instructor of Russian nationwide intensive course for veterinarians specialization: "Equine Medicine and Surgery".

In October 2013, Kovac was awarded at the Moscow State Academy of Veterinary Medicine and Biotechnology, the title of professor "honoris causa" for outstanding achievements in the field of equine medicine in the Russian Federation.

In April 2014, Kovac received the most prestigious award in veterinary medicine of the Russian Federation "Golden scalpel" in the nomination "For the introduction of innovative technologies in the veterinary medicine".

In 2017, Kovac, together with the Federal University of Kazan and the University of Nottingham (Great Britain), was the first in the world to successfully apply the gene therapy technology in the treatment of severe damage of equine tendon and ligaments.

From 2007, Kovac was the only full-time available equine surgeon specialist in the Russian Federation. He started the first implementation equine colic surgery in Russia. In the course of ten years, 300 such operations were performed, with the percentage of survival rate of over 82%. Prior to 2007, all horses with intestinal strangulation died in the Russian Federation, because nobody could perform the colic surgery. In addition, Kovac was the first in the Russian Federation, to perform laparoscopic surgery for equine cryptorchidism, and cryosurgery to remove abdominal and skin tumors. He was the first to use the mesenchymal stem cells and platelet-rich plasma for the treatment of equine tendon and ligament injury.

In cooperation with Joseph Toth, he first performed a pars plana vitrectomy of horses with equine recurrent uveitis, as well as first performed an evisceration with insertion of an intrascleral prosthesis of horses in the Russian Federation. .

Kovac wrote several books of the equine medicine and surgery and is also author of over 100 scientific papers. His monographs "Colic disease of horse" and "Equine Orthopedic Diseases - Modern methods of diagnosis and treatment" are the first published university textbooks, in these fields of equine medicine in the Russian-speaking world. As the university textbooks, these books have been approved by Ministry of Education and Science of the Russian Federation.

Kovac died on 24 October 2022, at the age of 60.
