= 2000 in Yugoslavia =

- Decades
- See also: Other events of 2000

The following lists events that happened during 2000 in the Federal Republic of Yugoslavia.

== Incumbents ==
- President: Slobodan Milošević (until October 7), Vojislav Koštunica (starting October 7)
- Prime Minister: Momir Bulatović (until November 4), Zoran Žižić (starting November 4)

== Events ==
=== January ===
- January 15 – Assassination of Željko Ražnatović, Serbian mobster and paramilitary leader.
- January 16 – Opposition parties demand the resignation of the President Slobodan Milošević.

=== September ===
- September 24 – Vojislav Koštunica wins the presidential election, but the incumbent Slobodan Milošević refuses to recognise the result.
- September 29 – October 5: Overthrow of Slobodan Milošević

=== October ===
- October 5 – President Slobodan Milošević leaves office after widespread demonstrations throughout Serbia and the withdrawal of Russian support.
- October 6 – Vojislav Koštunica succeeds Slobodan Milošević as president.

=== November ===
- November 12 – The United States recognizes the Federal Republic of Yugoslavia.

=== December ===
- December 23 – Serbian parliamentary election.

== Births ==
- 24 May – Anja Crevar, swimmer

== Deaths ==
- January 15 – Željko Ražnatović, war criminal and paramilitary leader (born 1952)
- February 7 – Pavle Bulatović, politician (born 1948)
- March 12 – Aleksandar Nikolić, basketball player (born 1918)
- May 13 – Boško Perošević, politician (born 1956)
- July 12 – Prince Tomislav of Yugoslavia (born 1928)
- August 25 – Ivan Stambolić, President of Serbia (born 1936)
- August 29 – Marko Todorović, actor (born 1929)
- December 24 – Helena Pajović, figure skater (born 1979)
- Milić od Mačve, painter (born 1934)
