= Danica Mastilović =

- Даница Мастиловић
- Born: 7 November 1933; Negotin, Serbia, Yugoslavia
- Died: 15 July 2023 (aged 89); Dreieich, Hesse, Germany
- Other name: Daniza Mastilović
- Occupation: Opera singer
- Years active: 1955–1999

Danica Mastilović (Serbian: Даница Мастиловић; 7 November 1933 – 15 July 2023) was a Serbian-German opera dramatic soprano. She joined the Oper Frankfurt in 1959 and made her formal operatic debut in Giacomo Puccini's Tosca at the Frankfurt am Main Opera that same year. Mastilović became recognised for her roles in the operas of Richard Strauss, Giuseppe Verdi and Richard Wagner. She retired at the end of the 1998–99 operatic season.

== Biography ==
Mastilović was born on 7 November 1933 in Negotin, Eastern Serbia, Yugoslavia. She was the daughter of Luka Mastilovic and Ljubica Pajkic. Mastilović received vocal training from Nikola Cvejić at the Belgrade Conservatory. While she was a student, Mastilović sang operetta with the Belgrade Operetta Theater between 1955 and 1959. In 1959, at the invitation of the Oper Frankfurt musical director and conductor Georg Solti, she joined Oper Frankurt as a singer; she was accepted to become an ensemble on a three-year contract under Intendant Harry Buckwitz, even though she did not know German or hold a university degree. Mastilović made her formal operatic debut in Giacomo Puccini's Tosca at the Frankfurt am Main Opera on 18 June of that year, and became principally recognised for her roles in the operas of Richard Strauss, Giuseppe Verdi and Richard Wagner. She had been performing in smaller roles before graduating to more prominent roles; Mastilović learned new roles under the Austrian coach Hans Hasel.

In 1960, she made her first guest appearance with the Vienna State Opera as Tosca. She had her American debut as Abigaille in Verdi's Nabucco at the Lyric Opera of Chicago, and in 1964, Mastilović received an invitation to perform with the Hamburg State Opera, performing the titular role in Puccini's Turandot. Between 1965 and 1967, she sang the role of Gerhilde in Wagner's Die Walküre at the Bayreuth Festival, and was a guest with both the Teatro dell'Opera di Roma from 1968 to 1975 and the Gran Teatre del Liceu between 1975 and 1980 as the titular character in Strauss's Elektra, a role she performed at the Royal Opera House in Covent Garden, London between 1973 and 1975, as well as at La Scala in Milan, at the Paris Opera, and the Royal Swedish Opera in Stockholm. Mastilović transitioned to dramatic soprano repertoire under the opera director Christoph von Dohnányi. She made her debut with the Metropolitan Opera in New York City, performing Elektra on 25 November 1975. She had performed as a concert soloist in New York beforehand.

In 1979, Mastilović she sang Turandot at the Opéra de Monte-Carlo and The Dyer's Wife in Strauss's Die Frau ohne Schatten in 1980. Three years later, she was made Kammersängerin (chamber singer) at Oper Frankfurt, performing a number of character roles that she began to focus more on. These included Larina in Eugene Onegin, Berta in The Barber of Seville, and Czipra in The Gypsy Baron. Mastilović left the Oper Frankfurt in 1984, but continued to perform there as a guest artist. Three years later, she took on the part of Clytemnestra in Strauss's Elektra for the first time at the Salzburger Landestheater, and performed the role in Salzburg for multiple seasons. Mastilović sang the role of the Old Countess in Pyotr Ilyich Tchaikovsky's The Queen of Spades at the Trier City Theatre and appeared at the Oper Frankfurt as the Old Buryja in Leoš Janáček's Jenůfa under Michael Gielen in 1995.

Other roles Mastilović performed were Wagner’s Ortrud in Lohengrin, Senta in Der fliegende Holländer, Kundry in Parsifal, Isolde in Tristan und Isolde, Brünnhilde in Der Ring des Nibelungen, Leonore in Ludwig van Beethoven's Fidelio, Elisabetta in Verdi's Don Carlos, Desdemona in Otello, Amelia in Simon Boccanegra, Leonora in Il trovatore and as Marina in Modest Mussorgsky's Boris Godunov. She appeared as Puccini's Turandot at 28 opera houses across the globe, and sang Elektra more than 200 times. Three records of her performances were made available to the public. Mastilović's operatic career ended in the role of the Amme in Tchaikovsky’s Eugene Onegin during the conclusion to the 1998–99 opera season.

== Personal life ==
Mastilović was a naturalised German citizen, and was married to Klaus Scholl. Mastilović was a recipient of the First Opera Prize, City of Frankfurt. Following a long and serious illness, she died in Dreieich, Hesse, near Frankfurt on 15 July 2023.
