= 2025 in Serbia =

- Decades: 2000s; 2010s; 2020s
- See also: Other events of 2025; List of years in Serbia

Events in the year 2025 in Serbia.

== Incumbents ==
- President: Aleksandar Vučić
- Prime Minister: Miloš Vučević (until 16 April); Đuro Macut (since 16 April)
- President of the National Assembly: Ana Brnabić

== Events ==
Ongoing: 2024–present Serbian anti-corruption protests

=== January ===
- 20 January – Eight people are killed in a fire at a nursing home in Barajevo.
- 28 January – Miloš Vučević resigns as prime minister amid mass protests regarding the Novi Sad railway station canopy collapse and after several incidents where members of the Serbian Progressive Party attacked students in Novi Sad.

=== February ===
- 24 February – Serbia votes in favour of a United Nations General Assembly resolution calling Russia an aggressor state over its invasion of Ukraine. President Vučić calls the decision an accident and apologizes.
- 24–28 February – Pesma za Evroviziju '25 was held, with Princ winning with this song Mila.

=== March ===
- 4 March – A brawl breaks out in the National Assembly after opposition parties demand the confirmation of the resignation of Prime Minister Vučević and his government during a debate on a bill to increase funding for university education. Three MPs are injured.
- 8–17 March – 2025 IBA Women's World Boxing Championships in Niš.
- 11 March – Hundreds of students form a blockade around the headquarters of the Radio Television of Serbia in Belgrade, accusing the state television station of being biased towards President Aleksandar Vučić. At least one police officer is injured in clashes with students.
- 15 March
  - Hundreds of thousands of people attend the largest-ever protest held in Serbia.
  - 2025 Belgrade stampede

=== April ===
- 16 April – Đuro Macut is elected prime minister by the National Assembly.

=== September ===
- 3 September – FIFA issues a CHF50,000 ($62,000)-fine on the Football Association of Serbia over inappropriate behavior by fans during a 2026 FIFA World Cup qualification match between the national team and Andorra in June.
- 26 September – Two people are arrested on suspicion of running a training camp aimed at destabilizing the 2025 Moldovan parliamentary election.

=== October ===
- 3 October – Water and communications outages occur in the towns of Medveđa and Crna Trava following an autumn snowstorm.
- 5 October – A boat carrying migrants from China capsizes along the Danube River near Bačka Palanka while trying to cross into Croatia, killing one passenger.
- 9 October – Sanctions imposed by the United States against Naftna Industrija Srbije over its majority-Russian ownership come into effect.
- 22 October – One person is injured in a fire and shooting at a camp of supporters of President Vučić outside the National Assembly in Belgrade.

=== November ===
- 7 November – The National Assembly votes 130-40 to pass a law allowing for the redevelopment of the General Staff Building in Belgrade, which was bombed-out during the NATO bombing of Yugoslavia in 1999, into a luxury compound with the help of a firm owned by US president Donald Trump's son-in-law Jared Kushner.
- 11 November – Thousands of people protest in Belgrade against the proposed re-development of the former General Staff Building, which was delisted as a cultural asset in 2024.

=== December ===
- 24 December – The Novi Sad High Court drops charges against former construction minister Goran Vesić over his involvement in the 2024 Novi Sad railway station canopy collapse, citing insufficient evidence.

== Holidays ==
- 1 January – New Year's Day
- 7 January – Christmas Day
- 27 January – Saint Sava
- 15–16 February – National Day
- 18 April – Orthodox Good Friday
- 21 April – Orthodox Easter
- 22 April – National Holocaust, World War II Genocide and other Fascist Crimes Victims Remembrance Day
- 1 May – Labour Day
- 9 May – Victory Day
- 28 June – Saint Vitus
- 15 September – Serbian Unity Day
- 21 October – World War II Serbian Victims Remembrance Day
- 11 November – Armistice Day

== Deaths ==
=== January ===
- 4 January – Ana Gligić, 90, virologist.

=== October ===
- 20 October – Nebojša Pavković, 79, convicted war criminal, chief of the General Staff of Yugoslavia (2000–2002).
