= Goran Kovačević =

Serbian politician (1970–2022)

Goran Kovačević (Serbian Cyrillic: Горан Ковачевић; 1970 – 12 November 2022) was a Serbian politician. He served in the National Assembly of Serbia from 2014 to 2022 as a member of the Serbian Progressive Party.

== Early life and career ==
Kovačević was an economist who lived in Kragujevac. He was an advisor for the economic centre ED "Centar".

== Politician ==
=== Municipal politics ===
Kovačević appeared in the thirty-second position on the electoral list of the far-right Serbian Radical Party in Kragujevac in the 2004 Serbian local elections. The list won thirteen mandates, and he was not initially included in the party's assembly delegation. (From 2000 to 2011, mandates in Serbian elections were awarded to sponsoring parties or coalitions rather than individual candidates, and it was common practice for the mandates to be assigned out of numerical order. Kovačević's list position had no bearing on whether he would be elected.) He was awarded a mandate on 28 April 2005 as the replacement for another party member. He was subsequently given the fifteenth position on the Radical Party's list in the 2008 local elections and was elected to a second term when the list won eighteen mandates. The party served in opposition throughout this period.

The Radical Party experienced a serious split in late 2008, with several party members joining the more moderate Progressive Party under the leadership of Tomislav Nikolić and Aleksandar Vučić. Kovačević sided with the Progressives.

Serbia's electoral system was reformed in 2011, such that mandates were awarded in numerical order to candidates on successful lists. Kovačević received the eighth position on the Progressive Party's list for Kragujevac in the 2012 local elections and was re-elected when the list won eighteen mandates, finishing second against a local coalition led by Veroljub Stevanović. Following a shift in local alliances, the Progressives formed a local coalition government in 2014.

The Serbian Progressive Party in Kragujevac was for many years divided between supporters of Nikolić and Vučić; Kovačević was identified in a 2017 article as a prominent local ally of Vučić. He was given the second position on the Progressive lists in both 2016 and 2020 and was re-elected both times when the list won majority victories.

=== Parliamentarian ===
Kovačević received the 103rd position on the Progressive Party's Let's Get Serbia Moving list in the 2012 Serbian parliamentary election. The list won seventy-three mandates, and he was not elected. He was promoted to the forty-sixth position for the 2014 and was elected to his first term when Progressive-led alliance won a landslide victory with 158 out of 250 mandates. He received the 125th position in 2016 and was re-elected when the list won 131 mandates.

During the 2016–20 parliament, Kovačević was a member of the parliamentary committee on finance, state budget, and control of public spending; a deputy member of the committee on spatial planning, transport, infrastructure, and telecommunications; a member of Serbia's delegation to the Parliamentary Dimension of the Central European Initiative; the head of Serbia's parliamentary friendship group with Australia; and a member of the parliamentary friendship groups with Austria, Belarus, Bolivia, China, Germany, Indonesia, the Netherlands, Russia, Slovenia, Switzerland, and the United States of America.

Kovačević received the sixty-ninth position on the Progressive Party's Aleksandar Vučić — For Our Children electoral list in the 2020 parliamentary election and was elected to a third term when the list won a landslide victory with 188 mandates. He was a member of the finance committee and the leader of Serbia's parliamentary group with Australia, and was a deputy member of the agriculture, forestry, and water management committee, and a member of the subcommittee for the consideration of reports on audits conducted by the state audit institution.
