= Svetozar Saša Kovačević =

Serbian composer and organist (1950–2022)

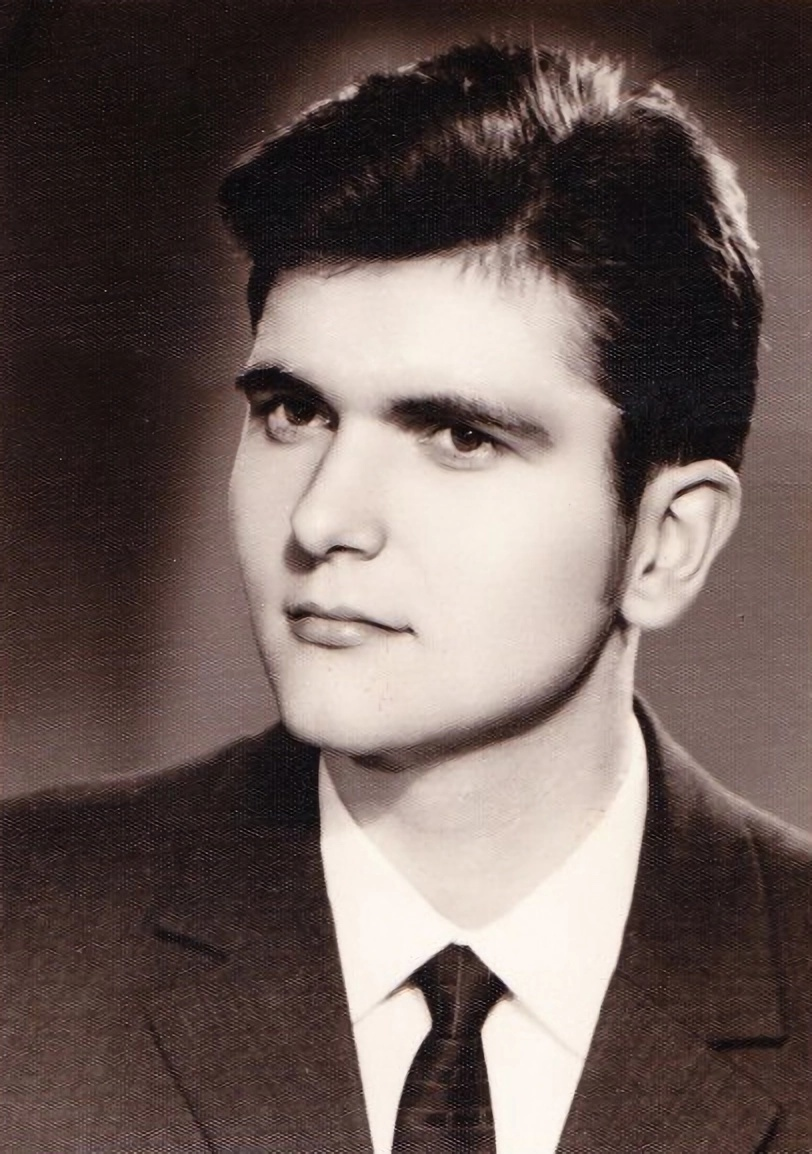
- Svetozar Saša Kovačević in 1968

Background information
- Birth name: Svetozar Saša Kovačević
- Born: January 3, 1950. Žabalj, Vojvodina, SFR Yugoslavia
- Died: September 18, 2022 (aged 72)
- Occupation(s): Composer, Music pedagogue, Church organist

Svetozar Saša Kovačević (Serbian Cyrillic: Светозар Саша Ковачевић; 3 January 1950 – 18 September 2022) was a Serbian composer, music pedagogue and church organist. He was one of Serbia's best-known contemporary composers.

== Biography ==
Svetozar Saša Kovačević was born in Zabalj and studied music at the Isidor Bajić Music School in Novi Sad. He studied composition with Victor Safranek, Nikola Petina, Rudolf Bruchi and Vasilij Mokranjac. During his studies, he began performing as a pianist, deciding at the same time to practise organ music as a soloist or a member of ensembles performing works of spiritual music in the territory of ex-Yugoslavia. He attended seminars for organ building and trimming in Grožnjan (Croatia) in 1973 with prof. Patrick Colon (Belgium) and at the Chamber Music Seminar in Amsterdam and Utrecht at the invitation of the Dutch Government in 1974.

Kovačević taught accordion at the Davorin Jenko music school in Belgrade. He was the accompanist of the opera and ballet of the Serbian National Theater in Novi Sad and at the Department of Dramatic Art of the Academy of Arts in Novi Sad for the subject: Voice Technique. At the Isidor Bajic High School of Music in Novi Sad, he taught the subject of Corrections and Reading from a List (prima vista) on the piano section. In the period 1990-2010 he was the organist and cantor of the Reformed Christian Church in Novi Sad and Sombor. He initiated the opening of the Sombor High School of Music in 2008. After retiring from all professions he retired as a full professor at the Academy of Arts in Novi Sad, Department of Musical Arts, Departments of Composition and Musicology for the subject: Playing and reading orchestral scores. Since 2005 was listed as International Composer by the IBC (International Biographical Center) in Cambridge (England) in 2010. The IBC awarded him a Diploma and a silver medal for his achievements in the field of ecumenical music and he was also chosen by the publication of 2000 foreign intellectuals for the 21st century. (2000 outstanding intellectuals of the 21st century) At the University of Maribor (Slovenia), on the occasion of 30 years of this highest educational institution, as a representative of Serbia, he presented his paper on ecumenism in music with a reference to the author's work "MissaOecumenica" at the international symposium "Religion and European Integration ”under the auspices of the European Union, the European Academy of Sciences and Arts of Salzburg and the Danube Rectorial Commission. The composer's oeuvre includes over 300 compositions of spiritual music, solo songs, instrumental and stage music, chamber and symphonic music. He is an expert consultant on the book on Organ in Vojvodina by Đerđ Mandić in the joint edition of Agape doo Novi Sad and the Institute for Culture of Vojvodina in 2005. He is a Researcher of the Music Lexicon Serbian / English and English / Serbian in the edition of Linguist in Belgrade 2006.

Membership: Member of the Union of Composers of Serbia, member of the Union of Composers of Vojvodina, founder and chairman of the Board of Directors of the Organum Pannonicum Foundation and founder and member of the Vojvodina Early Music Association.

== Compositions ==
Opus of over 300 compositions which include solo songs, pieces for piano, violin, viola, violoncello, contrabass, flute, oboe, cor anglais, bassoon, alto saxophone, accordion and organ; also orchestral, chamber and scene music, etc.
Some of most important are:

- Concerto for harpsichord and chamber orchestra;
- Concert piece for organ and chamber orchestra;
- Introduction and Grande fuga for ensemble of double bass quartet, Bassiona amorosa, München;
- Fuga for ensemble: Varadinum Quartet, Oradea, Romania;
- Dharma valzer for symphonic orchestra;
- Andante cantabile for viola and chamber string orchestra;
- Reminiscence for violoncello and chamber string orchestra.
- Partita Petrovaradinska for two violins, strings and harpsichord;
- Safikada - Bosnian National Opera (co-author);

Church music:

- Ave Maria for solo soprano, flute and organ;
- Ave Maria for female choir and organ;
- Orthodox Prayer to the Holy Father Vasilije Ostroški for mixed choir a capella;
- Missa Theatrica for female choir and mixed choir a capella;
- Stabat Mater for Flute, Oboe, 8-voice mixed choir and chamber orchestra;
- Hallelujah for flute solo, mixed choir and chamber orchestra;
- Missa Oecumenica in nomine Jesu for soloists, mixed choir, orchestra and organ;

== Recordings end publications ==
CD releases: 1. Through the scents of solitude - the cycle of compositions for Flute and Organ 2000. Author's Edition 2. Petrovaradin Suite - Selection of Author Music 2001. Author's Edition 3. Missa Oecumenica - for soloists, mixed choir, baroque orchestra and continuo, 2003. Author's edition 4. Bajić Strings - 9 original compositions for strings soloists, students of music school in Novi Sad. Isidor Bajic Music School in Novi Sad 2007. 5. In 2010, the Brazilian String Quartet Amizade recorded two of Kovačević's compositions for his CD, which was released under the auspices of the Brazilian Government's Ministry of Culture - the Hungarian-themed Fantasy and the Fugue. 6. Burlesque - composition for two pianos, Ingmar Piano duo in SOKOJ 2013 edition.

Publications:

- our solo songs in the book, Solo Songs From Invasion Concurs for Composers, 2005;
- Recenzent for The Organ Heritage in Vojvodina, 2005;
- Recenzent for Musical Lexicon, English/Serbian, Serbian/English, 2006.

== Honours and memberships ==
Three awards for Suite for Accordion Orchestra, 1973; Award for Patkica Žutkica puppet show, 1995.
Memberships: Association of Composers of Vojvodina;
