= 2001 in the Federal Republic of Yugoslavia =

- Decades
- See also: Other events of 2001

Events from the year 2001 in FR Yugoslavia.

== Incumbents ==
- President: Vojislav Koštunica
- Prime Minister: Zoran Žižić (until 24 July), Dragiša Pešić (starting 24 July)

== Events ==
- 1 April – Arrest in Belgrade of deposed president Slobodan Milošević.
- 28 June – Extradition of Slobodan Milošević to The Hague to stand trial for war crimes.

== Deaths ==
- 23 April – Fadil Hoxha, politician (born 1916)
- 20 October – Nebojša Popović, basketball player (born 1923)
- 29 October – Milorad B. Protić, astronomer (born 1910)
- Nada Mamula, singer (born 1927)
- Aleksandar Obradović, composer (born 1927)
