= Timeline of Serbian history =

This is a timeline of Serbian history, comprising important legal and territorial changes and political events in Serbia and its predecessor states. To read about the background to these events, see History of Serbia. See also the list of Serbian monarchs and list of presidents of Serbia.

== 7th century ==
Year	Date	Event
600		A first major wave of Serbs migrated to Serbia, at the invitation of the Byzantine Emperor Heraclius.

== 8th century ==
Year	Date	Event
780		Višeslav of Serbia, was the first Serbian ruler known by name, who ruled as the Prince of the Serbs in c. 780. The polity is known in historiography as the Serbian Principality. He was a progenitor of the Vlastimirović dynasty.

== 9th century ==
Year	Date	Event
800		Radoslav of Serbia, was a Serbian Prince (Knez, Archont) who ruled over the Serbs from 800 to 822, he succeeded his father Višeslav, who was the first ruler known by name of the early medieval Principality of Serbia. His son Prosigoj succeeded him in ca. 822
822		Ljudevit Posavski, Prince of Pannonian Slavs, becomes a Prince of Serbs in Pagania's city of Srb as the Franks approach the Serbian lands. This Serbo-Croatian defence union expires in 823.
825		In the Principality of Serbia, the House of Višeslavić-Vlastimirović strengthens the state against its immediate neighbors the Frankish Empire, the First Bulgarian Empire and the Byzantine Empire. Vlastimir of Serbia repels Bulgarian attacks led by Khan Boris.
863		Missionaries Sts. Cyrill and Methodius are sent to Serbia on the order of Byzantine emperor Michael the III to fully convert Serbs to Christianity.
900		Višeslav's son, or grandson, ruled during the uprisings of Ljudevit Posavski against the Franks in 819–822. According to the Royal Frankish Annals, in 822, Ljudevit went from his seat in Sisak to the Serbs somewhere in western Balkans – the Serbs are mentioned as reportedly holding the great/large part of Dalmatia ("Sorabos, quae natio magnam Dalmatiae partem obtinere dicitur").
900		The Magyars settle in Slavic Pannonia (Modern-day Hungary) effectively splitting the South Slavs from the West Slavs. Occasional clashes with Byzantine, Bulgarian and Serbian forces in frontier regions.

== 10th century ==
Year	Date	Event
1000		The First Bulgarian Empire annexes inner regions of the Principality of Serbia (924–927)
1000		Prince Časlav Klonimirović-Vlastimirović liberates inner Serbia from the Bulgarians in 927 AD and then proceeds towards uniting all Serbian principalities into a single state. He dies in a clash with the Magyars and his realm disintegrates in defensive wars against Croatia, Byzantines, Bulgaria and the Kingdom of Hungary.

== 11th century ==
Year	Date	Event
1018		Byzantine rule is imposed upon inner Serbia; it becomes a thema (region) directly subjugated to Constantinople. Constantine Diogenes (a Greek) is mentioned as the strategos of Serbia. The rise of the Vojislavljević dynasty in Duklja. Littoral Serbia remains independent and wages wars against the Byzantines and eventually succeeds in freeing the Serb lands.
1034		The Vojislavljević dynasty claims the Serbian throne of Duklja as legal heir of the Vlastimirović dynasty. Under Stefan Vojislav Duklja becomes independent as the First Serbian Realm becoming the new core of the Serbian world.
1054		The East-West Schism splits Christianity in 1054. vast majority of Serbs opt for Orthodox Christianity due to deep Byzantine influences, but many in the coastal lands embrace Catholicism influenced by Venice. The Archbishopric of Bar is established by the Vatican in 1089.
1077		Mihailo I Vojislavljević assumes the title of the King of Duklja in Ston becoming the first internationally recognized Serbian king. His title was Ruler of Tribals and Serbs and ruled most of today's Montenegro and Dalmatia. His son Konstantin Bodin asserts the throne of Second Bulgarian Empire and annexes large parts of Bulgaria to the Serbian realm

== 12th century ==
Year	Date	Event
1101		Raymond IV of Toulouse, leader of the Crusaders, meets with King Bodin in the city of Skadar. The Vukanović family will rule most of the aforementioned territories for decades to come. Tensions will rise among the noble families of inner Serbia, Duklja and its dominions leading to the disintegration of the Realm in the mid-12th century and a Byzantine intrusion.
1113		King Konstantin Bodin's relative Stefan Nemanja is born in Ribnica, Duklja. Exiled by his father's opponents he settles in Ras, in the region of Raška. He is the founder of the most powerful royal house of Medieval Serbia: the Nemanjić dynasty. The dynasty will have a decisive role in shaping and reaffirming the national identity of the Serbs tying it closely to the Byzantine civilizational model.
1176		the Grand Prince Stefan Nemanja sides with Venice, Duchy of Austria and Principality of Hungary undermining Byzantine authority in the Adriatic Sea.
1185		Stefan Nemanja repels the Byzantine forces proclaiming the independence of Serbia which triggers an anti-Byzantine revolt in Bulgaria and Wallacia.
1189		Holy Roman Emperor Friedrich Barbarossa and his 100,000 man army are hosted by Grand Prince Stefan Nemanja in Niš during the Third Crusade. Their alliance would give the Serbian Grand Prince enough time to take parts of Kosovo from the Byzantine Empire.

== 13th century ==
Year	Date	Event
1217		Stefan the First-Crowned is crowned the King of the Serbs by Pope Honorius III establishing the Second Serbian Realm. The full title of his dominions was King of the land of Rascia, Dioclea, Travunia, Dalmatia and Zachlumia. Catholicism expands within the Realm.
1217		King Stefan the First-Crowned's brother, Prince Rastko Nemanjić (Saint Sava), establishes an autocephalous Serbian Orthodox Church with the support of the Patriarch of Constantinople putting an end to religious divisions among Serbs. Stefan Nemanja becomes another patron saint of the Serbian Orthodox Church and is known as Saint Simeon.

== 14th century ==
Year	Date	Event
1316		The Kingdom of Syrmia is annexed by the Medieval Kingdom of Serbia following the death of King Stefan Dragutin of Syrmia. Belgrade is returned to the control of the Kingdom of Hungary. Clashes with the Kingdom of Hungary over northern Serbia results in the division of the former Kingdom of Syrmia with the Kingdom of Hungary gaining all territories north of the Sava and the Danube and a region of Belgrade.
1342		King Stefan Dušan conquers most of European Byzantium launching his first Siege of Constantinople. The Second Serbian Kingdom becomes the largest state in Southern and Eastern Europe.
1355		Czar Stefan Dušan The Great dies of poisoning following clashes with Hungarians and invading Turks. Stefan Uroš V of Serbia assumes the throne of the Serbian Empire triggering dynastic clashes among Serbian nobility. Simeon Uroš declares himself Emperor in Thessaly, Balšići took over Montenegro, Mrnjavčevići Macedonia, Lazarevići – Moravian Serbia, Brankovići – Kosovo, etc.
1371		The Ottoman Turks break into Europe and the Serbian domain of Macedonia clashing with the Christian League led by Vukašin Mrnjavčević in the Battle of Maritsa in the region of Thrace. This was a decisive Ottoman victory.
1386		The Serbian army led by Prince Lazar defeats the Ottomans in the Battle of Plocnik.
1388		The Serbian army defeats the Ottomans in the Battle of Bileca. From this the Ottomans learned how to fight against heavy cavalry. This became valuable experience for the next battle, the Battle of Kosovo.
1389		According to myth Miloš Obilić establishes the Order of the Dragon of St George, an alliance of Serb aristocracy against the Ottoman invaders. Out of 12 knights only 1 survives the battle passing his credentials to Stefan Lazarević and various European draconists (knights of Austria, Naples, Kingdom of Hungary, Spain, etc.)
1389		A 20,000 strong Serbian army led by Prince Lazar Hrebeljanović of Rascia, Vlatko Vuković of Bosnia, Miloš Obilić and most other prominent nobles faced the better equipped and trained Ottoman army in the Battle of Kosovo. Casualties on both sides were extremely high – both leaders died in the battle (Serbian Lazar Hrebeljanović and Ottoman sultan Murad I) and most of the Serbian aristocracy became extinct. Most of the Empire was now in Ottoman hands save for the Serbian Despotate, Montenegro and Bosnia which soon followed.

== 15th century ==
Year	Date	Event
1429		Belgrade is returned to the control of the Kingdom of Hungary following the death of Despot Stefan Lazarević. Đurađ Branković moves his capital to Smederevo.
1456		The Byzantine Empire collapses.
1456		The Siege of Belgrade, one of the greatest crusade wars of medieval times takes place in Belgrade as Sultan Mehmed II besieges the city with 150,000 soldiers and over 100 ships. Joint Hungarian and Serbian troops, aided by other Christian nations, repel the Ottoman forces. Pope Calixtus III praises Belgrade and its defender John Hunyadi as the Saviors of Christianity. Catholic Belgrade is now the only bastion of Christianity in the Balkans. Massive reconstruction of the city is under way.

== 16th century ==
Year	Date	Event
1537		Klis Fortress succumbs to the Ottomans enabling Senj to become a Croatian Habsburg Uskok (pirate) stronghold in the Adriatic Sea. Although nominally accepting the sovereignty of the Habsburg Emperor Ferdinand I, Uskoci were a law unto themselves, comprise by refugees from Croatia, Bosnia and Serbia.
1567		The Republic of Venice and the Ottoman Empire clash over Uskoks and their allegiance. The Kingdom of Spain, the Habsburg Empire and the Papal States join the war in support of the Venetians and Uskoks ultimately defeating the Turks. Stojan Janković was one of the military leaders of Dalmatian uskoks and a high-ranking Venetian military officer.

== 17th century ==
Year	Date	Event
1699		Members of the Holy League – the Habsburg monarchy, the Polish–Lithuanian Commonwealth, the Republic of Venice and the Russian Empire – conclude a peace treaty with the Ottoman Empire in which the territories of modern Vojvodina and Slavonia are passed to the Habsburg Empire in the Treaty of Karlovci. Following the Congress Sremski Karlovci and Novi Sad become major hubs of Serbian culture in the Habsburg Empire. Serbs enter the Enlightenment period alongside other Western nations leaving behind the previous Ottoman-imposed values.

== 18th century ==
Year	Date	Event
1748		Holy Roman Empress Maria Theresa gives royal city rights to Novi Sad, the biggest Serbian settlement in this Empire, following the capitulation of Habsburg Serbia. The city becomes known as Serbian Athens and a place of Serbian national revival. Most of Serbian culture, including its patriarchy (Metropolitanate of Karlovci), is now "in exile" across the Danube and Sava rivers overlooking Ottoman Serbia to the south. More Serbian cities are granted a Free Royal Status in years to come chiefly by Maria Theresa of Austria: Sombor, Bečkerek, Subotica (Maria-Theresiopolis), etc.
1755		Serbs permanently settle in the Russian Empire fleeing from Ottoman onslaughts in the Balkans. The Czar gives them the territories of New Serbia and Slavo-Serbia. Today these Serbs are mostly assimilated into Ukraine although their traces still reflect in toponyms such as the city of Slovianoserbsk and the district of Slovianoserbsk in south-eastern Ukraine.
1766		Turks abolish the Serbian Orthodox Church, subjugating it to Constantinople. Two Serbian Patriarchs have found refuge in the Habsburg Empire during the preceding migrations. Southern Serbia slowly becomes Muslim in character, following the colonization of Muslim Albanians and Turkish peoples.
1778		The first Serbian Faculty is established in Sombor, Habsburg Empire, under the name Teacher's College. It is the oldest higher-education facility in the region.

== 19th century ==
Year	Date	Event
1804		Napoleon annexes the Bay of Kotor to the First French Empire as a part of the Illyrian provinces. The Venetian Republic collapses after almost 1000 years of existence.
1808		The country's Narodni Zbor (Revolutionary Parliament) adopts the first constitutional act in this part of Europe defining Serbia as a constitutional monarchy under Karađorđe's supreme rule.
1813		The Revolutionary Serbia is crushed facing the Ottomans as they invade the country with 200,000 soldiers. The lack of support from Imperial Russia, who were at war against Napoleon at the time, also contributed to the Serbian defeat. Widespread revenge attacks upon civilians, nobles and "Intelligentsia" trigger a second insurrection.
1816		The Ottoman governor, Marashli Ali Pasha, approves partial autonomy for the rebel province pressured by Imperial Russia and the Habsburg Empire– the supervisors and protectors of the Serbian people in the Sultanate.
1848		The Spring of Nations erupts in Europe. The Serbs of Habsburg Empire demand self-rule according to the 1691 charter of Leopold I, Emperor of Austria. The Serbs proclaimed the creation of autonomous Serbian Vojvodina in Sremski Karlovci as the Serb army in the Habsburg monarchy clashes with the Hungarians.
1850		In Vienna Serbian and Croatian linguists agree to create a unified literary language based on the Shtokavian dialect. It becomes known as Serbo-Croatian for the next 150 years. The aim is to establish closer cultural ties between the two closest nations and boost local Serbian support for the Croatian cause.
1860		Franz Joseph of Austria abolishes the Serbian crownland of Voivodship of Serbia and Tamiš Banat igniting a revolt among Serbs without any success.
1867		The Habsburg Empire is replaced by the Dual monarchy of Austria-Hungary. The Serbian lands are split between the two.
1867		Southwards, in the Principality of Serbia, Serbs rebel against the Ottoman authorities following the bombardment of Belgrade. Great Britain and France urge the Ottomans to withdraw their troops from Serbia. The Principality of Serbia is now de facto independent— 50 years after the Second Serbian Uprising.
1869		Subotica, one of the biggest Serbian settlements, is connected to the West by railway.
1873		Banat Krajina is abolished and included into Transleithania; despite the wishes of the majority Serbs and Germans. This is the first step towards the destruction of the Serb-populated Military Frontier inherited from the Habsburg Empire. By 1883 the Military Frontier is entirely abolished and incorporated into the Kingdom of Hungary and the Kingdom of Croatia-Slavonia, save for the Bay of Kotor (Austria).
1877		The Russo-Turkish War begins. The majority peoples, the Bosnian Serbs, launch an uprising against the Ottomans in Nevesinje declaring their unification with the Principality of Serbia. Nikola Pašić and Nicholas I of Montenegro proclaim the formal independence of Serbia and Montenegro. The Ottoman Empire declares war on Serbia and Montenegro.
1878		Christian troops besiege Istanbul. Western interference stops the collapse of Ottoman Turkey by acknowledging de jure independence of Montenegro, Serbia and Romania with the Treaty of Berlin: all of whom have already been sovereign for some time prior to the Congress.
1882		The Kingdom of Serbia (5th Serbian Realm) is proclaimed under austrophile King Milan Obrenović following a corruption scandal he was involved in.
1885		The Serbo-Bulgarian War results in the country's humiliation following the Unification of Bulgaria increasing hostility toward the House of Obrenović.
1889		King Milan Obrenović abdicates the throne in favour of his minor (age) son Aleksandar Obrenović. Austrophile policy continues.
1893		Aleksandar Obrenović assumes power following a coup d'état.

== 20th century ==
Year	Date	Event
1903		The May Coup d'Etat results in the assassination of the royal couple King Aleksandar Obrenović and Queen Draga Mašin by Black Hand activists.
1906		The Pig War between Austria-Hungary and the Kingdom of Serbia begins. Austria imposes an economic blockade on Serbia following Serbia's decision to improve cooperation with France, Britain and Bulgaria. Serbia eventually triumphs with the aid of Western allies.
1908		At the peak of the economic blockade Austria-Hungary annexes Bosnia and Herzegovina triggering the Bosnian crisis in Europe.
1908		The Young Turk Revolution starts within the Ottoman Empire. As Bulgaria proclaims independence Serbia starts looking toward Kosovo and Macedonia in the south having to accept the Bosnian occupation.
1910		The Kingdom of Montenegro is proclaimed in Cetinje under King Nicholas I of Montenegro. His long-term programme is the restoration of the Serbian Empire with himself as an Emperor. Two rival Serbian dynasties now fight for supremacy among Serbs.
1912		The Balkan Wars begin as Montenegro and Serbia declare war on the Ottoman Empire followed by Bulgaria and Greece. The Balkan League besieges Constantinople.
1912		Albania proclaims independence from the Ottoman Empire and is approved in the Treaty of London forcing Serbo-Montenegrin troops to withdraw from the country.
1914	28 June	The Assassination in Sarajevo of Archduke Franz Ferdinand sparks a major European crisis. The July Ultimatum is delivered to Serbian authorities demanding that Austro-Hungarian troops march into Serbia. The Kingdom of Serbia rejects the proposal supported by Imperial Russia, France and Great Britain. Austria-Hungary and the German Empire declare war on the Kingdom of Serbia triggering the outbreak of World War I
1914	August	The Battle of Cer marks the First Allied Victory in the War as the Serbian First Army under field marshal Stepa Stepanović pushes the Austro-Hungarian Army across the Drina and Sava rivers expelling them from the Kingdom of Serbia. Serbia suffers 16,000 casualties, compared to 30,000 Austro-Hungarian casualties in this part of the Serbian Campaign.
1914	August	Three months later Austria-Hungary launches the 2nd invasion on the Kingdom of Serbia. Belgrade population falls from 110,000 to 20,000 following the bombing from the Sava and Danube rivers. The Battle of Kolubara begins resulting in the second decisive victory of the Serbian First Army and retreat of Austria-Hungary across the rivers a month later. Field marshals Radomir Putnik and Živojin Mišić's strategy has been hailed throughout the country. Serbia is free for almost a year but at a terrible cost; it lost approximately 170,000 men – almost a half of its entire army.
1915	October	A typhus epidemic begins. 150,000 people die in Serbia this year alone. The country's population has already dropped by 10% since the beginning of the war
1915	October	The 3rd invasion of Serbia begins in October. Austria-Hungary conquers Belgrade marching toward the south. Bulgaria invades Serbia cutting its supply route from Greece. The Serbian First Army is forced to retreat across the Sar Mountains of Albania and Kosovo. Despite Austro-Hungarian and Bulgarian occupation and the retreat of Serbian Army the Kingdom of Serbia never capitulated.
1915	October	The Yugoslav Committee, founded by the Austro-Hungarian Serbs and Croats in exile, is proclaimed in London. Its primary goal is the liberation of the South Slavic lands from Austro-Hungary with the intention of joining the Kingdom of Serbia.
1915	October	The secret London Pact offers, among many other European territories, western Dalmatia to the Kingdom of Italy and the eastern parts to the Kingdom of Serbia that would also be combined with Bosnia and Herzegovina, most of Slavonia and a large part of Vojvodina and northern Albania.
Creation of Yugoslavia
1918	October	Austria-Hungary capitulates disintegrating into several statelets; the largest one being the State of Slovenes, Croats and Serbs governed from Zagreb
1918	October	Joint Serbian, British and French forces expel Bulgaria from the pre-war Serbian territories (including Kosovo and Macedonia). Bulgaria capitulates.
1918	October	World War I comes to an end following the decisive Entente Powers victory. Contribution to the Entente had large consequences: the Kingdom of Serbia has lost 28% of its entire prewar population falling from 4.5 to 3.2 million people.
1918	October	Syrmia breaks off from the State of Slovenes, Croats and Serbs and joins the Kingdom of Serbia.
1918	October	Vojvodina (Banat, Bačka and Baranja) joins the Kingdom of Serbia by the decision of the Serb National Board in Novi Sad.
1918	October	The Kingdom of Montenegro overthrows its dynasty of the Petrović and accepts the supremacy of the House of Karađorđević.
1918	November	The State of Slovenes, Croats and Serbs joins the Kingdom of Serbia fearing the possible Italian invasion. The newly created South Slavic state is considered a legal successor of the Kingdom of Serbia and is openly labelled as hostile by the Kingdom of Italy which was hoping to annex the rest of Istria, Dalmatia and Montenegro
1918	November	The Kingdom of Serbs, Croats and Slovenes (First Yugoslavia) is proclaimed in Belgrade under Regent Alexander I. Belgrade unites with Zemun and Pančevo (formerly Serb-populated cities under the Habsburg Monarchy).
1919	January	The Christmas Uprising erupts in Montenegro as supporters of the House of Petrović, allegedly aided by the Kingdom of Italy, oppose to acknowledge the Karađorđević dynasty and the decision of the Grand National Assembly. Guerilla clashes would continue for another 6 years and result in the defeat of the separatists.
1919	September	Italian poet and fascist Gabriele d'Annunzio enters the Free State of Rijeka bringing the two neighbours to the verge of war.
1920		The Treaty of Rapallo recognizes the state's independence.
1921		The Kingdom of Italy invades Rijeka and annexes it despite Belgrade's objections.
1924		the Balkan Entente is formed by the Kingdom of Serbs, Croats and Slovenes, the Kingdom of Romania, Greece and Turkey as a counterbalance to the revisionists (chiefly Italy and Hungary). It also served as a buffer-zone with the Soviet Union.
1929		January 6 Dictatorship is introduced by King Alexander of Yugoslavia following the assassination of the Croatian Peasant Party leader and the most important Croatian politician at the time, Stjepan Radić, by a Montenegrin Serb member of the Serbian People's Radical Party, Puniša Račić. The Constitution is suspended and the Parliament dissolved as the King starts his 2-year dictatorship aimed at restoring order in the ethnically divided Kingdom. The state is renamed as the Kingdom of Yugoslavia and its internal borders are reintroduced through 9 banovinas.
1931		The new Constitution of the Kingdom of Yugoslavia is introduced by King Alexander putting an end to his 2-year long dictatorship. The Croatian question again becomes activate again as many start demanding federalization of the unitary monarchy. Many Croatian politicians end up in prison, including Vlatko Maček leader of the CPP, under the pretext that they dismiss the Constitution.
1934		King Alexander I of Yugoslavia is shot dead by the Bulgarian and Croatian fascists, Vlado Chernosemski and the Ustaše. Prince Paul temporarily seizes the throne. Alexander's son Peter II was a minor at the time.
1939		Former political prisoner Vlatko Maček is appointed vice premier of the Kingdom of Yugoslavia following an appeasement policy of the Royal Court towards the Croats. An autonomous Banovina of Croatia is carved out of large parts of Croatia as well as parts of Bosnia and Vojvodina. As Vlatko Maček announces the potential independence of the province and a deep crisis in the Kingdom follows. Yugoslavia has started to disintegrate.
1941		Massive Luftwaffe airstrikes hit the Yugoslav capital as Hitler decides to crush the rebellion causing 17,000 casualties in the Battle of Belgrade. Other Serbian cities follow suit such as Leskovac, Kraljevo and Niš.
1941		The Kingdom of Italy, Third Reich, Fascist Hungary and Fascist Bulgaria invade and dismantle the Kingdom of Yugoslavia aided by Banovina of Croatia, Albania and some domestic minorities.
1941		The Kingdom of Yugoslavia capitulates as its royal army disintegrates following the evacuation of the royal family to Africa and a multi-party occupation. Greece succumbs to the Axis 10 days later. Operation Barbarossa begins with a months delay enabling the Soviet Union to regroup during the Axis invasion of Southern Europe.
1941		The Yugoslav Army in the Fatherland, a guerilla force loyal to the Kingdom of Yugoslavia's government in exile, is founded on Ravna Gora by Colonel Draža Mihajlović. Until the Yalta Conference in 1943 this royal army would be considered a chief ally to Great Britain, the US and the Soviet Union. Their chief opponents within the country would be the communist Yugoslav partisans.
1941		The Serbian division of the Partisan resistance movement, loyal to communists of Josip Broz Tito, launches an uprising in the Nazi-occupied town of Užice proclaiming it a free state, The Republic of Užice. Uprisings also erupt in Italian-held Montenegro, Bosnia and Slovenia. Užice succumbs to the Germans 4 months later.
1941		First clashes between the royalists of Draža Mihajlović and the communists of Josip Broz Tito occur at this time over the supremacy over Yugoslavia; this would expand the civil war on territory of Bosnia and Hercegovina: Communist partisans, Royalist chetniks and Fascist Ustaše.
1941	March	Prince Paul of Yugoslavia signs the Tripartite Pact on March 25 in Vienna fearing an invasion of the Axis powers into his weakened Kingdom.
1941	March	After the coup d'état, conducted under command of generals Simović and Mirković and supported by British intelligence with 300,000 pound sterling, massive demonstrations erupt in downtown Belgrade as an overwhelming majority of Serbs denounce the Pact Treaty. Following a military coup d'état 17-year-old Peter II assumes the throne naming Dušan Simović as his chief general. The Kingdom of Yugoslavia withdraws its support for the Axis powers on March 27.
1941	September	Captain D. T. Hudson of the Royal Navy, meets with the commander of the royalists, Draža Mihajlović.
1941		Several joint Axis offensives, made of German, Italian, NDH, Bulgarian and Chetnik units, is launched in Bosnia and Herzegovina, aimed at crushing the partisan strongholds in the area. The decisive victory of the Yugoslav National Liberation Army (YNLA) in the Battle of Neretva results in the devastation of Chetnik forces in Bosnia.
1943	October	As Fascist Italy capitulates in October, Nazi troops march into its territories along the coast of Yugoslavia (Dalmatia, Herzegovina, Montenegro, Raška, Kosovo).
1943	November	The 2nd Congress of AVNOJ (Anti-Fascist Council of National Liberation of Yugoslavia) proclaims the Yugoslav federation, denouncing the King's right to return to the country after World War II is over. The next day, the Tehran Conference, a meeting between Joseph Stalin, Franklin D. Roosevelt and Winston Churchill, decides to shift their support from the Yugoslav Royal Army to their rivals, the Communist Yugoslav partisans, and de facto legitimize a Communist regime in Yugoslavia.
1944	June	The Royal Yugoslav government in exile recognizes the partisans as Yugoslavia's legitimate armed forces, ordering the Royal Army to join the newly named Partisan Yugoslav army, following the Tito-Šubašić agreement on the Adriatic island of Vis. The King calls for Serbs, Croats and Slovenes to unite into a single army under partisan flag. Draža Mihajlović and many of his chetniks refuse to obey and continue fighting on their own, with neither royal nor Allied support, calling on Serbs to emancipate themselves from Yugoslavia in the form of Greater Serbia.
1945	January	The YNLA liberates the Jasenovac concentration camp, following a retreat of Nazi and Ustaše forces. 50,000 prisoners who were able to walk were freed and led from the camp. Massive destruction of data preceded the liberation, making it hard to determine the extent of the Serbian Genocide. The numbers reach several hundred thousand victims.
1945	January	Aided by the Soviet army, Yugoslav Partisans expel fascist and Nazi forces from the country, ultimately defeating the royalists as well. Ustaše flee the country as well, among whom also Ante Pavelić, Petar Brzica, etc. Yugoslav Danube Swabians are also forced to leave the country, as well as many Hungarians and Italians.
1945	November	Federal People's Republic of Yugoslavia or Second Yugoslavia is proclaimed by the Yugoslav Federal Parliament in Belgrade. The monarchy is officially abolished and the royal family banned from entering the country.
1945	November	Serbian lands are dismantled under a pretext of Serbian hegemony and self-determination, being given to republic of Montenegro, provinces of Kosovo and Vojvodina, republic of Macedonia, republic of Bosnia-Herzegovina, even to republic of Croatia (Baranja region), leaving Serbia, in form of Serbia proper, crippled in territory and population despite its Allied-orientation. Territories of Croatia are expanded into Baranja, Dalmatia and Istria under the ethnic balance policy put forward by the new communist government of Josip Broz Tito.
1946		The National Committee for the War Crimes and Reparations concludes that 1,7 million people have died during World War II in Yugoslavia. However, subsequent estimates by statisticians revealed the actual number of deaths to be approximately one million. Many were victims of civil war, including the Ustaše genocide of Serbs and the Chetnik genocidal campaign against Bosnian Muslims and Croats. Approximately 350,000 Serbs fell victim under the Ustaše. About 100,000 total victims (Serbs 45,000–52,000, Roma 15,000–27,000, Jews 12,000–20,000, Croats and Bosnian Muslims 5,000–12,000) in the Jasenovac concentration camp. Around 68,000 Muslims and Croats perished under the Chetniks.
1948		The SFRY is expelled from the World Communist League, after refusing to accept the Soviet Union's supremacy in the communist world. Yugoslavia, therefore, has never signed the Warsaw Pact nor has it been, consequently, behind the Iron Curtain, unlike its immediate neighbours. From that point on Yugoslav history differs from that of cold-war Eastern Europe
1954		The Free Territory of Trieste is dissolved by the Treaty of Osimo, splitting it roughly in half between the SFRY and Italy, putting an end to a decade-long dispute between the Adriatic neighbours.
1968		The Belgrade Spring erupts among studentry of Yugoslavia, ignited by Belgrade and Zagreb's student demands to improve the conditions in the two largest Universities. Croats also ask for their own literary language apart from Serbian language, for the first time since the Vienna Treaty in 1850.
1974		A new federal Constitution awards greater powers to individual republics and provinces, shifting it into a voluntary confederation with a right of self-determination for each of the subjects. The Serbian Provinces of Kosovo and Metohija and Vojvodina are de facto separated from Serbia, as they were awarded state-treatment in the Federal Parliament, where they could veto any Serbian decision.
Timeline of the breakup of Yugoslavia
1980		President Josip Broz Tito dies in Ljubljana at the age of 88. Ethnic tensions rise across the country.
1981		Riots erupt among Albanians of Kosovo, as they ask for the recognition of the State of Kosovo. The uprising was brutally suppressed by the JNA, as Kosovo Serbs fear being pulled into a civil war. By this date, the population share of Kosovo Serbs has dropped down to 15% compared to 25% a decade earlier.
1986		The Memorandum of the Serbian Academy of Sciences and Arts is proclaimed in Belgrade, calling for a fundamental change and the country's reorganization. This document marks the rise of Serbian nationalism within SFRY, opening the Serbian Question, at the time the country was battling ever-high recession and unemployment rate. Kosovo Serbs and Croatian Serbs are pointed out as the main victims of ethnic hatred and chauvinism, following several clashes with local Albanians and Croats, respectively.
1989	28 June	Slobodan Milošević delivers his Gazimestan Speech in front of 1,000,000 Serbs at the central celebration marking the 600th anniversary of the Battle of Kosovo. He calls for a "full equality among peoples of Yugoslavia", demanding an end to the "dramatic ethnic and political divisions". This was basically a message to both his political (democratic) and nationalist (Croat, Bosniak) opponents. His popularity skyrockets among nationalist Serbs, leading to his victory in the elections for the Serbian president a few months later.
1990		The League of Communists of Yugoslavia dissolves along ethnic lines, as Slovene and Croatian representatives storm out of the Congress after opposing the strengthening of the Union. The first free elections are held several months later in Croatia (Croatian parliamentary election, 1990) and Slovenia, where separatist options have prevailed overwhelmingly.
1990		The Parliament of Croatia ratifies a new Constitution, declaring the indigenous Serbs of Croatia (12.2%) a national minority rather than a constituent nation. Serbs have enjoyed that autonomy de facto since the Croat-Hungarian Ausgleich in the 19th century. Franjo Tuđman, leader of the Croatian Democratic Union, publicly denies the Serbian Genocide and the extent of the Holocaust, spreading fear among minority Croatian Serbs as he assumes power as the president of Croatia.
1990		Serb-populated regions of Croatia organize a poll on their self-rule within Croatia. The Log Revolution is also launched in the hinterland of Dalmatia, the Serbian city of Knin, blocking Croatian roads and splitting the country into two parts. The National Council of the Croatian Serbs, led by Milan Babić, declares "the autonomy of the Serbian people on ethnic and historic territories on which they live and which are within the current boundaries of the Republic of Croatia as a federal unit of the SFR Yugoslavia" in form of Kninska Krajina.
1990		The Slovenian independence referendum passes with an 88% support. Independence would have been declared within the succeeding 6 months
1991		Hundreds of thousands of people gather in downtown Belgrade peacefully demonstrating against Slobodan Milošević. The government orders "restoration of order" by force deploying tanks onto the streets of the capital. 2 people are killed and over 300 injured in the clashes that follow; the democratic opposition led by Vuk Drašković and Zoran Đinđić is de facto suppressed for years to come.
1991		Croatian War of Independence begins, following the Plitvice Lakes incident. Security forces of the Republic of Croatia clash with rebel Serbs of Croatia as they take over the Serb-populated territory of the national park. 2 policemen die – one from each side. An emergency session of the Federal Parliament decides to send the troops of the JNA into the region. The National Assembly of Serbia supports this decision asking for the protection of Serbs.
1991		The Borovo Selo massacre takes place in the Serb-populated village of Borovo Selo in eastern Croatia as 4 Croatian police-officers attempt to change the Yugoslav flag with the Croatian one after which they are captured by Vojislav Šešelj's troops. Attempting to free them Croatian policemen are led into an ambush and twelve are killed and some mutilated. Numbers of the Croatian Serbs killed in the incident varies anywhere between four on one side to twenty on the other.
1991	June	A series of Yugoslav wars begin as Croatia and Slovenia declare independence from the SFRY opposed by the Serbs and the JNA. Slovenia is granted its independence following a Ten-Day War, however the conflict in Croatia is bound to last, as the Republic of Serbian Krajina emerges.
1991	June	Serb forces embark on an ethnic cleansing campaign in the territory under their control. 78,000 people – virtually the whole Croat, Muslim and non-Serb population is forcibly removed, deported or killed.
1991	June	Starting in July, Serb forces and the JNA start to attack Croatian-majority areas in the Operation Coast-91. In August they attack Vukovar starting the most bloody battle of the Croatian war.
1991	June	In December Serb paramilitary forces kill 43 civilians in the Voćin massacre.
1991	17 September	A Serbian teenage girl is killed in Sisak by a bullet fired through a window which is a matter of ongoing investigation.
1991	1 October	JNA, Montenegro and Serb forces attack Dubrovnik bombing a tourist attraction. Between 82 and 88 civilians are killed.
1991	10 October	the Lovas massacre begins in which Serb paramilitary forces kill 70 civilians which is a matter of ongoing investigation.
1991	16 October	120 Serbs are massacred in the town of Gospić (region of Lika, Croatia) by members of a Croatian paramilitary unit in what the Croatian human rights activists called the first major massacre of civilians in the Yugoslav civil wars. The mastermind of the massacre, Mirko Norac, was charged with crimes against humanity by both Croatia and the ICTY for his involvement in the mass killings of Serbian civilians during the Croatian War of Independence
1991	18 November	Vukovar falls and Serb paramilitary forces massacre over 250 civilians and POWs.
1992		SFRY (Second Yugoslavia) is abolished following the declaration of independence of the Republic of Macedonia.
1992		Montenegro's independence referendum fails as its citizens overwhelmingly support union with Serbia.
1992		The Federal Republic of Yugoslavia or Third Yugoslavia comes into existence in April.
1992	May	The Siege of Sarajevo is officially imposed by the Bosnian Serbs and their forces led by Radovan Karadžić as chief commander. It is aimed at murdering and terrorizing the civilian population of the city. It lasted for 44 months and resulted in 12,000 casualties; chiefly among Bosniaks.
1993		The Croatian army invades southern regions of the self-proclaimed Republic of Serbian Krajina. In the clashes that follow between different paramilitary units up to 500 Krajina Serbs and 120 Croats lose their lives. The Croatian Army withdraws its forces after a successful campaign.
1993		A Croatian military operation in the Medak Pocket is launched in September 1993 led by Mirko Norac and Rahim Ademi, the Hague Tribunal indictees. The predominantly Serbian population of the several adjacent villages, 400 strong, leaves the area. 16 are killed.
1995		Operation Flash, conducted by the Croatian Army in May, successfully recaptures Republic of Serbian Krajina-held west Slavonia. 30.000 Croatian Serbs were forced out of the area and 285 have been killed during this action. 1,500 were arrested and imprisoned.
1995		Milan Martić, leader of the RSK (war criminal according to the ICTY), orders the shelling of Zagreb far beyond the Serbian held-territories. 7 people are killed and hundreds wounded in the Zagreb rocket attack.
1995		Operation Storm, a large-scale military operation is carried out throughout the self-proclaimed Republic of Serbian Krajina (RSK) by the Croatian Army in August 1995 de facto ending the Croatian War which took 20,000 lives. In the aftermath of the operation 250,000 Croatian Serb civilians fled the area. More than 1,200 civilians who had remained in the area were killed by the members of the Croatian army, police forces and armed civilians during several days fighting as well as some 700 Serbian military forces.
1995		After coming under international pressure, Serbia cut off support for the RSK in early 1995. In early May 1995, Croatian forces recaptured western Slavonia. In August 1995, Croatian forces recaptured Krajina, leaving only eastern Slavonia under RSK control. On August 3, 1995, under UN mediation in Geneva, the RSK and Croatia engaged in discussions and the U.S. ambassador announced that Croatia had agreed to make significant concessions. On August 5, 1995, however, Croatian forces attacked Krajina and began to move to eastern Slavonia. On August 7, 1995, Serbia deployed tanks to the Croatian border. The Croatian offensive led to the displacement of 150,000 Serbs, leaving them refugees. Croatia's Operation Storm from August 4–7, 1995, was the most intense period of fighting between Croatian and Serb forces affecting Serb civilians during the war; during the shelling in Knin, many were forced to flee. Ante Gotovina and Mladen Markač, the Croatian commanders of the operation, were put on trial by the International Criminal Tribunal for the Former Yugoslavia, but ultimately acquitted.
1995		Srebrenica massacre, the largest mass murder in Europe since the end of World War II, takes place in a Bosniak enclave within Republika Srpska following the retreat of the Dutch soldiers from this "UN safe zone". More than 8,000 Bosniak men, mostly civilians, are systematically executed by the Police and Army of Republika Srpska under the command of general Ratko Mladić who is still at large. Eventually the massacre in Srebrenica is confirmed as genocide at the International Court of Justice – The ruling by the International Court of Justice (ICJ) in the case brought by Bosnia and Herzegovina against Serbia was delivered on February 26, 2007.
1995		Amidst intense pressure by the Contact Group, the Dayton Peace Agreement, is reached by the three leaders Franjo Tuđman of Croatia, Alija Izetbegović of Bosnia and Slobodan Milošević of Yugoslavia putting an end to a three-year-long Bosnian war which claimed 100,000 lives. Bosnia and Herzegovina is acknowledged as a sovereign state of 2 equal-sized entities; the Federation of Bosnia and Herzegovina and Republika Srpska.
1998		Clashes between the Yugoslav Army and the rebel Albanian forces started in Kosovo (KLA) escalate into a violent conflict. A civil war between the majority Albanians and minority Serbs is underway.
1999		In January the Račak massacre occurs in which Serb forces kill at least 45 Albanians including the leader of the KLA Adem Jashari.
1999		In response to Serb forces' ethnic cleansing of Kosovo, NATO starts bombing targets in Serbia. Slobodan Milošević announces the mandatory mobilisation of the troops.
1999		Ethnic cleansing of Albanians continues in Kosovo despite NATO bombardment of the Yugoslav troops.
1999		There are numerous killings of Albanians and Serbs following the armed clashes between the two. NATO bombs major Serbian cities including downtown Belgrade as well as Niš city market, the bridges of Novi Sad and the oil refinery of Pančevo.
1999		16 technicians are killed following the bombing of the national television RTS in downtown Belgrade and tens of others in civilian bombings on trains in Grdelica gorge, Niš market, Belgrade and Varadin hospitals, and refugees north of Pristina.
1999		The Kosovo war ends following an agreement reached in Kumanovo after 3 months of aerial bombardments. Serbian casualties range anywhere between 3,500 and 7,000 including the ones missing, while Albanian casualties stand at about 10,000 victims overall including the pre-war period. UN Resolution 1244 acknowledges sovereignty of FR Yugoslavia over the province but puts it under UN-occupation.
1999		An ethnic cleansing of the Serbian population begins following the retreat of the Yugoslav Army and the arrival of Albanians protected by the UN and NATO. 200,000 Kosovo Serbs are expelled from or escape from Kosovo leaving only a fraction of pre-war Serbian population behind – about 140,000. Serbs fall to a mere 7% of the overall population as Albanians repopulate former Serbian houses and take over their businesses. Tens of medieval Serbian Orthodox churches are leveled to the ground. Around 3,000 Kosovo Serbs are believed to have been killed.
2000		Slobodan Milošević is ousted following the overthrow on October 5th and million-strong demonstrations in central Belgrade. Vojislav Koštunica assumes power as the first democratic president of Yugoslavia.

== 21st century ==
Year	Date	Event
2001		Albanian guerilla forces linked to the KLA attack Yugoslav forces within the Ground Safety Zone between Serbia proper and Kosovo. The conflict went on for several weeks spreading into Serbia's municipalities of Preševo, Bujanovac and Medveđa before the resistance is finally suppressed. Guerilla fighters take refuge in the Republic of Macedonia igniting a 2001 Macedonia conflict.
2003		Third Yugoslavia is abolished and replaced with a state union of Serbia and Montenegro with Belgrade its capital.
2003		Serbian Prime Minister, Zoran Đinđić, is assassinated in front of the governmental palace in Belgrade by a criminal clan from Zemun who opposed his liberal and pro-European actions. Hundreds of thousands escort the late PM to his burial site.
2003		A state of emergency is declared in Serbia. Operation Sablja would ultimately succeed in bringing to justice hundreds of criminals throughout the country without serious violations of human rights; according to most European sources.
2003		2004 unrest in Kosovo. 36 medieval Serbian Orthodox Monasteries are leveled to the ground, over 1,000 Serbian houses sacked and torched, and thousands of Kosovo Serbs expelled from the province. 19 Kosovo Serbs are killed during the fighting.
2005		SAA talks with the EU are launched aimed at providing closer ties with the EU. The state becomes an EU potential candidate country.
2006	March 11	Death of Slobodan Milošević.
2006	June 3	Montenegro declares independence from the state union of Serbia and Montenegro. Both countries become fully sovereign states.
2008	February 17	Kosovo unilaterally declares independence from Serbia, which does not recognize the move. The declaration is only partially recognized by the international community.
2011	May 26	Bosnian Serb military commander Ratko Mladić arrested.
2011	July 20	Former President of Republic of Serbian Krajina, the last ICTY war crimes suspect Goran Hadžić arrested.

== See also ==
- List of years in Serbia
- Timeline of Belgrade

Region	until 1918	1918– 1929	1929– 1945	1941– 1945	1945– 1946	1946– 1963	1963– 1992	1992– 2003	2003– 2006	2006– 2008	since 2008
Slovenia	Part of Austria-Hungary including the Bay of Kotor See also: Kingdom of Croatia-Slavonia (1868–1918) Kingdom of Dalmatia (1815–1918) Condominium of Bosnia and Herzegovina (1878–1918)	State of Slovenes, Croats and Serbs (1918) Kingdom of Serbs, Croats and Slovenes (1918–1929) Kingdom of Yugoslavia (1929–1943) See also: Republic of Prekmurje (1919) Banat, Bačka and Baranja (1918–1919) Free State of Fiume (1920–1924) (1924–1945) Italian province of Zadar (1920–1947)		Annexed by Italy, Germany, and Hungary^{a}	Democratic Federal Yugoslavia (1943–1945) Federal People's Republic of Yugoslavia (1945–1963) Socialist Federal Republic of Yugoslavia (1963–1992) Consisted of the Socialist Republics of: Slovenia (1945–1991); Croatia (1945–1991); Bosnia and Herzegovina (1945–1992) Serbia (1945–1992) (included the autonomous provinces of Vojvodina and Kosovo) Montenegro (1945–1992); Macedonia (1945–1991) See also: Free Territory of Trieste (1947–1954)^{h}			Republic of Slovenia; Ten-Day War			
Dalmatia	Part of Austria-Hungary including the Bay of Kotor See also: Kingdom of Croatia-Slavonia (1868–1918) Kingdom of Dalmatia (1815–1918) Condominium of Bosnia and Herzegovina (1878–1918)	State of Slovenes, Croats and Serbs (1918) Kingdom of Serbs, Croats and Slovenes (1918–1929) Kingdom of Yugoslavia (1929–1943) See also: Republic of Prekmurje (1919) Banat, Bačka and Baranja (1918–1919) Free State of Fiume (1920–1924) (1924–1945) Italian province of Zadar (1920–1947)		Independent State of Croatia (1941–1945) Puppet state of Germany. Parts annexed by Italy. Međimurje and Baranja annexed by Hungary.	Democratic Federal Yugoslavia (1943–1945) Federal People's Republic of Yugoslavia (1945–1963) Socialist Federal Republic of Yugoslavia (1963–1992) Consisted of the Socialist Republics of: Slovenia (1945–1991); Croatia (1945–1991); Bosnia and Herzegovina (1945–1992) Serbia (1945–1992) (included the autonomous provinces of Vojvodina and Kosovo) Montenegro (1945–1992); Macedonia (1945–1991) See also: Free Territory of Trieste (1947–1954)^{h}			Republic of Croatia^{b} Croatian War of Independence			
Slavonia	Part of Austria-Hungary including the Bay of Kotor See also: Kingdom of Croatia-Slavonia (1868–1918) Kingdom of Dalmatia (1815–1918) Condominium of Bosnia and Herzegovina (1878–1918)	State of Slovenes, Croats and Serbs (1918) Kingdom of Serbs, Croats and Slovenes (1918–1929) Kingdom of Yugoslavia (1929–1943) See also: Republic of Prekmurje (1919) Banat, Bačka and Baranja (1918–1919) Free State of Fiume (1920–1924) (1924–1945) Italian province of Zadar (1920–1947)		Independent State of Croatia (1941–1945) Puppet state of Germany. Parts annexed by Italy. Međimurje and Baranja annexed by Hungary.	Democratic Federal Yugoslavia (1943–1945) Federal People's Republic of Yugoslavia (1945–1963) Socialist Federal Republic of Yugoslavia (1963–1992) Consisted of the Socialist Republics of: Slovenia (1945–1991); Croatia (1945–1991); Bosnia and Herzegovina (1945–1992) Serbia (1945–1992) (included the autonomous provinces of Vojvodina and Kosovo) Montenegro (1945–1992); Macedonia (1945–1991) See also: Free Territory of Trieste (1947–1954)^{h}			Republic of Croatia^{b} Croatian War of Independence			
Croatia	Part of Austria-Hungary including the Bay of Kotor See also: Kingdom of Croatia-Slavonia (1868–1918) Kingdom of Dalmatia (1815–1918) Condominium of Bosnia and Herzegovina (1878–1918)	State of Slovenes, Croats and Serbs (1918) Kingdom of Serbs, Croats and Slovenes (1918–1929) Kingdom of Yugoslavia (1929–1943) See also: Republic of Prekmurje (1919) Banat, Bačka and Baranja (1918–1919) Free State of Fiume (1920–1924) (1924–1945) Italian province of Zadar (1920–1947)		Independent State of Croatia (1941–1945) Puppet state of Germany. Parts annexed by Italy. Međimurje and Baranja annexed by Hungary.	Democratic Federal Yugoslavia (1943–1945) Federal People's Republic of Yugoslavia (1945–1963) Socialist Federal Republic of Yugoslavia (1963–1992) Consisted of the Socialist Republics of: Slovenia (1945–1991); Croatia (1945–1991); Bosnia and Herzegovina (1945–1992) Serbia (1945–1992) (included the autonomous provinces of Vojvodina and Kosovo) Montenegro (1945–1992); Macedonia (1945–1991) See also: Free Territory of Trieste (1947–1954)^{h}			Republic of Croatia^{b} Croatian War of Independence			
Bosnia	Part of Austria-Hungary including the Bay of Kotor See also: Kingdom of Croatia-Slavonia (1868–1918) Kingdom of Dalmatia (1815–1918) Condominium of Bosnia and Herzegovina (1878–1918)	State of Slovenes, Croats and Serbs (1918) Kingdom of Serbs, Croats and Slovenes (1918–1929) Kingdom of Yugoslavia (1929–1943) See also: Republic of Prekmurje (1919) Banat, Bačka and Baranja (1918–1919) Free State of Fiume (1920–1924) (1924–1945) Italian province of Zadar (1920–1947)		Independent State of Croatia (1941–1945) Puppet state of Germany. Parts annexed by Italy. Međimurje and Baranja annexed by Hungary.	Democratic Federal Yugoslavia (1943–1945) Federal People's Republic of Yugoslavia (1945–1963) Socialist Federal Republic of Yugoslavia (1963–1992) Consisted of the Socialist Republics of: Slovenia (1945–1991); Croatia (1945–1991); Bosnia and Herzegovina (1945–1992) Serbia (1945–1992) (included the autonomous provinces of Vojvodina and Kosovo) Montenegro (1945–1992); Macedonia (1945–1991) See also: Free Territory of Trieste (1947–1954)^{h}			Bosnia and Herzegovina^{c} Bosnian War Consists of the Federation of Bosnia and Herzegovina (since 1995), Republika Srpska (since 1995), and Brčko District (since 2000).			
Herzegovina	Part of Austria-Hungary including the Bay of Kotor See also: Kingdom of Croatia-Slavonia (1868–1918) Kingdom of Dalmatia (1815–1918) Condominium of Bosnia and Herzegovina (1878–1918)	State of Slovenes, Croats and Serbs (1918) Kingdom of Serbs, Croats and Slovenes (1918–1929) Kingdom of Yugoslavia (1929–1943) See also: Republic of Prekmurje (1919) Banat, Bačka and Baranja (1918–1919) Free State of Fiume (1920–1924) (1924–1945) Italian province of Zadar (1920–1947)		Independent State of Croatia (1941–1945) Puppet state of Germany. Parts annexed by Italy. Međimurje and Baranja annexed by Hungary.	Democratic Federal Yugoslavia (1943–1945) Federal People's Republic of Yugoslavia (1945–1963) Socialist Federal Republic of Yugoslavia (1963–1992) Consisted of the Socialist Republics of: Slovenia (1945–1991); Croatia (1945–1991); Bosnia and Herzegovina (1945–1992) Serbia (1945–1992) (included the autonomous provinces of Vojvodina and Kosovo) Montenegro (1945–1992); Macedonia (1945–1991) See also: Free Territory of Trieste (1947–1954)^{h}			Bosnia and Herzegovina^{c} Bosnian War Consists of the Federation of Bosnia and Herzegovina (since 1995), Republika Srpska (since 1995), and Brčko District (since 2000).			
Vojvodina	Part of the Délvidék region of Hungary	State of Slovenes, Croats and Serbs (1918) Kingdom of Serbs, Croats and Slovenes (1918–1929) Kingdom of Yugoslavia (1929–1943) See also: Republic of Prekmurje (1919) Banat, Bačka and Baranja (1918–1919) Free State of Fiume (1920–1924) (1924–1945) Italian province of Zadar (1920–1947)		Autonomous Banat^{d} (part of the German; Territory of the Military Commander in Serbia)	Democratic Federal Yugoslavia (1943–1945) Federal People's Republic of Yugoslavia (1945–1963) Socialist Federal Republic of Yugoslavia (1963–1992) Consisted of the Socialist Republics of: Slovenia (1945–1991); Croatia (1945–1991); Bosnia and Herzegovina (1945–1992) Serbia (1945–1992) (included the autonomous provinces of Vojvodina and Kosovo) Montenegro (1945–1992); Macedonia (1945–1991) See also: Free Territory of Trieste (1947–1954)^{h}			Federal Republic of Yugoslavia Consisted of the Republic of Serbia (1992–2006) and Republic of Montenegro (1992–2006) Included Kosovo and Metohija, under UN administration, without control since 1999	State Union of Serbia and Montenegro Included Kosovo, under UN administration	Republic of Serbia Included the autonomous provinces of Vojvodina and Kosovo and Metohija under UN administration	Republic of Serbia Includes the autonomous province of Vojvodina; Kosovo claim
Central Serbia	Kingdom of Serbia (1882–1918)	State of Slovenes, Croats and Serbs (1918) Kingdom of Serbs, Croats and Slovenes (1918–1929) Kingdom of Yugoslavia (1929–1943) See also: Republic of Prekmurje (1919) Banat, Bačka and Baranja (1918–1919) Free State of Fiume (1920–1924) (1924–1945) Italian province of Zadar (1920–1947)		Territory of the Military Commander in Serbia (1941–1944) ^{e}	Democratic Federal Yugoslavia (1943–1945) Federal People's Republic of Yugoslavia (1945–1963) Socialist Federal Republic of Yugoslavia (1963–1992) Consisted of the Socialist Republics of: Slovenia (1945–1991); Croatia (1945–1991); Bosnia and Herzegovina (1945–1992) Serbia (1945–1992) (included the autonomous provinces of Vojvodina and Kosovo) Montenegro (1945–1992); Macedonia (1945–1991) See also: Free Territory of Trieste (1947–1954)^{h}			Federal Republic of Yugoslavia Consisted of the Republic of Serbia (1992–2006) and Republic of Montenegro (1992–2006) Included Kosovo and Metohija, under UN administration, without control since 1999	State Union of Serbia and Montenegro Included Kosovo, under UN administration	Republic of Serbia Included the autonomous provinces of Vojvodina and Kosovo and Metohija under UN administration	Republic of Serbia Includes the autonomous province of Vojvodina; Kosovo claim
Kosovo	Part of the Kingdom of Serbia (1912–1918)	State of Slovenes, Croats and Serbs (1918) Kingdom of Serbs, Croats and Slovenes (1918–1929) Kingdom of Yugoslavia (1929–1943) See also: Republic of Prekmurje (1919) Banat, Bačka and Baranja (1918–1919) Free State of Fiume (1920–1924) (1924–1945) Italian province of Zadar (1920–1947)		Mostly annexed by Italian Albania (1941–1944) along with western Macedonia and south-eastern Montenegro	Democratic Federal Yugoslavia (1943–1945) Federal People's Republic of Yugoslavia (1945–1963) Socialist Federal Republic of Yugoslavia (1963–1992) Consisted of the Socialist Republics of: Slovenia (1945–1991); Croatia (1945–1991); Bosnia and Herzegovina (1945–1992) Serbia (1945–1992) (included the autonomous provinces of Vojvodina and Kosovo) Montenegro (1945–1992); Macedonia (1945–1991) See also: Free Territory of Trieste (1947–1954)^{h}			Federal Republic of Yugoslavia Consisted of the Republic of Serbia (1992–2006) and Republic of Montenegro (1992–2006) Included Kosovo and Metohija, under UN administration, without control since 1999	State Union of Serbia and Montenegro Included Kosovo, under UN administration	Republic of Serbia Included the autonomous provinces of Vojvodina and Kosovo and Metohija under UN administration	Republic of Kosovo
Metohija	Kingdom of Montenegro (1910–1918) Metohija controlled by Austria-Hungary 1915–1918	State of Slovenes, Croats and Serbs (1918) Kingdom of Serbs, Croats and Slovenes (1918–1929) Kingdom of Yugoslavia (1929–1943) See also: Republic of Prekmurje (1919) Banat, Bačka and Baranja (1918–1919) Free State of Fiume (1920–1924) (1924–1945) Italian province of Zadar (1920–1947)		Mostly annexed by Italian Albania (1941–1944) along with western Macedonia and south-eastern Montenegro	Democratic Federal Yugoslavia (1943–1945) Federal People's Republic of Yugoslavia (1945–1963) Socialist Federal Republic of Yugoslavia (1963–1992) Consisted of the Socialist Republics of: Slovenia (1945–1991); Croatia (1945–1991); Bosnia and Herzegovina (1945–1992) Serbia (1945–1992) (included the autonomous provinces of Vojvodina and Kosovo) Montenegro (1945–1992); Macedonia (1945–1991) See also: Free Territory of Trieste (1947–1954)^{h}			Federal Republic of Yugoslavia Consisted of the Republic of Serbia (1992–2006) and Republic of Montenegro (1992–2006) Included Kosovo and Metohija, under UN administration, without control since 1999	State Union of Serbia and Montenegro Included Kosovo, under UN administration	Republic of Serbia Included the autonomous provinces of Vojvodina and Kosovo and Metohija under UN administration	Republic of Kosovo
Montenegro and Brda	Kingdom of Montenegro (1910–1918) Metohija controlled by Austria-Hungary 1915–1918	State of Slovenes, Croats and Serbs (1918) Kingdom of Serbs, Croats and Slovenes (1918–1929) Kingdom of Yugoslavia (1929–1943) See also: Republic of Prekmurje (1919) Banat, Bačka and Baranja (1918–1919) Free State of Fiume (1920–1924) (1924–1945) Italian province of Zadar (1920–1947)		Protectorate of Montenegro^{f} (1941–1944)	Democratic Federal Yugoslavia (1943–1945) Federal People's Republic of Yugoslavia (1945–1963) Socialist Federal Republic of Yugoslavia (1963–1992) Consisted of the Socialist Republics of: Slovenia (1945–1991); Croatia (1945–1991); Bosnia and Herzegovina (1945–1992) Serbia (1945–1992) (included the autonomous provinces of Vojvodina and Kosovo) Montenegro (1945–1992); Macedonia (1945–1991) See also: Free Territory of Trieste (1947–1954)^{h}			Federal Republic of Yugoslavia Consisted of the Republic of Serbia (1992–2006) and Republic of Montenegro (1992–2006) Included Kosovo and Metohija, under UN administration, without control since 1999	State Union of Serbia and Montenegro Included Kosovo, under UN administration	Montenegro	
Vardar Macedonia	Part of the Kingdom of Serbia (1912–1918)	State of Slovenes, Croats and Serbs (1918) Kingdom of Serbs, Croats and Slovenes (1918–1929) Kingdom of Yugoslavia (1929–1943) See also: Republic of Prekmurje (1919) Banat, Bačka and Baranja (1918–1919) Free State of Fiume (1920–1924) (1924–1945) Italian province of Zadar (1920–1947)		Annexed by the Kingdom of Bulgaria (1941–1944)	Democratic Federal Yugoslavia (1943–1945) Federal People's Republic of Yugoslavia (1945–1963) Socialist Federal Republic of Yugoslavia (1963–1992) Consisted of the Socialist Republics of: Slovenia (1945–1991); Croatia (1945–1991); Bosnia and Herzegovina (1945–1992) Serbia (1945–1992) (included the autonomous provinces of Vojvodina and Kosovo) Montenegro (1945–1992); Macedonia (1945–1991) See also: Free Territory of Trieste (1947–1954)^{h}			Republic of North Macedonia^{g}			
^{a} Prekmurje annexed by Hungary.; ^{b} See also: SAO Kninska Krajina (1990) → SAO Krajina (1990–1991); and SAO Eastern Slavonia, Baranja and Western Syrmia (1990–1991), SAO Western Slavonia (1990–1991) and the Republic of Serbian Krajina (1990–1995), all replaced by the UN Transitional Administration for Eastern Slavonia, Baranja and Western Sirmium (1996–1998).; ^{c} See also: Republic of Bosnia and Herzegovina; Croatian Republic of Herzeg-Bosnia; and the Serbian Autonomous Oblasts (SAOs) of Bosanska Krajina, North-East Bosnia, Romanija and Herzegovina (1991–1992), which all combined to form the Serbian Republic of Bosnia and Herzegovina (1992–1995).; ^{d} Bačka was reannexed by Hungary (1941–1944), while Syrmia was annexed by the Independent State of Croatia (1941–1944).; ^{e} Including North Kosovo. See also: Republic of Užice.; ^{f} Annexed by Italy (1941–1943) and Germany (1943–1944). Smaller part annexed by the Independent State of Croatia (1941–1944).; ^{g} North Macedonia's official and constitutional name was the Republic of Macedonia until 2019. It was known in the United Nations as the former Yugoslav Republic of Macedonia because of a naming dispute with Greece.; ^{h} Free Territory was established in 1947. Its administration was divided into two areas (Zone A) and (Zone B). Free Territory was de facto taken over by Italy and SFRY in 1954.
