= 2012 in Serbia =

- Decades: 1990s; 2000s; 2010s; 2020s
- See also: History of Serbia; Timeline of Serbian history; List of years in Serbia

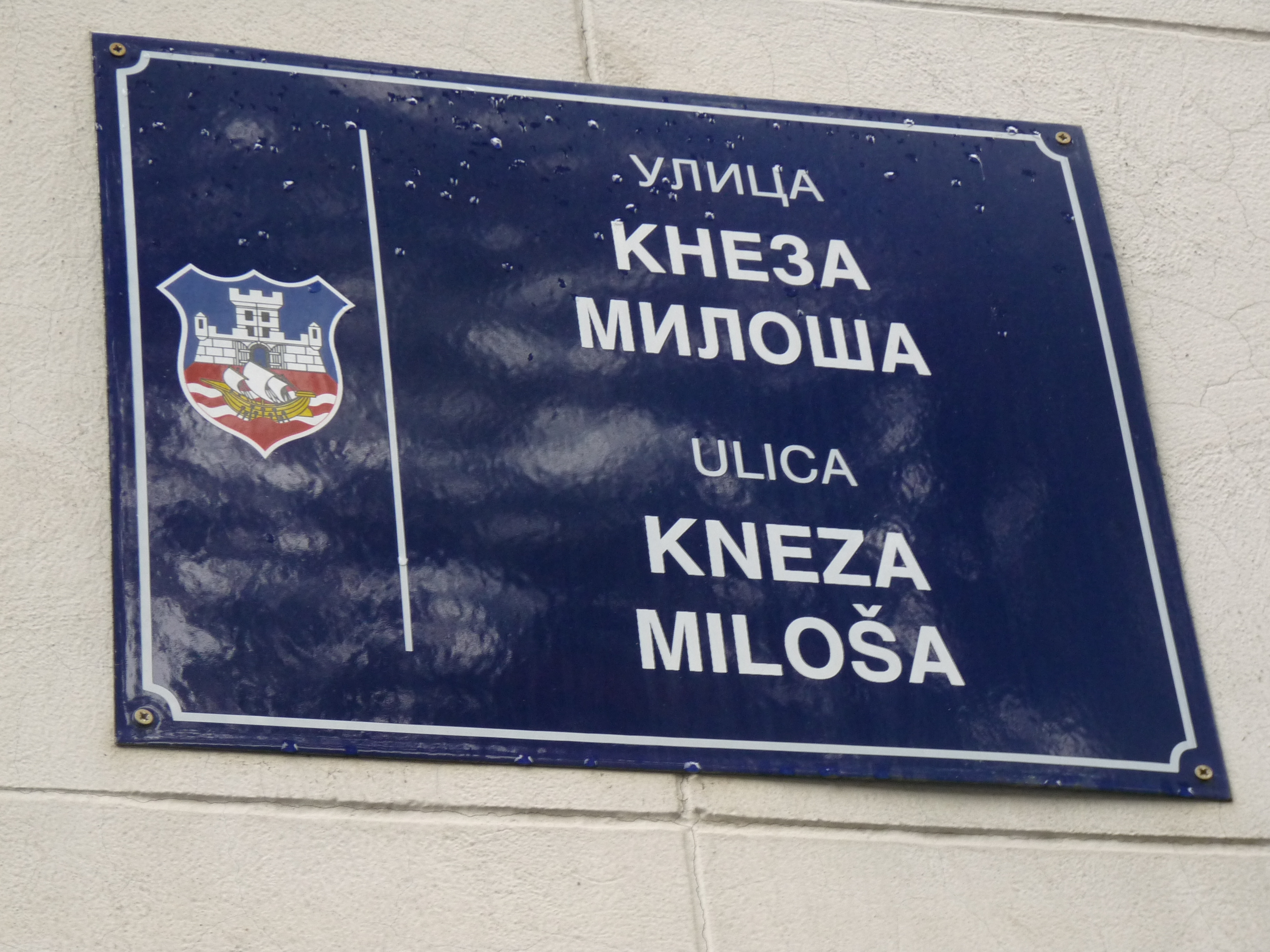
A Serbian street sign in two alphabets on Kneza Miloša Street, Beograd, October 13, 2012.

Events from the year 2012 in Serbia:

== Incumbents ==
- President:
  - until 5 April: Boris Tadić
  - 5 April–31 May: Slavica Đukić Dejanović
  - starting 31 May: Tomislav Nikolić
- Prime Minister: Mirko Cvetković (until 27 July), Ivica Dačić (starting 27 July)

== Architecture ==
- 1 January: Ada Bridge, one of the tallest bridges in Europe, is completed and open to the public in Belgrade, Serbia.

== Events ==
=== January ===
- Romanian Consulate General was founded in Zaječar

=== April ===
- 4 April: Serbian pro-Western President Boris Tadić resigned, paving the way for early presidential election where he will face strong challenge from a nationalist candidate.

=== May ===
- Elections on all levels were held.

== Sports ==
- Serbia participated in 2012 Summer Olympics in London.
- 2011–12 Serbian SuperLiga
- 2012–13 Serbian SuperLiga

== Deaths ==
=== January ===
- 13 January – Miljan Miljanić, 81, Serbian footballer, coach and administrator.
- 29 January – Predrag Dragić, 66, Serbian writer. (Serbian)

=== February ===
- 18 February – Zvezdan Čebinac, 72, Serbian football player and manager.

=== March ===
- 1 March – Blagoje Adžić, 79, Serbian politician. (Serbian)
- 11 March – Miomir Vukobratović, 81, Serbian mechanical engineer.

=== April ===
- 28 April – Milan N. Popović, 87, Serbian psychiatrist and author. (Serbian)

=== May ===
- 5 May – Stevan Bena, 76, Serbian footballer. (Serbian)

=== June ===
- 28 June – Miloš Blagojević, 81, Serbian historian.

=== August ===
- 14 August – Svetozar Gligorić, Serbian chess grandmaster (b. 1923)

=== September ===
- 4 September – Milan Vukelić, 76, Serbian football player.
- 15 September – Predrag Brzaković, 47, Serbian footballer.

=== October ===
- 5 October – Vojin Dimitrijević, 80, Serbian human rights activist.
- 25 October – Olga Jančić, 83, Serbian sculptor.

=== December ===
- 4 December – Branislav Milinković, 52, Serbian diplomat, ambassador to NATO and Austria, suicide by jumping.
- 7 December – Nikola Ilić, 27, Serbian basketball player, cancer.

== See also ==
- 2011 in Serbia
- 2012
