= Banjica forest =

Forest in Belgrade, Serbia

Byford's Forest
- (Serbian: Бајфордова шума Bajfordova šuma)
- IUCN category III (natural monument or feature)
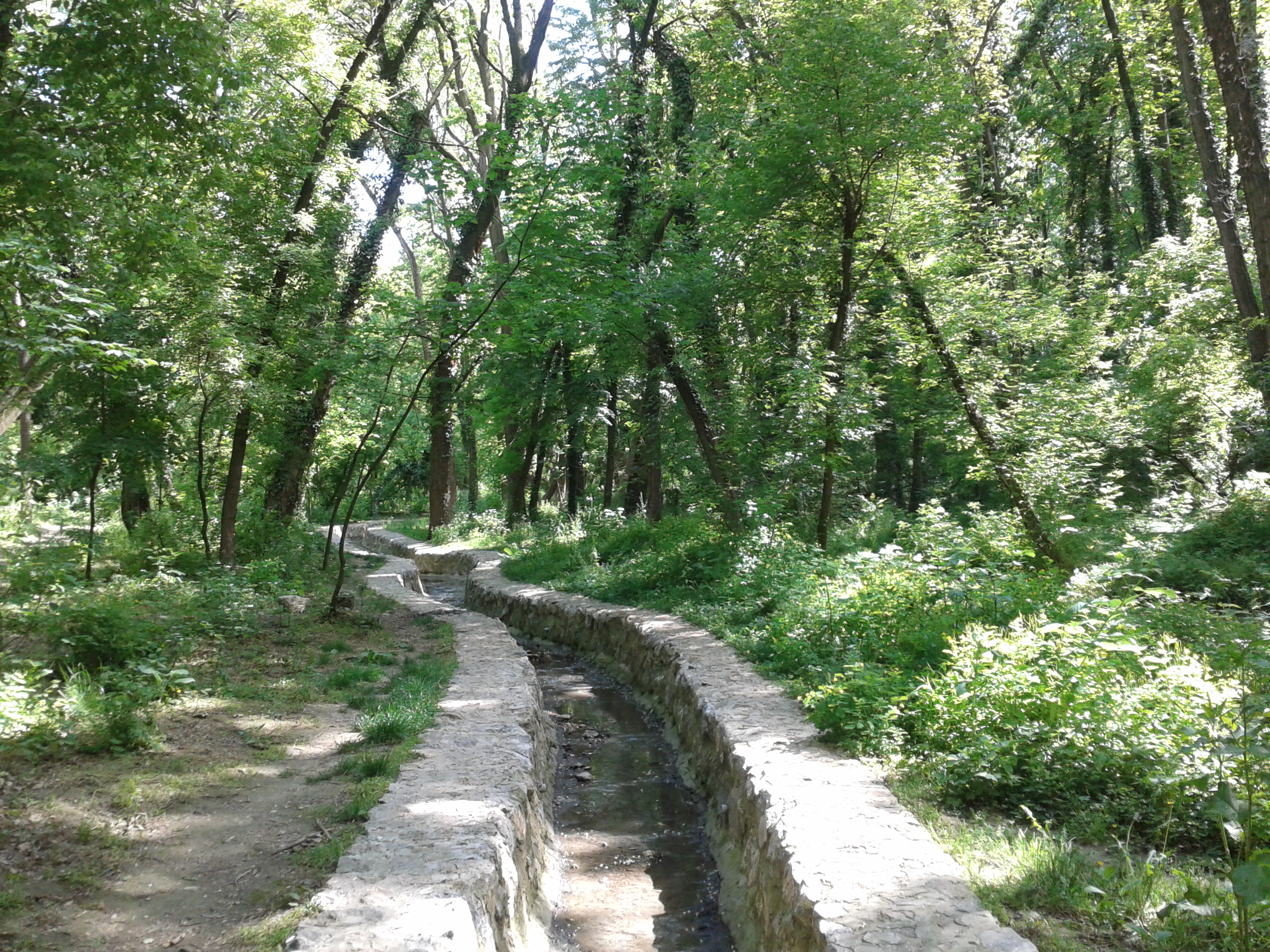
- Stream in the Byford's Forest

- Location within Belgrade
- Location: Voždovac, Belgrade Serbia
- Coordinates: 44°45′58″N 20°28′35″E
- Area: 0.40 km^{2} (0.15 sq mi)
- Established: 15 September 2015

Byford's Forest (Serbian: Бајфордова шума, romanized: Bajfordova šuma) is a forest in Belgrade, Serbia. It is located in the Belgrade's municipality of Voždovac and until 2015 was known as Banjica Forest (Serbian: Бањичка шума, romanized: Banjička šuma), the name still used in news reports.

The forest covers an area of 40 ha (99 acres) and has been under various degrees of protection since 1993.

== Location ==
Byford's Forest is a meridionally elongated wooded area between the Boulevard of the Liberation on the east and the Pavla Jurišića Šturma Street on the west. South and southeast border is marked by the Crnotravska Street. It begins less than 4 km (2.5 mi) away from Terazije, downtown Belgrade. It borders the neighborhoods of Diplomatska Kolonija and Dedinje on the west, Banjica on the southwest and south, Trošarina on the southeast, Voždovac on the east, and Činovnička Kolonija to the north and northeast.

== History ==
Before World War I there was a forest in this area, but was cut down to make room for the vegetable gardens. During the Interbellum, military command built workshops for the repair of the vehicles within the complex of the military auto motorized units of the Royal Yugoslav Army (Serbian: Autokomanda), which gave name to the neighboring square and the neighborhood. Prior to World War II, shooting range was located here.

Banjica concentration camp was established during World War II. German occupational administration originally planned to build it on Ada Ciganlija, but dropped the idea due to the constant flooding of the island, choosing Banjica instead. Formed on 5 July 1941, it was located in the barracks of the 18th Infantry Regiment of the Kingdom of Yugoslavia. First inmates were brought on 9 July 1941, and the last ones left on 4 October 1944. Some 24,000 people passed through the camp, of which 4,200 were murdered.

Banjica stream flowed through the entire area. Its spring was located somewhere in the Suburb of Queen Maria, or modern Upper Voždovac, between the Voždovac Church and present Banjica settlement. In an effort to create the forested belt around the Belgrade, the forest, initially named Banjica Forest, was planted from 1948 to 1950 (Šumice Forest was created as a part of the same project).

On the occasion of the 22 April 2007, the Earth Day, the city government announced its plans for the Banjica forest in 2007, which will include the construction of the trim trail, artificial bed for the forest's stream and placing of bird houses through the forest.

== Name ==
Timothy John Byford, British director, author and educator, who lived in Serbia since 1971, studied birds in the forest, and from 1986 to 1989, collected data on all 68 species. He began an initiative to protect the forest. He died in 2014, before the forest was placed under protection. The Institute for Nature Conservation of Serbia and the Belgrade City Secretariat for Environmental Protection, after a public hearing, declared the forest a natural monument on 15 September 2015. Also, by the same act, the name of the forest was changed to the Byford's Forest.

== Wildlife ==
=== Plant life ===
Most common tree species are pedunculate oak, red maple, silver maple and box elder, but there are many others as well. There are numerous wildflowers on the forest floor, including wood avens, violets, strawberries, garlic mustard, deadnettles etc.

=== Animal life ===
Bird species are very diverse so because of them, Banjica forest is now a natural monument, protected by the state. 68 bird species live in the forest, 40 of which are resident birds, 16 are migratory birds and 12 are passing. The most common breeding birds are nightingale, blackcap, great tit, European magpie, hooded crow, common blackbird, woodpigeon and great spotted woodpecker. Other bird species in the forest include pheasant, common kestrel, Eurasian sparrowhawk, tawny owl and common chaffinch. During the winter, hawks, common buzzards and song thrush also settle in the forest. By the early 2020s, number of species grew to 72, including black woodpecker.

Mammals include Eastern European hedgehog, moles, several species of shrews, various bats, the local brown subspecies of the red squirrel, wood mouse, yellow-necked mouse and least weasel. Altogether, there are 10 species of mammals in the forest, including hares which settled the forest in 2008.

== Characteristics ==
The forest is 2.3 km (1.4 mi) long, up to 300 m (980 ft) wide. It covers an area of 39.61 hectares (97.9 acres).

== Features ==
Map of the Byford's forest

The forest is surrounded by numerous public venues, some along the streets, some in the forest or in its green areas extension, and some right across it. Red Star Stadium is to the north, across the park, while to the northwest is the former Gemax tennis complex. In the northern section of the park are the University of Defense, and the Athletics Hall, while in the central-west part is the complex including Museum of the Banjica concentration camp and Military Academy.

There is also a monument, commemorating the camp's victims. Central part of the Pavla Jurišića Šturma Street's carriageway, for 100 metres (330 ft), is cobblestoned and surrounded by the asphalt concrete. The cobblestoned section was constructed in 1969 as part of the permanent external exhibition of the camp's museum. It marks the "death path", crossed by the captives when they were taken from the camp to the trucks which transported them to the Jajinci execution field.

King Peter I Stadium, home venue of the FK Rad, is located in the southwest zone, while the Military Medical Academy is across it. The south-western corner is occupied by the vast Banjica sports center, with the Banjički Vis Military Base (to the west), Banjica farmers market and Banjica shopping mall (to the south) across the street. Serbian Orthodox Church of the Basil of Ostrog is in the extreme southeast of the forest, at the Trošarina roundabout.

The Lukoil gas station, Best Western Hotel "M", and the large Kovač building materials depot occupy the central-east part of the forest, along the boulevard. University of Belgrade Faculty of Organizational Sciences is across the boulevard, to the northeast.

As in the spring of 2011, the main forest path (going along the length of the forest) has a form of a functional trim trail, while the smaller paths are left in their natural state. Some old trees were cut and timber was cut in smaller pieces and left at the spot, attracting insects and insect-eating birds. Benches and wooden wastebaskets are placed periodically along the trim trail, while there are also several well-spaced spots with information tables and multiple benches under wooden roofs, intended for rest of several families. There are a wooden and a stone-based bridge over the widest parts of the stream, as well as several plank bridges over the narrowest parts. Bird houses are placed all over the forest.

== Gallery ==
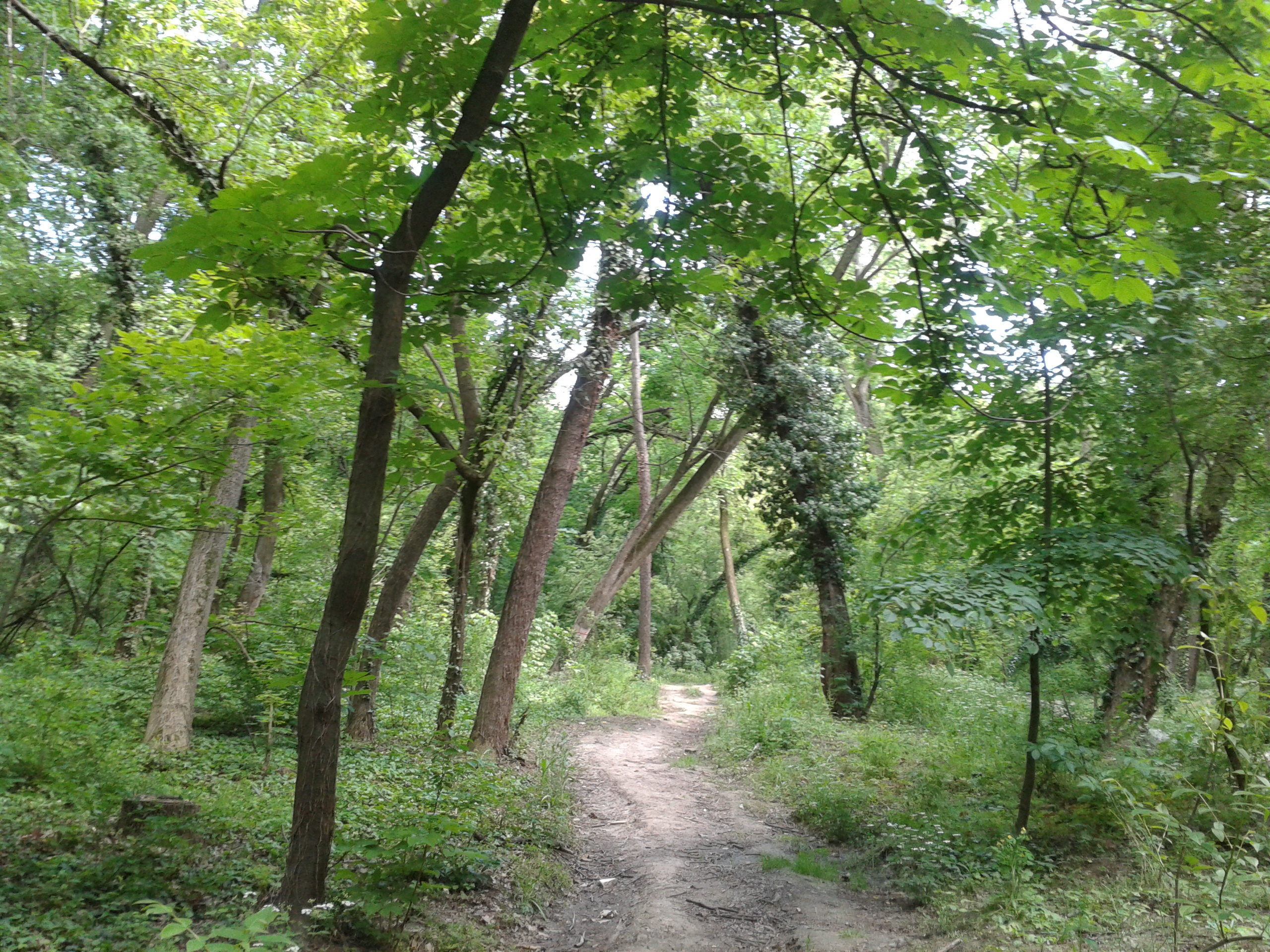

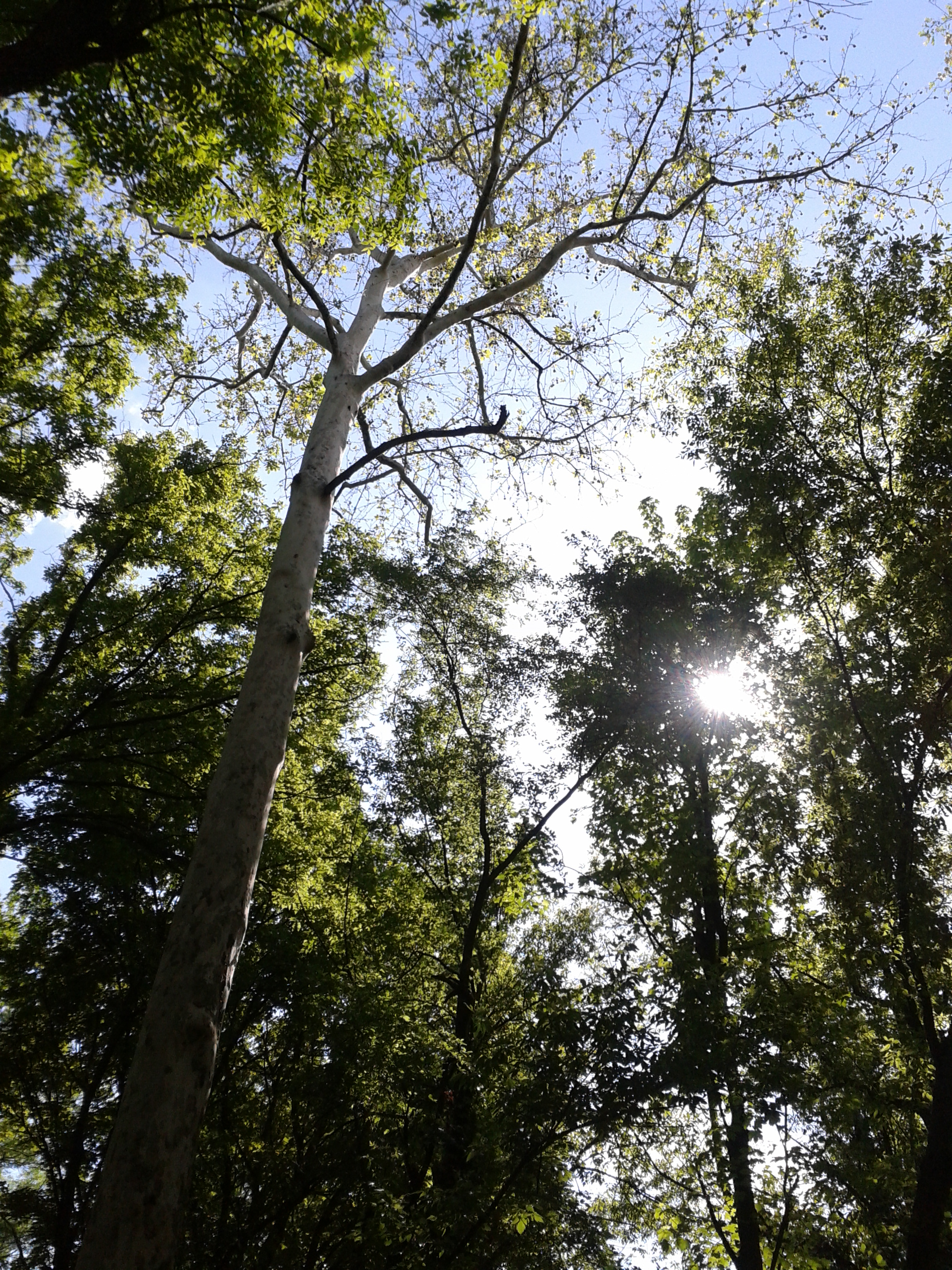

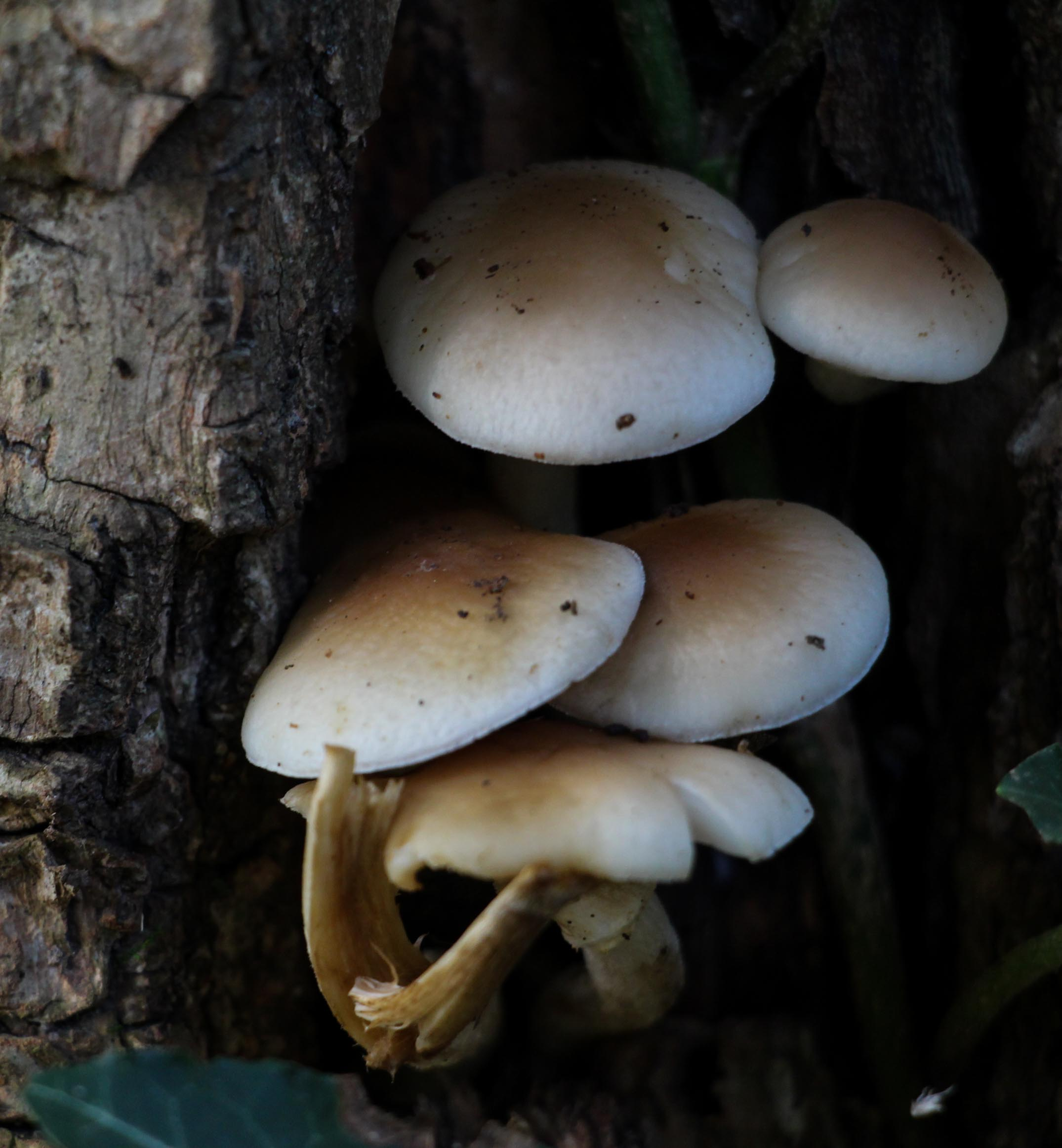

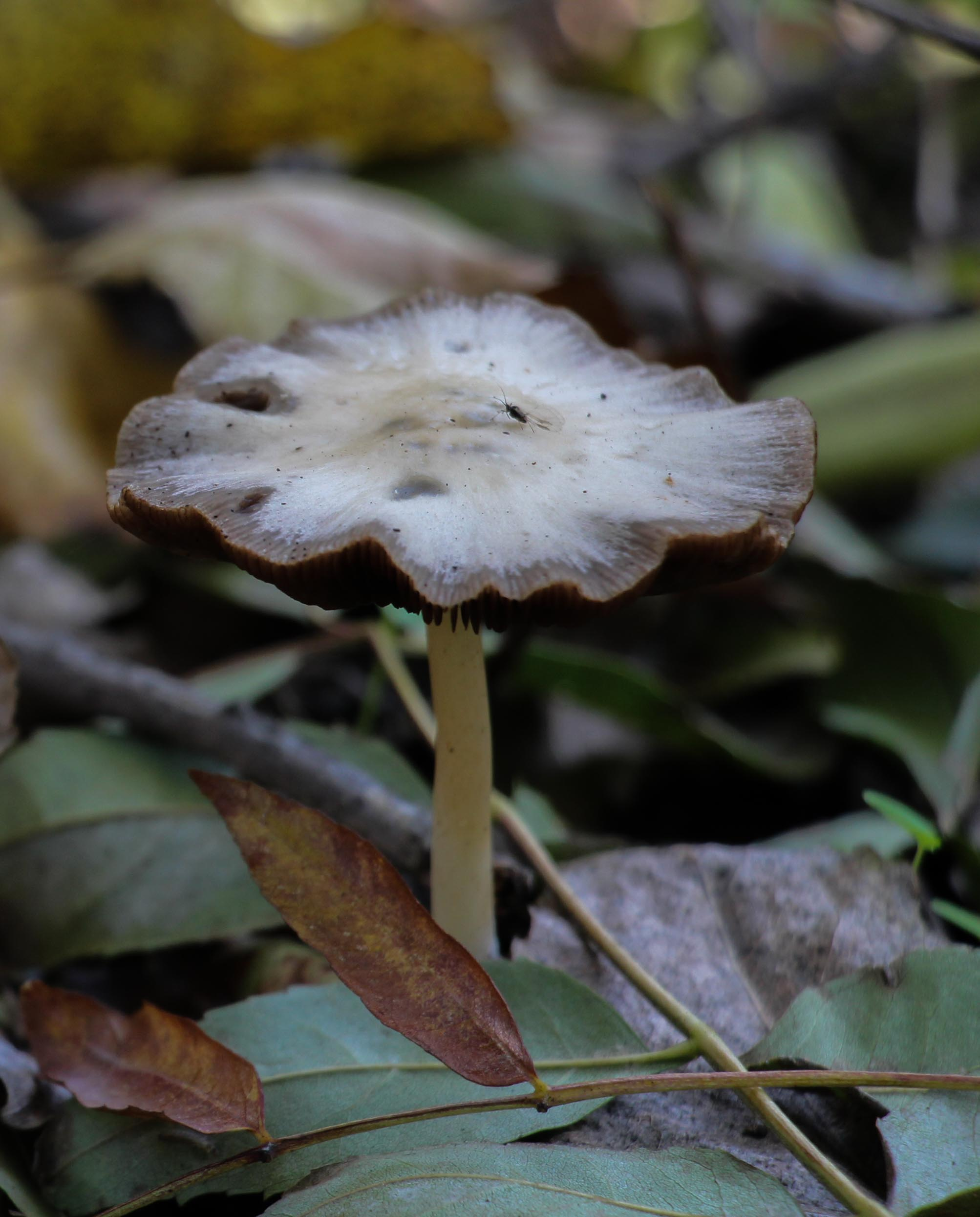

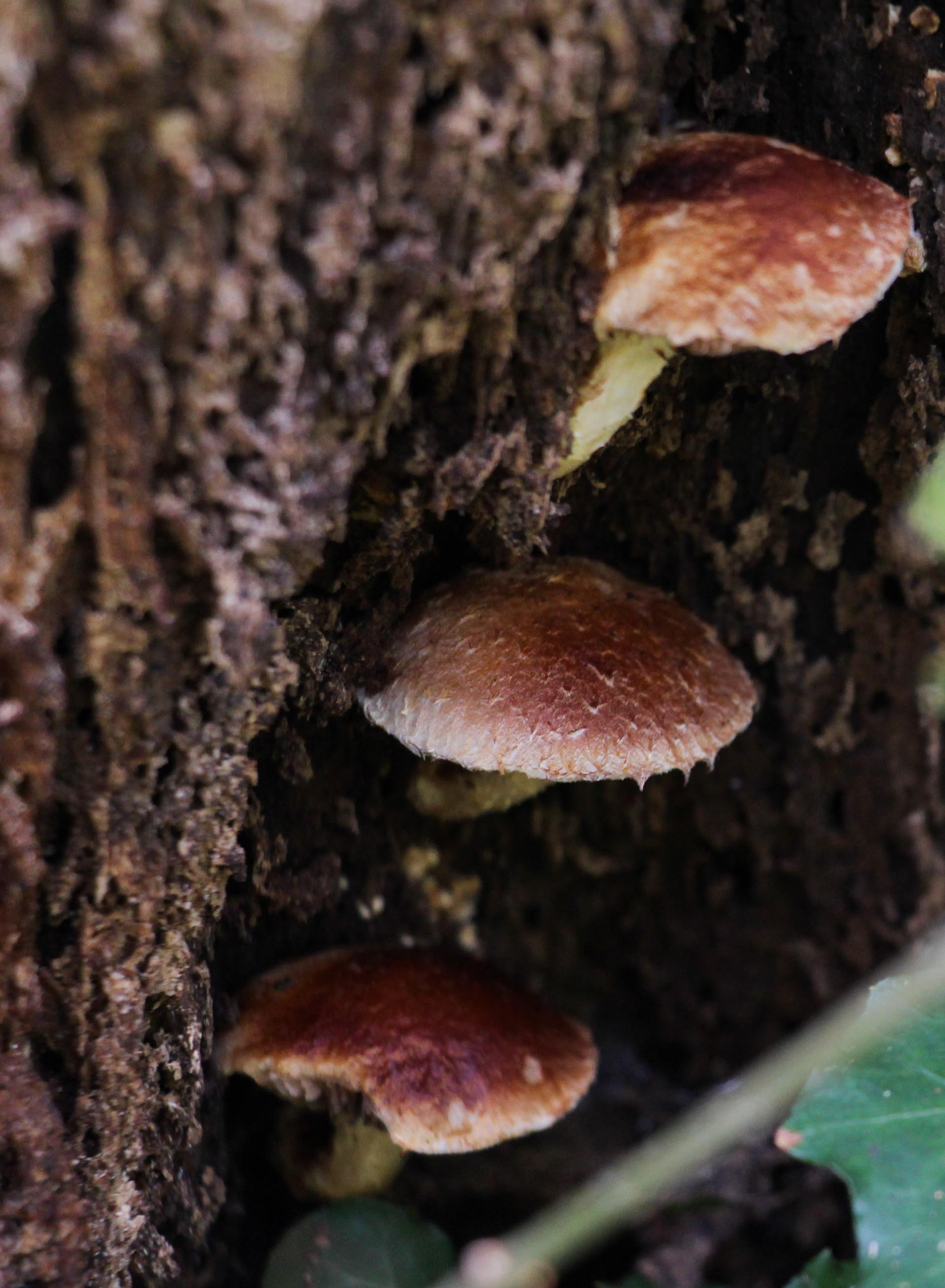

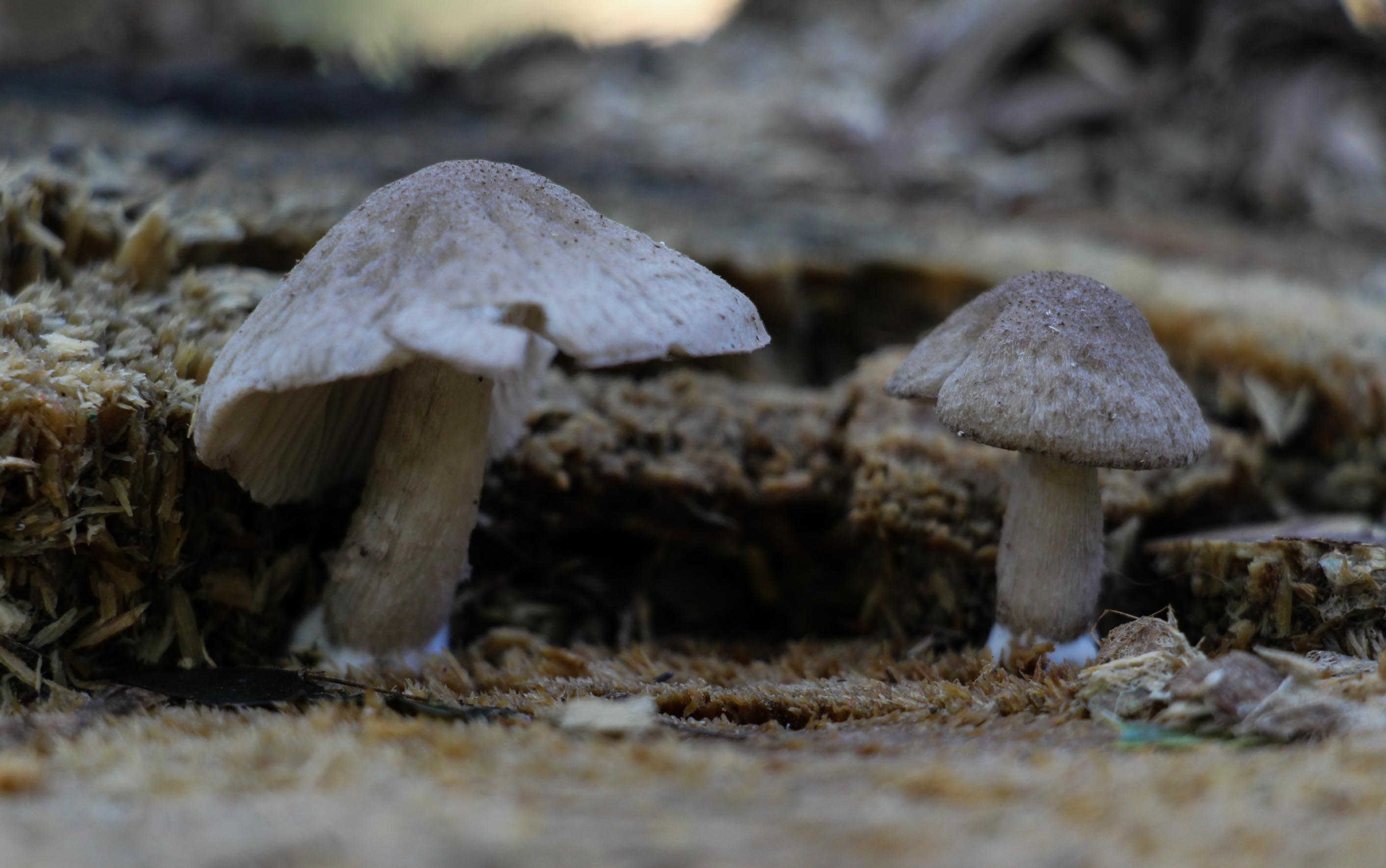

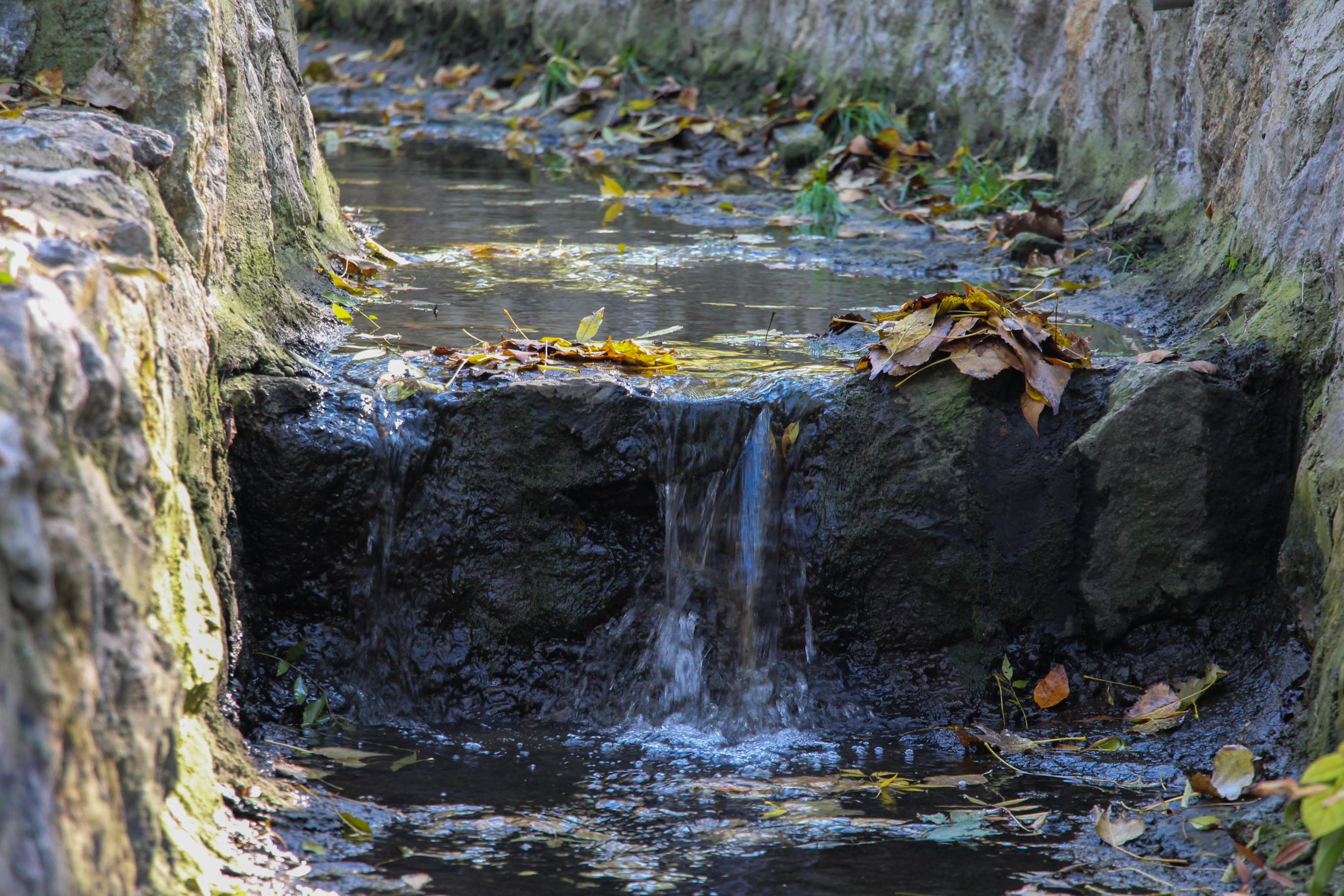

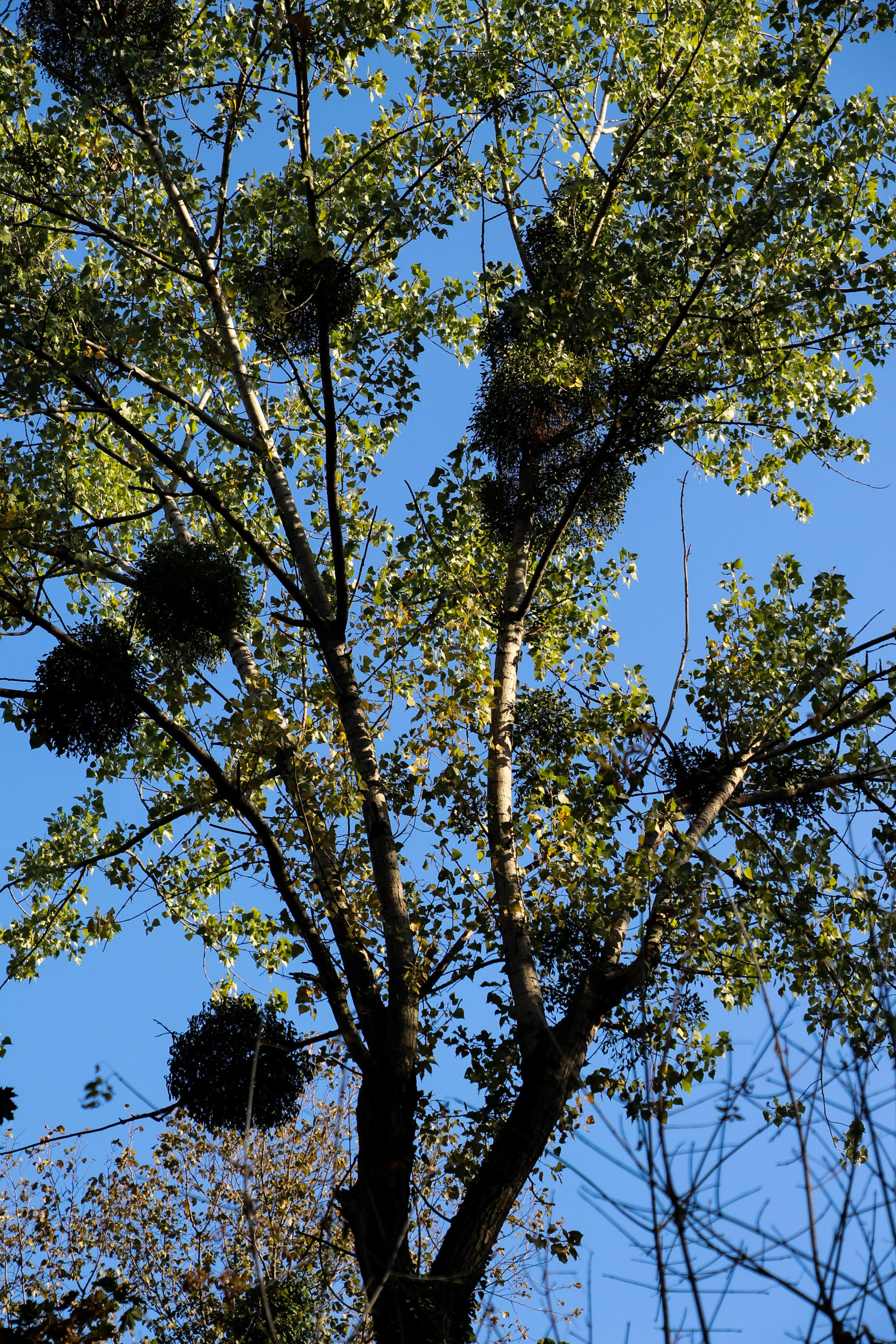
