= 2011 in Serbia =

- Decades: 1990s; 2000s; 2010s; 2020s
- See also: History of Serbia; Timeline of Serbian history; List of years in Serbia

Events in the year 2011 in Serbia.

== Incumbents ==
- President: Boris Tadić
- Prime Minister: Mirko Cvetković

== Events ==
- 2011 Serbian census took place.

=== January ===
- Bosniak Academy of Sciences and Arts was founded in Sarajevo, Bosnia and Herzegovina and Sandžak

=== April ===
- April 4: Serbian pro-Western President Boris Tadić resigned, paving the way for early presidential election where he will face strong challenge from a nationalist candidate.

=== May ===
- May 26: Ratko Mladić, the war crimes fugitive accused of orchestrating the Siege of Sarajevo and the Srebrenica massacre, has been arrested in Serbia.

=== July ===
- July 20: Goran Hadžić is detained in Serbia, becoming the last of 161 people indicted by the International Criminal Tribunal for the former Yugoslavia.
- July 25 - North Kosovo crisis started on Kosovo.

=== December ===
- Paul Karađorđević, prince and regent of the Kingdom of Yugoslavia was rehabilitated.

== Arts and entertainment ==
In music: Serbia in the Eurovision Song Contest 2011.

== Sports ==
Football (soccer) competitions: Serbian SuperLiga, Serbian Cup.

- 2011 UEFA European Under-17 Football Championship
- EuroBelgrade, a student sports event organized by the University of Belgrade, was held for the first time.

== Deaths ==
=== January ===
- January 10 – Bora Kostić, 80, Serbian footballer (Red Star Belgrade).
- January 23 – Novica Tadić, 62, Yugoslavian poet.

=== March ===
- March 23 – Živorad Kovačević, 80, Serbian diplomat.

=== April ===
- April 12 – Aleksandar Petaković, 81, Serbian football player. (Serbian)
