= 2014 in Serbia =

- Decades: 1990s; 2000s; 2010s; 2020s
- See also: Other events of 2014; List of years in Serbia

The following lists events that happened during 2014 in Serbia.

== Incumbents ==
- President: Tomislav Nikolić
- Prime Minister: Ivica Dačić (until 27 April), Aleksandar Vučić (starting 27 April)

== Events ==
=== March ===
- March 16 – Serbian parliamentary election, 2014. Voters in Serbia go to the polls for an early parliamentary election. The centre-right SNS is reported to be receiving around 50% of the popular vote.
- March 16 – Belgrade local election, 2014

=== May ===
- May 13–19 – 2014 Southeast Europe floods. 57 deaths in Serbia.

=== August ===
- August 29 – Orlovac incident.

=== October ===
- On October 16, 2014, a military parade by the Serbian Army was held in front of more than 100,000 spectators for the 70th anniversary of the Soviet Red Army liberating city of Belgrade from Nazi Germany. The parade was also part of Russian president Vladimir Putin's official visit. Besides Putin who was the parade's centerpiece guest, the main stand featured Serbian dignitaries, president Tomislav Nikolić and prime minister Aleksandar Vučić as well as Republika Srpska president Milorad Dodik and Republika Srpska prime minister Željka Cvijanović.

== Building projects ==
- Pupinov Bridge finished in December 2014.
- Airport City Belgrade underway since April 2009.
- Belgrade bypass underway since 2005.
- Belgrade Waterfront initiated in early 2014.

== Sport ==
=== Football ===
- Serbia v Albania (UEFA Euro 2016 qualifying) - the match was interrupted and ultimately cancelled after several instances of hooliganism from both sides, including Serbian fans chanting "Death to Albanians", throwing flares and other objects onto the pitch, and a drone flying an Albanian nationalist banner over the field.

=== Basketball ===
- 2013–14 Basketball League of Serbia: Season winners were KK FMP
- 2013–14 Radivoj Korać Cup: Winners were KK Crvena Zvezda
- 2014 FIBA Europe Under-20 Championship Bronze
- 2014 FIBA Under-17 World Championship Bronze
- 2014 FIBA Basketball World Cup Silver

=== Water polo ===
- 2014 FINA Men's Water Polo World League Champions
- 2014 Men's European Water Polo Championship Champions
- 2013–14 Prva A liga (men's water polo): Winners were VK Crvena Zvezda

=== Tennis ===
- Novak Djokovic tennis season: Runner-up at 2014 French Open – Men's Singles. Lost against Rafael Nadal.
- Novak Djokovic tennis season: Winner at 2014 Wimbledon Championships – Men's Singles. Won against Roger Federer.

=== Olympics ===
- Serbia at the 2014 Winter Olympics
- Serbia at the 2014 Summer Youth Olympics

=== Paralympics ===
- Serbia at the 2014 Winter Paralympics

== Deaths ==
- Uroš Marović
- Olga Jevrić
- Nenad Lukić
- Đoko Rosić
- Gašo Knežević
- Jovan Pavlović
- Svetlana Velmar-Janković
- Jovan Krkobabić
- Ilija Ničić
- Timothy John Byford
- Miodrag Rakić
- Dobrica Ćosić
- Dragoljub Velimirović
- Miodrag Radulovacki
- Ivica Brzić
- Bora Todorović
- Petar Nikezić
- Tijana Jurić
- Željko Đurđić
- Dragoljub Čirić
- Miodrag Pavlović
- Sava Stojkov
- Mile Kos
- Joakim Vislavski
- Zoran Knežević
- Milan Galić
- Nenad Manojlović
- Ilija Pantelić
- Jovan Ćirilov
- Nikola Simić (actor)
- Ivan Stojmenović
- Veljko Kadijević
