= Činovnička Kolonija =

Činovnička Kolonija Чиновнича колонија
- Urban neighborhood
- Etymology: Clerks' Colony
- Location within Belgrade
- Coordinates: 44.781892°N 20.469302°E
- Country: Serbia
- Region: Belgrade
- Municipality: Voždovac
- Local community: Činovnička Kolonija
- Established: 1930

Population (2011)
  - Total: 3,867
- Time zone: UTC+1 (CET)
  - Summer (DST): UTC+2 (CEST)
- Area code: +381(0)11
- Car plates: BG

Činovnička Kolonija (Serbian: Чиновничка колонија, meaning "Clerks' Colony") is an urban neighborhood of Belgrade, the capital of Serbia. It is part of the Voždovac municipality and is a sub-neighborhood of the neighborhood of Voždovac itself. Built in 1930, it was one of the earliest planned neighborhoods of Belgrade.

== Location ==
The neighborhood occupies the northwestern section of Voždovac municipality. It is delineated by the elementary school "Karađorđe" to the north, Voždovac Church to the south and by two major city streets, Kumodraška to the east and the Liberation Boulevard to the west. Činovnička Kolonija borders the neighborhood of Autokomanda in the north, Dušanovac in the northeast, Voždovac in the east, Byford's Forest in the southeast and Dedinje, Diplomatska Kolonija and Stadion in the east.

== History ==
=== Origin ===
After the liberation in World War I in 1918, Voždovac was placed under the Belgrade's administrative rule. Despite economic hardships caused by the war, the growth of population in Belgrade experienced a boom. As much of the city was devastated, this resulted in very high rents. In order to alleviate this problem for their profession, both state and privately employed clerks formed the Clerks Housing Cooperative.

In 1928, the cooperative purchased from the Belgrade municipality a vast lot of completely non-urbanized section of the Queen Maria's Suburb. Named after the dowager queen Maria of Yugoslavia, the inhabitants colloquially began to use the name Voždovac which spread and was adopted as the official name.

The large lot was located along the left side of Avala road, which was in this section called the Šumadija road and today is called the Boulevard of Liberation. It occupied the area between the Voždovac Church and the football stadium of SK Jugoslavija.

=== Design and construction ===
The Cooperative founders originally envisioned the settlement which would consist of several blocks of modern buildings, surrounded by the parks. This was quite popular at the time in the large European cities. The buildings was planned as the neatly packed, monumental edifices in the centers of large parks, with addition of "all technical facilities which will contribute to the coziness of dwelling". However, the members had different opinion so in the end it was decided to build small, individual residential houses. The land was divided in 299 smaller lots on which the settlement was built and the parceling plan was drafted in 1929. The area of the lots was from 4 to 6 a (4,300 to 6,500 sq ft)

The parceling plan was work of Đorđe Kovaljevski. It envisioned the formation of 10 residential blocks with houses and 2 smaller block for public usage. One was planned for the open green market and the other for the building of the Cooperative, park and children playground. The building of the Cooperative was projected as the center of the settlement's public life, including the ballroom, cinema and a library. A square was also planned at the entry into the neighborhood, but neither the building nor the square have been built in the end.

The settlement in general was designed by the Czech émigré architect Jan Dubovy as a neighborhood of the residential family houses and villas with yards and green belts in between. Dubovy, in turn, based it on the garden city ideas of Ebenezer Howard. Other architects who contributed to the planning were Milan Zloković, who worked on the typified houses, and Branislav Kojić. But, out of almost 300 houses, over 200 were projected by the Russian architect Valery Stashevsky and his bureau.

Each proprietor was free to choose an architect, but some of the basic guidelines set by Dubovy had to be followed: hipped roofs (folded into the pagoda style), green exterior shutters (either wooden or metallic), windows with ventilation dividers (šprosna), access staircase (bordered by the low bricked wall) to the entry doors, etc. As Dubovy was a staunch Modernist, general request was also not to place figures, pilasters, ornamental garlands and other classical decorative elements. The base of the houses were set at 120 to 150 m^{2} (1,300 to 1,600 sq ft).

Construction began in September 1930. Though the houses were considered villas, because of the economic crisis and the social and financial abilities of the investors, the projected houses are very simple and humble in architectural sense, but functional. For the most part they have no ornaments, but have protruded eaves and hipped roofs, mimicking the folk type of construction, especially of the ground-floor houses. Because of the "green city" ideas in the project, the houses are a bit away from the streets and from each other, so that they can be surrounded by the green areas and forested yards.

Initially, only one house was granted a permit to be higher than the others. The house was owned by Milorad Šoškić, a chief inspector in the Ministry of Education. Special permit was granted by the city administration, after Dubovy allowed it. He did so because the house was located almost in the geometrical center of the neighborhood and due to lighthouse appearance of its tower. It was projected by the Russian émigré architect Boris Fesenkov.

=== Later developments ===
In the 1980s began the upgrading of the villas, with annexes and upper floors being added. In July 1991 the neighborhood was placed under the preliminary protection, because some of the most important architects were behind the concept of Činovnička Kolonija and "because the establishment of the settlement was planned with unique urban concept". By this time, only 83 houses remained intact appearance since the 1930s. However, this status was revoked in 1994.

Because of the economic meltdown which followed the collapse of Yugoslavia and the ensuing wars, many of the old owners sold their houses. The investors began constructing new buildings, in different styles, which though formally have only one floor, are towering the old houses as the investors are not abiding either to the law or the projects and build whatever they want. Also, in order to obtain the largest possible floor area, the entire lots are urbanized so the gardens and yards are being destroyed. This way, the modern settlement is completely opposite to what was originally envisioned in the 1930s. By 2007 less than 50 original houses remained.

== Administration ==
Historical population
Year	Pop.	±% p.a.
1981	5,052	—
1991	4,900	−0.31%
2002	4,294	−1.19%
2011	3,867	−1.16%

The original name of the settlement was Činovničko naselje "Voždovac" (Clerks settlement "Voždovac") but was later renamed to Činovnička Kolonija.

Činovnička Kolonija is organized as a local community, a sub-municipal administrative unit within Voždovac. The local community was officially named "Dr Nenad Parenta" in the censuses of 1981 and 1991, and then it was named after the neighborhood. According to the last census of 2011, it had a population of 3,867.

== Characteristics ==
The settlement remains predominantly residential. The eastern section, along the right side of the Vojvode Stepe Street is occupied by the taller buildings from a later period. In some of the newly upgraded buildings there are small clinics and hotels. The Twelfth Belgrade Gymnasium is located in the neighborhood. The endowment of physicist Đorđe Živanović is in situated in his house in Činovnička Kolonija. Venues and facilities in the vicinity of the neighborhood include the Faculty of Organizational Sciences, the Red Star's Rajko Mitić Stadium and the memorial of the Topovske Šupe concentration camp.

In the southeast corner of the neighborhood, north of the church and elongated along the Vojvode Stepe Street, is the Voždovac Park. It covers 1.94 hectares (4.8 acres).

== See also ==
- Voždovac
