= 2013 in Serbia =

- Decades: 1990s; 2000s; 2010s; 2020s
- See also: Other events of 2013; List of years in Serbia

The following lists events that happened during 2013 in the Republic of Serbia.

== Incumbents ==
- President: Tomislav Nikolić
- Prime Minister: Ivica Dačić

== Events ==
=== April ===
- 9 April - 13 people are killed and one is injured after a man goes on a shooting spree in the village of Velika Ivanča.
- 13 April - Brussels Agreement which normalized Kosovo-Serbia relations is signed

=== October ===
- 20 October - Jovanka Broz, the widow of Josip Broz Tito (lifelong president of Yugoslavia) died in Belgrade.
