= EuroBelgrade =

EuroBelgrade was an international student sports multi-sport tournament that took place in Belgrade in Serbia. It was hosted by the Faculty of Organizational Sciences from Belgrade and supported by the entire University of Belgrade. During the tournament, students had the opportunity to play futsal, volleyball, basketball, waterpolo, table tennis, compete in cheerleading, and visit Belgrade.

== Tournament ==
All sport events were played in a building complex in a Kosutnjak forest.

This three-day tournament belonged to a series of the "Euro" tournaments, which included EuroMilano and EuroBarcelona. All sports, except waterpolo, were played in the men's and women's competition.

The first EuroBelgrade tournament was held from 14 to 17 October 2011. Even though the EuroBelgrade was organized for the first time, the tournament was a big success. There were over 250 foreign and 300 domestic students participating. The second EuroBelgrade was scheduled for 11 to 15 October 2012. The EuroBelgrade 2015 was cancelled.
