= Olga Jančić =

Serbian sculptor

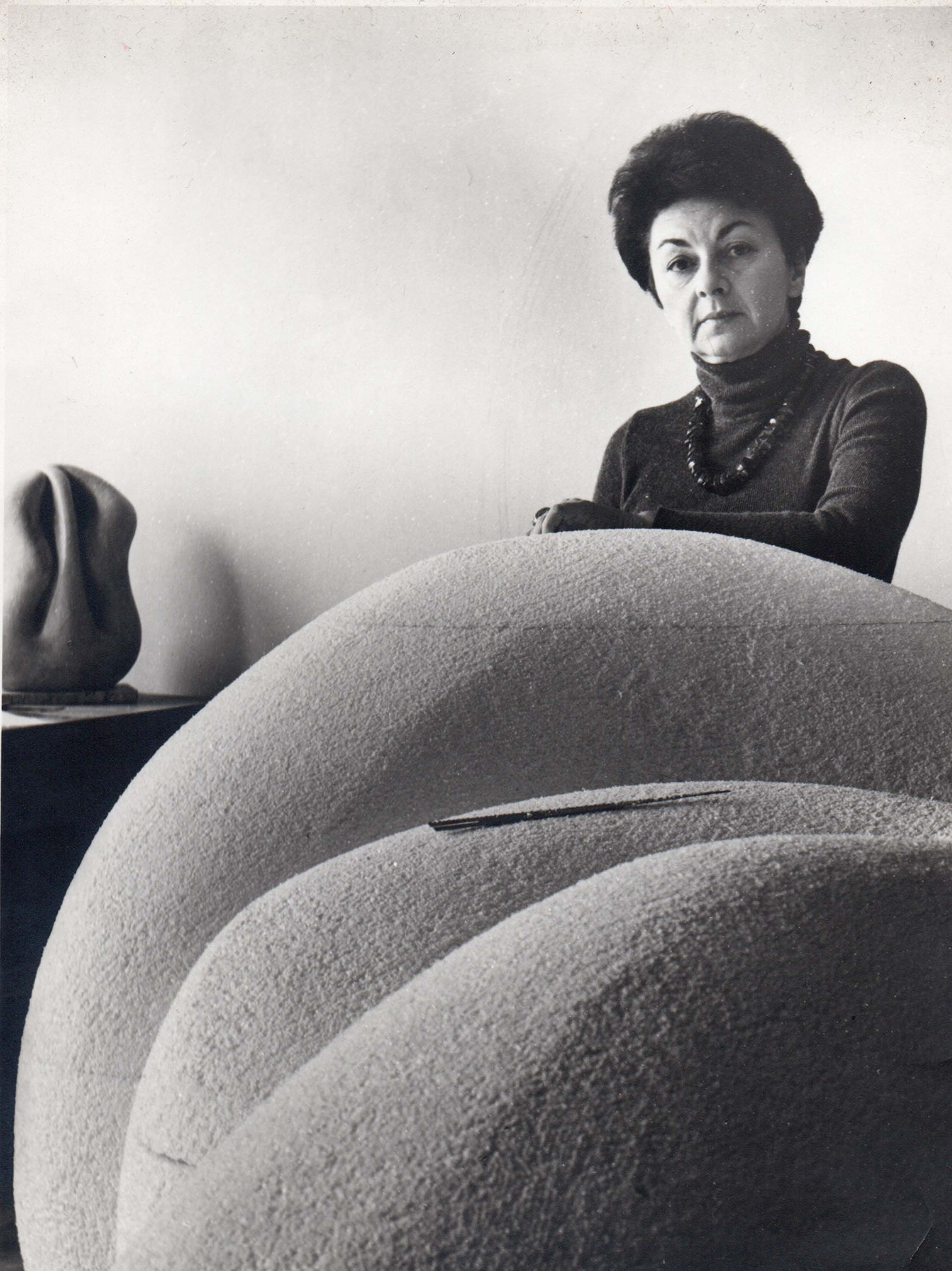
- Born: 1 February 1929; Bitola, North Macedonia (then Yugoslavia)
- Died: 25 October 2012 (aged 83); Belgrade, Serbia

Olga Jančić (Олга Јанчић; 1 February 1929, in Bitola, Yugoslavia (modern North Macedonia)– 25 October 2012, in Belgrade, Serbia) was a Serbian sculptor.
