= Banjički Vis Military Base =

- IATA: none; ICAO: LYBV

Summary
- Airport type: Military
- Owner: Military of Serbia
- Operator: Serbian Air Force
- Serves: VMA - Vojnomedicinska akademija (Military Medical Academy)
- Location: Belgrade, Serbia
- Elevation AMSL: 584 ft / 178 m
- Coordinates: 44°45′44.28″N 20°28′17.04″E

Map

Helipads
| Number | Length | | Surface |
| Number | ft | m | Surface |
|---|---|---|---|
| H1 | 130 (radius) | 40 (radius) | Asphalt |
| H2 | 130 (radius) | 40 (radius) | Asphalt |

Banjički Vis Military Base (Serbian: Аеробаза Бањички Вис / Aerobaza Banjički Vis) (ICAO: LYBV) is a heliport located on Banjica hill about 5 kilometres (3 miles) south of downtown Belgrade (Terazije). In 2019 a facility was built at the site to house aircrew, medical staff and military passengers. Work was also carried out to install lighting to allow night time operations.
