= Rehabilitation in Serbia =

Rehabilitation in Serbia refers to the rehabilitation of people convicted during the Communist Yugoslavian period in Serbia.

== Notable rehabilitated people ==
=== 2007 ===
- Radule Božović - Serbian Orthodox priest executed in 1945 for being a member of the Chetnik movement
- Slobodan Jovanović - member of the Kingdom of Yugoslavia's government in exile
- Blagoje Krušić - World War I soldier, executed for collaboration with Chetniks in World War II
- Dragoslav Mihailović - writer
- Mihailo Milovanović - painter
- Dimitrije Mladenović - Mayor of Pirot
- Momčilo Ninčić - minister of foreign affairs in the Kingdom of Yugoslavia's government in exile

=== 2008 ===
- Grigorije Božović - reporter
- Đoka Dunđerski - wealthy industrialist whose wealth was confiscated
- Dragoslav Stojanović - reporter who worked on Serbian newspaper Nove vreme during World War II
- Dragoslav Marjanović and Miodrag Vesić - convicted as members of the Chetnik movement in 1956

=== 2009 ===
- Dragiša Cvetković - prime minister of the Kingdom of Yugoslavia
- Veljko Guberina - lawyer

=== 2011 ===
- Paul Karađorđević - prince and regent of the Kingdom of Yugoslavia

=== 2012 ===
- Milan Antić - minister for the Royal Court
- Momčilo Janković - minister in the Government of National Salvation

=== 2013 ===
- Tomislav Karađorđević - prince of the Kingdom of Yugoslavia
- Velisav Petrović - president of the municipality of Divci murdered by Partisans in 1941
- 113 German civilians from Odžaci killed in 1944

=== 2014 ===
- Radoslav Grujić - professor at Belgrade's Faculty of Theology
- Andrej Karađorđević - prince of the Kingdom of Yugoslavia
- Marija Karađorđević - queen of the Kingdom of Yugoslavia

=== 2015 ===
- Alexander, Crown Prince of Yugoslavia - crown prince of Serbia
- Peter II of Yugoslavia - King of Yugoslavia
- Draža Mihailović - general and Chetnik leader
