= Branislav Milinković =

Serbian political activist and diplomat

Branislav Milinković (9 July 1961 – 4 December 2012) was a Serbian political activist and diplomat. He was Serbia's NATO ambassador when he killed himself.

== Career ==
Milinkovic worked for a prominent Yugoslav foreign policy think-tank. In late 1980s, Milinkovic joined other liberals who opposed the government of Slobodan Milosevic in the 90s. He established close ties with international human rights and other groups and remained active in anti-war groups.

In 2000, Milinkovic was appointed Serbia's ambassador to the Organization for Security and Co-Operation in Europe, or OSCE, in Vienna.

He was transferred to NATO as Serbia's special representative in 2004. He became ambassador to NATO in 2009, helping improve relations still strained by NATO's 1999 bombing campaign against Serbia.

== Personal life ==
Milinkovic married fellow diplomat, who was based in Vienna, in 1993. They have one son.

Milinkovic was well liked by his colleagues.

== Death ==
Milinković fell to his death from a parking lot at Brussels airport, after meeting a diplomatic delegation. Brussels authorities confirmed that his death was a suicide, and his wife later made a statement saying he did not wish to keep on living due to an unspecified serious illness. Both NATO and Serbian sources said his death was unexpected.
