= Murder of Tijana Jurić =

2014 child murder in Serbia

Tijana Jurić
- Born: 4 May 1999; Subotica, FR Yugoslavia
- Died: 26 July 2014 (aged 15); Bajmok, Serbia
- Cause of death: Strangulation
- Body discovered: 7 August 2014
- Height: 1.72 m (5 ft 8 in)
- Parent(s): Igor and Mirjana Jurić

Tijana Jurić (Serbian Cyrillic: Тијана Јурић; 4 May 1999 – 26 July 2014) was a 15 year old Serbian girl from Subotica, who was kidnapped and murdered in the night between the 25 and 26 of July 2014, near the village of Bajmok. She was seen for the last time 25 minutes after midnight, near the sports-center "Rata" in Bajmok, while her body was found 12 days later, on August 7, on a neglected dump in Čonoplja in the municipality of Sombor. Dragan Đurić has been found guilty for murder and sentenced to 40 years in prison.

== Disappearance ==
Tijana Jurić enrolled in music high school, majoring in cello and ethnomusicology. At the entrance exam, necessary for enrollment in this type of high school, she achieved the maximum number of points. She attended elementary music school for ten years, during which she won six awards at international and national competitions in this field.

Tijana disappeared in the night between 25 and 26 of July 2014, near the village of Bajmok in northern Serbia. The fifteen-year-old returned from the seaside that day, 25 July, at around 4 pm, where she was on vacation. Her grandparents on her mother's side lived in Bajmok. The same evening, she went by train to Bajmok to meet her friends. She was wearing a white t-shirt, bright jeans and white Converse All Stars sneakers.

Arriving at the village from her native Subotica, she called her mother by phone. She went to the "Stevan Vitković Riba" indoor soccer tournament, which was held annually in the Bajmok hamlet of Rata. She spent the whole evening with friends. Around midnight, she went home, in the company of a girl and a boy. In the middle of the road, Jurić decided to go back to Rata, to return the sweatshirt she had borrowed the other night (even though she had her sweater), and she went back to the Sports Center "Rata".

According to the reconstruction presented by her father Igor Jurić, Tijana, returning alone on the same road, walked down JNA Street. On the corner of Tri istarske žrtve and Njegoševa streets, she met her friends about half an hour after midnight. When asked where she was going, she replied that she was going to return the borrowed sweatshirt. She continued down the street Tri istarske žrtve, crossed the railway and took the dirt road that leads to the sports field where a friend was waiting for her, whose sweatshirt she had borrowed. As she did not come for a long time, a friend from the field went to meet her. Tijana, however, was not there, and on the dirt road, about a hundred meters away, he found white Converse sneaker. It has been estimated that a maximum of seven minutes elapsed between the time she was last seen and the time her sneaker was found.

== See also ==
- List of kidnappings
- List of solved missing person cases (post-2000)
