= Timothy John Byford =

English-Serbian actor and director (1941–2014)

Timothy John Byford (Serbian: Тимоти Џон Бајфорд/Timoti Džon Bajford; 25 July 1941 – 5 May 2014) was an author, film director, translator, and educator.

Byford was born in England, but spent most of his life in Belgrade. He became a naturalized citizen of Serbia in 2004. He directed children's television programmes, first in the UK for the BBC, and later in Yugoslavia, for TV Belgrade and TV Sarajevo. His children's TV series enjoyed great success in former Yugoslavia, and continue to be popular.

== Biography ==
Born in Salisbury, Wiltshire, Byford started his TV career directing films for the BBC Blue Peter programme. His first TV documentary "I Want to Be a Showjumper" won a BAFTA Harlequin "Rediffusion Star Award" (for Children's Programmes) in 1970.

In 1971 he moved to Yugoslavia, where he married and continued to write and direct children's television programmes during the 1970s and 1980s. He is best known for his children's TV series: Neven ('Marigold'), Babino unuče ('Granny's Boy') and Poletarac ('Fledgling'), all for TV Belgrade, as well as Nedeljni zabavnik ('Sunday Magazine'), 'Musical Notebook' and Tragom ptice Dodo ('On the Trail of the Dodo'), all for TV Sarajevo. 'Fledgling' won a Grand Prix at the Prix Jeunesse International Festival in Munich in 1980.

He spent his last fifteen years teaching English, writing and translating. In 2006, after 40 years of working with children, he joined the Children's Cultural Centre Belgrade, where he wrote and directed programmes, taught English and translated. He has written and published a self-portrait trilogy, "Pigs Do Not Eat Banana Skins", completed a collection of seven short stories under the title "The Golden Candlestick", and completed his official autobiography, "Warts and All".

His name is also associated with a park in the southern suburbs of Belgrade, Banjica Forest, as during the late 1980s he campaigned for it to have special protection because of the large number of nightingales and other species of birds that nest in it. The wood is now an officially protected natural habitat and has its name changed officially to Byford's Forest in 2015.

On 1 April 2010, Byford celebrated the 50th year of his artistic career with the opening of his photograph exhibition, Joy in 100 Pictures, consisting of photographs he took at the 'Joy of Europe' festivals in 2008 and 2009. The same year, he appeared on screen as a cricket umpire in a television advert for Mivela water during the 2010 FIFA World Cup. The ad featured players from the Serbia national cricket team and Serbian footballer Radosav Petrović.

== Pension issue ==
Byford moved to Belgrade, Serbia, former Yugoslavia in 1971 and as a foreigner he was not allowed to participate in the state's pension fund system. Since his wife was from former Yugoslavia (now Serbia), he should inherit the citizenship right after a certain number of years spent in marriage. He received Serbian citizenship only at the age of 65 after intervention of Serbia's then president Boris Tadić. It was too late to become a pension fund participant, since he would be at the age of 80 before he gains the right for a minimal pension.

On 1 January 2011, Serbian newspaper agency Blic wrote an article about Mr. Byford being rejected for a national recognition award for his contribution and previous work (which effectively provides the right to a national pension), despite being nominated by several of his colleagues as described in an interview. Rejecting Mr. Byford's requests for the pension caused significant discontent among people who remember his work from their childhood. Two weeks later after the original article was published, Mr. Byford applied for and received a regular pension, giving him the right to apply for a National Pension. In a later article Byford thanked many supporters who offered their help and started a petition on a Facebook social network. As a result, Mr. Byford received several job offers, but many of them he had to turn down due to his specific health issues. Mr. Byford eventually returned to RTS as a consultant in the Children's Programmes Department. In January 2012 he received national recognition and was awarded a National Pension.

== Death ==
In 2005 Byford was diagnosed with multiple myeloma, a type of cancer formed by malignant plasma cells. He died of the illness on 5 May 2014 in Belgrade. Byford was cremated at the Belgrade's Novo Groblje cemetery on 12 May 2014. He was survived by his former wife Ljudmila "Mila" Stanojević; wife Zorica and three sons : Justin, Jovan, Andrej.
