= University of Belgrade Faculty of Organizational Sciences =

University faculty in Belgrade, Serbia

University of Belgrade, Faculty of Organizational Sciences
- Факултет организационих наука Универзитета у Београду
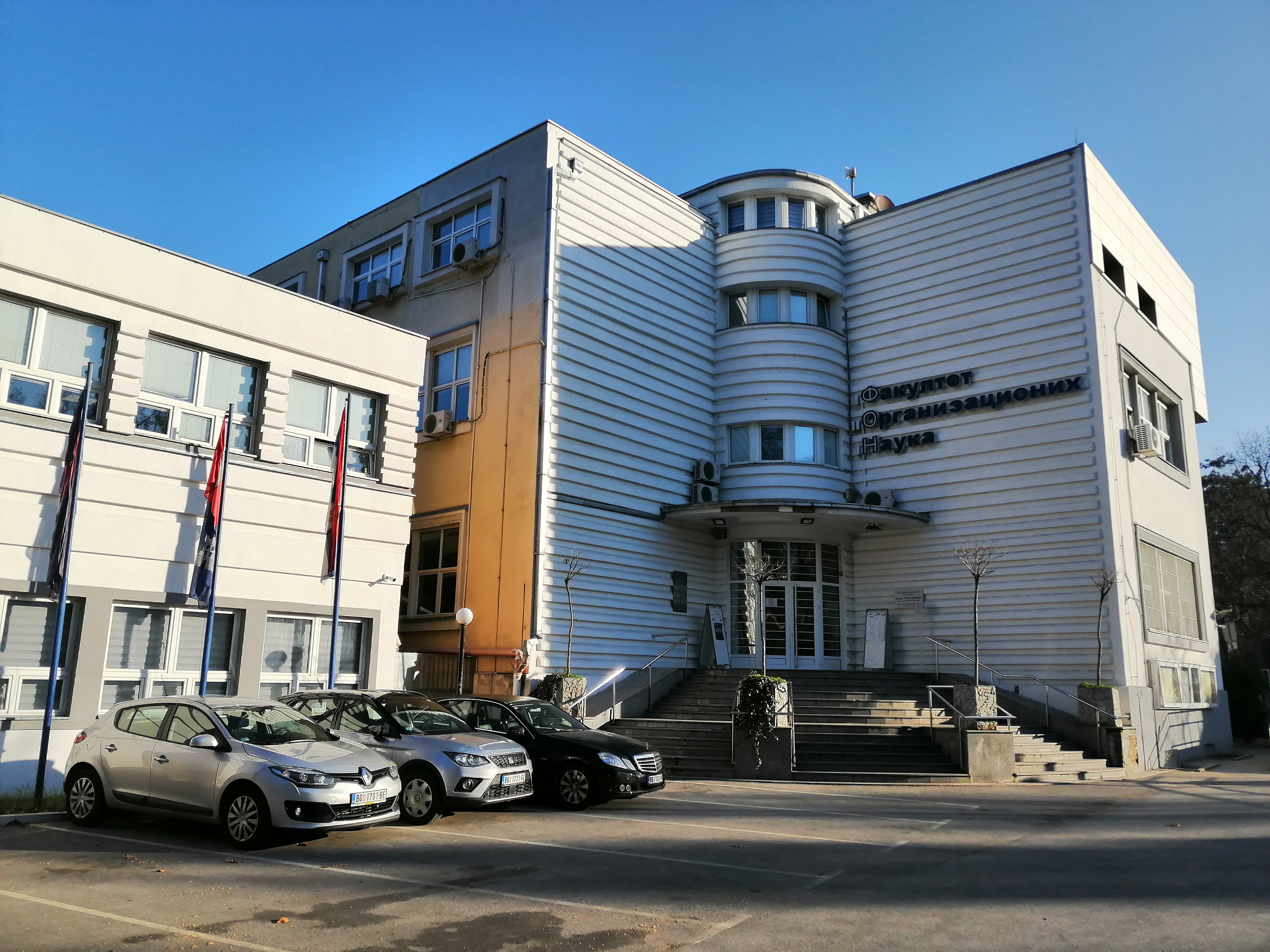
- Faculty of Organizational Sciences Building
- Type: Public
- Established: 6 May 1971; 55 years ago
- Dean: Dr Milan Martić
- Academic staff: 159 (2017)
- Administrative staff: 88 (2017)
- Students: 5,538 (2017)
- Undergraduates: 3,981 (2017)
- Postgraduates: 1,318 (2017)
- Doctoral students: 239 (2017)
- Location: Jove Ilića 54, Belgrade, Serbia; 44.772605°N 20.475169°E
- Campus: Urban
- Language: Serbian, English
- Website: www.fon.bg.ac.rs

The Faculty of Organisational Sciences of the University in Belgrade (Serbian: Факултет организационих наука Универзитета у Београду, romanized: Fakultet organizacionih nauka Univerziteta u Beogradu) is one of the first-tier educational institutions of the University of Belgrade, Serbia.

== History ==
The Faculty of Organizational Sciences was registered on 6 May 1971 and inaugural school year was 1971/72. In January 2018, the Government of Serbia and Faculty signed a contract for the construction of new facility, which would have 7,619 square meters and once completed it would create conditions for enrollment of additional 750 students annually.

== Departments ==
- Department of Information Systems and Technologies
- Department of E-business
- Department of Management and Organization
- Department of Production and Operations Management
- Department of Quality Management
- Department of Mathematics, Statistics and Operations Research
- Department of Social Sciences
